= Rail transport in Mali =

Mali has one 1000mm gauge railroad (the Dakar–Niger Railway), of which 649 km is in Mali. The line runs from the port of Koulikoro via Bamako to the border with Senegal and continues on to Dakar.

The Bamako-Dakar line, which has been described as dilapidated, was owned by a joint company established by Mali and Senegal in 1995, with the eventual goal of privatization.

The Malian portion of the railroad carried an estimated 536,000 tons of freight and 778,000 passengers in 1999. The track is in poor condition, and the line is closed frequently during the rainy season. The line is potentially significant because it links landlocked Mali to the port of Dakar, increasingly of interest for Malian exports in the face of the disruption of access to Abidjan, Côte d'Ivoire, as a result of civil conflict in that country beginning in late 2002.

In 2003, the two countries sold a 25-year concession to run the rail line to a Canadian company, which pledged to upgrade equipment and infrastructure. The concession was terminated in 2016.

International passenger trains ceased in 2010 and freight trains ceased in 2018.

As of 2013, passenger services in Mali were being offered three days per week between Bamako and Kayes via Kati and Diamou. This service ceased in May 2018 due to poor track condition. Five years later, on 9 June 2023, the line was reopened after a renovation that approximately cost $10 million.

The portion of track between Bamako and Koulikoro has been out of service since at least 2005, and satellite imagery shows numerous bridge and roadbed washouts that would need to be repaired before it would be navigable once again.

In the early 2000s, there also were plans to construct a new rail line between Bamako and Kouroussa and Kankan in Guinea.

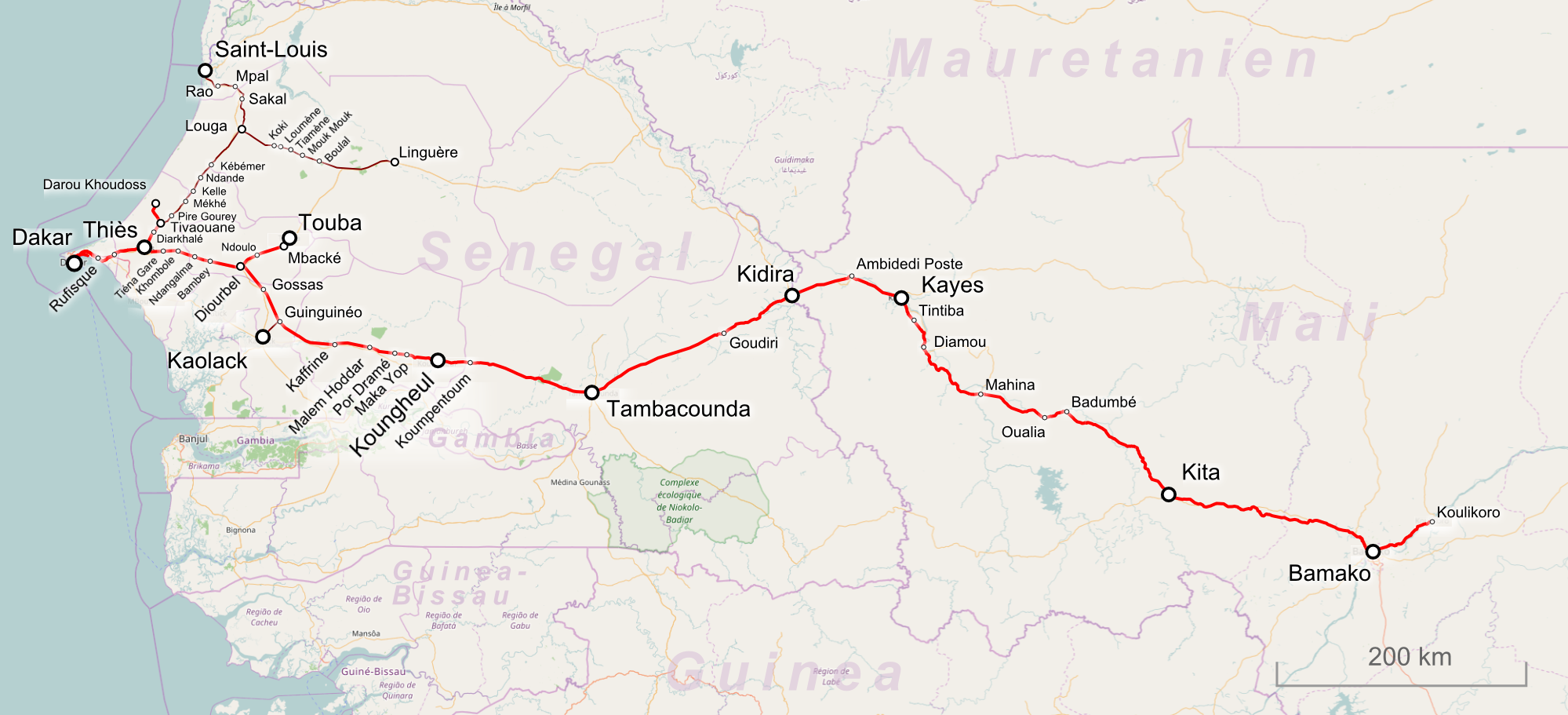
Map of Dakar - Niger railway line

== Sahel Railway ==
In April 2025 a standard gauge (1435mm) railway connecting the landlocked countries of Mali, Burkina Faso and Niger was announced. This railway would be paid for by nationalization of Gold, Uranium and Cotton industries in these three Sahel countries and also remmettancies from national diaspora. A link to the Atlantic Ocean will also be made via extensions of Ghana Railways. As Lomé is the biggest port in west Africa, extension and regauging of the Togo Railway will also need to be implemented.

== Technical ==
=== Narrow gauge ===
- Gauge: 1,000 mm (3 ft 3 3/8 in)
- Brakes: The railway uses vacuum brakes.
- Couplers: Buffers and chain, European. - see loco CC2286.
- Couplers: Norwegian for some vehicles from India.
- Axleload 15 tonnes

=== Standard gauge ===
- Gauge: 1,435 mm (4 ft 8 1/2 in)
- Brakes: Air
- Coupling: AAR
- Axleload:

== Railway links with adjacent countries ==
- Algeria - no - potential break of gauge 1,000 mm (3 ft 3 3/8 in)/1,435 mm (4 ft 8 1/2 in)
- Niger - no railways
- Burkina Faso - proposed gauge 1,435 mm (4 ft 8 1/2 in)
- (Ivory Coast) Côte d'Ivoire - no - same gauge 1,000 mm (3 ft 3 3/8 in)
- Guinea - no - same gauge 1,000 mm (3 ft 3 3/8 in) also 1,435 mm (4 ft 8 1/2 in)
- Senegal - yes - same gauge 1,000 mm (3 ft 3 3/8 in)
- Mauritania - no - break of gauge 1,000 mm (3 ft 3 3/8 in)/1,435 mm (4 ft 8 1/2 in)

== Maps ==
- UN Map

== Cities and Towns served by rail ==
=== Existing ===
- Kidira, Senegal - Mali border
- Kayes, Mali
- Diamou, Mali
- Kita, Mali
- Kati, Mali
- Bamako - national capital

=== Closed ===
- Koulikoro - Former railhead and river port.

== Charts ==
- Length

== See also ==
- Railway stations in Mali
- Transport in Mali
- Rail transport in Senegal
- Dakar–Niger Railway
- West Africa Regional Rail Integration
