= List of railway stations in Ivory Coast =

Railway stations in Côte d'Ivoire include:

== Maps ==
- UN Map
- UNHCR Atlas Map Côte d'Ivoire

== Towns served by rail ==
=== Existing ===
- Abidjan - national capital and port
- Agboville
- Dimbokro - proposed junction
- Bouaké - provincial capital
- Katiola
- Tafiré
- Ferkessédougou - provincial capital, near Burkina Faso border
- (Ivory Coast) Ouangolodougou (Wangolodougou) - near Burkina Faso border.
- Ouangolodougou, Burkina Faso
- Niangoloko, Burkina Faso

=== Proposed ===
- (Ivory Coast) San Pédro - port
- (Ivory Coast) Man
- (Ivory Coast) (Mali) Mount Nimba - iron ore
- Bamako - capital of Mali

- (Ivory Coast) Dimbokro - junction
- (Ivory Coast) Yamoussoukro - national capital

- On 31 November 2011, an agreement was signed to build a new international railway connecting Côte d'Ivoire, Burkina Faso, Niger and Benin. This project was superseded in 2025 by the 1435mm gauge Sahel Railway.
- In 2011, there was a proposal to convert the line to standard gauge.

- 2015 - Abidjan Metro

==== 2014 ====
Minister of economic infrastructure proposes a $160 million railway from Ouangolo in northern Ivory Coast to Sikasso in southern Mali.

- (Mali) Bamako (0 km)
- (Mali) Bougouni
- (Mali) Sikasso
- border
- (Ivory Coast) Ouangolodougou (569 km)

==== 2015 ====
News

==== 2018 ====
News

== See also ==
- Transport in Côte d'Ivoire
- Railway stations in Burkina Faso
- Railway stations in Mali - possible connection with West Africa Regional Rail Integration
- Template:Suburban railways in Africa
