= Railway stations in Mali =

Railway stations in Mali include:

== Maps ==
- UN Map
- UN
- UNHCR Map

== Cities and Towns served by rail ==
=== Existing ===
- Dakar, Senegal - port
- Tambacounda, Senegal (24m)
- Goudiry (57m)
- Kidira, Senegal (35m) - Mali border.
- Kayes, Mali (20m)
- Bafoulabe (83m) - station is at Mahina
- Diamou, Mali (72m)
- Kita Mali (392m)
- Kati, Mali (439m)
- (Mali) Bamako (249) - river; national capital - workshops
- Korofina (331m) - suburb
- Koulikoro (330m) - railhead and river port.

=== Proposed ===
(proposed West Africa Regional Rail Integration - connection to either Burkina Faso or Côte d'Ivoire)

- Bamako - national capital - major bridge over Niger River - proposed junction
- USTDA grant in 2009.

- (Mali) (Ivory Coast) border with Côte d'Ivoire.
- (Mali) Kolondieba (316m)
- (Ivory Coast) Ouangolodougou, Côte d'Ivoire (303m) - junction
- (Burkina Faso) Niangoloko (303m)

- Sikasso (419m)
- (Mali) border with Burkina Faso
- (Burkina Faso) Orodaro (543m)
- (Burkina Faso) Banfora (303m) - junction

- (Mali) Koury (354m)
- (Burkina Faso) Kayan
- (Burkina Faso) Bobo-Dioulasso (445m) - junction

- (Mali) Segou (270m)
- (Mali) Koutiala (323m)

- Mali
- (Mali) (Guinea) border
- (Guinea) Kankan
- Conakry, port, Guinea 2014

- Bale, Mali iron ore deposits

=== Standard Gauge ===
- 2001 Report
- 2010 Report
- 2017 Report

== See also ==
- Transport in Mali
- Railway stations in Senegal
- AfricaRail
