= Railway stations in Niger =

Railway map of Benin including the never built rail link to Niger

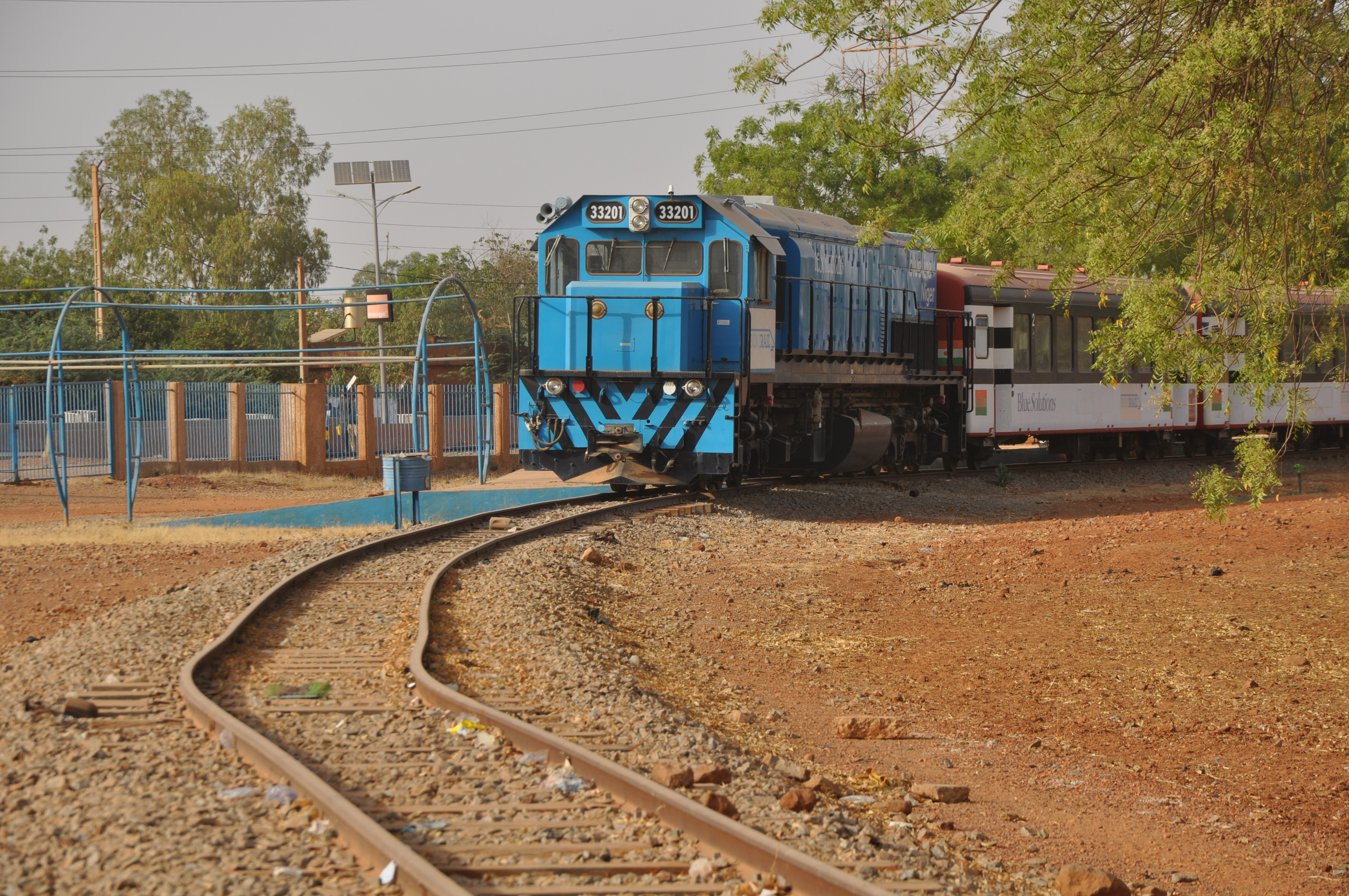
Niamey, terminus station

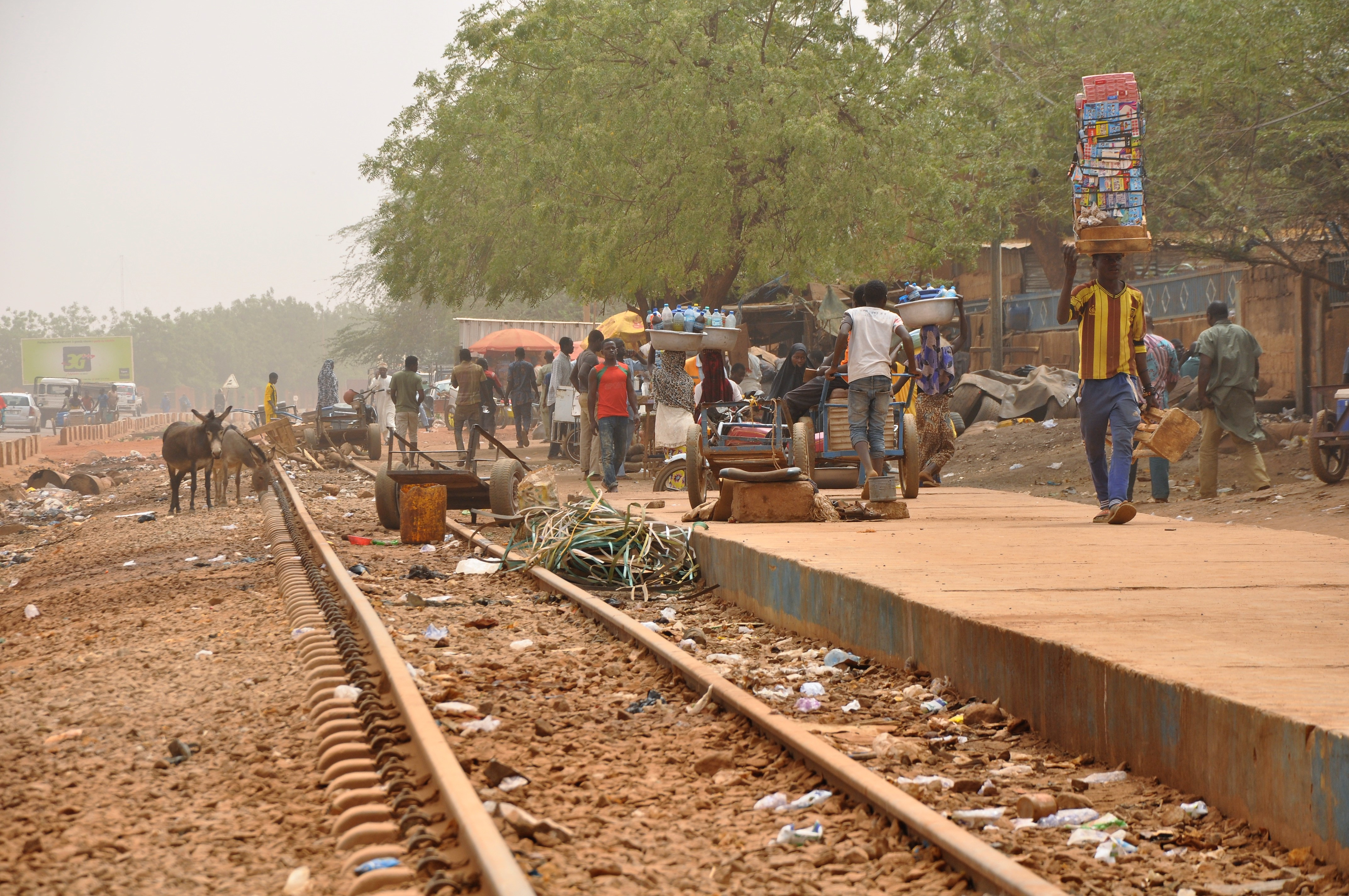
Niamey, airport station

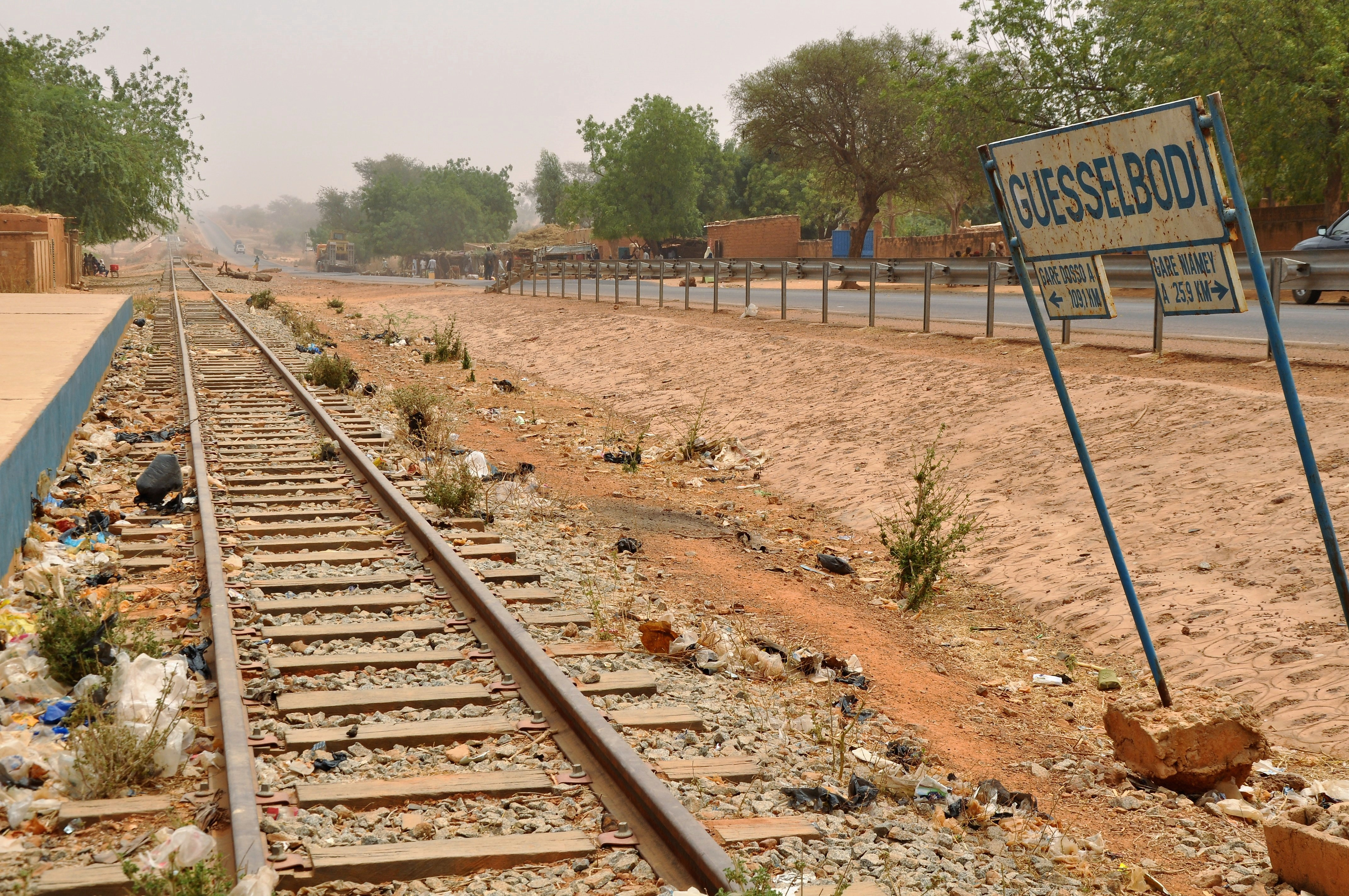
Guesselbodi station

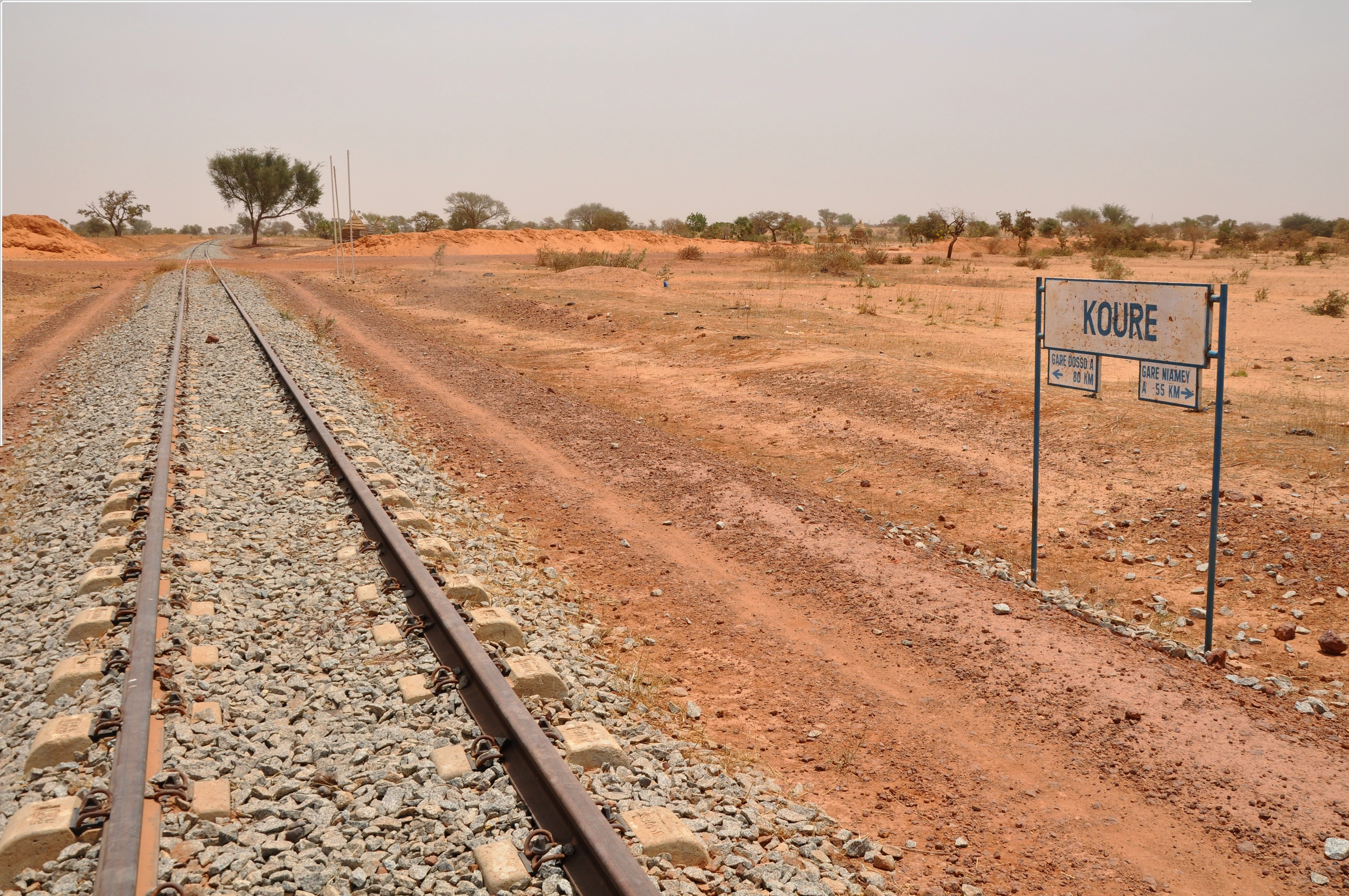
Kouré station

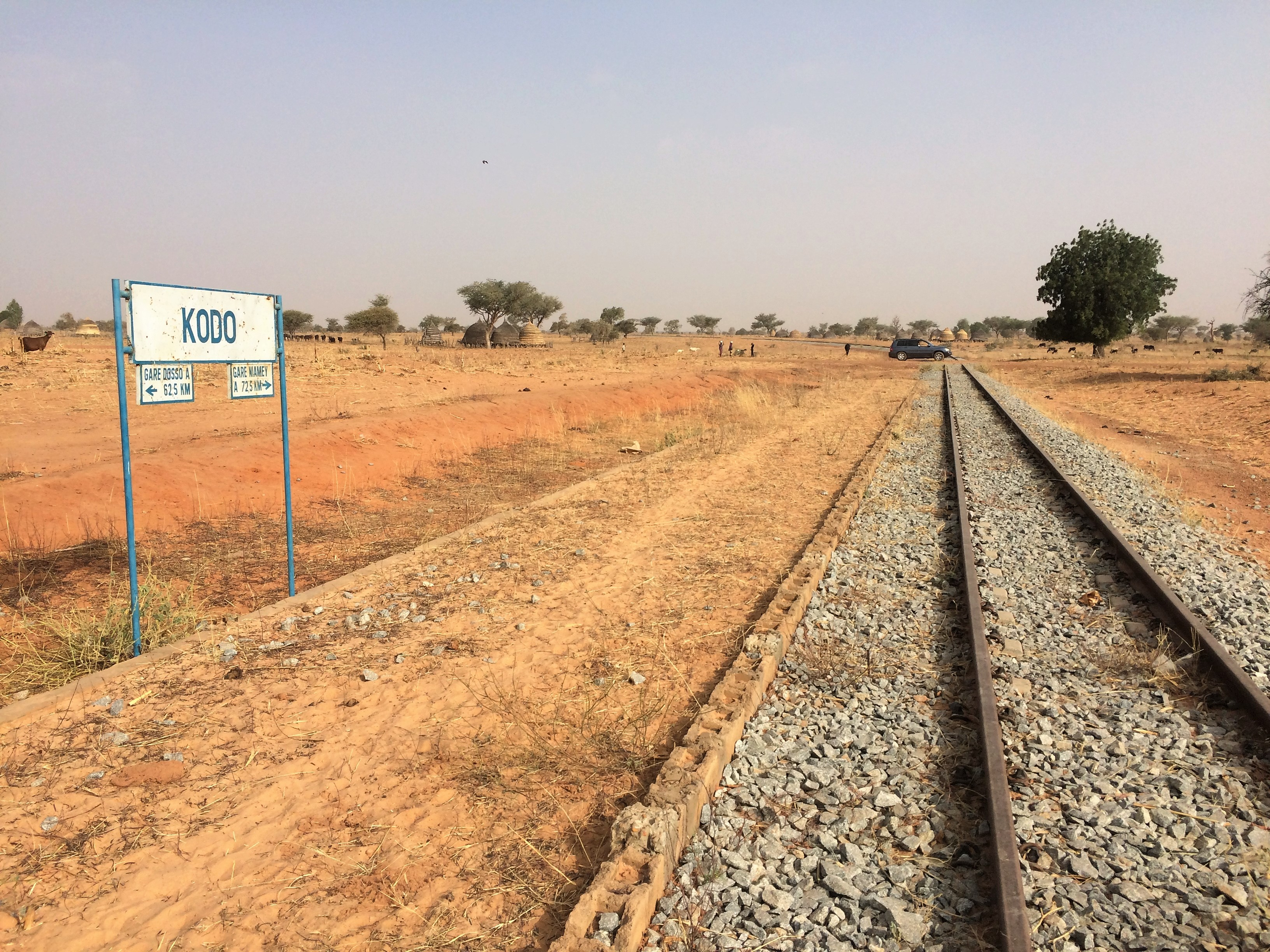
Kodo station

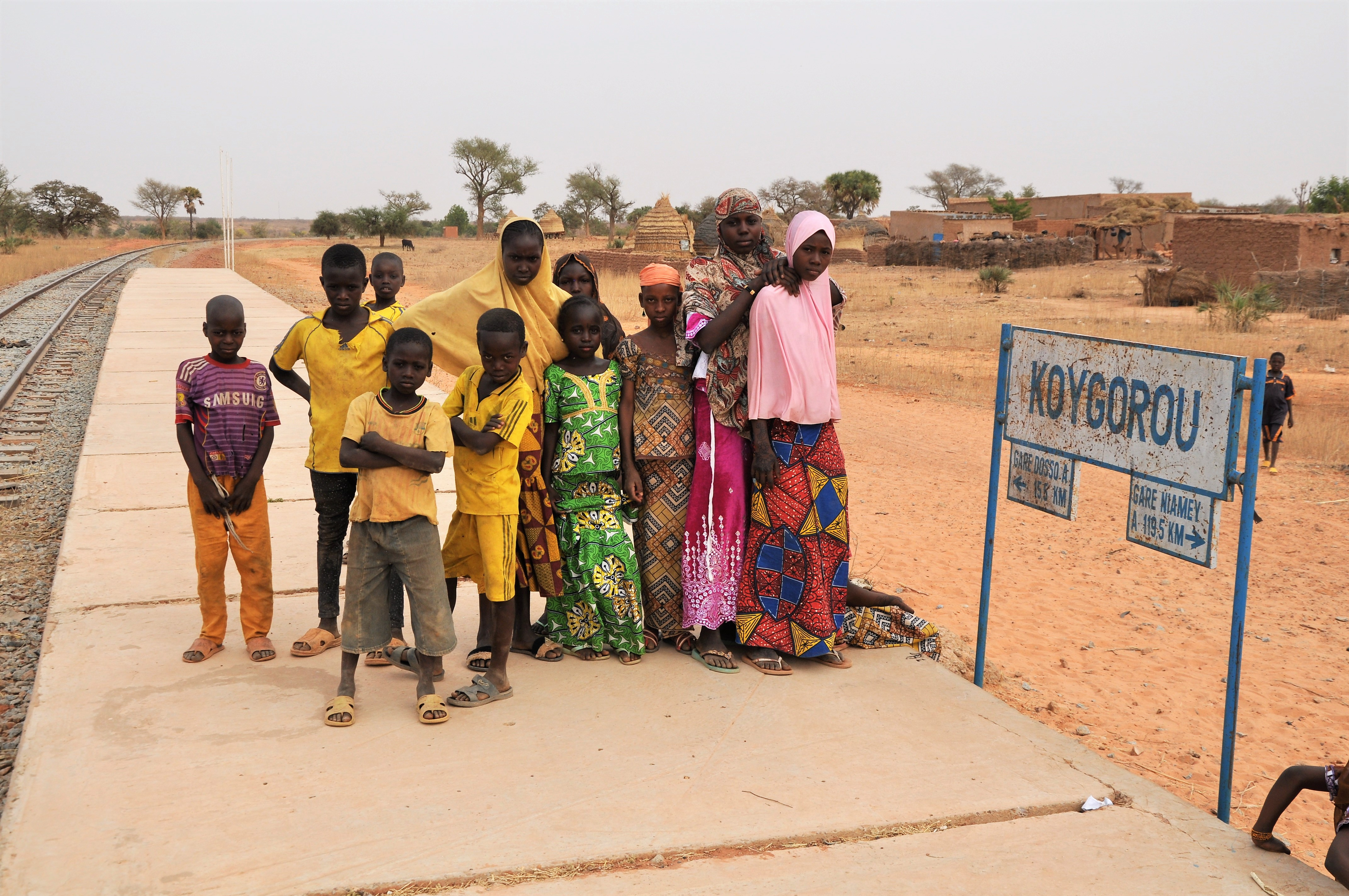
Koygorou station

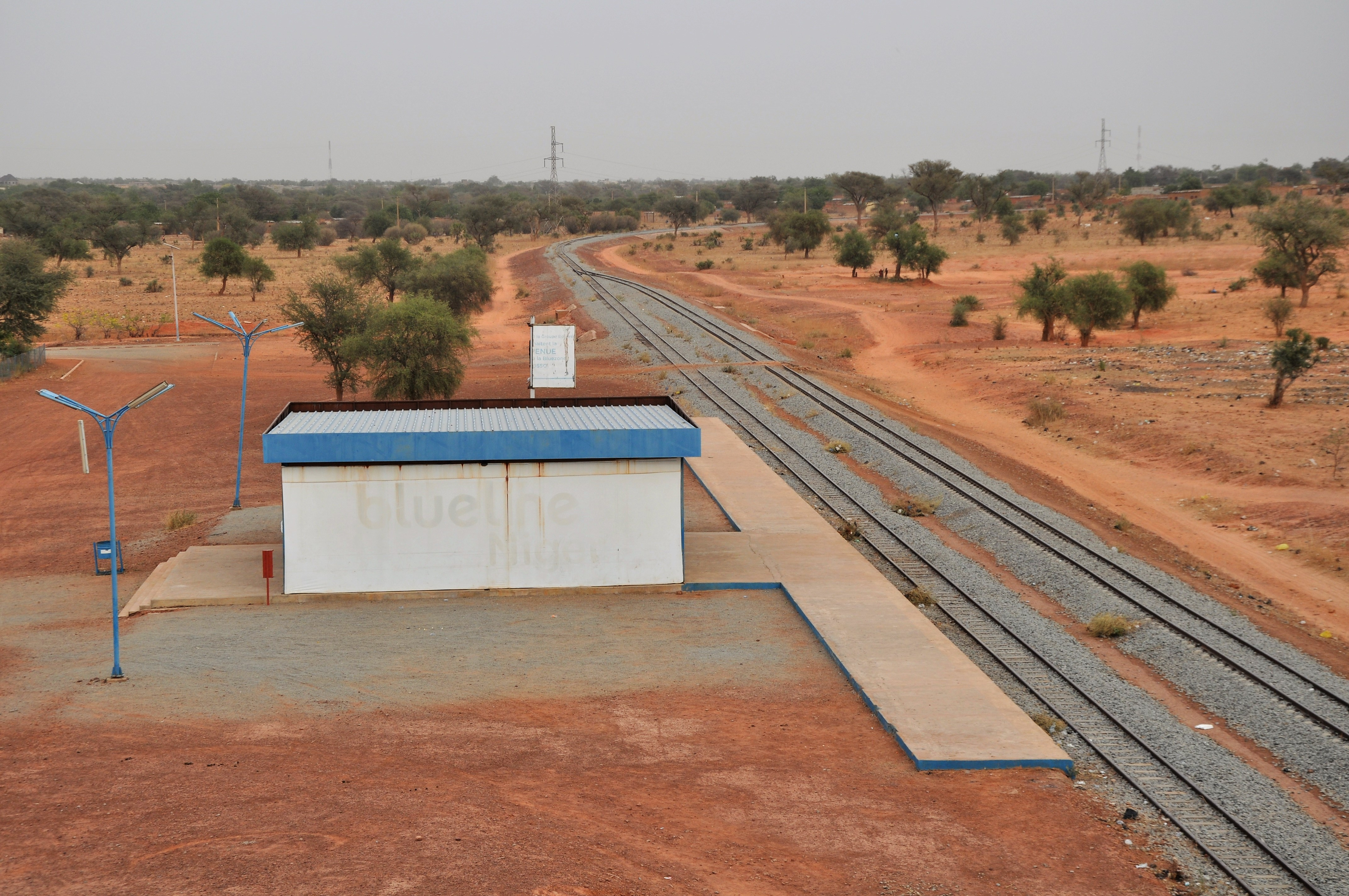
Dosso station

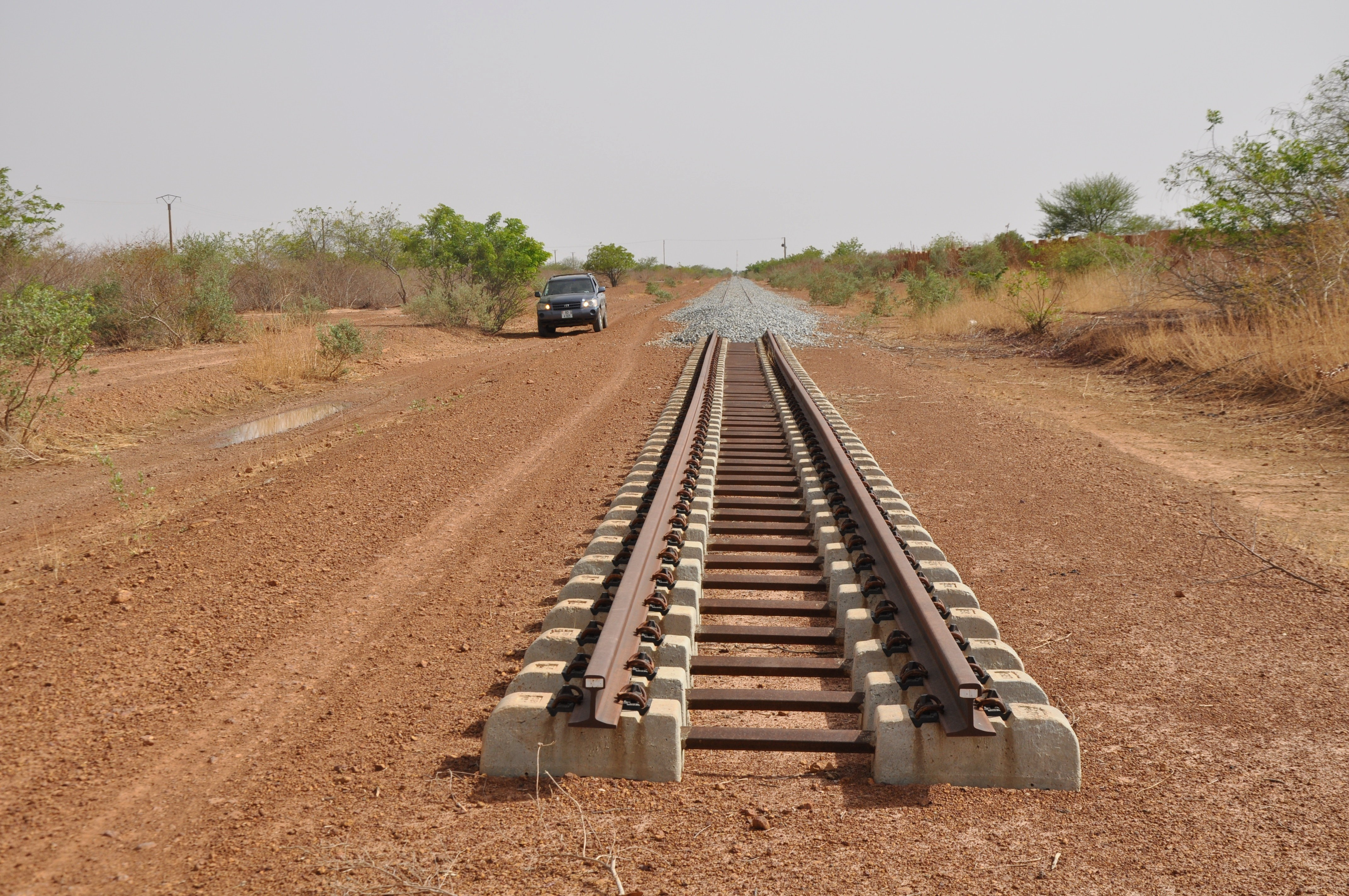
End of the tracks, 6 km south of Dosso

There is currently one railway in Niger, built between 2014 and 2016 between Niamey and Dosso by the French Bolloré conglomerate. The objective was to connect Niamey to the rail network in Benin and thus to the coast. But competing commercial interests by several parties resulted in endless litigation and the connection to Benin never materialized, resulting in the 145 km Niamey-Dosso stretch lying orphaned and unused, with the tracks ending in the middle of nowhere some 6 km south of Dosso. After several years of neglect, the tracks are damaged to such an extent in some places that they have become unusable. At the Niamey Terminus Station, the rails are kinked to such an extent by the summer heat that the train would not be able to leave the station (see image).

A rail connection from Maradi into Nigeria is being considered.

== Maps ==
- UN Map

== Built, but not operational ==
- Niamey terminus station (Niamey, capital of Niger). The station, officially inaugurated on 7 April 2014, is the first one opened in the country.
- (Niger) Niamey, airport station.
- (Niger) Guesselbodi station.
- (Niger) Kouré station.
- (Niger) Kodo station.
- (Niger) Birni N'Gaouré station.
- (Niger) Koygorou station.
- (Niger) Dosso station.

== Built and operational ==
=== in Benin ===
- (1,000 mm (3 ft 3 3/8 in) gauge)
- Cotonou (0 km) - port in Benin
- (Benin) Parakou (438 km) - railhead in north

== Proposed ==
=== From Parakou (Benin), to Dosso (Niger) ===
- (Benin) Ndali
- (Benin) Kandi
- (Benin) Guéné
- (Benin) Lama-Kara
- (Benin) Malanville
- (Benin) border (574 km) near Niger River bridge.
- (Niger) Gaya

=== From Nigeria ===
- (1,435 mm (4 ft 8 1/2 in) gauge
- (Nigeria) Kano - junction (0 km) (capital Kano State)
- (Nigeria) Dutse
- (Nigeria) Kazaure
- (Nigeria) Daura
- (Nigeria) Katsina (state capital Katsina State)
- (Nigeria) Jibia
- (Nigeria) (Niger) border
- Maradi, Niger (capital Maradi Department (248 km)
- (Niger) Niamey - national capital.
- .
- (existing narrow 1067mm gauge)
- (Nigeria) Zaria - junction (0 km)
- (Nigeria) Gusau - (capital Zamfara State)
- (Nigeria) Kauran Namoda railhead

=== From Côte d'Ivoire via Burkina Faso ===
- (Ivory Coast) Abidjan
- (Ivory Coast) (Burkina Faso) (border)
- Burkina Faso
- (Burkina Faso) (Niger) (border)
- (Niger) Niamey

== See also ==
- Railway stations in Benin
- Railway stations in Nigeria
- Railway stations in Burkina Faso
- Railway stations in Côte d'Ivoire
- AfricaRail
- West Africa Regional Rail Integration
