= West Africa Regional Rail Integration =

Proposal to link railway networks in West Africa

The West Africa Regional Rail Integration is a proposal to connect up isolated railway networks in West Africa.

== Overview ==
In 2009, USTDA approved funding of $750,000 for a feasibility study grant to assist the Union économique et monétaire ouest-africaine (UEMOA), in determining the technical and economic viability of developing a rail line from Bamako, Mali to Mali's southeastern border with Ivory Coast, as well as its associated costs, design and construction criteria, and implementation plan. The study will also include a technical assessment on the existing rail line between Dakar, Senegal and Bamako, which would be linked to the proposed rail line. The total cost of the proposed line is expected to exceed $1.9 billion.

The 15-month railway study USTDA contract was authorised to begin in October 2010. ZETA-TECH Associates of Cherry Hill NJ (NOW Harsco Rail Intelligent Solutions) undertook the study with other companies assisting, including the Law Offices of Peter C. Hansen, LLC, which analysed the existing legal framework and drafted a treaty to modernise the ownership structure and facilitate long-term financing of the revitalised railway. A final report was delivered in December 2012, and a French translated copy was accepted by UEMOA in March 2013.

== Timeline ==
=== 2011 ===
- On 31 November 2011, an agreement was signed to build a new international railway connecting Ivory Coast, Burkino Faso, Niger and Benin.

No progress was reported on that announcement as of the summer of 2012.

In October 2012 UEMOA held a meeting to at its Burkina Faso headquarters to review and discuss a draft report on the USTDA funded rail project. The consulting team presented four different capital cost modernisation plans. One would be for just minimum safety changes. The most ambitious plan would support a possible 10 million ton modernised standard gauge conversion rail project, with the earliest train operations occurring sometime around 2017 between Dakar and Bamako. The requirements would include an integrated plan of execution with mine + rail + port + a new Railway 2-nation Authority, if the project consultant suggestions are followed. Building just the railway without integrating these other transport and customer commercial actions was recommended as a critical process for moving towards a final total plan.

The Bamako to the south railway corridor has a separate set of competitive issues and technical costs associated with it.

The consultant team also projected the possible Pro Forma Income Statement for three of the possible railway operating company levels of modernisation. Contact UEMOA or the consultants for further information as to the capital costs, possible operating scenarios, and economic outcomes.

A complete Critical Path for debating and then making project decisions (given the many technical choices) and then executing project funding and bidding and construction was also submitted to UEMOA by the consultant team. As of mid October 2012 that process was just starting at a technical review level under the guidance of UEMOA staff.

A PowerPoint presentation that summarised the technical results and possible financial or Pro Forma operating income of the upgraded Dakar to Bamako railway was presented to The Corporate Council of Africa in Washington in mid-February 2013. Among the items discussed was the calculated cost of 1) a modern meter gauge railway service as requested by a UEMOA rail task force "solution" and 2) the cost of a conversion to a standard gauge between Dakar and Bamako. The project capital costs together with the estimated cost of rail operation plus the cost of repaying the capital infrastructure debt were identified in a Pro Forma Income Statement for the improved railway enterprise (a designed railway company) at a given future year 2017 tonnage. The project design was built around an attempt to resolve for the lowest possible bulk cargo rates to reach a new proposed bulk cargo port south of Dakar. The target rate was <$32 a metric ton at standard gauge and somewhat higher at meter gauge. This pro forma analysis shows evidence that the railway can be independently financed by investors without the need of a Senegal or a Mali mine company actual railway "ownership" (a burden to the mine company Balance Sheet). A railway authority is recommended as a means of attracting private capital using the bonding and commercial structure of such a government of Senegal and Mali chartered body rather than a conventional concession approach. The railway feasibility was based on a variety of engineering and economic possible designs that used different rail mode market shares and different levels of railway operating efficiency (operating ratios) and different track structure safety standards. Naturally, the local African leaders will have to make the final design choices. From an economic point of view, subsidies and doners are not necessary if the traffic market share and the engineering and train operational designs are correctly matched. USTDA financed The next step is for the large shippers to meet collectively or individually with UEMOA and test the feasibility study against their specific (and often private) shipper requirements. Either the authors or UEMOA should be contacted. In the meantime, rail service is continuing in the corridor under the existing concession arrangement.

During February 2013 the report was translated into French. Contact UEMOA or Harsco Rail Zeta Tech or USTDA for further information.

Harsco Rail Zeta Tech; Jim Blaze Project Director

=== 2014 ===
- Study

=== 2015 ===
- Construction starts on extension of railway in Benin to Niger. Both are 1,000 mm (3 ft 3 3/8 in) gauge. The existing railway in Benin will be upgraded.

=== 2017 ===
- Proposal for standard gauge rail line stretching from Parakou, Benin to Ilorin, Nigeria

=== 2018 ===
- About 120 km of the new missing link has been completed, from Niamey towards the Benin border.
- Niger-Ivory Coast Metre gauge.

=== 2019 ===
- A start is made laying dual gauge sleepers in Ghana capable of conversion to standard gauge in future.

=== 2025 ===
- In April 2025 a standard gauge (1435mm) railway connecting the landlocked countries of Mali, Burkina Faso and Niger was announced. This railway would be paid for by nationalisation of Gold, Uranium and Cotton industries in these three Sahel countries and also remittancies from national diaspora.
- In 2025 a 1435mm gauge railway between Nigeria and Maradi in Niger is underway; it is not clear if it will extend to Niamey the capital of Niger.

== Maps ==
=== Nigeria ===
- UN Map
- UNHCR Atlas Map
- Railway stations in Nigeria

=== Benin ===
- UN Map
- CIA Map of Benin
- UNHCR Map of Benin
- UNHCR Atlas Map
- Railway stations in Benin (*)

=== Togo ===
- UN Map GH - covers 95% of Togo
- UNECA Map
- UNHCR Map - includes yet to be built railways
- UNHCR Atlas Map
- Railway stations in Togo (*)

=== Ghana ===
- UN Map Ghana
- UNHCR Atlas Map Ghana
- GhanaNet Map
- UNHCR Atlas Map
- Railway stations in Ghana (*)

=== Niger ===
- UN Map
- UNHCR Map NIG
- Map
- Railway stations in Niger (*)

=== Burkina Faso ===
- UN Map (no longer shows railway lines).
- UNHCR Map
- UNHCR Atlas Map
- Railway stations in Burkina Faso (*)

=== Ivory Coast ===
- UN Map
- UNHCR Atlas Map Ivory Coast
- Railway stations in Ivory Coast (*)

=== Liberia ===
- UN Map
- Railway stations in Liberia (*)

=== Sierra Leone ===
- UN Map of Sierra Leone - no railways shown at all.
- UNHCR Atlas map
- Railway stations in Sierra Leone (*)

=== Guinea ===
- UN Map
- UNHCR Atlas Map (2005)
- UNHCR Atlas Map (2004)
- Railway stations in Guinea (*)

=== Mali ===
- UN Map
- UNHCR Map
- Railway stations in Mali (*)

=== Senegal ===
- UN Map
- Go
- Railway stations in Senegal (*)

== See also ==
- ECOWAS rail
- AfricaRail is an earlier and similar scheme.
- Dakar-Niger Railway
- Rail transport in Ivory Coast
- Transport in Burkina Faso
- Rail transport in Mali
- Rail transport in Senegal
- Railway stations in Mali
