= Rail transport in Burkina Faso =

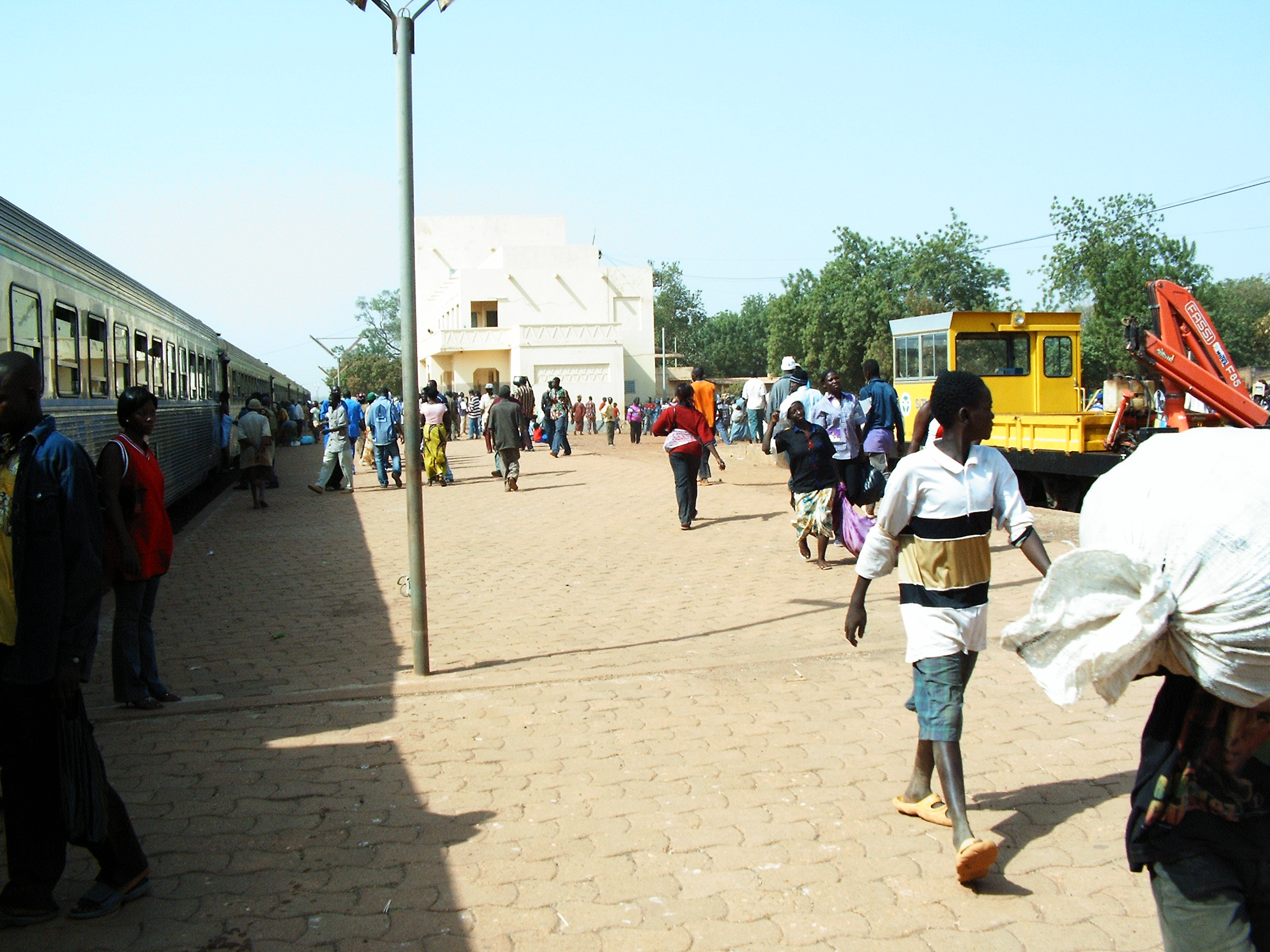
Train station in Koudougou, Burkina Faso.

There are 622 kilometres of 1,000 mm (3 ft 3 3/8 in) metre gauge railway in Burkina Faso, which run from Kaya to the border with Côte d'Ivoire and is part of the Abidjan-Ouagadougou railway. As of June 2024, 'Sitarail' does not operate a passenger train to Abidjan.

Burkina Faso is landlocked, but the railway to Abidjan provides rail access to a port. Links to railways in Ghana and the port of Takoradi have been repeatedly proposed.

== Stations ==
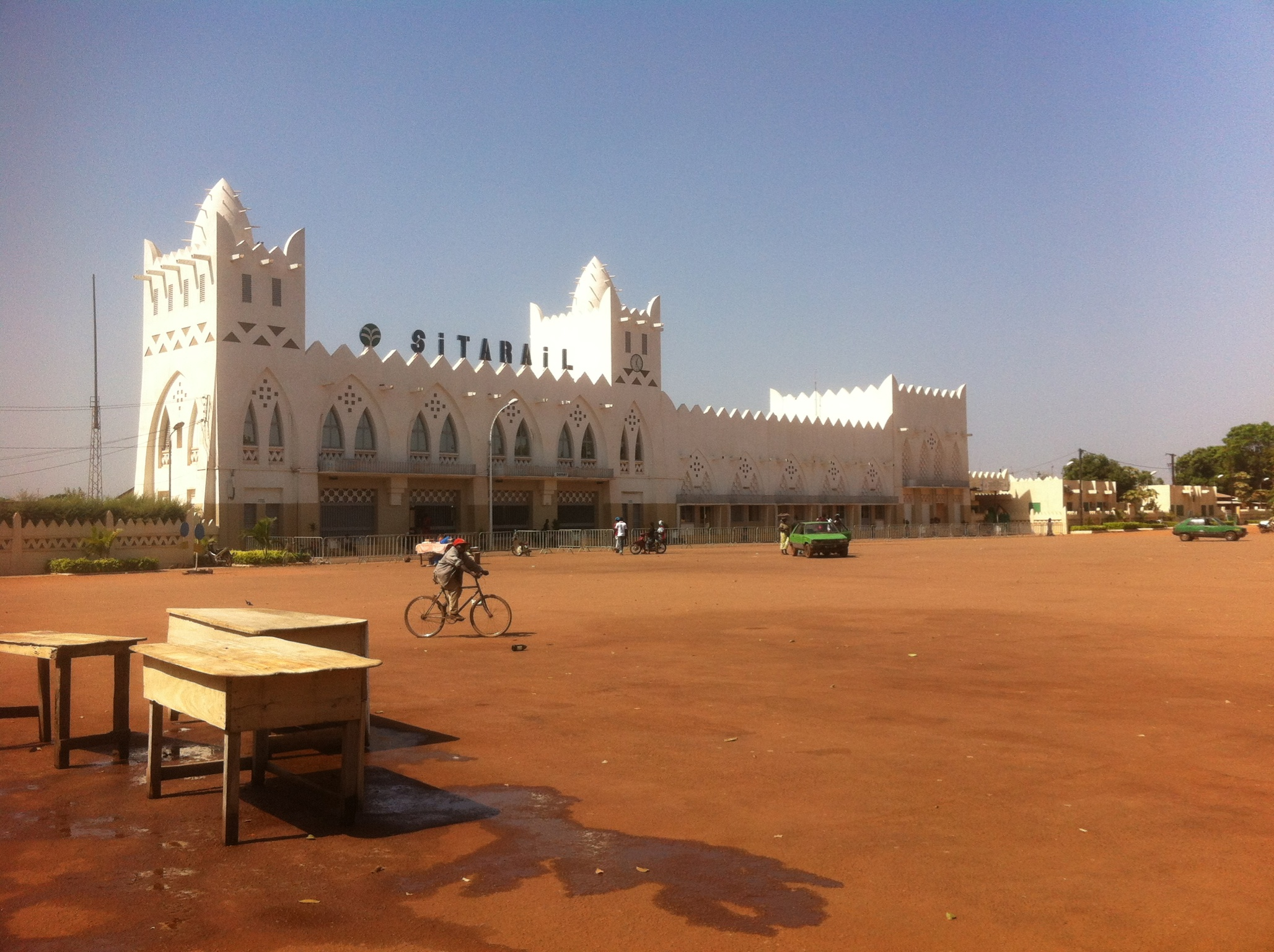
Bobo-Dioulasso station

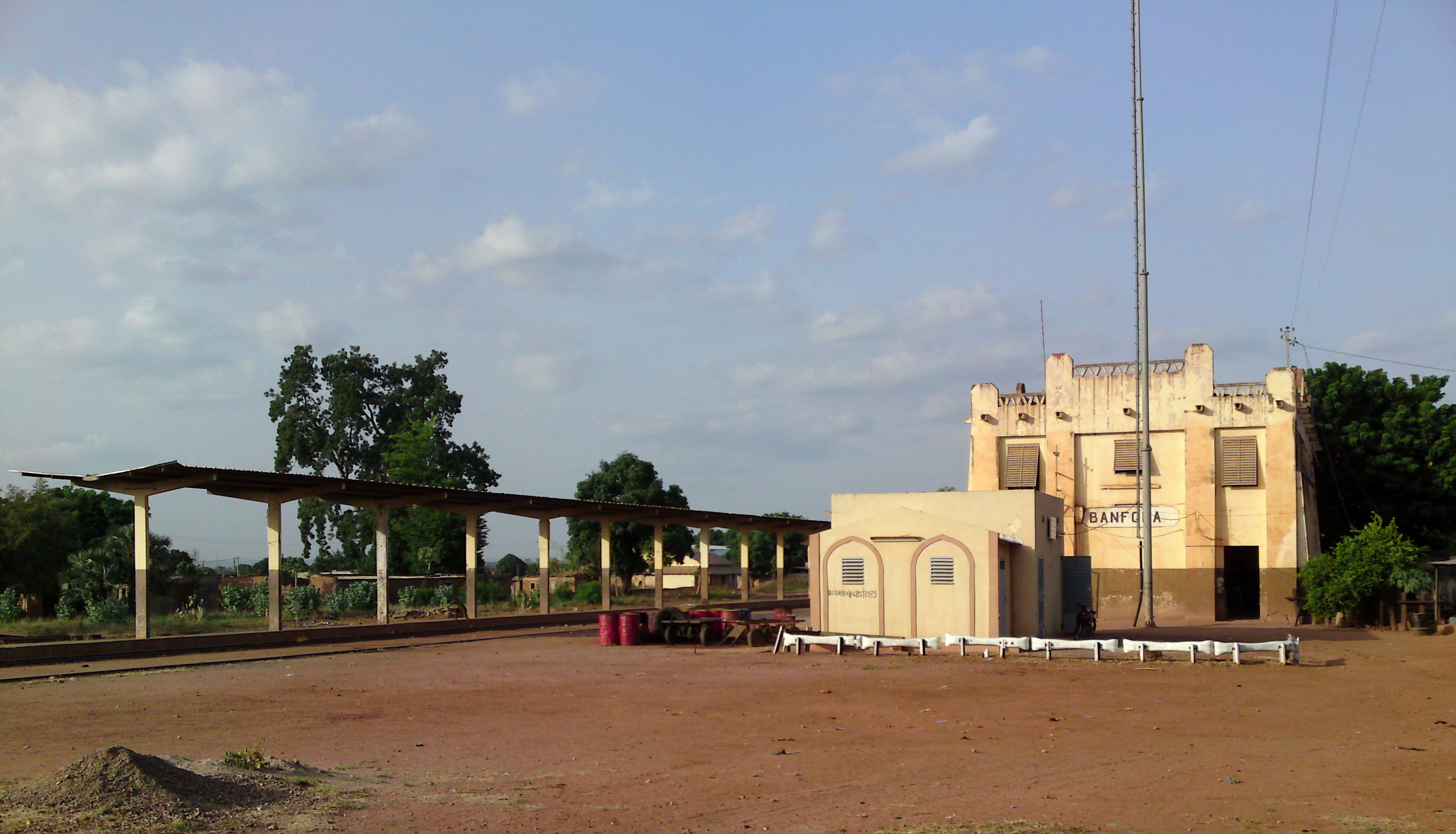
Banfora station

The following towns of Burkina Faso are served by the country's railways:

- (Ivory Coast) - (Burkina Faso) - border
- (Burkina Faso) Niangoloko
- Banfora
- Peni
- Bobo-Dioulasso
- Sala
- Koudougou
- Bingo
- Ouagadougou (national capital)
- Ziniaré (service suspended)
- Kaya terminus

=== Construction resuming ===
- (for 3MTpa manganese - 2014)?
- Kaya (terminus)
- Dori (approx. 100 km of the extension from Kaya to Dori; visible on Google Earth dated 15/2/07)
- Markoye
- Tambao (manganese), near Niger/Mali borders

=== Proposed ===
- (1,435 mm (4 ft 8 1/2 in) standard gauge gauge)
- Tamale, Ghana
- (Ghana) Navrongo
- (Ghana) Bolgatanga
- (Ghana) Paga
- Border (Ghana-Burkina Faso)
- (Burkina Faso) Dakola
- (Burkina Faso) Pô
- (Burkina Faso) Bagré
- (Burkina Faso) Zabre
- (Burkina Faso) Tenkodogo
- (Burkina Faso) Manga
- (Burkina Faso) Ouagadougou - national capital - junction with Sahel Railway

== See also ==
- Railway stations in Burkina Faso
- Railway stations in Ghana

== Proposed ==
=== 2011 ===
On 31 November 2011, an agreement was signed to build a new international railway connecting Ivory Coast, Burkina Faso, Niger, and Benin. See AfricaRail.

=== 2014 ===
Pan African Minerals to develop the Tambao manganese project at a cost of up to $1 billion. The manganese mine is in the north of Burkina Faso, near the border with Niger and Mali, containing perhaps 100 million tonnes of the metal (used in steel production). "The Tamboa project is an integrated project with a mining component and an infrastructure component, notably through the roads, railway and the port", said Romanian billionaire Frank Timis. "The project will happen in the next three years and will require investment of nearly $1 billion".

=== 2018 ===
Ghana and Ivory Coast sign a deal to develop a through rail link.

Ghana and Burkina Faso sign deal for link Link

== Maps ==
- UN Map-
- UNHCR Map -

== Gallery ==
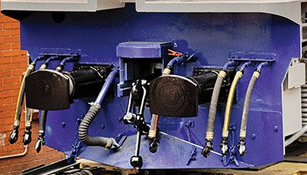
Buffer-and-screw coupler 1,000 mm (3 ft 3 3/8 in) metre gauge gauge in Ivory Coast and Burkina Faso.

== See also ==
- Rail transport in Ghana; Ghana Railway Corporation
- Railway stations in Niger
- Railway stations in Ivory Coast
- Transport in Burkina Faso
- West Africa Regional Rail Integration
