= ECOWAS rail =

One of the goals of the Economic Community of West African States (ECOWAS) is the development of an integrated railroad network.

Aims include the extension of railways in member countries, the interconnection of previously isolated railways and the standardisation of gauge, brakes, couplings, and other parameters.

== Proposed lines ==
The first line would connect the cities and ports of Lagos, Cotonou, Lomé and Accra and would allow the largest container ships to focus on a smaller number of large ports, while efficiently serving a larger hinterland. This line connects 3 ft 6 in (1,067 mm) gauge and 1,000 mm (3 ft 3 3/8 in) metre gauge systems, which would require four rail dual gauge, which can also provide standard gauge.

== Gauge (railway) ==
Table A
System	Gauge	Remarks
Benin Transport	1,000 mm (3 ft 3 3/8 in)	
Ivory Coast Transport	1,000 mm (3 ft 3 3/8 in)	
Burkina Faso Transport	1,000 mm (3 ft 3 3/8 in)	
Gambia (nil)		
Ghana Transport	1,067 mm (3 ft 6 in)	conversion to 1,435 mm (4 ft 8 1/2 in) starts 2019.
Guinea-Bissau (nil)		
Liberia Transport	1,435 mm (4 ft 8 1/2 in); 1,067 mm (3 ft 6 in)	
Niger Transport	1,000 mm (3 ft 3 3/8 in)	
Nigeria Transport	1,067 mm (3 ft 6 in); 1,435 mm (4 ft 8 1/2 in)	conversion to SG starts 2018.
Senegal Transport	1,000 mm (3 ft 3 3/8 in)	
Mali Transport	1,000 mm (3 ft 3 3/8 in)	
Sierra Leone Transport	1,067 mm (3 ft 6 in)	
Togo Transport	1,000 mm (3 ft 3 3/8 in)	(suspended)
Guinea Transport	1,000 mm (3 ft 3 3/8 in); 1,435 mm (4 ft 8 1/2 in)	

== See also ==
- AfricaRail
