= Yendere =

- Location in Burkina Faso
- Coordinates: 10°12′27″N 4°58′34″W
- Country: Burkina Faso
- Region: Cascades Region
- Province: Comoé Province
- Department: Niangoloko Department

Population (2019)
  - Total: 5,190

Yendere is a town in the Niangoloko Department of Comoé Province in south-western Burkina Faso.

Population
Year	Pop.	±%
1985	1,004	—
2006	3,372	+235.9%
2019	5,190	+53.9%
