= Mitieridougou =

- Location in Burkina Faso
- Coordinates: 10°15′14″N 4°52′58″W
- Country: Burkina Faso
- Region: Cascades Region
- Province: Comoé Province
- Department: Niangoloko Department

Population (2019)
  - Total: 2,886

Mitieridougou is a town in the Niangoloko Department of Comoé Province in south-western Burkina Faso.

Population
Year	Pop.	±%
1985	1,322	—
2006	2,676	+102.4%
2019	2,886	+7.8%
