= Nofesso =

Nofesso Nonfesso
- Location in Burkina Faso
- Coordinates: 10°08′19″N 4°47′03″W
- Country: Burkina Faso
- Region: Cascades Region
- Province: Comoé Province
- Department: Niangoloko Department

Population (2019)
  - Total: 1,172

Nofesso is a town in the Niangoloko Department of Comoé Province in south-western Burkina Faso.

Population
Year	Pop.	±%
1985	514	—
2006	1,970	+283.3%
2019	1,172	−40.5%
