= Kimini =

- Location in Burkina Faso
- Coordinates: 10°06′22″N 4°46′51″W
- Country: Burkina Faso
- Region: Cascades Region
- Province: Comoé Province
- Department: Niangoloko Department

Population (2019)
  - Total: 4,140

Kimini is a town in the Niangoloko Department of Comoé Province in south-western Burkina Faso.

Population
Year	Pop.	±%
1985	773	—
2006	3,186	+312.2%
2019	4,140	+29.9%
