= Toundoura =

- Location in Burkina Faso
- Coordinates: 10°11′51″N 4°46′19″W
- Country: Burkina Faso
- Region: Cascades Region
- Province: Comoé Province
- Department: Niangoloko Department

Population (2019)
  - Total: 1,328

Toundoura is a town in the Niangoloko Department of Comoé Province in south-western Burkina Faso.

Population
Year	Pop.	±%
1985	546	—
2006	1,340	+145.4%
2019	1,328	−0.9%
