= Boko, Burkina Faso =

Coordinates: 10°11′02″N 4°42′47″W

Boko Bokouo
- Interactive map of Boko
- Country: Burkina Faso
- Region: Cascades Region
- Province: Comoé Province
- Department: Niangoloko Department

Population (2019)
  - Total: 2,371

Boko is a town in the Niangoloko Department of Comoé Province in south-western Burkina Faso.

== See also ==
- Boko District

Population
Year	Pop.	±%
1985	326	—
2006	2,114	+548.5%
2019	2,371	+12.2%
