= Karaborosso =

Karaborosso Koraborosso
- Interactive map of Karaborosso
- Coordinates: 10°11′57″N 5°00′38″W
- Country: Burkina Faso
- Region: Cascades Region
- Province: Comoé Province
- Department: Niangoloko Department

Population (2019)
  - Total: 859

Karaborosso is a town in the Niangoloko Department of Comoé Province in south-western Burkina Faso.

Population
Year	Pop.	±%
1985	782	—
2006	917	+17.3%
2019	859	−6.3%
