= Niangoloko Department =

Niangoloko
- Department
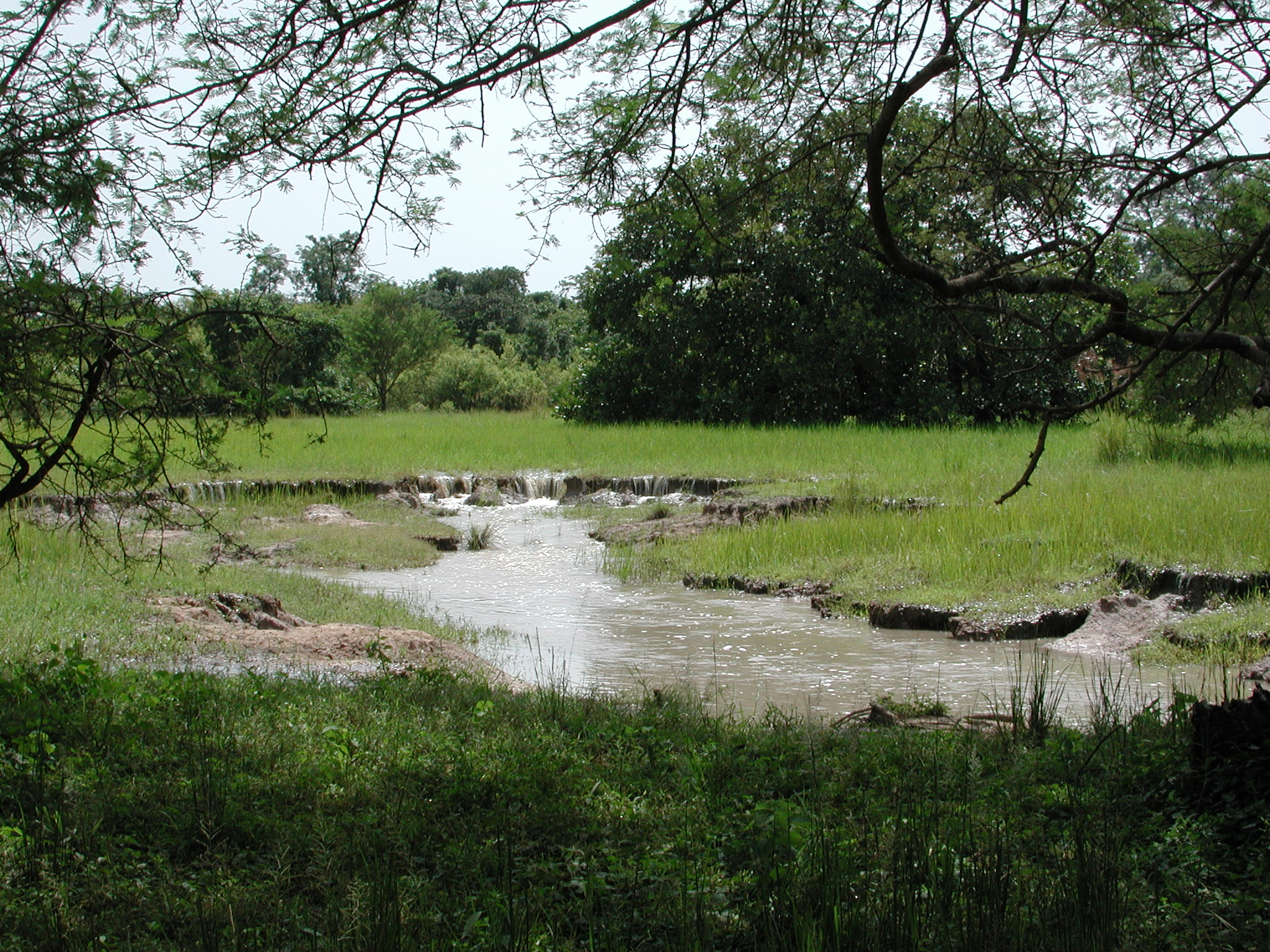
- Niangoloko Forest
- Legend: Capital; Villages
- Country: Burkina Faso
- Province: Comoé Province

Area
  - Department: 1,080 sq mi (2,790 km^{2})

Population (2019 census)
  - Department: 76,840
  - Density: 71.3/sq mi (27.5/km^{2})
  - Urban: 33,292
- Time zone: UTC+0 (GMT 0)

Niangoloko is a department or commune of Comoé Province in southern Burkina Faso. Its capital is the town of Niangoloko. According to the 2019 census the department has a total population of 76,840.

== Towns and villages ==
Place	Population (2019)	Location
Niangoloko	33929	10°17′00″N 04°55′00″W
Boko	2371	10°11′02″N 4°42′47″W
Dangouindougou	2989	10°11′42″N 5°01′11″W
Diefoula	3116	10°15′05″N 4°42′18″W
Folonzo	1858	9°57′30″N 4°40′43″W
Kakoumana	394	10°14′24″N 4°56′27″W
Karaborosso	859	10°11′57″N 5°00′38″W
Kimini	4140	10°06′22″N 4°46′51″W
Koutoura	4173	10°21′23″N 4°49′45″W
Mitieridougou	2886	10°15′14″N 4°52′58″W
Nofesso	1172	10°08′19″N 4°47′03″W
Ouangolodougou	7990	10°04′08″N 4°48′19″W
Tierkora	2441	10°05′42″N 4°53′24″W
Timperba	2656	10°09′53″N 4°54′06″W
Toundoura	1328	10°11′51″N 4°46′19″W
Yendere	5190	10°12′27″N 4°58′34″W
