= Tierkora =

- Interactive map of Tierkora
- Coordinates: 10°05′42″N 4°53′24″W
- Country: Burkina Faso
- Region: Cascades Region
- Province: Comoé Province
- Department: Niangoloko Department

Population (2019)
  - Total: 2,441

Tierkora is a town in the Niangoloko Department of Comoé Province in south-western Burkina Faso.

Population
Year	Pop.	±%
1985	164	—
2006	749	+356.7%
2019	2,441	+225.9%
