= Diefoula =

- Location in Burkina Faso
- Coordinates: 10°15′05″N 4°42′18″W
- Country: Burkina Faso
- Region: Cascades Region
- Province: Comoé Province
- Department: Niangoloko Department

Population (2019)
  - Total: 3,116

Diefoula is a town in the Niangoloko Department of Comoé Province in south-western Burkina Faso.

Population
| Year | Pop. | ±% |
|---|---|---|
| 1985 | 377 | — |
| 2006 | 1,911 | +406.9% |
| 2019 | 3,116 | +63.1% |
