= Timperba =

Timperba Tiemberba, Tinpereba
- Interactive map of Timperba
- Coordinates: 10°09′53″N 4°54′06″W
- Country: Burkina Faso
- Region: Cascades Region
- Province: Comoé Province
- Department: Niangoloko Department

Population (2019)
  - Total: 2,656

Timperba is a town in the Niangoloko Department of Comoé Province in south-western Burkina Faso.

Population
Year	Pop.	±%
1985	1,238	—
2006	3,181	+156.9%
2019	2,656	−16.5%
