= Folonzo =

Folonzo Folazo
- Location in Burkina Faso
- Coordinates: 9°57′30″N 4°40′43″W
- Country: Burkina Faso
- Region: Cascades Region
- Province: Comoé Province
- Department: Niangoloko Department

Population (2019)
  - Total: 1,858

Folonzo is a town in the Niangoloko Department of Comoé Province in south-western Burkina Faso.

Annual rainfall in the area is approximately 1100mm. Dry season is from January to June.

Studies of Glossina tachinoides, a species of tsetse fly, have been conducted on the Komoé River at Folonzo.

A non profit organization, L’association Idéal de Folonzo conducts literacy classes with local children.

== Gallery ==
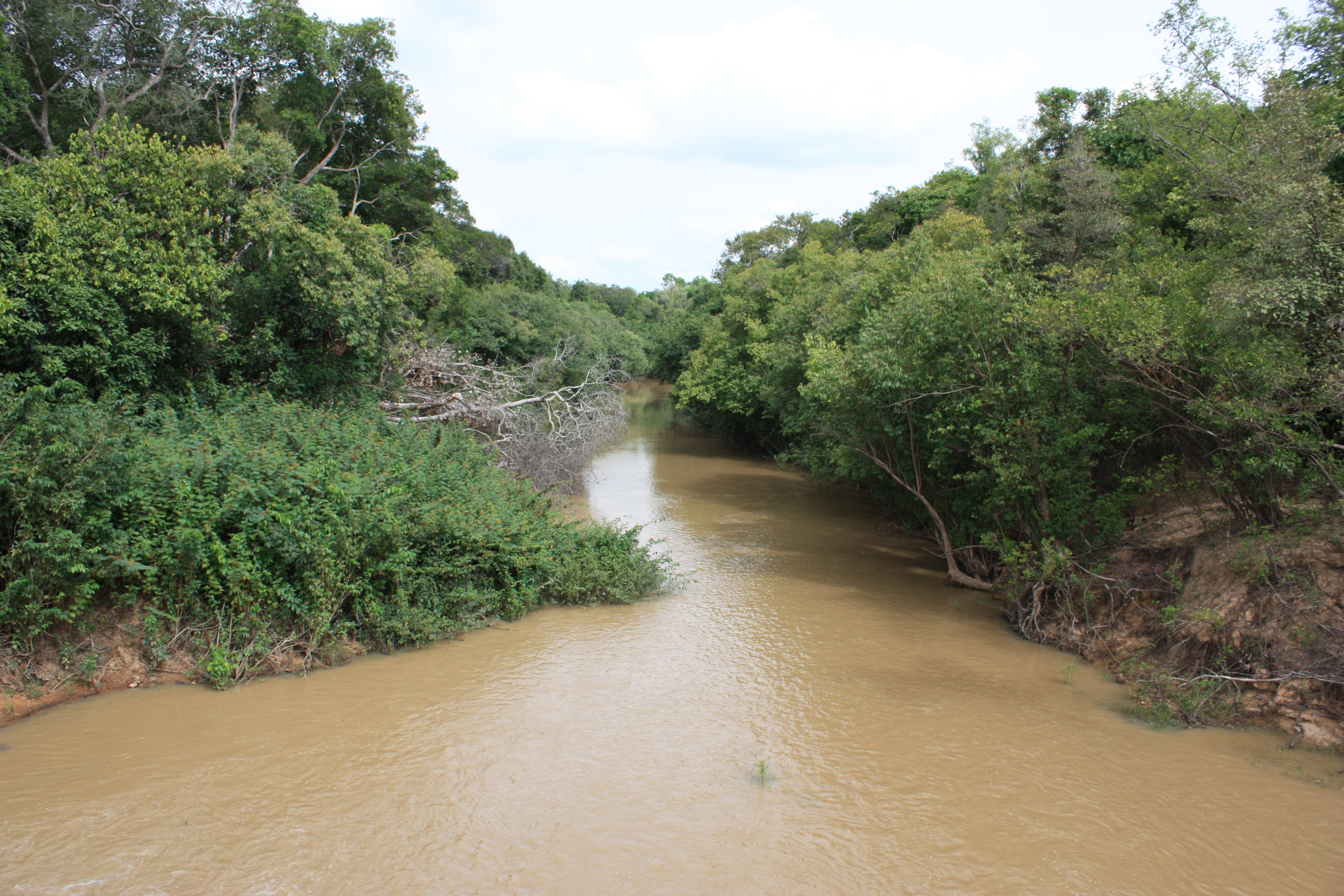
Komoé River near Folonzo

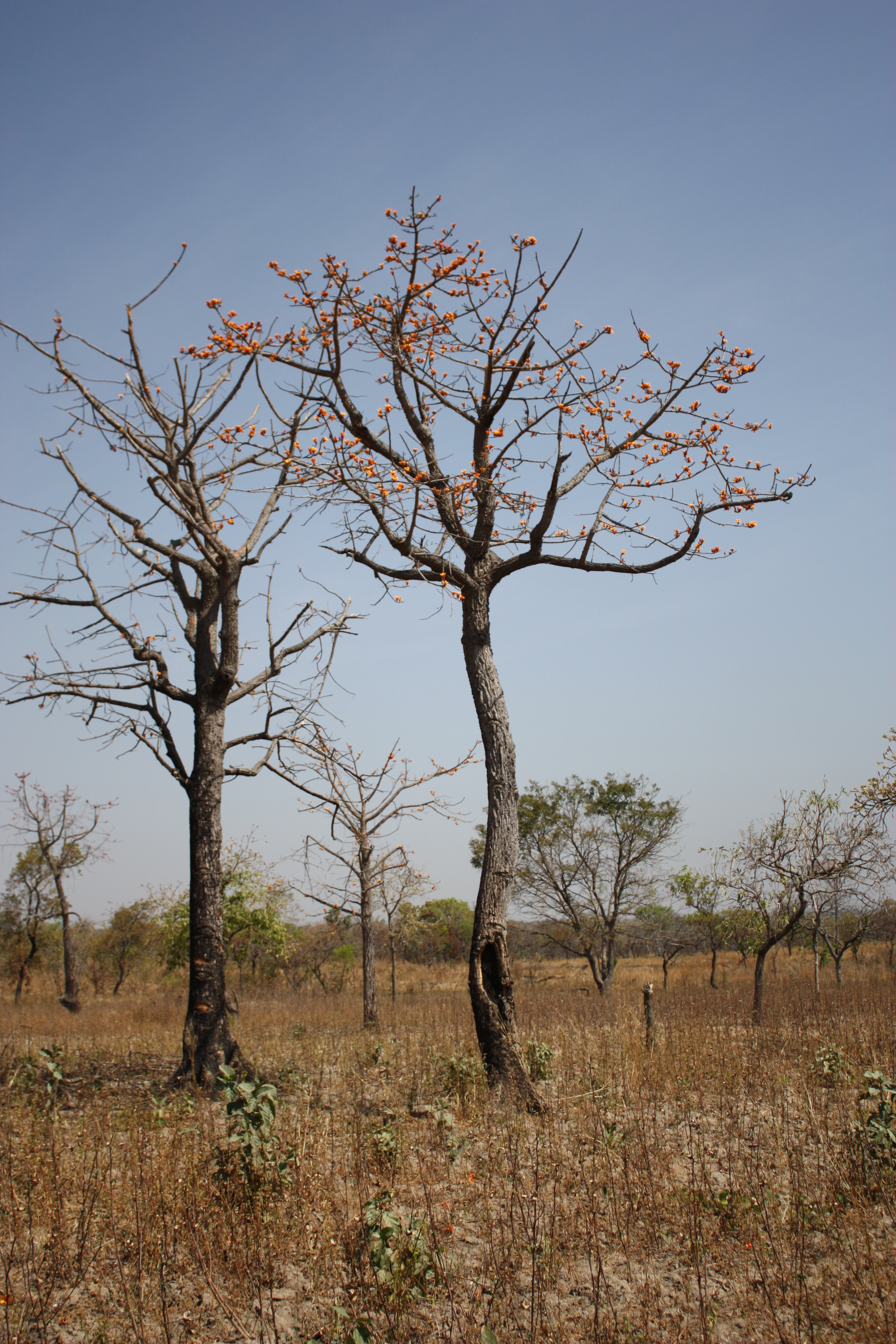
Bombax costatum near Folonzo

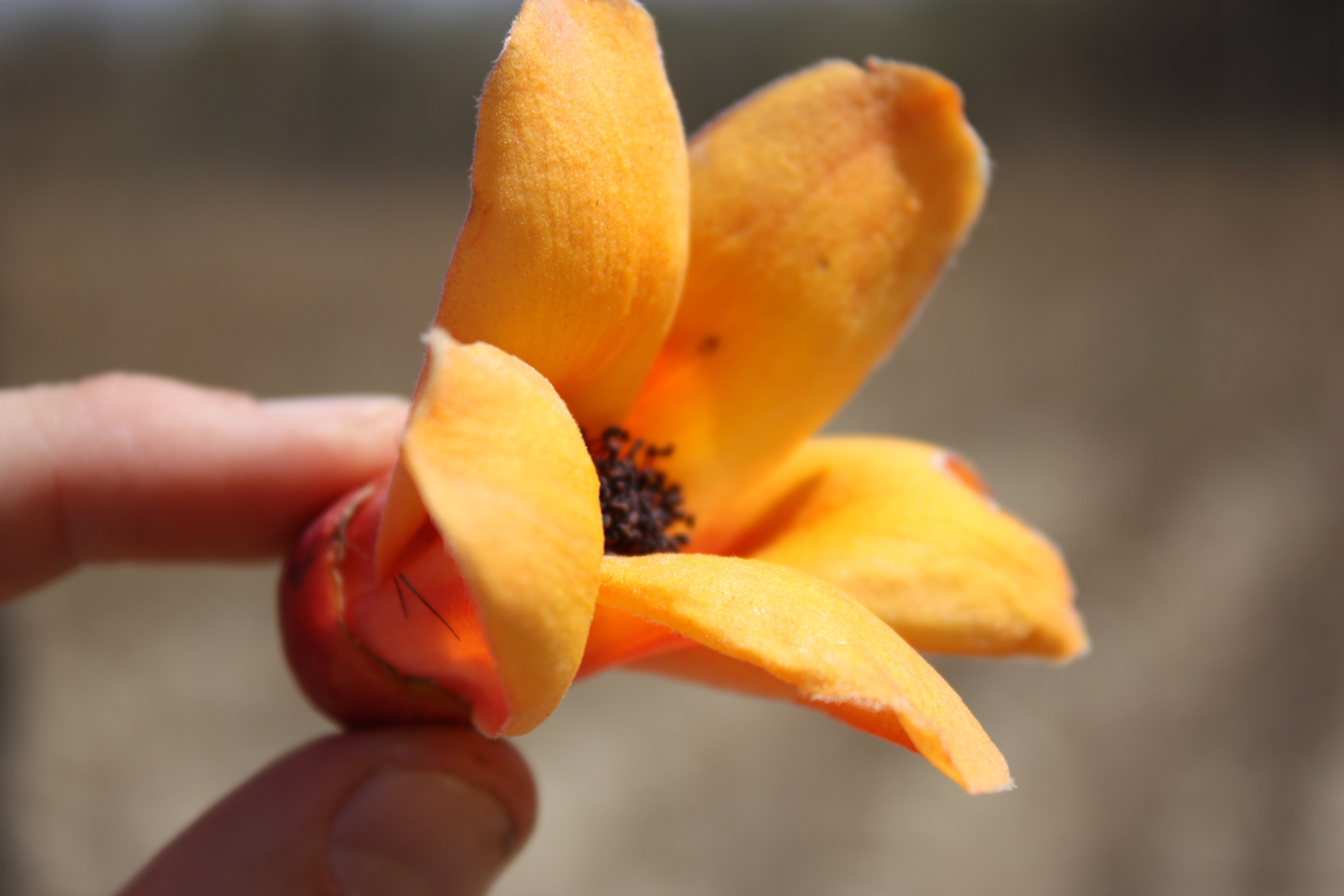
Bombax costatum flower near Folonzo

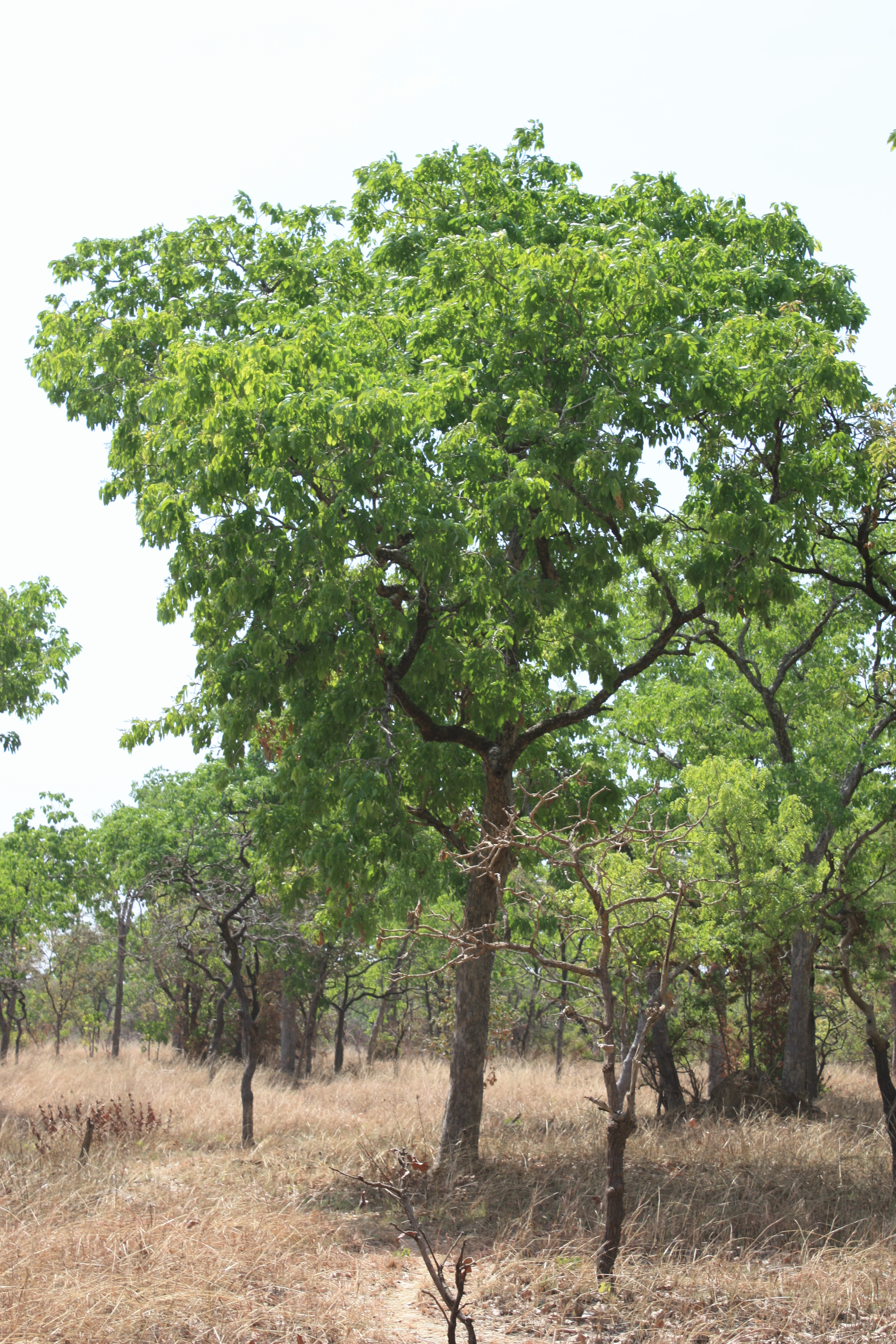
Isoberlinia doka near Folonzo

Population
Year	Pop.	±%
1985	443	—
2006	1,997	+350.8%
2019	1,858	−7.0%
