= Kakoumana =

- Location in Burkina Faso
- Coordinates: 10°14′24″N 4°56′27″W
- Country: Burkina Faso
- Region: Cascades Region
- Province: Comoé Province
- Department: Niangoloko Department

Population (2019)
  - Total: 394

Kakoumana is a town in the Niangoloko Department of Comoé Province in south-western Burkina Faso.

Population
| Year | Pop. | ±% |
|---|---|---|
| 1985 | 186 | — |
| 2006 | 179 | −3.8% |
| 2019 | 394 | +120.1% |
