= Dangouindougou =

Dangouindougou Dangouandougou
- Location in Burkina Faso
- Coordinates: 10°11′42″N 5°01′11″W
- Country: Burkina Faso
- Region: Cascades Region
- Province: Comoé Province
- Department: Niangoloko Department

Population (2019)
  - Total: 2,989

Dangouindougou is a town in the Niangoloko Department of Comoé Province in south-western Burkina Faso.

Population
Year	Pop.	±%
1985	777	—
2006	1,956	+151.7%
2019	2,989	+52.8%
