= Koutoura =

- Location in Burkina Faso
- Coordinates: 10°21′23″N 4°49′45″W
- Country: Burkina Faso
- Region: Cascades Region
- Province: Comoé Province
- Department: Niangoloko Department

Population (2019)
  - Total: 4,173

Koutoura is a town in the Niangoloko Department of Comoé Province in south-western Burkina Faso.

Population
Year	Pop.	±%
1985	2,107	—
2006	3,017	+43.2%
2019	4,173	+38.3%
