= Ouangolodougou, Burkina Faso =

Ouangolodougou Wangolédougou
- Location in Burkina Faso
- Coordinates: 10°04′08″N 4°48′19″W
- Country: Burkina Faso
- Region: Cascades Region
- Province: Comoé Province
- Department: Niangoloko Department

Population (2019)
  - Total: 7,990

Ouangolodougou is a town in the Niangoloko Department of Comoé Province in south-western Burkina Faso, adjacent to the border with Ivory Coast.

The town was visited by Louis-Gustave Binger in February 1888.

Population
Year	Pop.	±%
1985	1,120	—
2006	3,263	+191.3%
2019	7,990	+144.9%
