= Transport in Burkina Faso =

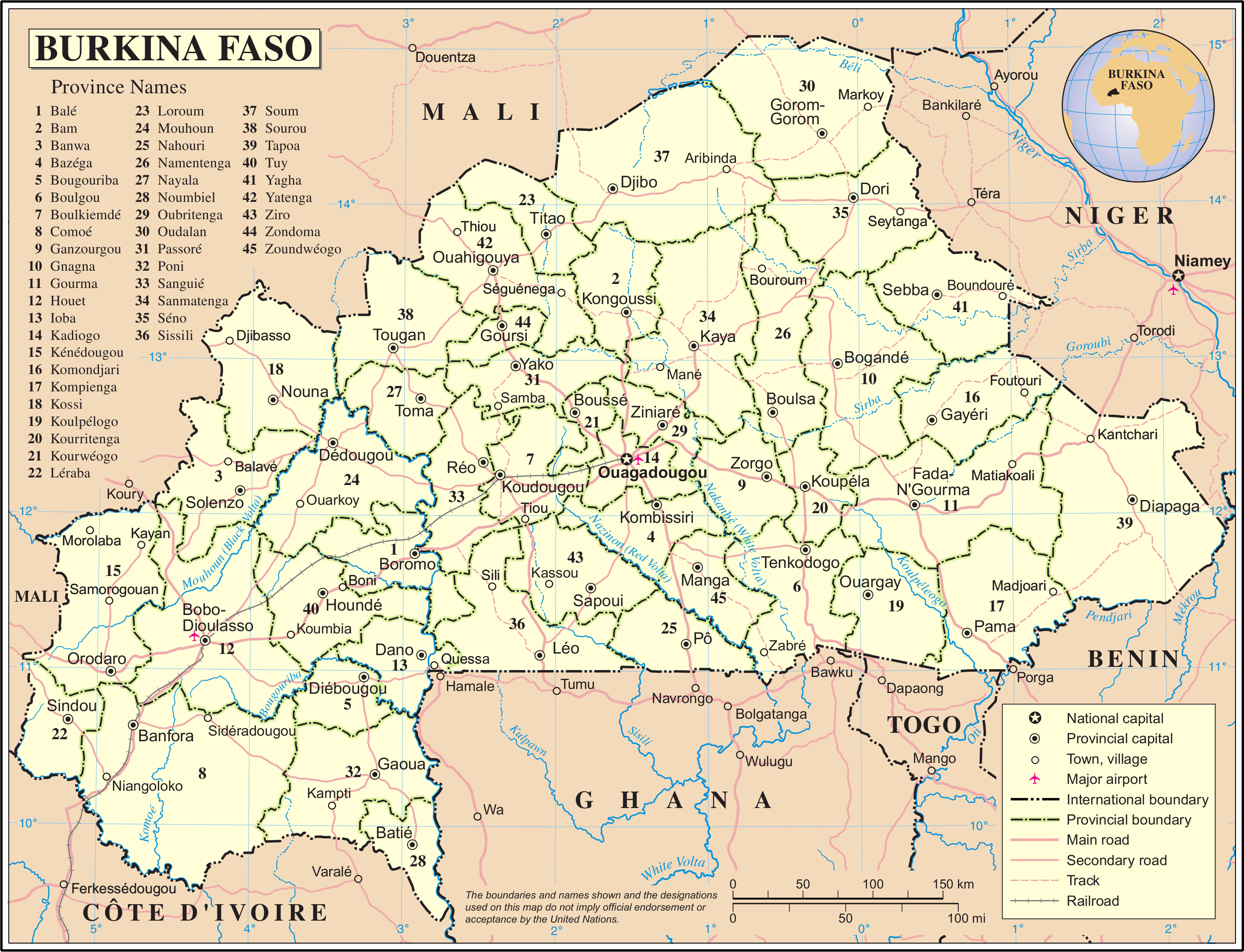
A 2007 map of Burkina Faso, including main and secondary roads, major airports, and railroad lines

Transport in Burkina Faso consists primarily of road, air and rail transportation. The World Bank classified country's transportation as underdeveloped but noted that Burkina Faso is a natural geographic transportation hub for West Africa.

== Highways ==
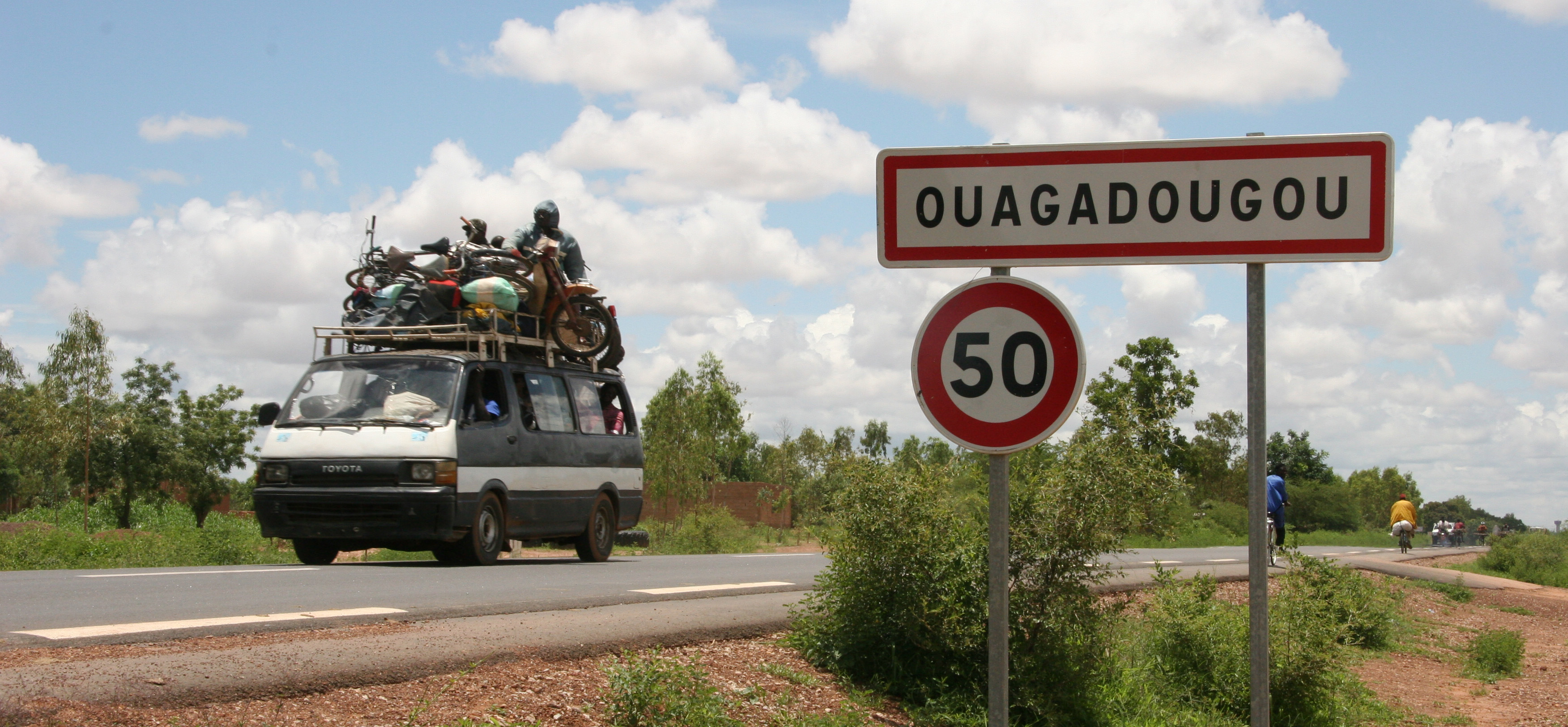
Ouagadougou road

"S. T. M. B." (Service de Transport Mixte Bangrin) at a market during a break in the bus journey from Ouagadougou to Bobo-Dioulasso. Boromo, Balé Province, Burkina Faso, 2001

In 2002, there were a total of 12,506 kilometres (7,771 mi) of highway in Burkina Faso, of which 2,001 kilometres (1,243 mi) are paved.

In 2000, the Government of Burkina Faso classified 15,000 kilometers of road as part of the national road network managed under the Ministry of Infrastructures Transport and Housing (MITH) through the Directorate of Roads (DGR). This network includes main inter-city roads and access roads for départements' capital cities. Only ten of the network's main roads are even partially paved, and the paved roads are plagued by dangerous potholes, missing signage, missing barriers and guardrails near roadside hazards, and no pavement markings to separate traffic moving in opposite directions

As of May 2011 the country's road infrastructure was rated by the World Bank to be in relatively good condition and noted that country was regional hub with paved roads linking the country to Mali, Ivory Coast, Ghana, Togo, and Niger. Nevertheless, "trucking cartels and red tape contribute to high transportation costs and diminished international competitiveness." 58% of firms in Burkina Faso identified roads as major business constraint, maintenance and rehabilitation needs of the main road network are said to be underfunded.

== Air transport ==
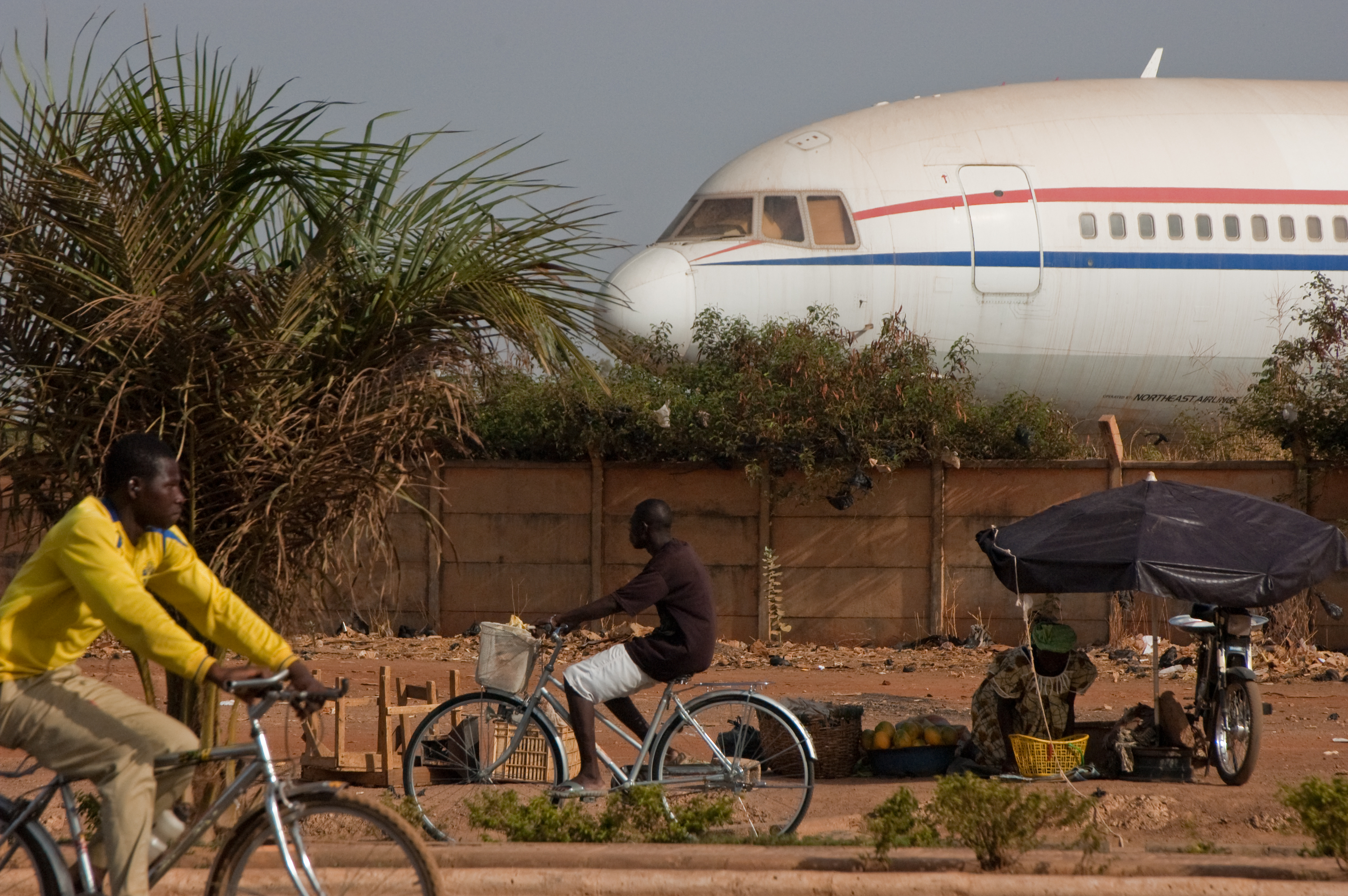
Plane in Ouagadougou

There are international airports at Ouagadougou and Bobo-Dioulasso and numerous smaller airfields. In 2004, the number of airports totaled 23, only two of which had paved runways as of 2005. Air Burkina, which began in 1967, is government-run and has a monopoly on domestic service but also flies to neighboring countries.

Ouagadougou airport handles about 98% percent of all scheduled commercial air traffic in Burkina Faso. Air Burkina and Air France handle about 60% of all scheduled passenger traffic. Between 2005 and 2011, air passenger traffic at Ouagadougou airport grew at an average annual rate of 7.0 percent per annum reaching about 404,726 passengers in 2011 and was estimated to reach 850,000 by 2025. In 2007 Ouagadougou airport was the fifteenth busiest airport in West Africa in passenger volume, just ahead of Port Harcourt (Nigeria) and behind Banjul (Gambia). The total air cargo at Ouagadougou airport grew 71% from 4,350 tons in 2005 to about 7,448 tons in 2009.

The government plans to close the Ouagadougou airport upon construction of the new Ouagadougou-Donsin Airport, approximately 35 km northeast of Ouagadougou. The new airport is expected to be completed around 2018 and the government received an $85 million loan from the World Bank to help finance the construction. The government of Burkino Faso believed that the project would cost $618 million.

== Railways ==
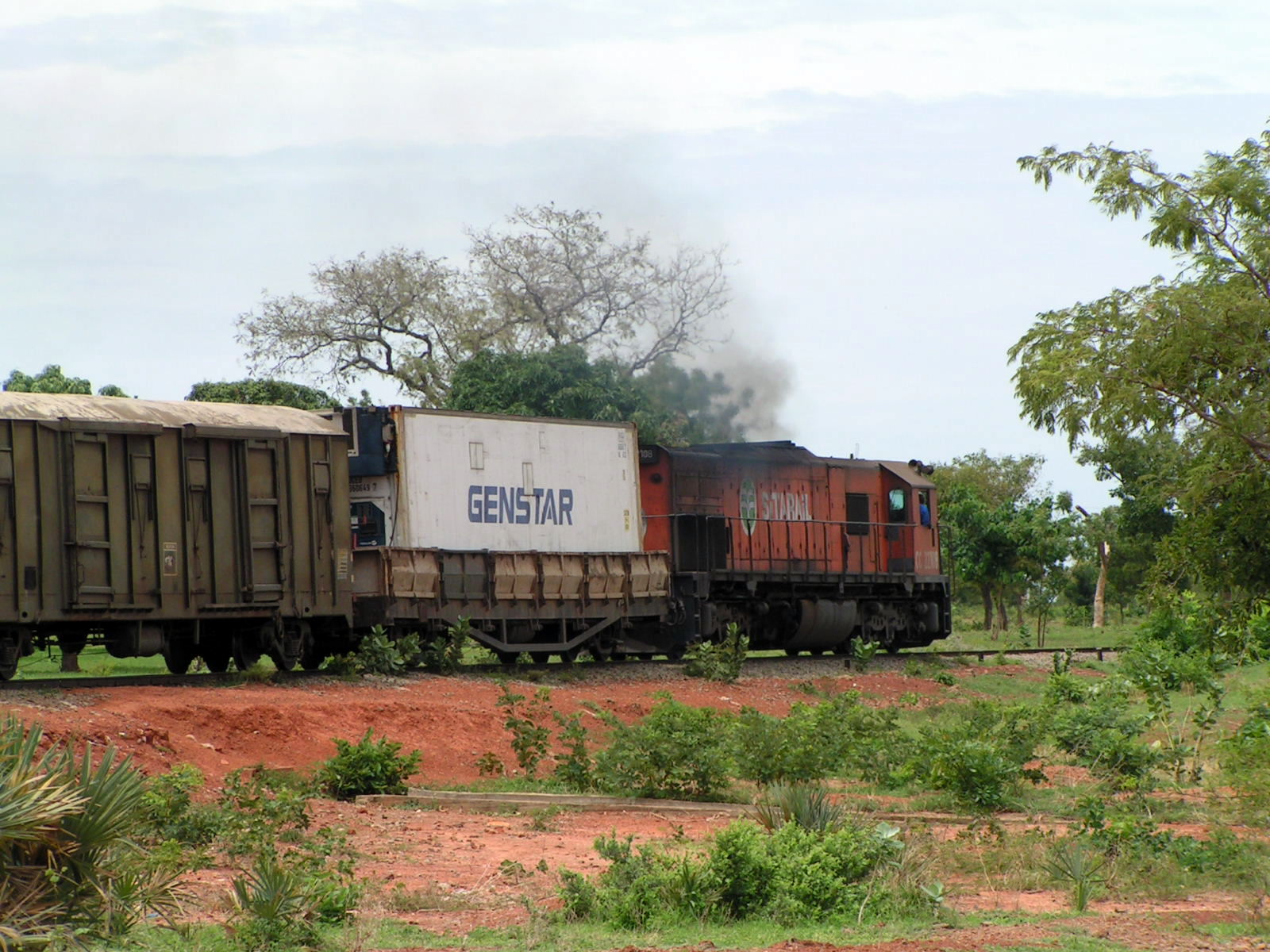
Sitarail train

There are 622 kilometres of railway in Burkina Faso, of which 517 km run from Ouagadougou to Abidjan, Ivory Coast; and 105 km from Ouagadougou to Kaya. As of June 2014 Sitarail operates a passenger train three times a week along the route from Ouagadougou to Abidjan via Banfora, Bobo-Dioulasso and Koudougou.

All of the railways in the country are of 1,000 mm (3 ft 3 3/8 in) metre gauge. Only Ivory Coast is connected to Burkina Faso by rail.

Instability in Ivory Coast in 2003 forced a rerouting of rail freight from the Abidjan corridor to ports in Togo, Benin, and Ghana via the road network. A proposed rail link between Ouagadougou and Pô in Burkina Faso and Kumasi and Boankra in Ghana, is progressing in 2025. Burkina Faso and Ghana will both use Standard gauge

In 2006, an Indian proposal surfaced to link the railways in Benin and Togo with landlocked Niger and Burkina Faso. Additionally, a Czech proposal also surfaced to link Ghana railways with Burkina Faso. The manganese deposits near Dori are one source of traffic. Burkina Faso would also be a participant in the AfricaRail project.

In May, 2011 the World Bank reported that Sitarail had recovered well from the political crisis in Ivory Coast but was experiencing financial distress, needed to re-balance its financial structure and find alternative funding for rehabilitation backlog.

=== Stations served ===
The following towns of Burkina Faso are served by the country's railways:

- Banfora
- Bobo-Dioulasso
- Koudougou
- Ouagadougou - national capital
- Kaya - terminus

== Customs and trade facilitation ==
Under a joint ministerial order of 15 September 2009, cargo to or from Burkina Faso must be covered by an electronic cargo tracking note (bordereau électronique de suivi de cargaison, BESC), established by the shipper or its agent and validated by the Burkinabè Shippers' Council. Each maritime bill of lading or multimodal transport document requires at least one note, and its number must be entered on the customs declaration, which the customs service checks during clearance.

== See also ==
- West Africa Regional Rail Integration
