= Banfora =

City in the Cascades Region, Burkina Faso

- City
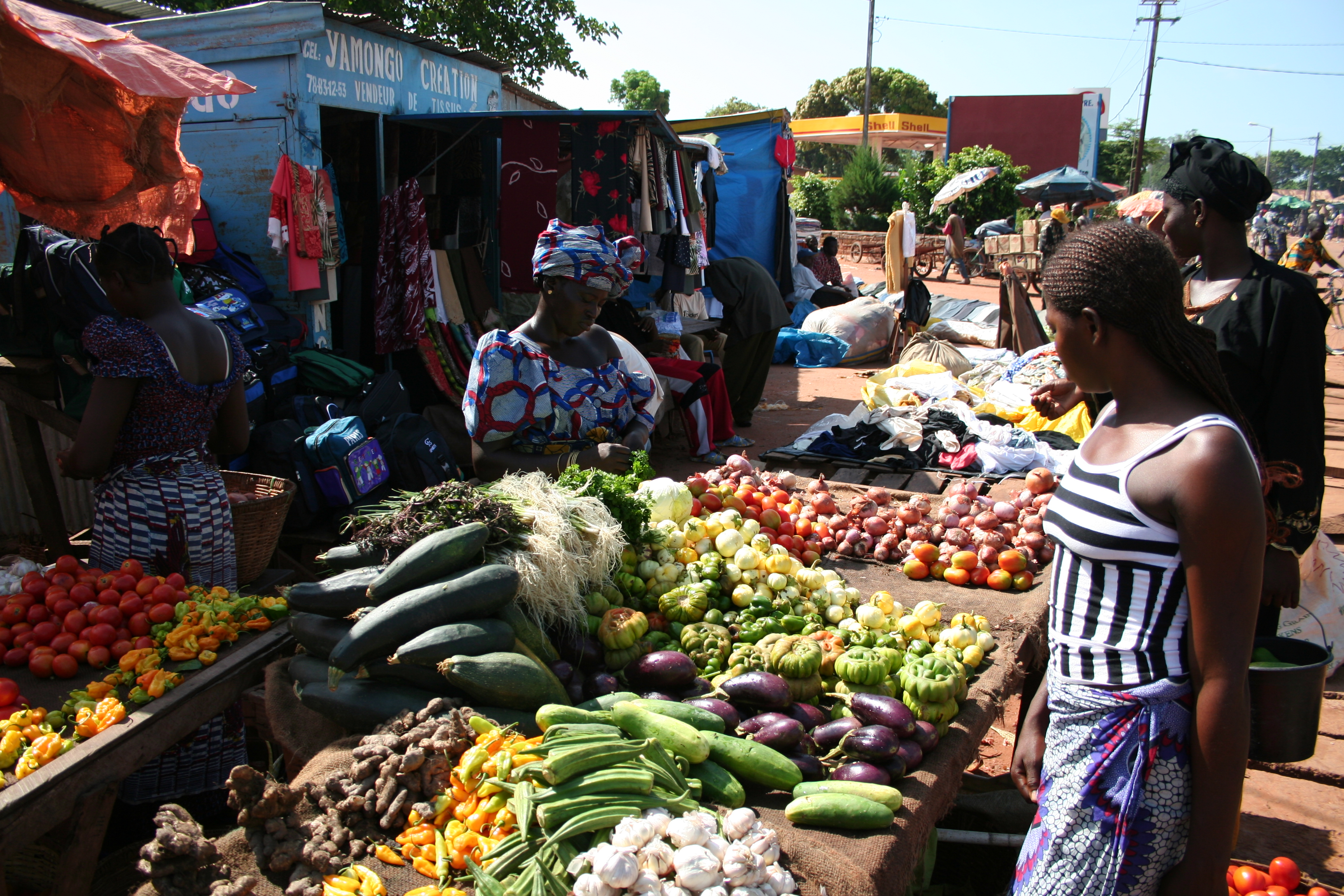
- Banfora market

- Location within Burkina Faso
- Coordinates: 10°37′51″N 4°45′32″W
- Country: Burkina Faso
- Region: Tannounyan
- Province: Comoé
- Elevation: 303 m (994 ft)

Population (2019 census)
  - Total: 117,452
- Time zone: UTC+0 (GMT)
- Area code: +226 209

Banfora is a city in southwestern Burkina Faso, with a population of 117,452 (2019 census) making it the sixth most populous city in Burkina Faso. It is the capital of the Comoe province. The city lies 85 kilometres (53 mi) south-west of Bobo-Dioulasso, on the Abidjan–Ouagadougou railway. The Cascades de Karfiguéla are a series of waterfalls close to Banfora.

== History ==
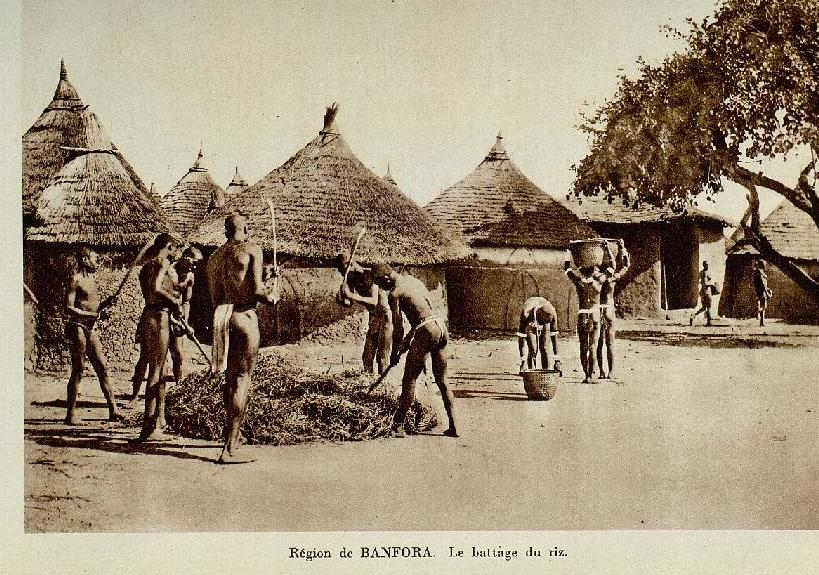
A village scene from the area around Banfora, 1931

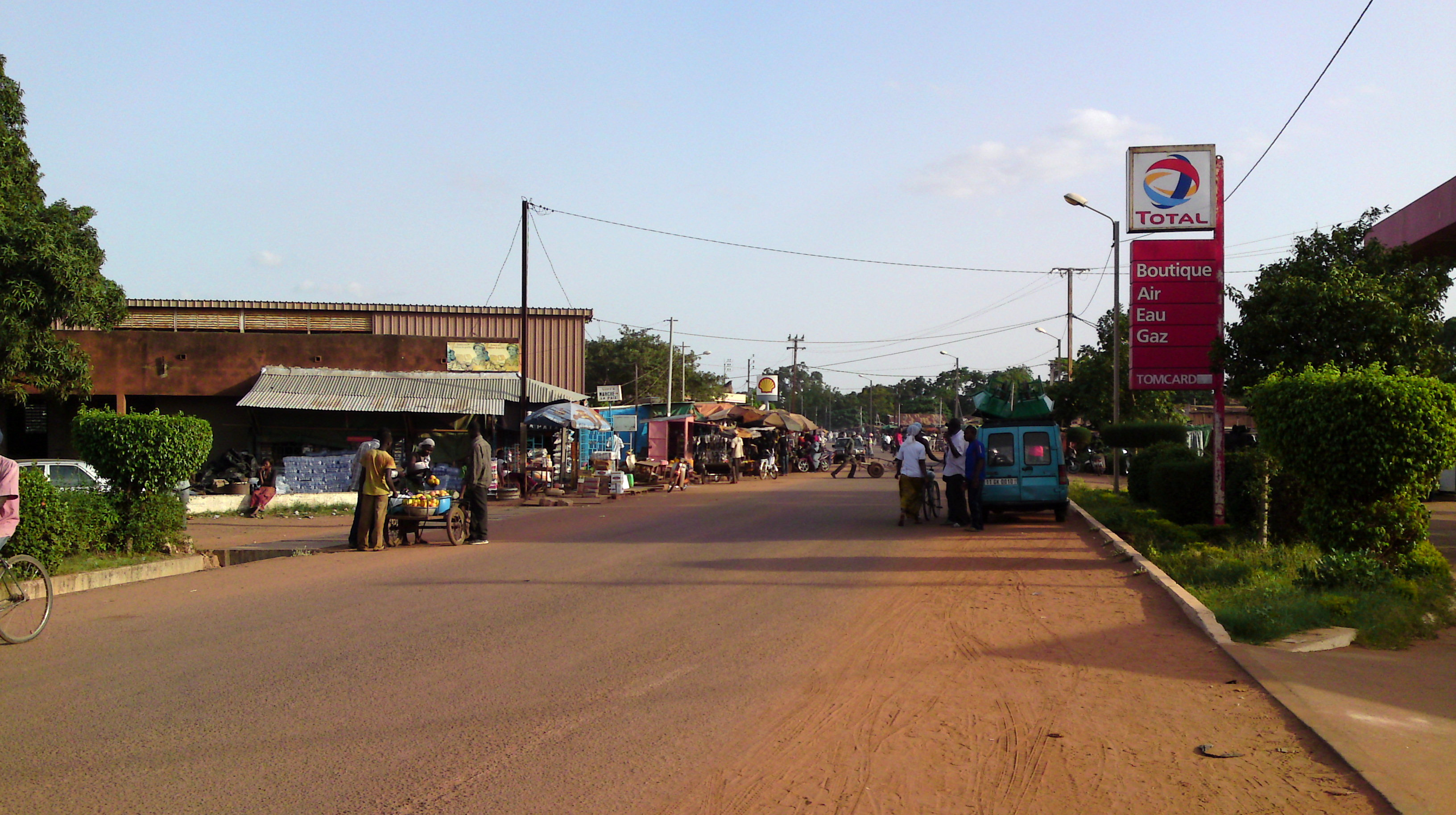
Street in Banfora

The first settlers were the Karaboro who with the Gouin and Turkas constitute the city's main ethnic groups. They are all from the south of Burkina Faso.

In 1903 the French colonialist forces created a military post at Banfora and one year later created an administrative position there. In 1905 a road was built linking Banfora to Bobo-Dioulasso and in 1931 a railway was built to the town.

== Economy ==
The economy has grown around the sugar cane industry. The city is also an important market town and there are hotels which support a small tourism industry linked to the Cascades de Karfiguéla.

== Transportation ==
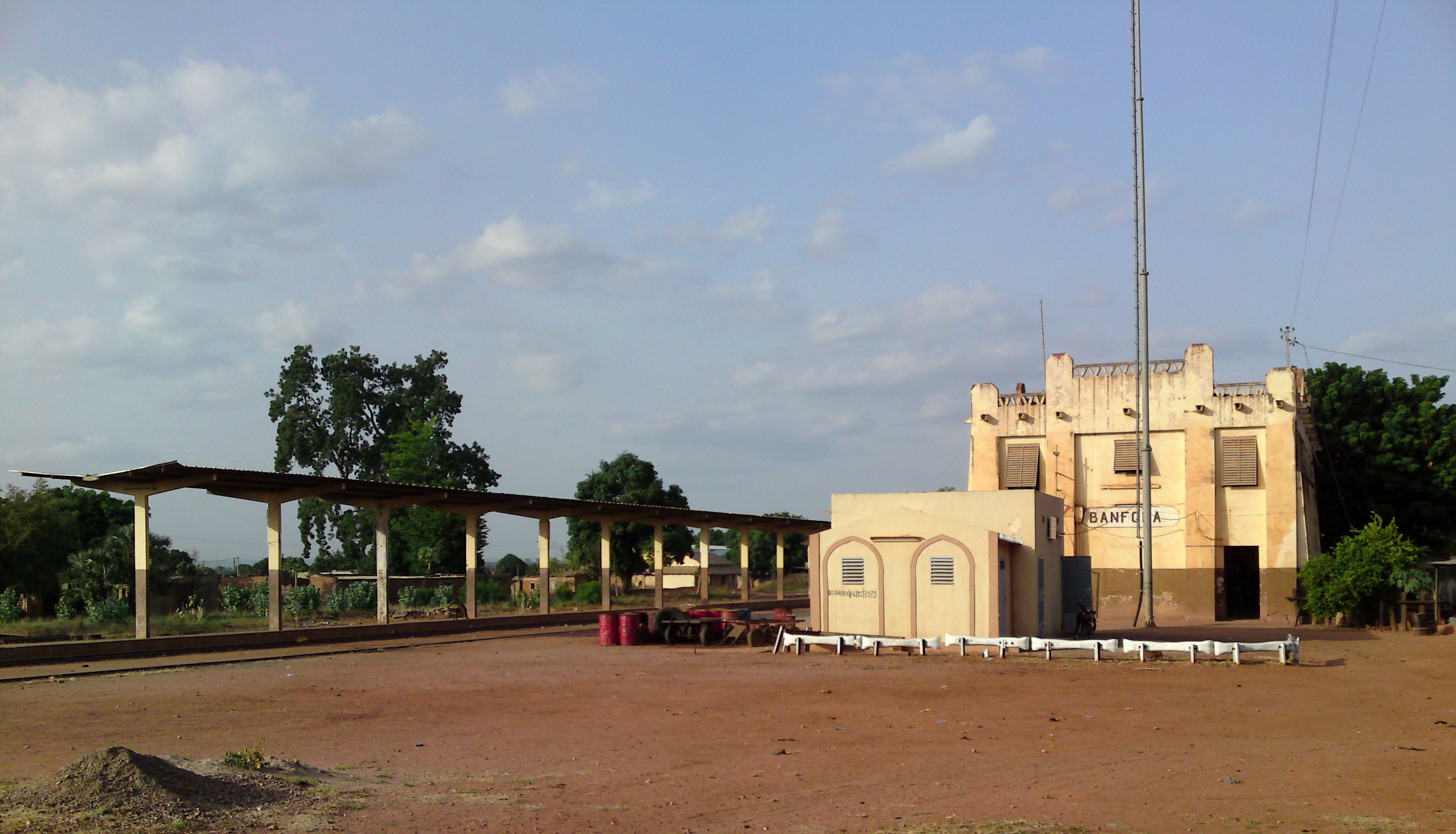
Banfora train station

The city has a railroad station along the Abidjan – Ouagadougou Railway. As of June 2014 Sitarail operated a passenger train along the line three times a week in each direction. It is a way station for transport to and from Côte d'Ivoire as it is the last city in Burkina Faso before the border. The paved road from Bobo-Dioulasso continues to the border and cargo will often stop at Niangoloko before reaching customs.

== Education ==
Banfora has 19 primary schools, two high schools, four private colleges and the College of Sainte Thérèse.

== Healthcare ==
The city has a regional hospital (CHR), a maternal and infant protection unit and three pharmacies. Traditional medicine is also practiced and there is a center for traditional therapies.

== Demographics ==
The main ethnic groups are the Gouin, the Karaboro and the Turka. The most commonly used languages for communication between people of different ethnicities living in Banfora are Dioula and French.

== Climate ==
Köppen-Geiger climate classification system classifies its climate as tropical wet and dry (Aw).

Climate data for Banfora (elevation: 313m)
Month	Jan	Feb	Mar	Apr	May	Jun	Jul	Aug	Sep	Oct	Nov	Dec	Year
Mean daily maximum °C (°F)	33.6 (92.5)	35.7 (96.3)	36.9 (98.4)	36.8 (98.2)	35 (95)	32.6 (90.7)	30.8 (87.4)	30.2 (86.4)	31.1 (88.0)	33.3 (91.9)	34.9 (94.8)	33.6 (92.5)	33.7 (92.7)
Daily mean °C (°F)	25.4 (77.7)	27.8 (82.0)	29.9 (85.8)	30.7 (87.3)	29.5 (85.1)	27.5 (81.5)	26.3 (79.3)	25.9 (78.6)	26.3 (79.3)	27.4 (81.3)	27.4 (81.3)	25.5 (77.9)	27.5 (81.4)
Mean daily minimum °C (°F)	17.3 (63.1)	19.9 (67.8)	23 (73)	24.6 (76.3)	24 (75)	22.5 (72.5)	21.9 (71.4)	21.6 (70.9)	21.5 (70.7)	21.6 (70.9)	19.9 (67.8)	17.4 (63.3)	21.3 (70.2)
Average precipitation mm (inches)	1 (0.0)	5 (0.2)	22 (0.9)	56 (2.2)	109 (4.3)	136 (5.4)	209 (8.2)	282 (11.1)	187 (7.4)	64 (2.5)	12 (0.5)	3 (0.1)	1,086 (42.8)
Source: Climate-Data.org

Climate data for Banfora (elevation: 300m)
Month	Jan	Feb	Mar	Apr	May	Jun	Jul	Aug	Sep	Oct	Nov	Dec	Year
Mean daily maximum °C (°F)	33.8 (92.8)	35.7 (96.3)	37 (99)	36.7 (98.1)	35.1 (95.2)	32.8 (91.0)	31 (88)	30.3 (86.5)	31.1 (88.0)	33.4 (92.1)	35 (95)	33.6 (92.5)	33.8 (92.9)
Daily mean °C (°F)	25.6 (78.1)	27.8 (82.0)	30 (86)	30.6 (87.1)	29.6 (85.3)	27.7 (81.9)	26.5 (79.7)	25.9 (78.6)	26.3 (79.3)	27.5 (81.5)	27.5 (81.5)	25.5 (77.9)	27.5 (81.6)
Mean daily minimum °C (°F)	17.4 (63.3)	20 (68)	23.1 (73.6)	24.6 (76.3)	24.1 (75.4)	22.6 (72.7)	22 (72)	21.6 (70.9)	21.6 (70.9)	21.7 (71.1)	20 (68)	17.4 (63.3)	21.3 (70.5)
Average precipitation mm (inches)	1 (0.0)	5 (0.2)	22 (0.9)	56 (2.2)	109 (4.3)	136 (5.4)	209 (8.2)	282 (11.1)	186 (7.3)	64 (2.5)	11 (0.4)	2 (0.1)	1,083 (42.6)
Source: Climate-Data.org
