= Niangoloko =

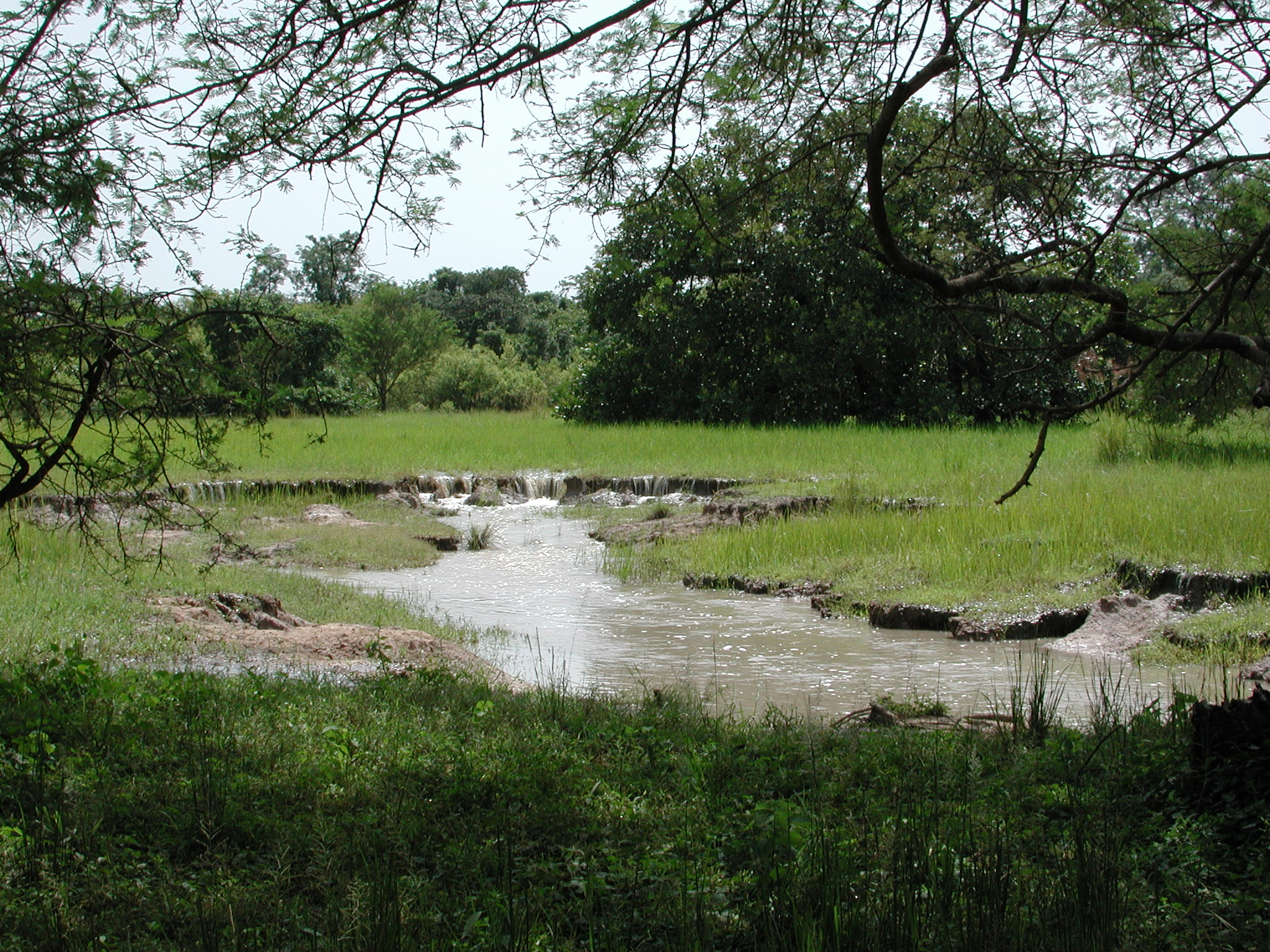
- Niangoloko Forest

- Location within Burkina Faso, West Africa
- Coordinates: 10.287896°N 4.910889°W
- Country: Burkina Faso
- Region: Cascades Region
- Province: Comoé Province
- Department: Niangoloko Department
- Elevation: 303 m (994 ft)

Population (2019 census)
  - Total: 33,292
- Time zone: UTC+0 (GMT)

Niangoloko is a town and seat of the Niangoloko Department in southwestern Burkina Faso. It is located near the city of Banfora and the border with Côte d'Ivoire. The town has a population of 33,292.

== Transport ==
The town is served by a station on the Abidjan-Ouagadougou railway. It is also connected to Banfora via regular bush taxi service.

== See also ==
- Railway stations in Burkina Faso
