= Transport in Ivory Coast =

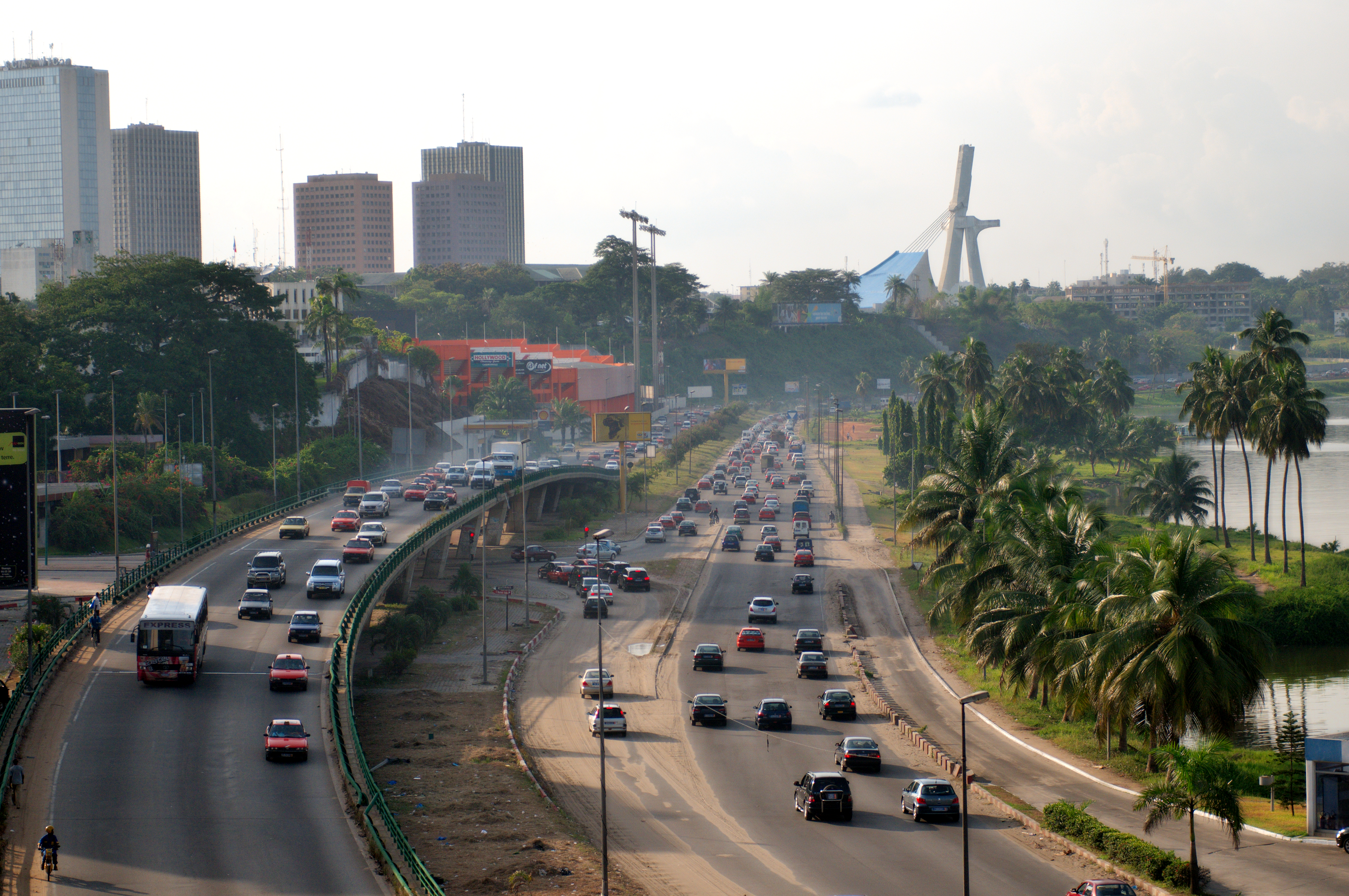

Ivory Coast invested remarkably in its transport system. Transport Infrastructures are much more developed than they are other West African countries despite a crisis that restrained their maintenance and development. Since its independence in 1960, Ivory Coast put an emphasis on increasing and modernizing the transport network for humans as well as for goods. Major infrastructures of diverse nature were built including railways, roads, waterways, and airports. In spite of the crisis, neighbor countries (Burkina Faso, Mali, Niger, and Guinea) still strongly depend on the Ivorian transport network for importing, exporting, and transiting their immigrants to Ivory Coast.

== Rail transport ==
The nation's railway system is part of a 1 260 km long route that links the country to Burkina Faso and Niger. 1 156 km of railroad links Abidjan to Ouagadougou, capital of Burkina Faso. Built during colonial era by the firm Abidjan-Niger (RAN), this railroad freed several landlocked countries among which were ex-Upper-Volta (Burkina Faso), Niger, and Mali. This railroad, operated by Sitarail, plays a key role as regards to the carriage of the goods (livestock) and the transport of people between Ivory Coast and border countries: 1 million tons of goods have transited in 2006. In 2005, despite the negative impact the crisis had on the sector, benefits engendered by transporting the goods and people via RAN, are estimated respectively at 16 309 et3 837billionCFA.

As of 2004, the railway network consisted of a state-controlled 660 km section of a 1,146 km narrow gauge railroad that ran north from Abidjan through Bouaké and Ferkéssédougou to Ouagadougou, Burkina Faso.

Railway links with adjacent countries	Towns served by rail	Maps
Burkina Faso - yes - 1,000 mm (3 ft 3 3/8 in) Ghana - no - break of gauge 1,000 mm (3 ft 3 3/8 in)/1,067 mm (3 ft 6 in) Mali - no - same gauge Guinea - no - same gauge Liberia - no - break of gauge 1,000 mm (3 ft 3 3/8 in)/1,435 mm (4 ft 8 1/2 in) and 1,067 mm (3 ft 6 in)	Abidjan Agboville Bouaké Katiola Tafire Ouangolodougou Ferkessédougou	UN Map

== Road transport ==
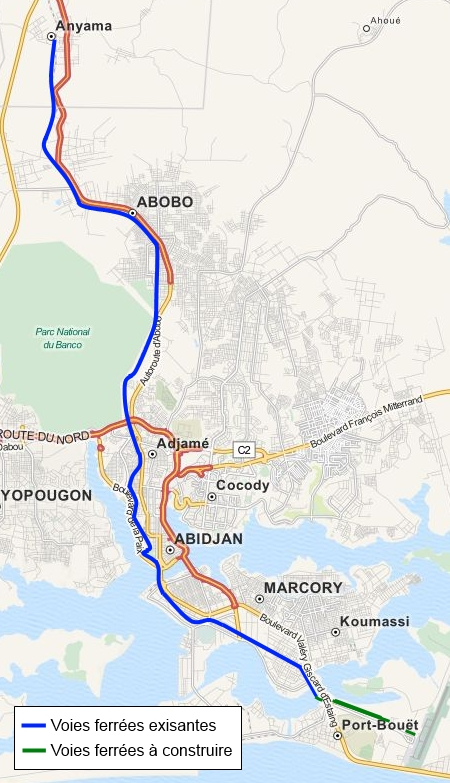
Urban traffic in Abidjan

Ivory Coast's road network spreads over 85,000 kilometers, consisting of 75,000 unpaved, 65,000 km, and 224 km highways. It provides national and international traffic with neighbor countries.

The Trans–West African Coastal Highway provides a paved link to Ghana, Togo, Benin and Nigeria, with paved highways to landlocked Mali and Burkina Faso feeding into the coastal highway. When construction of roads and bridges in Liberia and Sierra Leone is complete, the highway will link to another seven Economic Community of West African States (ECOWAS) nations to the west and north-west. At the national level, vehicles are estimated at 600 000, which includes 75% of used cars (second hand) due to the low purchasing power since the beginning of the economic crisis. 20 000 new cars are registered every year. Although maintenance and renovations works are being carried out since middle-2011, over 80% of the Ivorian network is older than 20 years and therefore damaged.

In addition, a significant traffic exists throughout Abidjan. This traffic is mainly composed of taxi, buses and mini-buses locally referred to as Gbaka.

The country counts with two 4-laned motorways, the first one running from Abidjan to Yamoussoukro for a length of 224 km., and the second joining Abidjan to Grand-Bassam, with a length of 30 km. Both are built with modern technologies and under international standards of security.

== Maritime transport ==
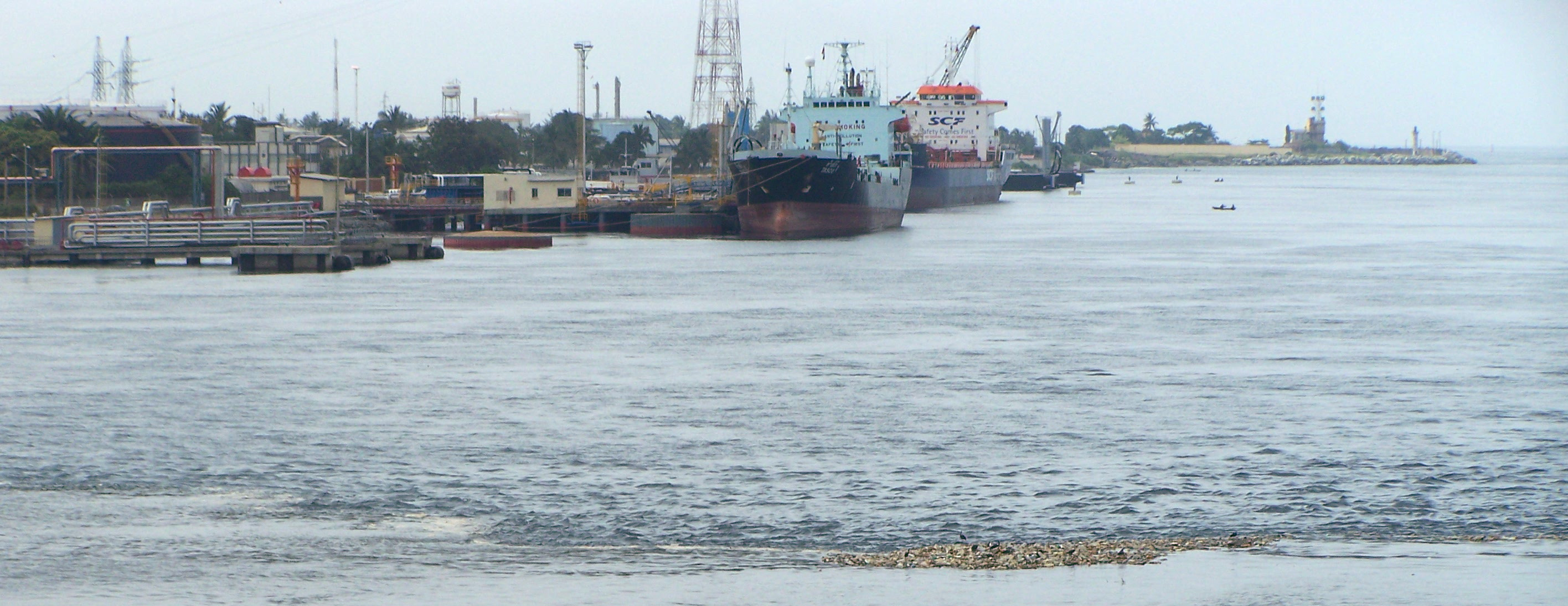
Landscape view of the Autonomous Port of Abidjan

Ivory Coast greatly contributed to developing maritime transport by building two ports on its seaside namely, autonomous port of Abidjan, sometimes referred to as "lung of Ivorian economy", and the San-Pedro port. The total traffic in 2005, by adding importation to exportation, was 18 661 784 tons for autonomous port of Abidjan and 1 001 991 tons for San-Pedro. The autonomous port of Abidjan cover a 770 hectares area and shelters 60% of the country industries. It is the first tuna fishing port in Africa. It contains 36 conventional berths spread over six kilometers of quays providing a capacity of sixty commercial ships with multiple special docks, a container terminal as well as several specialized and industrial berths. The other major port, the San-Pedro port, operates since 1971 and has two quays covering 18,727 m^{2} area. Apart from those two major ports, there are also small ports at Sassandra, Aboisso, and Dabou.

Ivory Coast requires a Bordereau Électronique de Suivi des Cargaisons (BSC or BESC) certificate for all cargo shipped to its ports. This document records key shipment details and helps authorities monitor maritime trade and customs procedures.

== Air transport ==
Ivory Coast has three international airports located in Abidjan, Yamoussoukro, and Bouaké. Fourteen smaller cities also possess regional airports, the most important of which are Daloa, Korhogo, Man, Odiénné and San-pédro. Twenty-seven aerodromes exists and are operated by a public establishment, the Anam (National agency for civil aviation and meteorology), except the activities carried out by the Asecna (Agency for security of air freight in Africa and Madagascar).

Since the outbreak of the crisis, only five of these airports are available. These are Abidjan, San-Pédro, Yamoussoukro, Daloa, and Touba. Regarding the International Airport of Abidjan, official statistics from 2005, showed 14 257 commercial movements (departures and arrivals); 745 180 commercial passengers (arrivals, departures, and transit) and 12 552 tons of commercial fret. The Airport of Abidjan covers 90% of the air traffic of Côte d'Ivoire and generate 95% of the overall profits of the sector.

The airport of Abidjan is operated by a private company, Aeria, created in association with the Commerce Chamber of Marseilles. Its traffic mainly encompasses European aeronautical companies (Air France, Brussels Airlines) and some African firms (South African Airways, Kenya Airways, Air Sénégal International).
