= AfricaRail =

Project to link West African national railway systems

AfricaRail is a project to link the 1,000 mm (3 ft 3 3/8 in) gauge railway systems of Ivory Coast, Burkina Faso, Niger, Benin and Togo. A future proposal is to link Mali, Senegal, Nigeria and Ghana—which have different gauges—to the system.

== Description ==
AfricaRail is a project that proposes to link the railway systems of Ivory Coast, Burkina Faso, Niger, Benin and Togo. These are all 1,000 mm (3 ft 3 3/8 in) gauge.

A future stage is proposed to link Mali, Senegal, which are also 1,000 mm (3 ft 3 3/8 in) gauge; Nigeria and Ghana have a different narrow gauge of 1,067 mm (3 ft 6 in) but are converting to 1,435 mm (4 ft 8 1/2 in).

== History ==
2015

Various links.

- West African rail loop of 2740 km.
- (Ivory Coast) Abidjan to (Burkina Faso) Ouagadougou line.
- Proposed new 1000mm gauge line linking Niger and Parakou in Benin
- Rehabilitation of the existing line from Parakou to port of Cotonou in Benin.
- New link to Lomé in Togo.

On 8 April 2019, Ghana's Ministry of Railway Development reached an agreement with GERC to construct the Tema - Accra - Koforidua - Kumasi eastern line, which spans 340 kilometres (210 mi).

In 2020, the government of Ghana ordered new standard gauge rail equipment, and the Ghana Eastern SG line was approved.

In 2022, the businessman Jeremie Taieb became the Head of the Strategic Steering Committee, in order to get financing for the project from international donors.

In April of 2025, a standard gauge (1435mm) "Sahel Railway", connecting the landlocked countries of Mali, Burkina Faso and Niger, was announced. This railway would be paid for by the nationalisation of the gold, uranium and cotton industries in these Sahel countries, as well as remittances from national diaspora.

== See also ==
- Dakar-Port Sudan Railway
- ECOWAS rail
- West Africa Regional Rail Integration
