= Balanfodougou =

- Village
- Location in Ivory Coast
- Coordinates: 9°37′N 4°17′W
- Country: Ivory Coast
- District: Zanzan
- Region: Bounkani
- Department: Téhini
- Sub-prefecture: Tougbo
- Time zone: UTC+0 (GMT)

Balanfodougou is a village in north-eastern Ivory Coast. It is in the sub-prefecture of Tougbo, Téhini Department, Bounkani Region, Zanzan District. It lies 4 kilometers north of the Komoé River.
