= Varalé =

- Village
- Location in Ivory Coast
- Coordinates: 9°40′N 3°17′W
- Country: Ivory Coast
- District: Zanzan
- Region: Bounkani
- Department: Doropo
- Sub-prefecture: Doropo
- Time zone: UTC+0 (GMT)

Varalé is a village in northeastern Ivory Coast. It is in the sub-prefecture of Doropo, Doropo Department, Bounkani Region, Zanzan District.

Varalé was a commune until March 2012, when it became one of 1,126 communes nationwide that were abolished.
