= Kounzié =

- Village
- Location in Ivory Coast
- Coordinates: 9°28′N 3°24′W
- Country: Ivory Coast
- District: Zanzan
- Region: Bounkani
- Department: Doropo
- Sub-prefecture: Niamoué
- Time zone: UTC+0 (GMT)

Kounzié is a village in north-eastern Ivory Coast. It is in the sub-prefecture of Niamoué, Doropo Department, Bounkani Region, Zanzan District.

Kounzié was a commune until March 2012, when it became one of 1,126 communes nationwide that were abolished.
