= Kotronou =

- Village
- Location in Ivory Coast
- Coordinates: 7°47′N 3°41′W
- Country: Ivory Coast
- District: Zanzan
- Region: Gontougo
- Department: Koun-Fao
- Sub-prefecture: Kouassi-Datékro
- Time zone: UTC+0 (GMT)

Kotronou is a village in eastern Ivory Coast. It is in the sub-prefecture of Kouassi-Datékro, Koun-Fao Department, Gontougo Region, Zanzan District.

Kotronou was a commune until March 2012, when it became one of 1,126 communes nationwide that were abolished.
