= Kineta, Ivory Coast =

Kineta
- Village
- Location in Ivory Coast
- Coordinates: 8°52′N 2°47′W
- Country: Ivory Coast
- District: Zanzan
- Region: Bounkani
- Department: Bouna
- Sub-prefecture: Ondéfidouo
- Elevation: 310 m (1,020 ft)
- Time zone: UTC+0 (GMT)

Kineta is a village in north-eastern Ivory Coast. It is in the sub-prefecture of Ondéfidouo, Bouna Department, Bounkani Region, Zanzan District. Kineta is near the border with Ghana.

Kineta is at an altitude of 310 metres (1020 feet). The population within 7 kilometres (4.3 miles) of Kineta is approximately 596.
