= Kineta (disambiguation) =

Kineta may refer to:

- Kineta, a town in West Attica, Greece
- Kineta, Ivory Coast, a village in Ivory Coast
- Kineta (skipper), a genus of skipper butterflies
- Kineta (film), a 2005 Greek film

== See also ==
- Kinetta Camera
