= Bogofa =

- Town and sub-prefecture
- Location in Ivory Coast
- Coordinates: 8°37′N 3°9′W
- Country: Ivory Coast
- District: Zanzan
- Region: Bounkani
- Department: Nassian

Population (2014)
  - Total: 5,486
- Time zone: UTC+0 (GMT)

Bogofa is a town in north-eastern Ivory Coast. It is a sub-prefecture of Nassian Department in Bounkani Region, Zanzan District.

Bogofa was a commune until March 2012, when it became one of 1,126 communes nationwide that were abolished.

In 2013, the Hadja Ouattara Nabintou Cissé Mosque was opened in the town.

In 2014, the population of the sub-prefecture of Bogofa was 5,486.

== Villages ==
The three villages of the sub-prefecture of Bogofa and their population in 2014 are:

1. Bodé (1,527)
2. Farako (2,492)
3. Gouméré (1,467)
