= Gogo, Ivory Coast =

Gogo
- Town and sub-prefecture
- Location in Ivory Coast
- Coordinates: 9°46′N 3°31′W
- Country: Ivory Coast
- District: Zanzan
- Region: Bounkani
- Department: Téhini

Population (2014)
  - Total: 11,535
- Time zone: UTC+0 (GMT)

Gogo is a town in north-eastern Ivory Coast. It is a sub-prefecture of Téhini Department in Bounkani Region, Zanzan District.

Gogo was a commune until March 2012, when it became one of 1,126 communes nationwide that were abolished.

In 2014, the population of the sub-prefecture of Gogo was 11,535.

== Villages ==
The forty-six villages of the sub-prefecture of Gogo and their population in 2014 are:

1. Banvayo (871)
2. Barriéra (240)
3. Bati-Lindé (174)
4. Batiyal (295)
5. Bielmi Simité (118)
6. Binguétan (360)
7. Boki (334)
8. Danfo (146)
9. Difita (218)
10. Dihinaper-Boba (334)
11. Gbounougbara (167)
12. Gogo (1,006)
13. Goré-Sémité (103)
14. Goré-Tonti (178)
15. Gouléguétan (187)
16. Govitan (453)
17. Guilégnora (280)
18. Handa (160)
19. Hêdinawiri (152)
20. Hempami (65)
21. Kiélo-Kérenko (226)
22. Kiéro (509)
23. Kintipa (193)
24. Kiwé (36)
25. Kohodé (212)
26. Koroho (256)
27. Kouissiéra (310)
28. Kprovitan (248)
29. Lagbo - Tadjoté (382)
30. Minitcho (253)
31. Nata-Tiokpolo (130)
32. Negan (71)
33. Nota-Kuro (195)
34. Omikaye (107)
35. Poumigué (346)
36. Sankaoura (193)
37. Sénako (214)
38. Sinédouo (64)
39. Soronvié (114)
40. Soudana (191)
41. Tara (49)
42. Tchotchorotcho (129)
43. Tiébitienko (283)
44. Touramé (198)
45. Trikongo (660)
46. Vinvérana (125)
