= Bouko =

Bouko Bouka
- Town and sub-prefecture
- Location in Ivory Coast
- Coordinates: 9°29′N 3°10′W
- Country: Ivory Coast
- District: Zanzan
- Region: Bounkani
- Department: Bouna

Population (2014)
  - Total: 15,319
- Time zone: UTC+0 (GMT)

Bouko (also spelled Bouka) is a town in north-eastern Ivory Coast. It is a sub-prefecture of Bouna Department in Bounkani Region, Zanzan District.

Bouko was a commune until March 2012, when it became one of 1,126 communes nationwide that were abolished. In 2014, the population of the sub-prefecture of Bouko was 15,319.

== Villages ==
The eighty five villages of the sub-prefecture of Bouko and their population in 2014 are:

1. Bidandouo (43)
2. Bidjédouo (103)
3. Biéligninadouo (151)
4. Bieltadouo (65)
5. Bipirédouo (274)
6. Bissamdouo (68)
7. Bognira 2 (Koyaladouo) (137)
8. Bognira 3 (Binguidouo) (109)
9. Bognira 4 (50)
10. Bognira1 (Dolodouo) (51)
11. Bomandouo (150)
12. Bonfilé 1 (476)
13. Bonfilé 2 (113)
14. Bouko (1,952)
15. Dabira (124)
16. Dabordouo (474)
17. Daboudouo (54)
18. Dahoudouo (101)
19. Dalo Ou Dougboudouo (133)
20. Damaldouo (185)
21. Dardouo (50)
22. Daridion (221)
23. Dasseyo 1 (164)
24. Dèbrodouo (79)
25. Dinabadouo (201)
26. Diokordouo (111)
27. Djapérédouo (175)
28. Djélékodouo (71)
29. Djorgnadouo (305)
30. Fatanadouo (23)
31. Gnadouo (28)
32. Gnemta (381)
33. Kando (225)
34. Kangnaldouo (75)
35. Kelfara (106)
36. Kelmita (52)
37. Kerantedouo (75)
38. Kergbodouo (78)
39. Kokadouo (215)
40. Kolindouo (143)
41. Kolontira (134)
42. Konondouo (155)
43. Kouédidouo (334)
44. Kouemidouo (100)
45. Koulbi (50)
46. Kpiko (141)
47. Krikpadouo (321)
48. Loumpèdouo (41)
49. Malandouo (100)
50. Mihadouo (130)
51. Moulèdouo (85)
52. Nakoudouo (59)
53. Nakoudouo 2 (80)
54. Namidouo (137)
55. Nandjogdi (157)
56. Noproudouo (243)
57. Nossouondouo (130)
58. N'séméra (168)
59. Ounankodouo (141)
60. Panzagani (1,444)
61. Pétounondouo (215)
62. Sébinandouo (162)
63. Séfahiridouo (349)
64. Sékioudouo (252)
65. Sépridouo (268)
66. Sindénandouo (245)
67. Tchatchardouo (102)
68. Tchédidouo (49)
69. Tchitchidouo (114)
70. Tchogbolodadouo (78)
71. Tchokodouo 2 (138)
72. Tèdjildouo (187)
73. Téfrodouo (21)
74. Tékouédouo (108)
75. Tindodouo (135)
76. Titchadouo (82)
77. Vilayo (129)
78. Wabidjoudouo (95)
79. Wamidouo (107)
80. Wanahidouo (245)
81. Watchadouo (127)
82. Yanérédouo (131)
83. Yanidouo (70)
84. Yayabougou (119)
85. Yolanko (50)
