= Koutouba =

- Town and sub-prefecture
- Location in Ivory Coast
- Coordinates: 8°41′N 3°12′W
- Country: Ivory Coast
- District: Zanzan
- Region: Bounkani
- Department: Nassian

Population (2014)
  - Total: 5,705
- Time zone: UTC+0 (GMT)

Koutouba is a town in north-eastern Ivory Coast. It is a sub-prefecture of Nassian Department in Bounkani Region, Zanzan District.

Koutouba was a commune until March 2012, when it became one of 1,126 communes nationwide that were abolished.

In 2014, the population of the sub-prefecture of Koutouba was 5,705.

== Villages ==
The nine villages of the sub-prefecture of Koutouba and their population in 2014 were:

- Allanikro (328)
- Digba (335)
- Gbrombiré (1,349)
- Kotouba (1,076)
- Lambira (828)
- Ouakorididjo (87)
- Primou (220)
- Saboukpa (958)
- Sèwè (524)
