= Pambasso =

- Village
- Location in Ivory Coast
- Coordinates: 7°37′N 3°8′W
- Country: Ivory Coast
- District: Zanzan
- Region: Gontougo
- Department: Transua
- Sub-prefecture: Transua
- Time zone: UTC+0 (GMT)

Pambasso is a village in eastern Ivory Coast. It is in the sub-prefecture of Transua, Transua Department, Gontougo Region, Zanzan District.

Until 2012, Pambasso was in the commune of Pambasso-Diédou. In March 2012, Pambasso-Diédou became one of 1,126 communes nationwide that were abolished.
