= Nassian =

- Town, sub-prefecture, and commune
- Location in Ivory Coast
- Coordinates: 8°27′N 3°28′W
- Country: Ivory Coast
- District: Zanzan
- Region: Bounkani
- Department: Nassian

Population (2014)
  - Total: 19,971
- Time zone: UTC+0 (GMT)

Nassian is a town in northeastern Ivory Coast. It is a sub-prefecture of and the seat of Nassian Department in Bounkani Region, Zanzan District. Nassian is also a commune.
