= Danoa =

- Town and sub-prefecture
- Location in Ivory Coast
- Coordinates: 9°41′N 3°5′W
- Country: Ivory Coast
- District: Zanzan
- Region: Bounkani
- Department: Doropo

Population (2014)
  - Total: 6,902
- Time zone: UTC+0 (GMT)

Danoa is a town in the far northeast of Ivory Coast, adjacent to the border with Burkina Faso. It is a sub-prefecture of Doropo Department in Bounkani Region, Zanzan District.

Danoa was a commune until March 2012, when it became one of 1,126 communes nationwide that were abolished. In 2014, the population of the sub-prefecture of Tagadi was 34,440.

== Villages ==
The seven villages of the sub-prefecture of Tagadi and their population in 2014 are:

1. Bandolé (3,914)
2. Kamala (8,303)
3. Kohodio (2,248)
4. Marahui (11,438)
5. Poukoubè (2,109)
6. Sangabili (1,047)
7. Tagadi (5,381)
