= Téhini =

- Town, sub-prefecture, and commune
- Location in Ivory Coast
- Coordinates: 9°36′N 3°40′W
- Country: Ivory Coast
- District: Zanzan
- Region: Bounkani
- Department: Téhini

Population (2014)
  - Total: 15,122
- Time zone: UTC+0 (GMT)

Téhini is a town in northeastern Ivory Coast. It is a sub-prefecture of and the seat of Téhini Department in Bounkani Region, Zanzan District. Téhini is also a commune.

In 2014, the population of the sub-prefecture of Téhini was 15,122.
