= Kakpin =

- Town and sub-prefecture
- Location in Ivory Coast
- Coordinates: 8°39′N 3°47′W
- Country: Ivory Coast
- District: Zanzan
- Region: Bounkani
- Department: Nassian

Population (2014)
  - Total: 7,040
- Time zone: UTC+0 (GMT)

Kakpin is a town in north-eastern Ivory Coast. It is a sub-prefecture of Nassian Department in Bounkani Region, Zanzan District.

Kakpin was a commune until March 2012, when it became one of 1,126 communes nationwide that were abolished.

In 2014, the population of the sub-prefecture of Kakpin was 7,040.

== Villages ==
The six villages of the sub-prefecture of Kakpin and their population in 2014 are:

1. Banvayo (1,599)
2. Gansé (1,940)
3. Kakpin (891)
4. Kapé (643)
5. Solokaye (293)
6. Zamou (1,674)
