= Takikro =

- Village
- Location in Ivory Coast
- Coordinates: 7°14′N 2°58′W
- Country: Ivory Coast
- District: Zanzan
- Region: Gontougo
- Department: Koun-Fao
- Sub-prefecture: Kokomian
- Time zone: UTC+0 (GMT)

Takikro is a village in the far east of Ivory Coast. It is in the sub-prefecture of Kokomian, Koun-Fao Department, Gontougo Region, Zanzan District. Just over one hundred metres northeast of the village is a border crossing with Ghana.

Takikro was a commune until March 2012, when it became one of 1,126 communes nationwide that were abolished.
