= Guiendé =

- Village
- Location in Ivory Coast
- Coordinates: 7°51′N 3°6′W
- Country: Ivory Coast
- District: Zanzan
- Region: Gontougo
- Department: Tanda
- Sub-prefecture: Tanda
- Time zone: UTC+0 (GMT)

Guiendé is a village in eastern Ivory Coast. It is in the sub-prefecture of Tanda, Tanda Department, Gontougo Region, Zanzan District.

Guiendé was a commune until March 2012, when it became one of 1,126 communes nationwide that were abolished.
