= N'Guessan-Brindoukro =

- Village
- Location in Ivory Coast
- Coordinates: 7°6′N 3°5′W
- Country: Ivory Coast
- District: Zanzan
- Region: Gontougo
- Department: Koun-Fao
- Sub-prefecture: Tienkoikro
- Time zone: UTC+0 (GMT)

N'Guessan-Brindoukro is a village in the far east of Ivory Coast. It is in the sub-prefecture of Tienkoikro, Koun-Fao Department, Gontougo Region, Zanzan District. The village is five kilometres west and four kilometres north of the border with Ghana.

N'Guessan-Brindoukro was a commune until March 2012, when it became one of 1,126 communes nationwide that were abolished.
