= Youndouo =

- Town and sub-prefecture
- Location in Ivory Coast
- Coordinates: 8°49′N 2°58′W
- Country: Ivory Coast
- District: Zanzan
- Region: Bounkani
- Department: Bouna

Population (2014)
  - Total: 12,602
- Time zone: UTC+0 (GMT)

Youndouo is a town in northeastern Ivory Coast. It is a sub-prefecture of Bouna Department in Bounkani Region, Zanzan District.

Youndouo was a commune until March 2012, when it became one of 1,126 communes nationwide that were abolished.

In 2014, the population of the sub-prefecture of Youndouo was 12,602.

== Villages ==
The twelve villages of the sub-prefecture of Youndouo and their population in 2014 are:

1. Dihintédouo (1,061)
2. Dihodouo (297)
3. Dikotédouo (1,202)
4. Fotibdouo 2 (519)
5. Gboronkildouo (1,587)
6. Gommidouo (289)
7. Kartoudouo (1,061)
8. Kipiendouo (686)
9. Kissoptédouo (353)
10. Kontounondouo (1,353)
11. Tiboultédouo (555)
12. Youndouo (3,639)
