= Sominassé =

- Town and sub-prefecture
- Location in Ivory Coast
- Coordinates: 8°23′N 3°46′W
- Country: Ivory Coast
- District: Zanzan
- Region: Bounkani
- Department: Nassian

Population (2014)
  - Total: 6,326
- Time zone: UTC+0 (GMT)

Sominassé is a town in northeastern Ivory Coast. It is a sub-prefecture of Nassian Department in Bounkani Region, Zanzan District.

Sominassé was a commune until March 2012, when it became one of 1,126 communes nationwide that were abolished.

In 2014, the population of the sub-prefecture of Sominassé was 6,326.

== Villages ==
The eight villages of the sub-prefecture of Sominassé and their population in 2014 are:

1. Boudou (572)
2. Brovilla (649)
3. Kiramissé (787)
4. Kromabira (200)
5. Lagbayo (573)
6. Sigbagui (353)
7. Siriki-Bango (2,192)
8. Sominassé (1,000)
