= Komoé =

Komoé or Comoé may refer to:

- Komoé River
- Comoé Province, Burkina Faso
- Comoé District, Ivory Coast
- Comoé National Park, Ivory Coast
