= Tankessé =

- Town and sub-prefecture
- Location in Ivory Coast
- Coordinates: 7°21′N 3°12′W
- Country: Ivory Coast
- District: Zanzan
- Region: Gontougo
- Department: Koun-Fao

Population (2014)
  - Total: 25,378
- Time zone: UTC+0 (GMT)

Tankessé is a town in eastern Ivory Coast. It is a sub-prefecture of Koun-Fao Department in Gontougo Region, Zanzan District.

Tankessé was a commune until March 2012, when it became one of 1,126 communes nationwide that were abolished.

In 2014, the population of the sub-prefecture of Tankessé was 25,378.

== Villages ==
The twenty villages of the sub-prefecture of Tankessé and their population in 2014 are:

1. Adjéikro (266)
2. Akasso (917)
3. Akroidokikro (2,406)
4. Assempanayé (544)
5. Attakouadiokro (2,541)
6. Boffouokro (499)
7. Broukro-Banouan (528)
8. Dihinbo (1,941)
9. Koffikokorékro (975)
10. Kotokou-Ayéra (1,502)
11. Kouassi-Badoukro (841)
12. N'dakro (1,695)
13. Ouangui (880)
14. Pambariba (784)
15. Pengakro (1,013)
16. Petit-Bondoukou (355)
17. Petit-Bouaké (268)
18. Tankessé (5,387)
19. Yaokro (1,726)
20. Yoboué-Bouman (310)
