= Doropo =

- Town, sub-prefecture, and commune
- Location in Ivory Coast
- Coordinates: 9°49′N 3°21′W
- Country: Ivory Coast
- District: Zanzan
- Region: Bounkani
- Department: Doropo

Area
  - Total: 785 km^{2} (303 sq mi)

Population (2021 census)
  - Total: 48,225
  - Density: 61.4/km^{2} (159/sq mi)
  - Town: 14,388
- (2014 census)
- Time zone: UTC+0 (GMT)

Doropo is a town in the far northeast of Ivory Coast. It is a sub-prefecture of and the seat of Doropo Department in Bounkani Region, Zanzan District, adjacent to the border with Burkina Faso. Doropo is also a commune. Fifteen kilometres northwest of town is a border crossing with Burkina Faso. In 2021, the population of the sub-prefecture of Doropo was 48,225.

== Villages ==
The hundred and four villages of the sub-prefecture of Doropo and their population in 2014 are:

1. Babadjou (225)
2. Bidjinadouo 2 (171)
3. Bingora (134)
4. Dabonkiro 1 (281)
5. Dabonkiro 2 (97)
6. Dabonkiro 3 (60)
7. Dabonkiro 4 (216)
8. Doropo (14 388)
9. Kakota (222)
10. Kalambourou (276)
11. Kamassama (381)
12. Karwedouo (229)
13. Kinandouo (219)
14. Kobilou (233)
15. Kountoumbi (109)
16. Kporomi 1 (252)
17. Létcharé (158)
18. Nominéré (127)
19. Péou (53)
20. Saiko-Gbonon (98)
21. Sokorolaye (89)
22. Tchantibi 1 (180)
23. Tchantibi 2 (93)
24. Tchartchara (91)
25. Tchormidouo (50)
26. Timbiéla (171)
27. Tingo (334)
28. Tingo-Yalo (407)
29. Yolonkora (481)
30. Yolontchèra (74)
31. Angaye (895)
32. Babaldouo (211)
33. Baltan (87)
34. Banié (452)
35. Batéfigui (166)
36. Bénimbara (132)
37. Bidjinadouo 1 (210)
38. Biebdouo (85)
39. Bielfi-Letchard (289)
40. Biélpindouogbé (225)
41. Brotto (220)
42. Dakpolongui 1 (217)
43. Dakpolongui 2 (139)
44. Dambélessi (236)
45. Danagnara (60)
46. Dejlmidouo (156)
47. Déko 1 (30)
48. Dininémina (130)
49. Doundouo (81)
50. Douogbe-Guidre (354)
51. Gangatta (139)
52. Garihoussié (15)
53. Gbasséra (71)
54. Gborodouo (212)
55. Gnano - Koté (237)
56. Holara (259)
57. Kapari (142)
58. Kiamouno (128)
59. Kirkpadouo (80)
60. Kodo (604)
61. Kodo-Bissankoué (241)
62. Koguiénou (270)
63. Koiton (294)
64. Kopitédouo (116)
65. Kossamiguié (102)
66. Koudinadouo (39)
67. Kourénou (130)
68. Koutiana (347)
69. Kpaldouo (262)
70. Kpilimitédouo (105)
71. Lankio (390)
72. Lantaga (205)
73. Latrougo (308)
74. Lintéra (398)
75. Miakoura (98)
76. Nakélé (313)
77. Natantchohiè (263)
78. Niando-Tinkoi (403)
79. Niona (431)
80. Nodjodouo (125)
81. Nofardouo (103)
82. Nogatédouo (117)
83. Nounkouwouridouo (80)
84. Oulomperdouo (217)
85. Parankoyédouo (337)
86. Ponorodouo (82)
87. Proura (886)
88. Sangbanari (581)
89. Sékodouo (126)
90. Sémadouo (86)
91. Sénandi 1 (110)
92. Sénandi 2 (90)
93. Sonfordouo (686)
94. Tangbadouo (117)
95. Tesso (288)
96. Tibinandouo (378)
97. Tibroti (59)
98. Tinlou (114)
99. Tintiouri (63)
100. Tioboulonao (18)
101. Toboura 1 (158)
102. Varalé (1 032)
103. Wadara (127)
104. Youternérédouo (885)
