= Niamoué =

- Town and sub-prefecture
- Location in Ivory Coast
- Coordinates: 9°37′N 3°26′W
- Country: Ivory Coast
- District: Zanzan
- Region: Bounkani
- Department: Doropo

Population (2014)
  - Total: 16,056
- Time zone: UTC+0 (GMT)

Niamoué is a town in the far northeast of Ivory Coast. It is a sub-prefecture of Doropo Department in Bounkani Region, Zanzan District.

Niamoué was a commune until March 2012, when it became one of 1,126 communes nationwide that were abolished.

In 2014, the population of the sub-prefecture of Niamoué was 16,056.

== Villages ==
The seventy five villages of the sub-prefecture of Niamoué and their population in 2014 are:

1. Ansorpe (326)
2. Béguétimi 1 (118)
3. Béguétimi 2 (76)
4. Bélentourou (129)
5. Bidigué (76)
6. Binandouo (76)
7. Binédouo (101)
8. Bitiédouo (89)
9. Déridouo (32)
10. Ditounégnadouo 1 (316)
11. Ditounégnadouo 2 (126)
12. Djéguérigué (342)
13. Djidré-Tinlo (417)
14. Djorkpèrèdouo 1 (322)
15. Djorkpèrèdouo 2 (185)
16. Donafara (243)
17. Dorovitan (84)
18. Fangadouo (105)
19. Filédouo (123)
20. Filguitédouo (101)
21. Flinkordouo (324)
22. Garanko (72)
23. Gbana (184)
24. Gbeltan (300)
25. Gbonkolou (253)
26. Gnopardouo (159)
27. Gourkidouo (74)
28. Hébérédouo (100)
29. Himarédouo (171)
30. Kalangbapo 1 (270)
31. Kelbidouo (99)
32. Kerdadouo (44)
33. Kéremperdouo (186)
34. Kienti (240)
35. Kiérodouo (294)
36. Kokpérénaan (121)
37. Kokpérénan (810)
38. Konapé (48)
39. Koro (257)
40. Kossanadouo (168)
41. Koumandja (22)
42. Koundrédouo (112)
43. Kounyaladouo (251)
44. Kounzié (398)
45. Kourkémiri (103)
46. Kpoladouo (271)
47. Lépritedouo (47)
48. Létango (198)
49. Linki (753)
50. Mampère (215)
51. Mananko-Binin (329)
52. Mité (198)
53. Nampéli (344)
54. Napindouo (241)
55. Natibidouo (251)
56. Niamoué (1 282)
57. Noguirdouo (111)
58. Nomi-Bourié (157)
59. Poltédouo (162)
60. Saédi (253)
61. Saye (473)
62. Sayébou (60)
63. Sikparédouo (70)
64. Sobara (333)
65. Solperdouo (37)
66. Tiempira (284)
67. Tchankoudouo (56)
68. Tcharsopoute (174)
69. Tchergardouo (67)
70. Tchiassonédouo (215)
71. Tchohitédouo (307)
72. Totobi (300)
73. Woussodouo (107)
74. Yallédouo (235)
75. Yolombora (79)
