= Diamba =

- Town and sub-prefecture
- Location in Ivory Coast
- Coordinates: 7°49′N 3°19′W
- Country: Ivory Coast
- District: Zanzan
- Region: Gontougo
- Department: Tanda

Population (2014)
  - Total: 9,680
- Time zone: UTC+0 (GMT)

Diamba is a town in eastern Ivory Coast. It is a sub-prefecture of Tanda Department in Gontougo Region, Zanzan District.

Diamba was a commune until March 2012, when it became one of 1,126 communes nationwide that were abolished.

In 2014, the population of the sub-prefecture of Diamba was 9,680.

== Villages ==
The eighteen villages of the sub-prefecture of Diamba and their population in 2014 are:

1. Adjoumanibango (464)
2. Adoubango (269)
3. Aka-Yao (519)
4. Assoumanbango (144)
5. Bassapounou (511)
6. Bouko (1,694)
7. Diamba (1,023)
8. Djanzanbango (260)
9. Domambango (136)
10. Gbabango (408)
11. Kanton (305)
12. Kouadiobango (358)
13. Kouamébonikro (566)
14. Kouménagaré (228)
15. Néma (448)
16. N'graoua (545)
17. Pala (1,348)
18. Yaobango (454)
