= Kalamon, Ivory Coast =

Kalamon
- Town and sub-prefecture
- Location in Ivory Coast
- Coordinates: 9°49′N 3°10′W
- Country: Ivory Coast
- District: Zanzan
- Region: Bounkani
- Department: Doropo

Population (2014)
  - Total: 5,965
- Time zone: UTC+0 (GMT)

Kalamon is a town in the far northeast of Ivory Coast. It is a sub-prefecture of Doropo Department in Bounkani Region, Zanzan District, adjacent to the border with Burkina Faso. There is a border crossing with Burkina Faso located four kilometres northeast of town.

Kalamon was a commune until March 2012, when it became one of 1,126 communes nationwide that were abolished.

In 2014, the population of the sub-prefecture of Kalamon was 5,965.

== Villages ==
The twenty one villages of the sub-prefecture of Kalamon and their population in 2014 are:

1. Biégnon (422)
2. Binandouo (196)
3. Bissankoi (129)
4. Dékodouo (212)
5. Ditiatré (45)
6. Fafoudouo (100)
7. Gbonkodouo (115)
8. Goala (297)
9. Gobétan (172)
10. Gogombro (293)
11. Héréouèdouo (394)
12. Kahitédouo (108)
13. Kalamon (1,944)
14. Kéramira (126)
15. Lassouri (165)
16. Loukoura (382)
17. Pénouodouo (187)
18. Ponisséo (204)
19. Talo (198)
20. Tirodouo (156)
21. Tonguidouo (120)
