= Tienkoikro =

- Town and sub-prefecture
- Location in Ivory Coast
- Coordinates: 7°13′N 3°4′W
- Country: Ivory Coast
- District: Zanzan
- Region: Gontougo
- Department: Koun-Fao

Population (2014)
  - Total: 13,417
- Time zone: UTC+0 (GMT)

Tienkoikro is a town in eastern Ivory Coast. It is a sub-prefecture of Koun-Fao Department in Gontougo Region, Zanzan District.

Tienkoikro was a commune until March 2012, when it became one of 1,126 communes nationwide that were abolished.

In 2014, the population of the sub-prefecture of Tienkoikro was 13,417.

== Villages ==
The twelve villages of the sub-prefecture of Tienkoikro and their population in 2014 are:

1. Akakobénankro (662)
2. Allikouassué (1,009)
3. Assuamakro (944)
4. Attakro (844)
5. Broffouédou (567)
6. Déimba (1,991)
7. Kobenan-Bango (144)
8. Kodjinan (582)
9. M'békouadiokro (1,019)
10. N'Guessan-Brindoukro (1,466)
11. Presso (2,556)
12. Tienkoikro (1,633)
