= Tougbo =

- Town and sub-prefecture
- Location in Ivory Coast
- Coordinates: 9°46′N 4°8′W
- Country: Ivory Coast
- District: Zanzan
- Region: Bounkani
- Department: Téhini

Population (2014)
  - Total: 14,693
- Time zone: UTC+0 (GMT)

Tougbo is a town in northeastern Ivory Coast. It is a sub-prefecture of Téhini Department in Bounkani Region, Zanzan District. It’s near the border of Burkina Faso.

Tougbo was a commune until March 2012, when it became one of 1,126 communes nationwide that were abolished.

In 2014, the population of the sub-prefecture of Tougbo was 14,693.

The settlement is home to a large refugee population displaced by the Jihadist insurgency in Burkina Faso.

== Villages ==
The thirty four villages of the sub-prefecture of Tougbo and their population in 2014 are:

1. Batédi-Nord (168)
2. Bavé (771)
3. Bembéla (50)
4. Bidolotédouo (359)
5. Binintira (216)
6. Bolé (1,430)
7. Didassokoura (222)
8. Djounoudouo (388)
9. Farako 1 (75)
10. Farako 2 (204)
11. Gandé (110)
12. Gangoyou (365)
13. Gnagbata (260)
14. Gningnora (240)
15. Kalan (420)
16. Kalana-Bawé (623)
17. Karamokodjan (95)
18. Koffidouo (215)
19. Kouloumitan (415)
20. Lénagnora (588)
21. Lorogbo (163)
22. Midana (179)
23. Moro-Moro (1,185)
24. Moussokantou (246)
25. Ollodouo (306)
26. Ouango-Fitini (108)
27. Ouango-Koroho (606)
28. Saota-Sokoro (440)
29. Sessegbo (45)
30. Tchohounin (116)
31. Tobinko (89)
32. Tougbo (2,804)
33. Toungbawiri (580)
34. Touta (612)
