= Kalamon =

Kalamon may refer to:

- Kalamon Province, Greece
- Kalamon, Drama, village in Greece
- Kalamon, Ivory Coast
- Qalamoun Mountains, Syria
- Deir Hajla, monastery dedicated to St Gerasimos in Palestine, formerly called Kalamon
- Monastery of Saint Samuel the Confessor, called the Monastery of Kalamon, Egypt
- Lavra of Kalamon at the Eikoston, Egypt
- Kalamon, alternative name for the Kalamata olive
