= Tchèdio =

Tchèdio Tiédio
- Town and sub-prefecture
- Location in Ivory Coast
- Coordinates: 7°53′N 3°17′W
- Country: Ivory Coast
- District: Zanzan
- Region: Gontougo
- Department: Tanda

Population (2014)
  - Total: 10,605
- Time zone: UTC+0 (GMT)

Tchèdio (also spelled Tiédio) is a town in eastern Ivory Coast. It is a sub-prefecture of Tanda Department in Gontougo Region, Zanzan District.

Tchèdio was a commune until March 2012, when it became one of 1,126 communes nationwide that were abolished.

In 2014, the population of the sub-prefecture of Tchèdio was 10,605.

== Villages ==
The sixteen villages of the sub-prefecture of Tchèdio and their population in 2014 are:

1. Adou-Yao (119)
2. Aguina (169)
3. Anobango (162)
4. Boli (129)
5. Bossoumara (186)
6. Dalibiro (134)
7. Djandoubango (439)
8. Djanifikro (117)
9. Essikro (845)
10. Gondia (2,168)
11. Guiméré (495)
12. Lamoli (1,034)
13. Sékrébango (534)
14. Siasso (952)
15. Siengui-Sogo (744)
16. Tchèdio (2,378)
