= Transua =

- Town, sub-prefecture, and commune
- Location in Ivory Coast
- Coordinates: 7°33′N 3°1′W
- Country: Ivory Coast
- District: Zanzan
- Region: Gontougo
- Department: Transua

Population (2014)
  - Total: 36,200
- Time zone: UTC+0 (GMT)

Transua is a town in the far east of Ivory Coast. It is a sub-prefecture of and the seat of Transua Department in Gontougo Region, Zanzan District. Transua is also a commune.

In 2014, the population of the sub-prefecture of Transua was 36,200.

== Villages ==
The thirty two villages of the sub-prefecture of Transua and their population in 2014 are:

1. Ahuitiesso (2,022)
2. Akossuam (1,145)
3. Amorofikro (1,247)
4. Assuétia-Banon (685)
5. Assuétia-Kessé (1,341)
6. Attokom (774)
7. Bissassé (1,935)
8. Bénanon (207)
9. Diédou (751)
10. Kangassua (550)
11. Kassan (1,238)
12. Koihinikro (997)
13. Kouakoutanokro (401)
14. Krakro (864)
15. Kromokrom (771)
16. Krébio-Akoinkro (425)
17. Mantimandja (922)
18. Marassué (765)
19. N'détiesso-Sokoura (775)
20. Niamienbekyr (558)
21. Noumassi (535)
22. Pambasso (1,454)
23. Poko (2,667)
24. Priti 1 (1,698)
25. Priti-Ahingro (1,252)
26. Sikassua (298)
27. Souromani (1,985)
28. Taakrom (798)
29. Tanokouassikro (386)
30. Tounvokro (737)
31. Transua (4,114)
32. Yaokumkro (1,903)
