= Ondéfidouo =

- Town and sub-prefecture
- Location in Ivory Coast
- Coordinates: 9°3′N 3°5′W
- Country: Ivory Coast
- District: Zanzan
- Region: Bounkani
- Department: Bouna

Population (2014)
  - Total: 28,088
- Time zone: UTC+0 (GMT)

Ondéfidouo is a town in northeastern Ivory Coast. It is a sub-prefecture of Bouna Department in Bounkani Region, Zanzan District.

Ondéfidouo was a commune until March 2012, when it became one of 1,126 communes nationwide that were abolished.

In 2014, the population of the sub-prefecture of Ondéfidouo was 28,088.

== Villages ==
The twenty five villages of the sub-prefecture of Ondéfidouo and their population in 2014 are:

1. Bigebdouo (395)
2. Gangodouo (434)
3. Hompountédouo (509)
4. Kermatédouo (964)
5. Kinéta (1,130)
6. Kissarédouo (1,035)
7. Kontodouo (2,366)
8. Koulamboronidouo (573)
9. Koulkantédouo (665)
10. Kounandouo (335)
11. Kpokpokouédouo (697)
12. Léfitédouo (479)
13. Léomidouo (4,258)
14. Lindi (864)
15. Ondéfidouo (4,283)
16. Piayé (1,548)
17. Polédouo 2 (321)
18. Sépidouo (1,440)
19. Sitédouo (506)
20. Siyalédouo (3,243)
21. Tchalarédouo (306)
22. Tchatiédouo 2 (520)
23. Téfatédouo (162)
24. Tessodouo (983)
25. Todjirédouo (72)
