= Amanvi =

- Town and sub-prefecture
- Location in Ivory Coast
- Coordinates: 7°58′N 3°8′W
- Country: Ivory Coast
- District: Zanzan
- Region: Gontougo
- Department: Tanda

Population (2014)
  - Total: 5,312
- Time zone: UTC+0 (GMT)

Amanvi is a town in eastern Ivory Coast. It is a sub-prefecture of Tanda Department in Gontougo Region, Zanzan District.

Amanvi was a commune until March 2012, when it became one of 1,126 communes nationwide that were abolished.

In 2014, the population of the sub-prefecture of Amanvi was 5,312.

== Villages ==
The eleven villages of the sub-prefecture of Amanvi and their population in 2014 are:

1. Adjiéibango (670)
2. Amanvi (1,471)
3. Bracodi (130)
4. Dabilayo (242)
5. Diassampa (163)
6. Fissa (871)
7. Kandenan (663)
8. Lotognio (144)
9. Sogovagne (464)
10. Sogui (225)
11. Tégohuni (269)
