= Tanda, Ivory Coast =

Tanda
- Town, sub-prefecture, and commune
- Location in Ivory Coast
- Coordinates: 7°48′N 3°10′W
- Country: Ivory Coast
- District: Zanzan
- Region: Gontougo
- Department: Tanda

Area
  - Total: 714 km^{2} (276 sq mi)

Population (2021 census)
  - Total: 69,597
  - Density: 97.5/km^{2} (252/sq mi)
  - Town: 27,659
- (2014 census)
- Time zone: UTC+0 (GMT)

Tanda is a town in eastern Ivory Coast. It is a sub-prefecture and the seat of Tanda Department in Gontougo Region, Zanzan District. Tanda is also a commune. In 2021, the population of the sub-prefecture of Tanda was 69,597.

== Villages ==
The 34 villages of the sub-prefecture of Tanda and their population in 2014 are:

1. Abokouma (1,129)
2. Ahibango (414)
3. Amata (349)
4. Assafo (88)
5. Bakoutié-Yao-Fiéni (568)
6. Bokoré (1,585)
7. Brouko (1,060)
8. Béléoulé (699)
9. Dibibango (368)
10. Djani-Yao (749)
11. Fodja (170)
12. Guiendé (1,506)
13. Iguéla (930)
14. Karabegné (371)
15. Kiétan (561)
16. Kongodja (521)
17. Korobo (1,702)
18. Koroko 2 (224)
19. Korokobango (417)
20. Korokofoumassa (204)
21. Kouatoutou (791)
22. Lomo (1,294)
23. Lécocodi (326)
24. Nagafou (1,066)
25. Nao (1,050)
26. Sokouadou (348)
27. Sépé (386)
28. Tanda (27,659)
29. Tangamourou (1,705)
30. Toundiani (1,273)
31. Tèko (492)
32. Téhui (1,197)
33. Yanvo (534)
34. Yaobouo (222)
