= Kouassia-Niaguini =

Kouassia-Niaguini Kouassianiaguéné
- Town and sub-prefecture
- Location in Ivory Coast
- Coordinates: 7°23′N 3°2′W
- Country: Ivory Coast
- District: Zanzan
- Region: Gontougo
- Department: Transua

Population (2014)
  - Total: 16,872
- Time zone: UTC+0 (GMT)

Kouassia-Niaguini (also spelled Kouassianiaguéné) is a town in the far east of Ivory Coast. It is a sub-prefecture of Transua Department in Gontougo Region, Zanzan District.

Kouassia-Nigaguini was a commune until March 2012, when it became one of 1,126 communes nationwide that were abolished.

In 2014, the population of the sub-prefecture of Kouassia-Niaguini was 16,872.

== Villages ==
The thirteen villages of the sub-prefecture of Kouassia-Niaguini and their population in 2014 are:

1. Arrosua (1,983)
2. Assuakô (1,523)
3. Assuatifi (650)
4. Baoulékoffikro (1,468)
5. Dadiassé-Abrikokro (464)
6. Essi-Kouakoukro (224)
7. Kouadio-Dongokro (769)
8. Kouadjo-Kissikro (793)
9. Kouassi-Nianguini (1,738)
10. Kroupikro (627)
11. N'zuassé (2,810)
12. Signahalé (2,047)
13. Yao-Nango (1,776)
