= Kokomian =

Kokomian Kokomia
- Town and sub-prefecture
- Location in Ivory Coast
- Coordinates: 7°16′N 3°3′W
- Country: Ivory Coast
- District: Zanzan
- Region: Gontougo
- Department: Koun-Fao

Population (2014)
  - Total: 10,438
- Time zone: UTC+0 (GMT)

Kokomian (also spelled Kokomia) is a town in the far east of Ivory Coast. It is a sub-prefecture of Koun-Fao Department in Gontougo Region, Zanzan District. Four kilometres southeast of town is a border crossing with Ghana.

Kokomian was a commune until March 2012, when it became one of 1,126 communes nationwide that were abolished.

In 2014, the population of the sub-prefecture of Kokomian was 10,438.

== Villages ==
The eight villages of the sub-prefecture of Kokomian and their population in 2014 are:

1. Bossignamienkro (1,057)
2. Ifo (858)
3. Koffi-Badoukro (2,891)
4. Kokomian (2,195)
5. Petit-Abengourou (964)
6. Sogoyaokro (869)
7. Takikro (1,438)
8. Warèkro (166)
