= Nassian Department =

Coordinates: 8°27′N 3°28′W

Nassian Department Département de Nassian
- Department
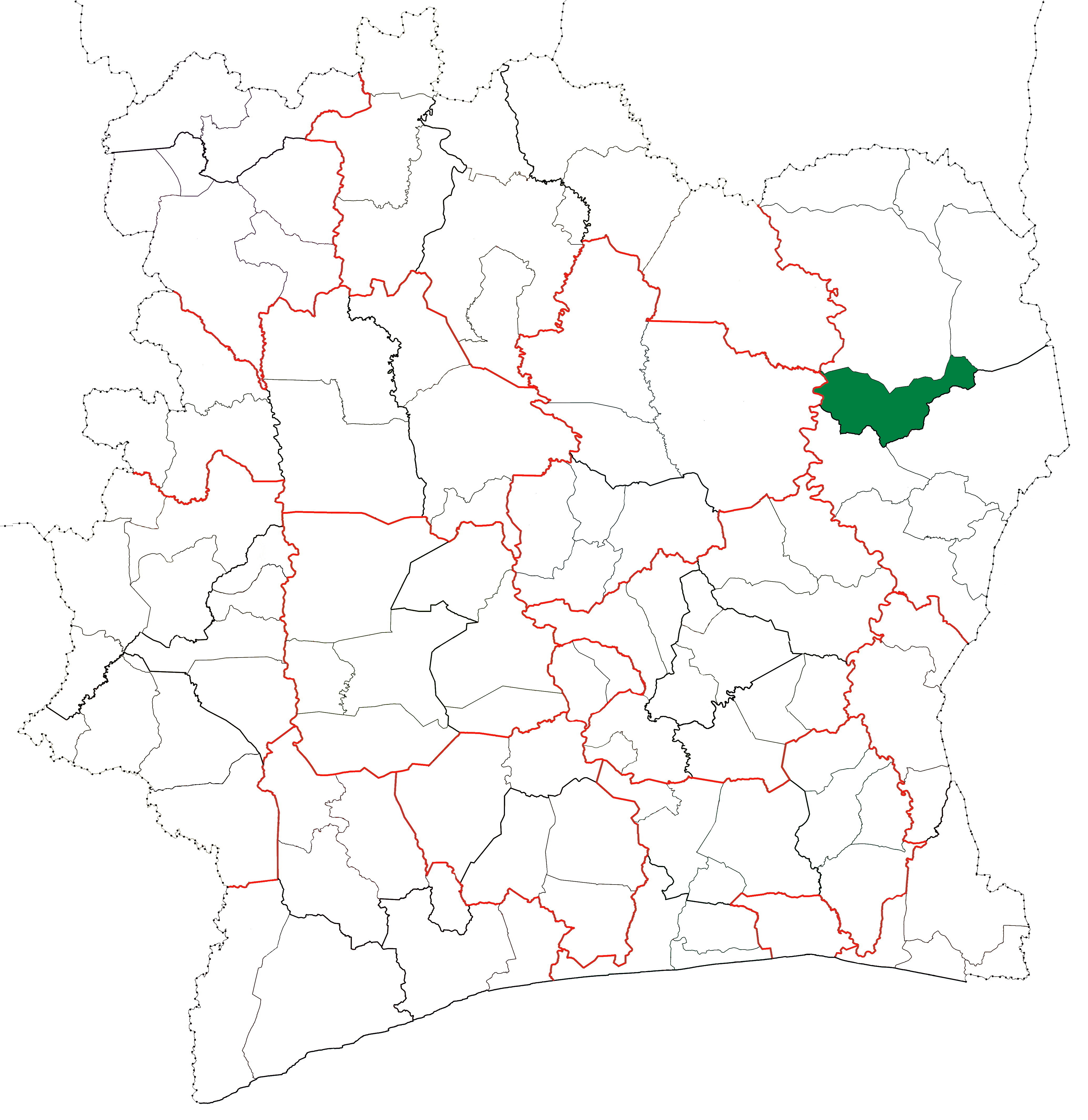
- Location in Ivory Coast. Nassian Department has retained the same boundaries since its creation in 2005.
- Country: Ivory Coast
- District: Zanzan
- Region: Bounkani
- 2005: Established as a second-level subdivision via a division of Bouna Dept
- 2011: Converted to a third-level subdivision
- Departmental seat: Nassian

Government
  - Prefect: Koné Sounan Jacques

Area
  - Total: 2,810 km^{2} (1,080 sq mi)

Population (2021 census)
  - Total: 71,724
  - Density: 25.5/km^{2} (66.1/sq mi)
- Time zone: UTC+0 (GMT)

Nassian Department is a department of Bounkani Region in Zanzan District, Ivory Coast. In 2021, its population was 71,724 and its seat is the settlement of Nassian. The sub-prefectures of the department are Bogofa, Kakpin, Koutouba, Nassian, and Sominassé.

== History ==
Nassian Department was created in 2005 as a second-level subdivision via a split-off from Bouna Department. At its creation, it was part of Zanzan Region.

In 2011, districts were introduced as new first-level subdivisions of Ivory Coast. At the same time, regions were reorganised and became second-level subdivisions, and all departments were converted into third-level subdivisions. At this time, Nassian Department became part of Bounkani Region in Zanzan District.

In 2014, the population of the sub-prefecture of Nassian was 19,971.

== Villages ==
The seventeen villages of the sub-prefecture of Nassian and their population in 2014 are:

1. Angobila (1 046)
2. Anvéyo (314)
3. Bondoyo (1 383)
4. Kalabo (50)
5. Landé (891)
6. Longongara (2 118)
7. Nassian (4 785)
8. Parhadi (2 823)
9. Poum (635)
10. Sindé (364)
11. Toungbo (264)
12. Yaga (259)
13. Bougoulaye (732)
14. Dédi (554)
15. Dépingo (808)
16. Talahini (2 609)
17. Tienguélé (336)
