= Cascades de Karfiguéla =

Waterfalls in Burkina Faso

Cascades de Banfora
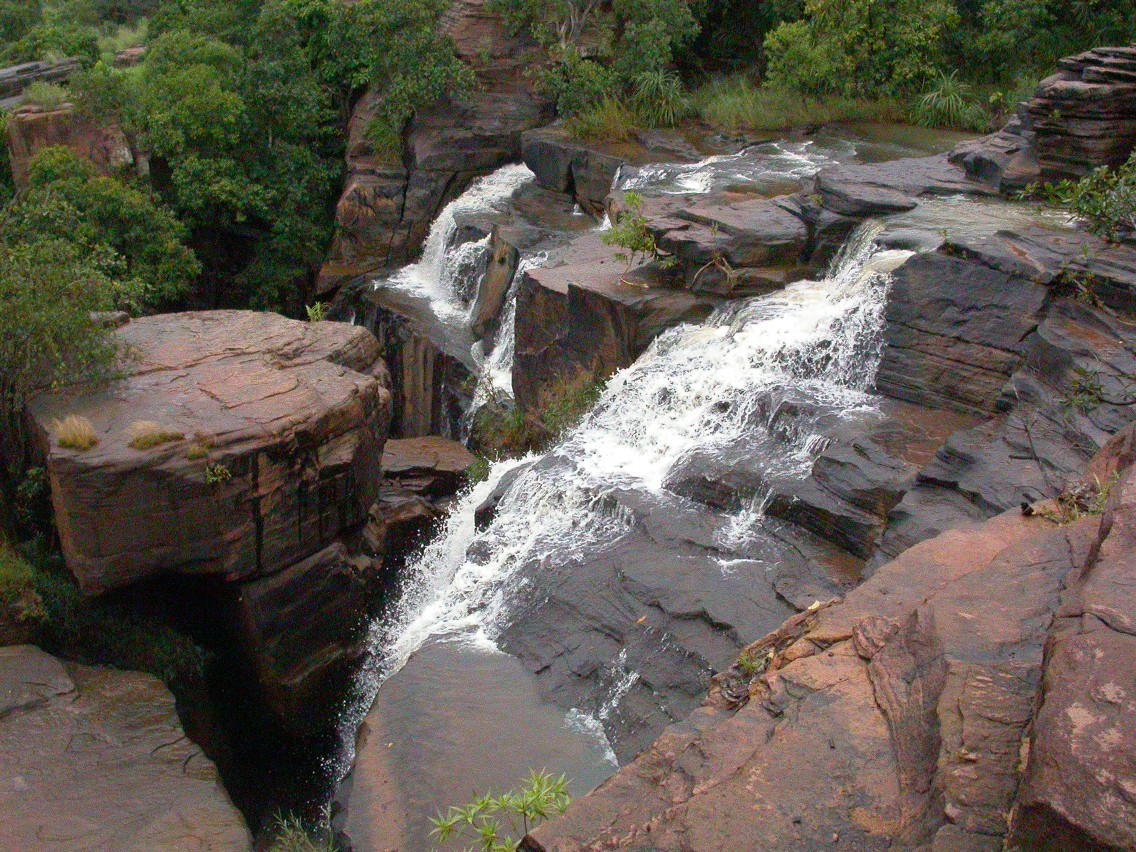
- The Cascades de Karfiguéla
- Interactive map of Cascades de Banfora
- Location: Karfiguéla, Burkina Faso
- Coordinates: 10.722278°N 4.821°W
- Watercourse: Komoé River

The Cascades de Karfiguéla or the Banfora Cascades (also Karfiguela Falls, Tagbaladougou Falls, or Banfora Falls) are a series of waterfalls along the Komoé River in Southwestern Burkina Faso. They are located about 12 km northwest of Banfora and constitute one of the most important tourism sites in Burkina Faso. The Cascades Region gets its name from the waterfalls. The flow of the falls peaks during the rainy season from June to September.
