= Burkina Faso–Ivory Coast border =

International border

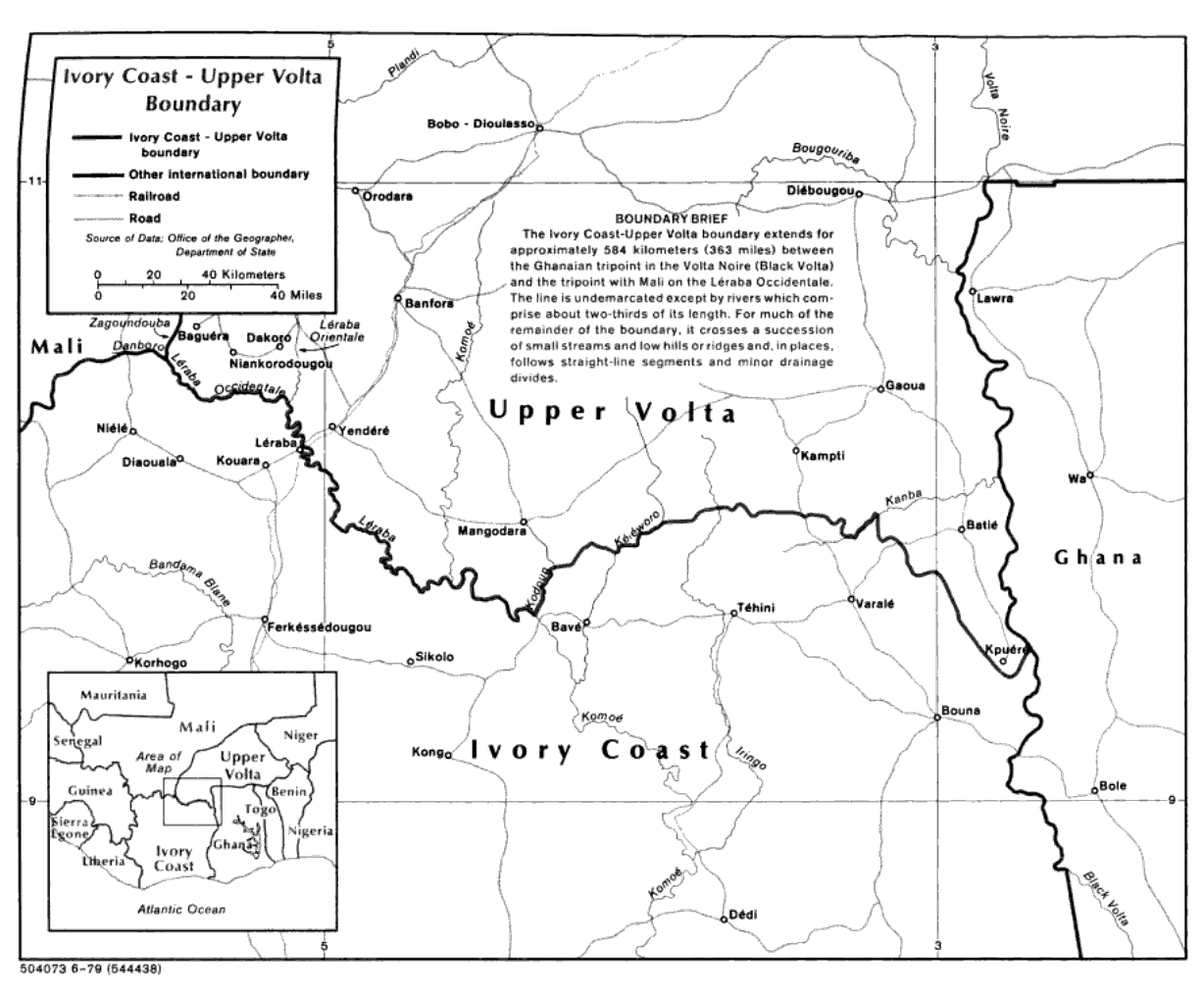
Burkina Faso-Ivory Coast border map

The Burkina Faso–Ivory Coast border is 545 km (or 339 mi) in length and runs from the tripoint with Mali in the west to the tripoint with Ghana in the east.

== Description ==
The border starts in the west at the tripoint with Mali on the Léraba river; the border then follows this river, and then the Kamoe, as they flow south-eastwards. The border then turns eastwards, proceeding via various rivers (such as the Keleworo, Kanba and Koulbi) and irregular overland lines to the tripoint with Ghana in the east on the Black Volta river.

== History ==
Map of Ivory Coast from 1937, during the period of the dissolution of Upper Volta

France had begun signing treaties with chiefs along the modern Ivorian coast in the 1840s, thereby establishing a protectorate which later became the colony of Ivory Coast in 1893. As a result of the Scramble for Africa in the 1880s, France had gained control the upper valley of the Niger River (roughly equivalent to the areas of modern Mali and Niger). France occupied this area in 1900; Mali (then referred to as French Sudan) was originally included, along with modern Niger and Burkina Faso, within the Upper Senegal and Niger colony and (along with Ivory Coast) became a constituent of the federal colony of French West Africa (Afrique occidentale française, abbreviated AOF).

The internal divisions of AOF underwent several changes during its existence; what are now Mali, Niger and Burkina Faso were initially united as Upper Senegal and Niger, with Niger constituting a military territory ruled from Zinder. The Niger military territory was split off in 1911, becoming a separate colony in 1922, and Mali and Upper Volta (Burkina Faso) were constituted as separate colonies in 1919. During the period 1932–47 Upper Volta was abolished and its territory split out between French Sudan, Niger and Ivory Coast, with the latter gaining the bulk of the territory, re-named "Haute Côte d'Ivoire". The precise date the Ivory Coast–Upper Volta boundary was drawn appears to be uncertain – it is thought to have been drawn at the time of the formal institution of Upper Volta in 1919, based upon the rough delimitation of Ivorian territory by France in 1899.

As the movement for decolonisation grew in the post-Second World War era, France gradually granted more political rights and representation for their sub-Saharan African colonies, culminating in the granting of broad internal autonomy to French West Africa in 1958 within the framework of the French Community. Eventually, in 1960, both Ivory Coast and Upper Volta gained independence, and their mutual frontier became an international one between two states.

Since the outbreak of conflict in northern Mali in 2012 Ivory Coast has begun strengthening security at its northern borders in order to prevent any spill-over.

== Settlements near the border ==
=== Burkina Faso ===
- Niangoloko
- Farakorosso
- Ouangolodougou
- Magodara
- Moulepo
- Bousoukoula
- Kampti

=== Ivory Coast ===
- Kaouara
- Ouangolodougou
- Govitan
- Lankio
- Kalamon
- Danoa
- Doropo

== Border crossings ==
The main crossing is located at Doropo (CIV)–Kampti (BFA).

== See also ==
- Burkinabes in Ivory Coast
- Ivorians in Burkina Faso
