= Karfiguéla =

- Village
- Location within Burkina Faso, French West Africa
- Coordinates: 10°42′08″N 4°49′12″W
- Country: Burkina Faso
- Region: Cascades
- Province: Comoé
- Elevation: 303 m (994 ft)

Population (2012)
  - Total: 890
- Time zone: UTC+0 (GMT)
- Area code: +226 209

Karfiguéla is a village in Burkina Faso's Comoé Province. It has around 890 inhabitants and is home to the Cascades de Karfiguéla, a major tourism destination in Burkina Faso. The town is located about 12 km northwest of Banfora, the provincial capital and the farmers who live there mostly harvest sugar cane.
