= Boahia =

- Town and sub-prefecture
- Location in Ivory Coast
- Coordinates: 7°35′N 3°30′W
- Country: Ivory Coast
- District: Zanzan
- Region: Gontougo
- Department: Koun-Fao

Population (2014)
  - Total: 9,182
- Time zone: UTC+0 (GMT)

Boahia is a town in eastern Ivory Coast. It is a sub-prefecture of Koun-Fao Department in Gontougo Region, Zanzan District.

Boahia was a commune until March 2012, when it became one of 1,126 communes nationwide that were abolished. In 2014, the population of the sub-prefecture of Boahia was 9,182.

== Villages ==
The nine villages of the sub-prefecture of Boahia and their population in 2014 are:

1. Abokosso (599)
2. Boahia (3,968)
3. Dabokitira (627)
4. Daboyaokro (533)
5. Doumorossi (1,097)
6. Kodjinan (528)
7. Morsankro (657)
8. N'dakro (517)
9. Yaobilékro (656)
