= Bouna, Ivory Coast =

Bouna Buna
- Town, sub-prefecture, and commune
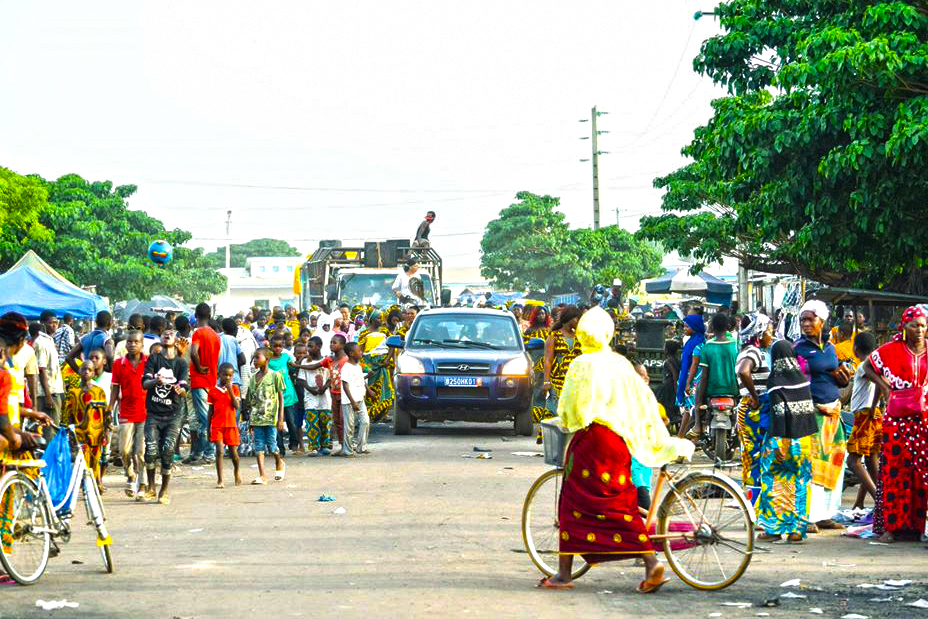
- Bouna Market

- Location in Ivory Coast
- Coordinates: 9°16′N 3°0′W
- Country: Ivory Coast
- District: Zanzan
- Region: Bounkani
- Department: Bouna

Area
  - Total: 2,280 km^{2} (880 sq mi)

Population (2021 census)
  - Total: 94,883
  - Density: 41.6/km^{2} (108/sq mi)
  - Town: 18,755
- (2014 census)
- Time zone: UTC+0 (GMT)

Bouna (also spelled Buna) is a town in north-eastern Ivory Coast. It is a sub-prefecture of and the seat of Bouna Department. It is also the seat of Bounkani Region in Zanzan District and a commune.

Near Bouna is the Comoé National Park and the Ghanaian border. The main town of the Lobi people, Bouna is known for the vernacular architecture of the fortress-style adobe compounds in surrounding villages. The town is served by its own dirt-runway airport. This bush landing strip mainly serves the United Nations. In 2021, the population of the sub-prefecture of Bouna was 94,883.

== History ==
=== Early history ===
At its founding Bouna was a Koulango and Dyula village. In the late 16th century Bouna was conquered by the king named Naa Zokuli who had Dagomba prince Darigu Damda, who married the local chief's daughter. Their son Bounkani founded the royal dynasty of Bouna.

Bouna was a "highly centralized kingdom based on military districts administered by princes" who exploited the local gold deposits. Like Kong, it became a major center of Islamic learning. Bouna was a refuge for the imam of Bighu after the collapse of that city, as well as the Muslim scholars driven out of the Ashanti court in the 1820s.

=== Samori Ture ===
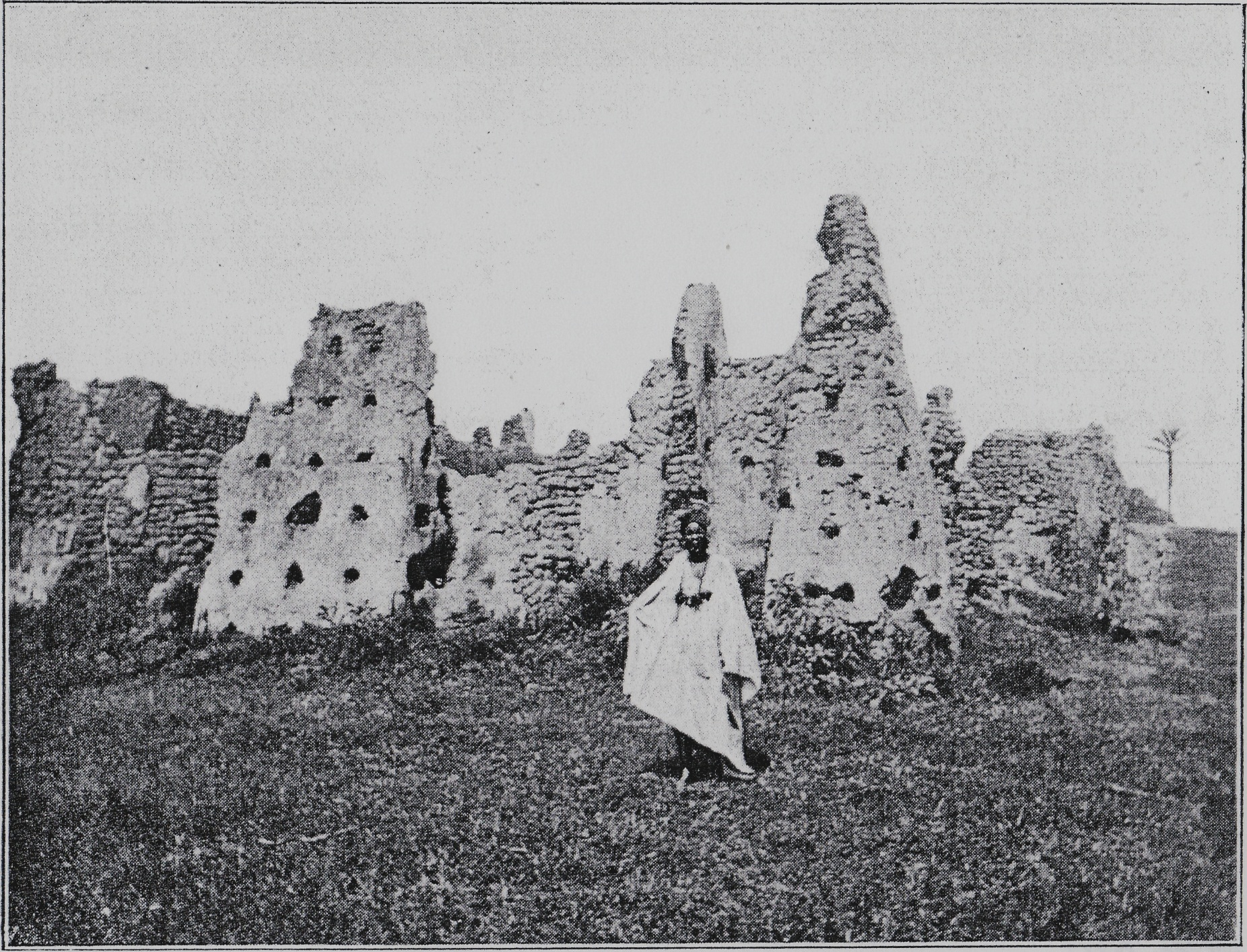
Ruined Mosque outside Bouna

By 1895 the Wassoulou Empire under Samori Ture had pushed east and conquered Kong, and was eyeing Bouna as a link to British-held Gold Coast, a source of firearms. His son Saranken Mori captured the town in December 1896, installing the local Cisse as Imams in place of the Kamara family who had plotted against them.

In April 1897, Governor William Edward Maxwell tried to intimidate Saranken Mori into abandoning Bouna to the British. When this failed, a force of the Southern Nigeria Regiment under Henderson marched on the town but were defeated at Dokita, then later routed and Henderson was captured at Wa.

Knowing this setback would prompt an aggressive British response, the French sent Capt. Paul Braulot, at the head of an armed column, to try to acquire Bouna by negotiation. Saranken Mori initially accepted. But when Braulot arrived, he was killed and his column destroyed outside the city on August 20, 1897, restarting the war between Wassoulou and the French. Ture was defeated and captured the next year.

=== Post-Independence ===
Bouna was one of the main strongholds of the Forces Nouvelles de Côte d'Ivoire, the rebel army of the 2002 attempted coup d'état. The general population of Bouna suffered greatly in the early days of the rebellion.

== Villages ==
The one hundred and twenty four villages of the sub-prefecture of Bouna and their population in 2014 are:

1. Assoum 1 (1 157)
2. Bikounérédouo (148)
3. Bissori-Tchogbolo (238)
4. Bomandouo (248)
5. Bouna (18 755)
6. Bromankoté (460)
7. Délédouo (914)
8. Djémitédouo (335)
9. Gbalamoulédouo (193)
10. Gnaditedouo (105)
11. Titidouo (Teguirdouo) (638)
12. Assiédouo (287)
13. Assoum 2 (315)
14. Bahintédouo (198)
15. Bandouo (47)
16. Bania (644)
17. Béoumpédouo (168)
18. Bibieldouo (264)
19. Bihénandouo (77)
20. Bikohidouo (82)
21. Binodouo (21)
22. Botou (276)
23. Boukodouo (274)
24. Dabilo(Dablo) (123)
25. Dagnamadouo (488)
26. Dakoundouo (173)
27. Danakourdouo (152)
28. Dapidouo (295)
29. Daritéon (201)
30. Dipridouo (215)
31. Djadredouo (186)
32. Djédo (145)
33. Djégbonaudouo (160)
34. Djenkadouo (68)
35. Djinbieltedouo (335)
36. Djindrétéhon (38)
37. Donkpédouo (104)
38. Fanérédouo (117)
39. Fangadouo (136)
40. Filtibdouo (104)
41. Galso (104)
42. Gbadjoudouo (387)
43. Gbodouo (45)
44. Gniembétédouo (395)
45. Gnindiondouo (204)
46. Gompar (508)
47. Goungounkpé (299)
48. Himbié (930)
49. Holiertéon (316)
50. Honsontédouo (231)
51. Kassoptédouo (124)
52. Kerbo 1 (260)
53. Kobétédouo (61)
54. Koflandé (425)
55. Kokpingué (538)
56. Kondidouo (138)
57. Konguidouo (166)
58. Konkoratéon (120)
59. Konkpédouo (459)
60. Kouédouo (757)
61. Kouénéra (793)
62. Koulperdouo (36)
63. Kourbini (493)
64. Lankara (550)
65. Lékparédouo (532)
66. Lokardouo (285)
67. Lorateon (302)
68. Louguilèdouo (183)
69. Louloundouo (226)
70. Mamardouo (63)
71. Mango (963)
72. Massioutéon (323)
73. Méninko (268)
74. Minatéon (238)
75. Naguidouo (782)
76. Nakirdouo (253)
77. Naladouo (74)
78. Namidouo 2 (155)
79. Niandégué (452)
80. Nofildouo (265)
81. Nomidouo (462)
82. Notadouo (234)
83. Ounanfagnondouo (101)
84. Pidibouo (73)
85. Pinodouo (13)
86. Pouan 1 (258)
87. Properdouo (151)
88. Samantou 1 (272)
89. Samantou 2 (154)
90. Sanguinanri (1 020)
91. Sépadouo (198)
92. Sepatédouo (29)
93. Siliétéon (184)
94. Sipridouo (590)
95. Sipritéon 1 (143)
96. Sipritéon 2 (342)
97. Siraodi (1 035)
98. Sitepdouo (103)
99. Sonouhodouo (75)
100. Sotitédouo (464)
101. Sypaldouo (801)
102. Tamé-Koulda (1 198)
103. Tantama (403)
104. Tchabieldouo (167)
105. Tchapertéon (197)
106. Tchatiédouo (238)
107. Tègbè (376)
108. Ténabo (77)
109. Tiéssaba (343)
110. Tohotéhon (26)
111. Topène (163)
112. Vargbo 1 (594)
113. Vargbo 2 (526)
114. Vigoli (126)
115. Vonkoro (2 651)
116. Wadaradouo (189)
117. Wayorodouo (159)
118. Wirédouo (108)
119. Yalo (278)
120. Yeunondouo (93)
121. Yodidouo (234)
122. Yolongo(Nianlongo) (380)
123. Youtourdouo (504)
124. Zazoudouo (297)
