= Komoé River =

River in West Africa

Komoé River Comoé River
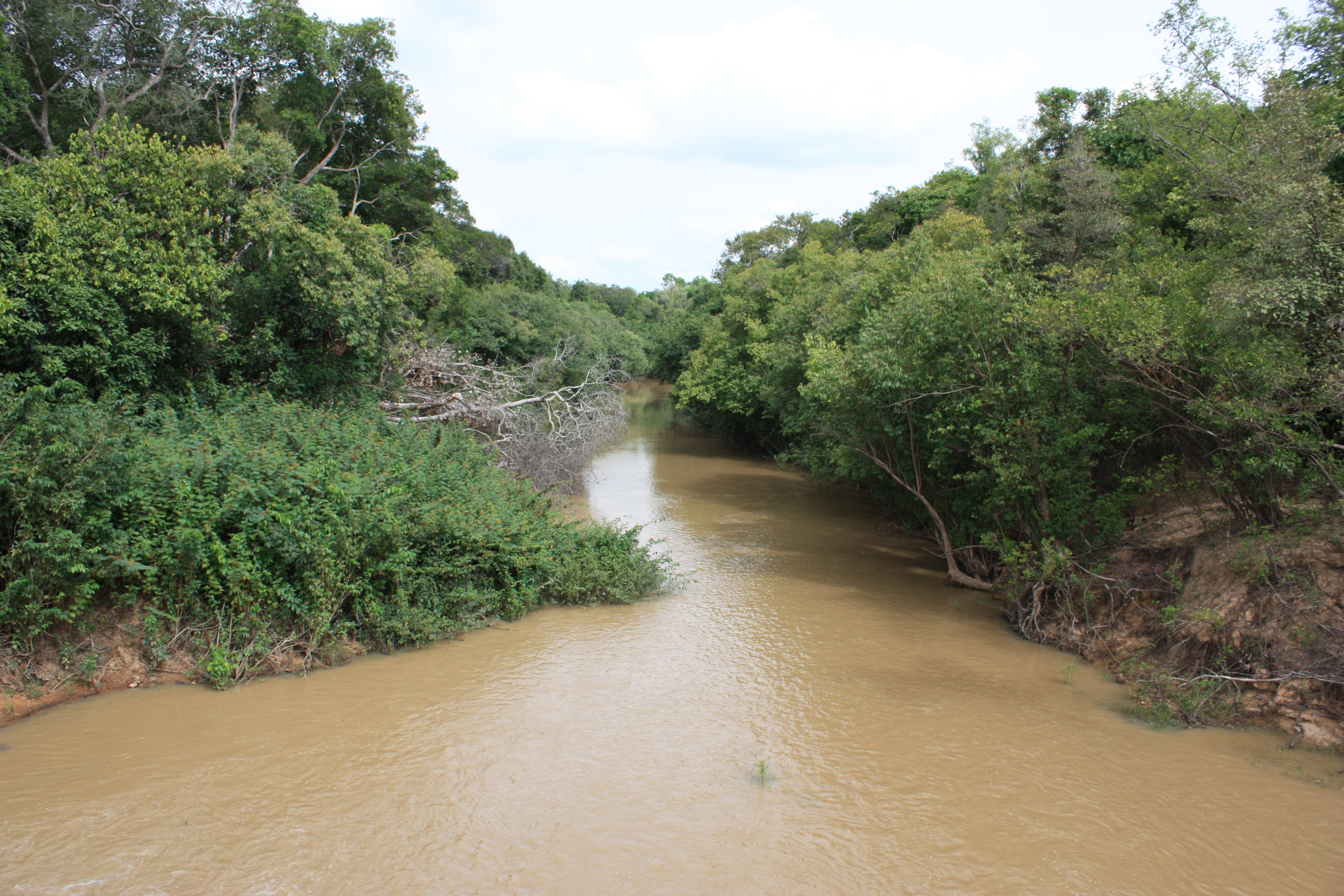
- The Comoé River near Folonzo

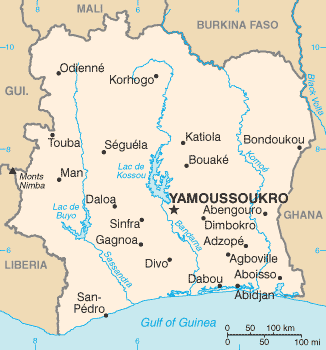
- Map of Côte d'Ivoire showing the Komoé River in the eastern part of the country

Location
- Country: Burkina Faso, Ivory Coast

Physical characteristics
- Source: Sikasso Plateau
  - location: Bobo-Dioulasso Department, Houet Province, Burkina Faso
  - coordinates: 10°58′N 004°30′W
  - elevation: 525 m (1,722 ft)
- Mouth: Grand-Bassam
  - location: Gulf of Guinea, Atlantic Ocean, Ivory Coast
  - coordinates: 5°11′30″N 003°43′20″W
  - elevation: 0 m (0 ft)
- Length: 759 km (472 mi)

Basin features
- Tributaries
  - right: Léraba River

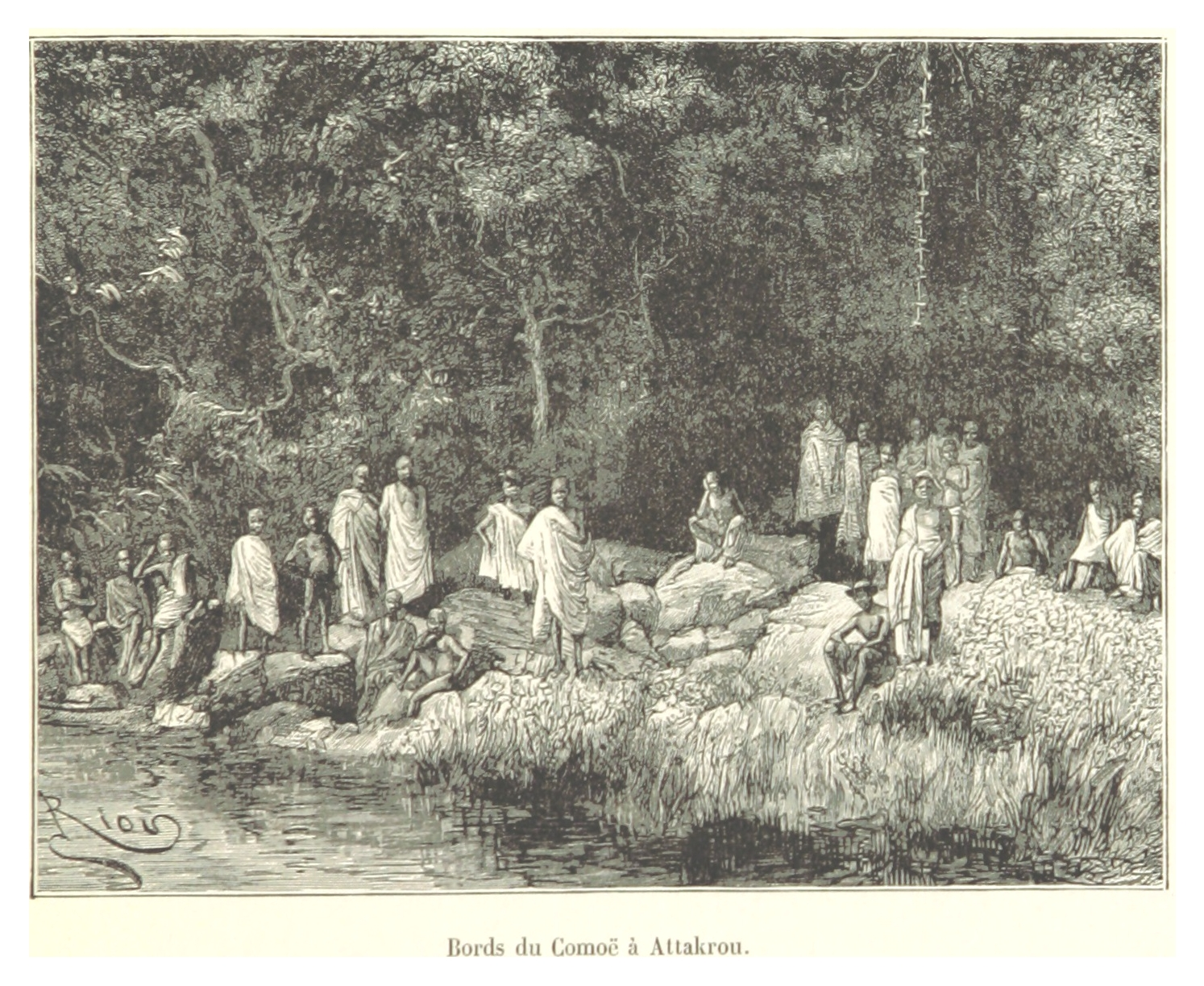
Along the Komoé River, 1892

The Komoé River or Comoé River is a river in West Africa. The river originates on the Sikasso Plateau of Burkina Faso, flows through the Cascades de Karfiguéla, forms a short section of the border between Burkina Faso and Ivory Coast before entering Ivory Coast. It serves as the major drainage for the northeastern portion of that country before emptying into the Atlantic. The banks of the Komoé are shaded by riparian forests along most of its length, providing an important habitat for wildlife and a source of agricultural water. Where reliable floodplains form in Ivory Coast, rice may be grown. A portion of the river in northern Ivory Coast is the source of the vegetative richness that earned that area a UNESCO World Heritage Site designation, Comoé National Park.

== Course ==
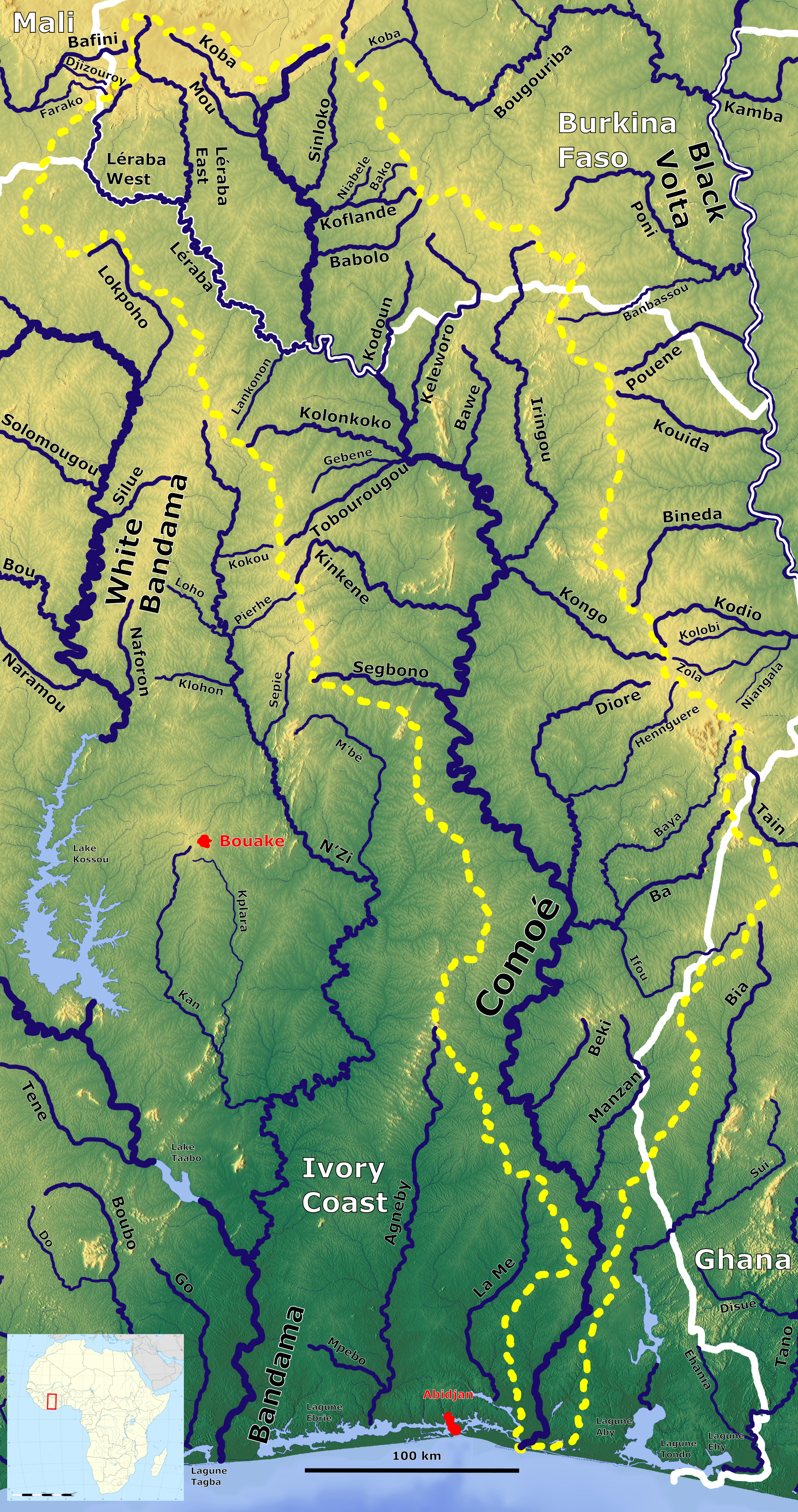
Course of Komoé River

The Komoé River is approximately 759 km long. It rises on the Sikasso Plateau and in the Sindou Hills flowing south over several cataracts with several falls including the "Chutes de la Komoé" and Karifiguela Falls. Upstream of the Karifiguela Falls it is known locally as the Koba River. At 09°42′11″N 004°35′10″W it is joined from the right (west) by the Léraba River, whereafter it flows southeast and forms the border between Burkina Faso and Ivory Coast for some 60 kilometres (37 mi), before it enters Ivory Coast four kilometres southwest of the village of Balanfodougou.

In Ivory Coast, it continues southeast, past the Comoé National Park, forming the border between its Zanzan District and Savanes District. At 09°10′26″N 003°53′33″W it turns south flowing through eastern Ivory Coast and emptying into the far eastern end of the Ébrié Lagoon complex and ultimately the Gulf of Guinea near the port of Grand-Bassam.

== Hydrology and Seasonal Variation ==
The river’s flow is strongly seasonal, with high discharge during the rainy season and reduced flow during dry months.

This seasonal pattern contributes to periodic flooding of wetlands and floodplain zones along its lower course.

== Ecology and Biodiversity ==
The Komoe River basin contains savannah, woodland, and tropical forest ecosystems that support rich biodiversity.

Its floodplain and surrounding regions include protected areas such as Comoé National Park, a UNESCO World Heritage Site known for its ecological diversity.

== Human and Economic Importance ==
The river supports agriculture including cocoa, coffee, bananas, and pineapple cultivation in Côte d’Ivoire’s fertile regions.

It is also important for fishing, transportation (in navigable sections), and rural livelihoods along its basin.

=== Tributaries ===
- Léraba River at 09°42′11″N 004°35′10″W a right tributary from the west,
- Boin River at 09°12′38″N 003°57′53″W a left tributary from the north in Comoé National Park.
