= Zanzan Region =

Former region of Ivory Coast

Zanzan Region Région du Zanzan
- Defunct region of Ivory Coast
- 1997–2011
- Location of Zanzan Region in Ivory Coast
- Capital: Bondoukou
- Area
- 38,251 km^{2} (14,769 sq mi)
- History
  - Established as a first-level subdivision: 1997
  - Disestablished: 2011
- Today part of: Zanzan District

Zanzan Region is a defunct region of Ivory Coast. From 1997 to 2011, it was a first-level subdivision region. The region's capital was Bondoukou and its area was 38,251 km^{2}. Since 2011, the area formerly encompassed by the region is co-extensive with Zanzan District.

== Administrative divisions ==
At the time of its dissolution, Zanzan Region was divided into seven departments: Bondoukou, Bouna, Koun-Fao, Nassian, Sandégué, Tanda, and Transua.

== Abolition ==
Zanzan Region was abolished as part of the 2011 administrative reorganisation of the subdivisions of Ivory Coast. The area formerly encompassed by the region is now the same territory as Zanzan District.
