= Burkinabes in Ivory Coast =

Burkinabè in Ivory Coast
- (Burkina Faso) (Ivory Coast)

Total population
- 4,045,594 (2021 census)

Regions with significant populations
- Abidjan, Bouaké, rural cocoa-producing regions (e.g. Bas-Sassandra Region, Sassandra-Marahoué District, Montagnes District)

Languages
- French (African French), Mooré, Dioula and other languages of Burkina Faso, as well as Baoulé and other Ivorian languages

Religion
- Predominantly Islam and Christianity; also traditional beliefs

Burkinabés in Ivory Coast (in French: Burkinabè en Côte d’Ivoire) are residents of Ivory Coast who were born in Burkina Faso or are of Burkinabé descent, meaning that one or both of their parents hold Burkinabé nationality. They constitute the largest Burkinabé diaspora abroad, reflecting long-standing migration driven by geographic proximity, shared linguistic and cultural ties, and labor migration, particularly in agriculture. The two countries share a land border of approximately 545 kilometres (339 mi), which has historically facilitated cross-border mobility, seasonal migration, and settlement between neighboring communities.

The Ivorian 2021 general population and housing census found that there were over 4 million residents of Burkinabé background in the country. Burkinabés by far represent the largest foreign national group in Ivory Coast.

== History ==
=== Precolonial and French colonial period ===
Migration between Burkina Faso and Ivory Coast predates independence and is partly rooted in precolonial mobility within West Africa. Before the establishment of colonial borders, populations moved seasonally for agriculture, trade, and pastoral activities, often within shared cultural zones. Communities such as the Mossi, Sénoufo, Lobi, Bobo, Dioula (Dyula), and Gourmantché lived in territories that later became divided between the two states, facilitating cross-border migration through kinship networks, commercial routes, and circular labor mobility. These shared linguistic and cultural ties contributed to early settlement patterns in northern Ivory Coast and later in southern agricultural regions, where migrants frequently relocated to areas inhabited by related populations. Scholars note that such transborder ethnic continuities shaped migration systems in the Voltaic–Ivorian region prior to formal colonial labor recruitment.

These movements intensified during the French colonial period, when both territories formed part of French West Africa. The area corresponding to present-day Burkina Faso was administered within Upper Senegal and Niger before being constituted as the colony of Upper Volta (Haute-Volta) in 1919. French authorities regarded Upper Volta as a major labor reservoir for neighboring colonies, particularly Côte d’Ivoire, where workers were recruited, and in some cases coerced, for cocoa and coffee plantations, railway construction, and infrastructure projects. Migration increased further after 1932, when Upper Volta was dissolved and its territory divided among Côte d’Ivoire, French Sudan, and the Colony of Niger, placing large populations directly under Ivorian administration and encouraging relocation to the forest zone. Colonial policies thus transformed earlier circular mobility into large-scale labor migration, linking Voltaic regions to plantation economies in southern Ivory Coast.

=== Independence and late 20th century ===
After the gradual abolition of forced labor in the 1940s, migration increasingly became voluntary but continued along established routes. These routes, shaped during the colonial period, reflected earlier systems of coerced and semi-coerced labor mobility that linked the Sahelian regions with the expanding plantation economies of Ivory Coast. Following the independence of both countries in 1960 (the Republic of Upper Volta on 5 August 1960 and the Independence of Ivory Coast on 7 August 1960), cross-border movement persisted within regional labor markets, particularly during the Ivorian economic expansion driven by cocoa and coffee production. These postcolonial migration flows, built upon precolonial mobility and colonial labor systems, consolidated long-term Burkinabé communities throughout Ivory Coast, especially in agricultural zones and urban centers, forming the demographic basis of the contemporary Burkinabé diaspora in the country.

=== 21st century ===
In the 21st century, migration between Burkina Faso and Ivory Coast has remained one of the largest migration corridors in West Africa, shaped by economic disparities, agricultural labor demand, and established migrant networks. Recent studies indicate that the majority of Burkinabè migrants continue to move to neighboring countries, with Ivory Coast accounting for over 60 percent of Burkina Faso’s emigrants in 2019. Migration remains largely oriented toward agricultural employment, particularly in cocoa-producing regions, while circular migration and return migration continue to characterize the corridor. At the same time, political crises in Ivory Coast during the late 1990s and early 2000s, as well as debates over citizenship and land rights, prompted periods of return migration and reinforced the precarious legal status of some Burkinabé migrants and their descendants. Despite these disruptions, the long-established migration system persists, supported by regional free movement, family networks, and economic interdependence between the two countries.

In November 2025, Côte d’Ivoire officially granted refugee status to more than 70,000 asylum seekers, including approximately 69,000 Burkinabè and 1,500 Malians, under an interministerial decree adopted earlier in July 2025. The decision, reported by humanitarian sources and the UNHCR, marked a significant shift in the country’s approach to long-standing migrant populations fleeing insecurity in the Sahel region and formalised their legal protection status in Côte d’Ivoire.
