= Farakorosso =

Farakorosso Fara Forosso
- Location in Burkina Faso
- Coordinates: 9°47′59″N 4°20′10″W
- Country: Burkina Faso
- Region: Cascades Region
- Province: Comoé Province
- Department: Mangodara Department

Population (2019)
  - Total: 2,814

Farakorosso is a town in the Mangodara Department of Comoé Province in south-western Burkina Faso, on the border with Ivory Coast.

Population
Year	Pop.	±%
1985	1,392	—
2006	3,088	+121.8%
2019	2,814	−8.9%
