= Transua Department =

Coordinates: 7°33′N 3°1′W

Transua Department Département de Transua
- Department
- Location in Gonougo Region (brighter green) and Ivory Coast. Transua Department has retained the same boundaries since its creation in 2008.
- Country: Ivory Coast
- Region: Gontougo
- 2008: Established as a second-level subdivision via a division of Tanda Dept
- 2011: Converted to a third-level subdivision
- 2014: Converted back to a second-level subdivision
- Departmental seat: Transua

Government
  - Prefect: Adja Kio Gossan

Area
  - Total: 1,130 km^{2} (440 sq mi)

Population (2021 census)
  - Total: 112,842
  - Density: 99.9/km^{2} (259/sq mi)
- Time zone: UTC+0 (GMT)

Transua Department is a department of Gontougo Region in Zanzan District, Ivory Coast. In 2021, its population was 112,842 and its seat is the settlement of Transua. The sub-prefectures of the department are Assuéfry, Kouassia-Niaguini, and Transua.

== History ==
Transua Department was created in 2008 as a second-level subdivision via a split-off from Tanda Department. At its creation, it was part of Zanzan Region.

In 2011, districts were introduced as new first-level subdivisions of Ivory Coast. At the same time, regions were reorganised and became second-level subdivisions and all departments were converted into third-level subdivisions. At this time, Transua Department became part of Gontougo Region in Zanzan District.
