= Koun-Fao =

- Town, sub-prefecture, and commune
- Location in Ivory Coast
- Coordinates: 7°29′N 3°15′W
- Country: Ivory Coast
- District: Zanzan
- Region: Gontougo
- Department: Koun-Fao

Population (2014)
  - Total: 31,982
- Time zone: UTC+0 (GMT)

Koun-Fao is a town in eastern Ivory Coast. It is a sub-prefecture of and the seat of Koun-Fao Department in Gontougo Region, Zanzan District. Koun-Fao is also a commune.

In 2014, the population of the sub-prefecture of Koun-Fao was 31,982.

== Villages ==
The twenty nine villages of the sub-prefecture of Koun-Fao and their population in 2014 are:

1. Dodoassué (310)
2. Koria (2 319)
3. Kouakoukrakro (1 593)
4. Koun-Abronso (1 121)
5. Koun-Adégoun (327)
6. Koun-Ahounzi (561)
7. Koun-Fao (5 488)
8. Même (928)
9. N'gorato (1 062)
10. Abokro-Damé (1 005)
11. Adoukro (1 359)
12. Akrassikro (265)
13. Anokikro (1 045)
14. Assindi (2 931)
15. Brayé (664)
16. Brindoukro (124)
17. Djatokro (341)
18. Dokanou (1 070)
19. Kangakro (544)
20. Kotogwanda (1 656)
21. Ouatté (2 457)
22. Petit- Abidjan (610)
23. Tanokoffikro (352)
24. Tienkouassikro (184)
25. Worokro (331)
26. Yabrasso (1 522)
27. Yao Badoukro (249)
28. Yébouakro (611)
29. Yomankro (953)
