= Kinetta Camera =

The Kinetta is a film scanner, capable of scanning various film formats at various resolutions, which evolved from an earlier digital camera project.
