= Bouna Department =

Coordinates: 9°16′N 3°0′W

Bouna Department Département de Bouna
- Department
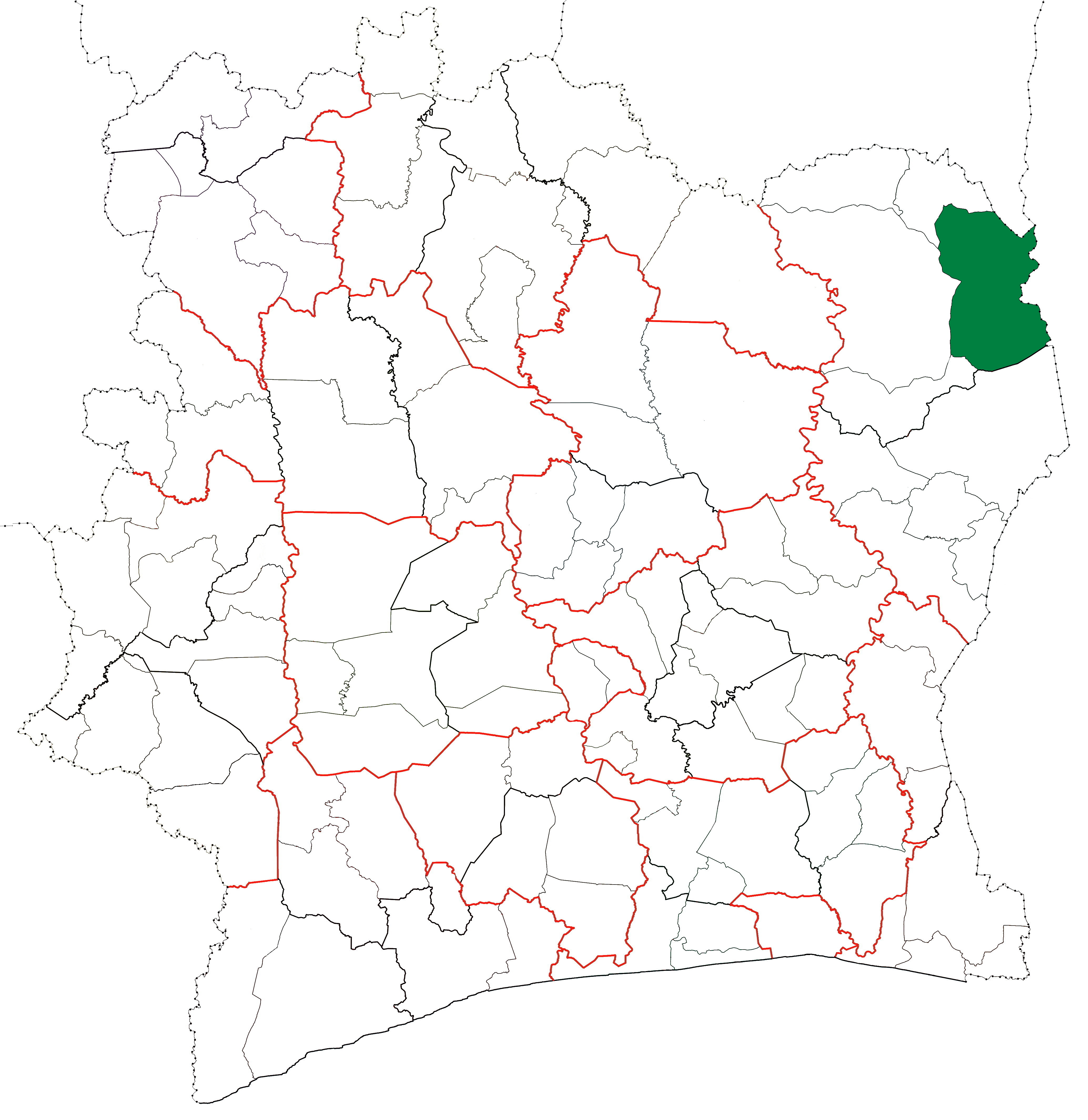
- Location in Ivory Coast. Bouna Department has had these boundaries since 2011.
- Country: Ivory Coast
- District: Zanzan
- Region: Bounkani
- 1974: Established as a first-level subdivision via a division of Bondoukou Dept
- 1997: Converted to a second-level subdivision
- 2005: Divided to create Nassian Dept
- 2011: Converted to a third-level subdivision
- 2011: Divided to create Doropo and Téhini Depts; portion in Comoé Natl Park removed from all departments
- Departmental seat: Bouna

Government
  - Prefect: Tuo Fozié

Area
  - Total: 5,330 km^{2} (2,060 sq mi)

Population (2021 census)
  - Total: 178,081
  - Density: 33.4/km^{2} (86.5/sq mi)
- Time zone: UTC+0 (GMT)

Bouna Department is a department of Bounkani Region in Zanzan District, Ivory Coast. In 2021, its population was 178,081 and its seat is the settlement of Bouna. The sub-prefectures of the department are Bouko, Bouna, Ondéfidouo, and Youndouo.

== History ==
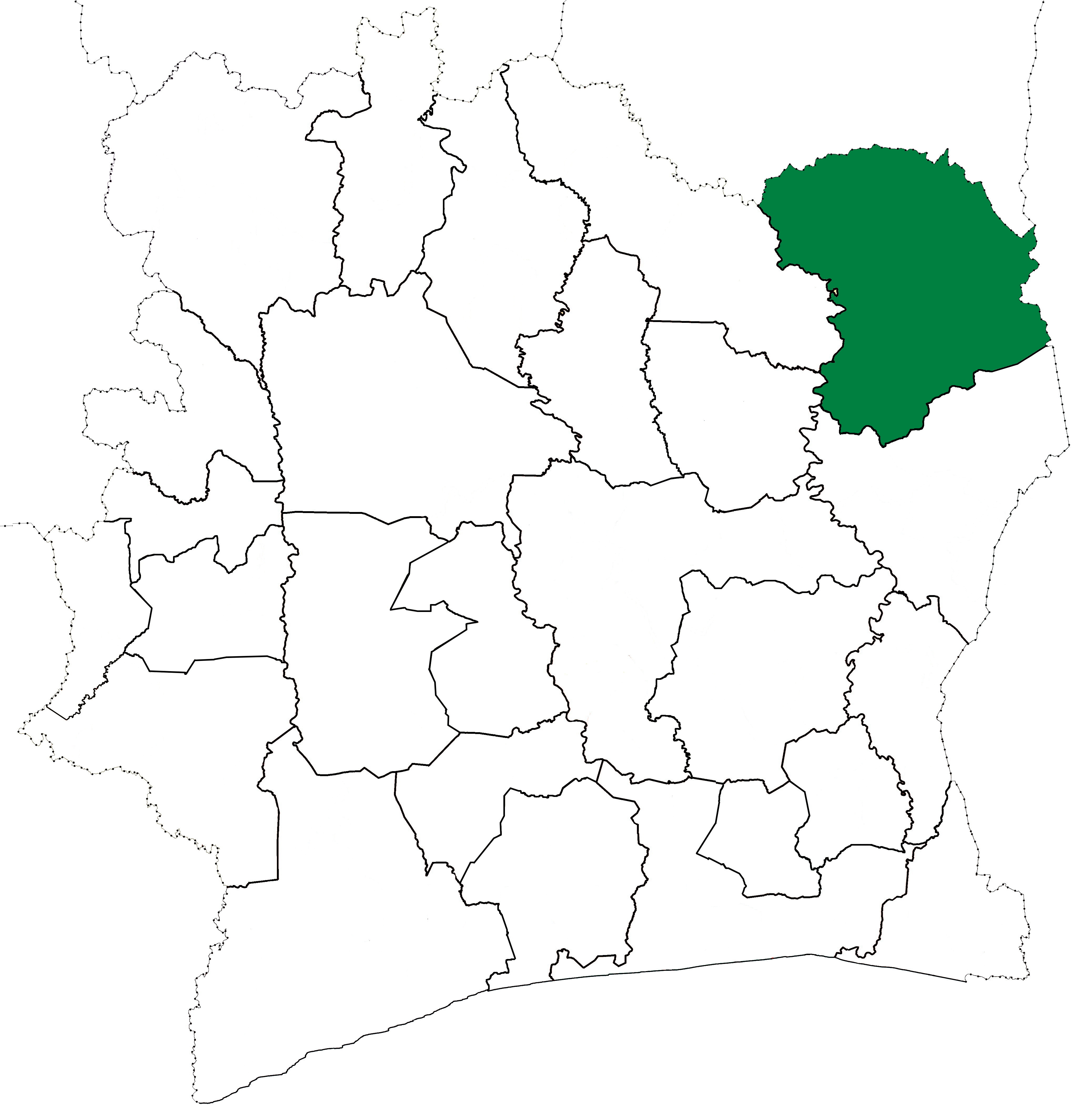
Bouna Department upon its creation in 1974. It kept these boundaries until 2005, but other subdivision boundary changes began to be made in 1980.

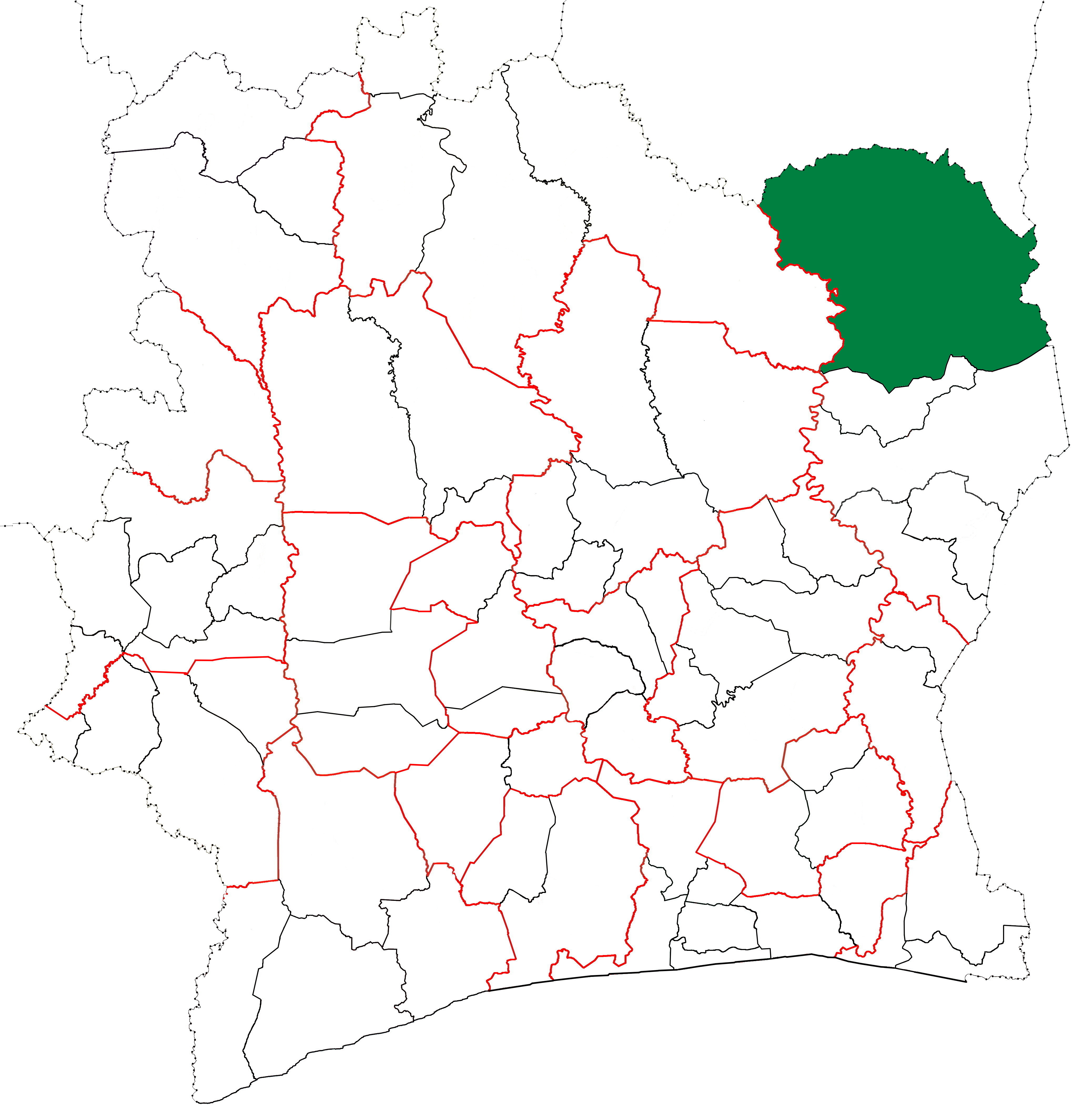
Bouna Department from 2005 to 2011. (Other subdivision boundaries began to change in 2008.)

Bouna Department was created in 1974 as a split-off from Bondoukou Department. Using current boundaries as a reference, from 1974 to 2005 the department occupied the territory of Bounkani Region.

In 1997, regions were introduced as new first-level subdivisions of Ivory Coast; as a result, all departments were converted into second-level subdivisions. Bouna Department was included in Zanzan Region.

In 2005, Bouna Department was divided in order to create Nassian Department.

In 2011, districts were introduced as new first-level subdivisions of Ivory Coast. At the same time, regions were reorganised and became second-level subdivisions and all departments were converted into third-level subdivisions. At this time, Bouna Department became part of Bounkani Region in Zanzan District. At the same time, Bouna Department was divided into four parts to create Doropo and Téhini Departments. The fourth portion consists of a large section of Comoé National Park that was removed from any department.
