= Téhini Department =

Coordinates: 9°36′N 3°40′W

Téhini Department Département de Téhini
- Department
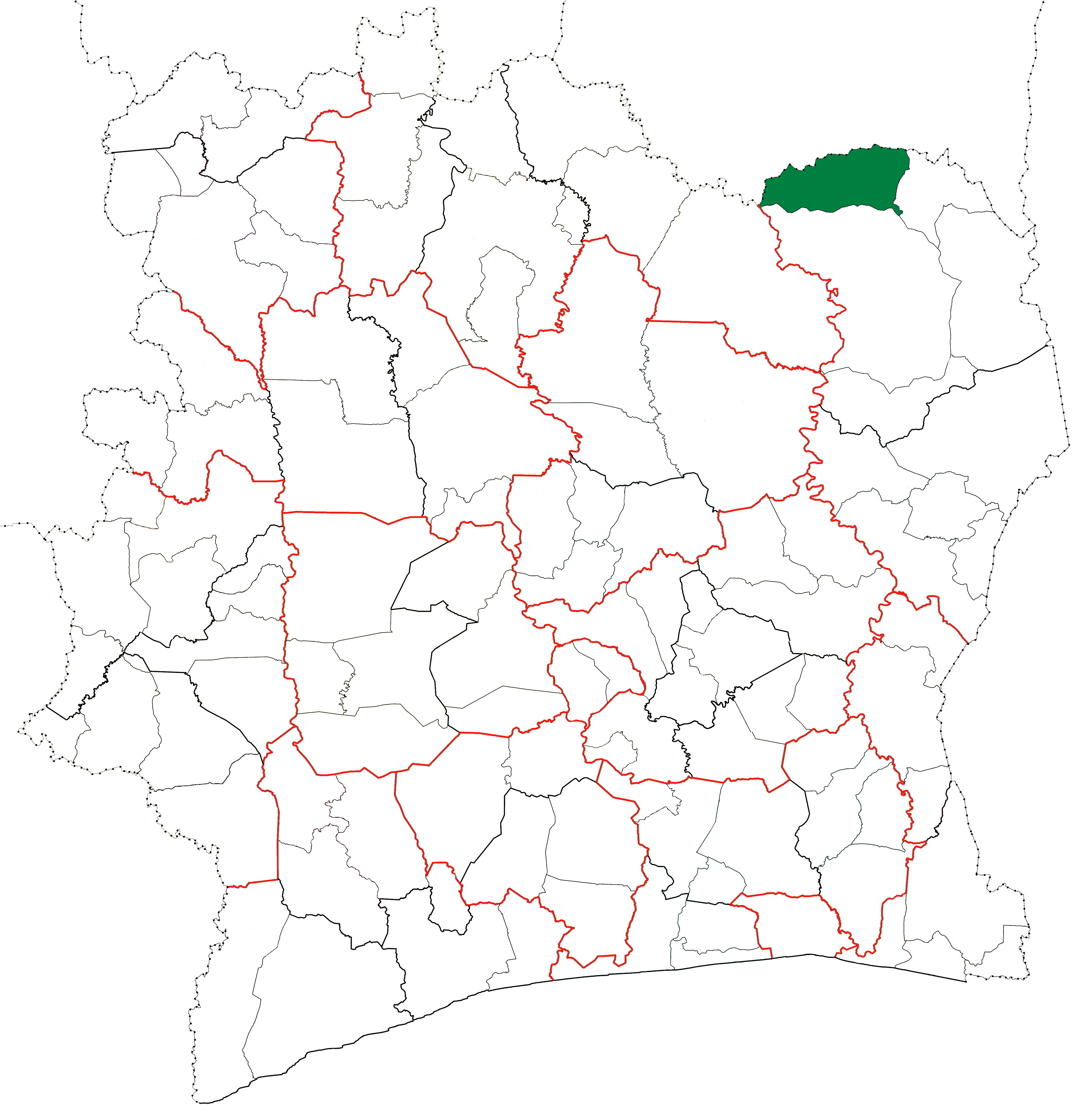
- Location in Ivory Coast. Téhini Department has retained the same boundaries since its creation in 2011.
- Country: Ivory Coast
- District: Zanzan
- Region: Bounkani
- 2011: Established via a division of Bouna Dept
- Departmental seat: Téhini

Government
  - Prefect: Amani Tiémoko

Area
  - Total: 2,850 km^{2} (1,100 sq mi)

Population (2021 census)
  - Total: 83,846
  - Density: 29.4/km^{2} (76.2/sq mi)
- Time zone: UTC+0 (GMT)

Téhini Department is a department of Bounkani Region in Zanzan District, Ivory Coast. In 2021, its population was 83,846 and its seat is the settlement of Téhini. The sub-prefectures of the department are Gogo, Téhini, and Tougbo.

== History ==
Téhini Department was created in 2011 as part of the restructuring of the subdivisions of Ivory Coast, when departments were converted from the second-level administrative subdivisions of the country to the third-level subdivisions. It and Doropo Department were created by splitting Bouna Department into three departments and a fourth area in Comoé National Park that is not governed by a department.
