= Tanda Department =

Coordinates: 7°48′N 3°10′W

Tanda Department Département de Tanda
- Department
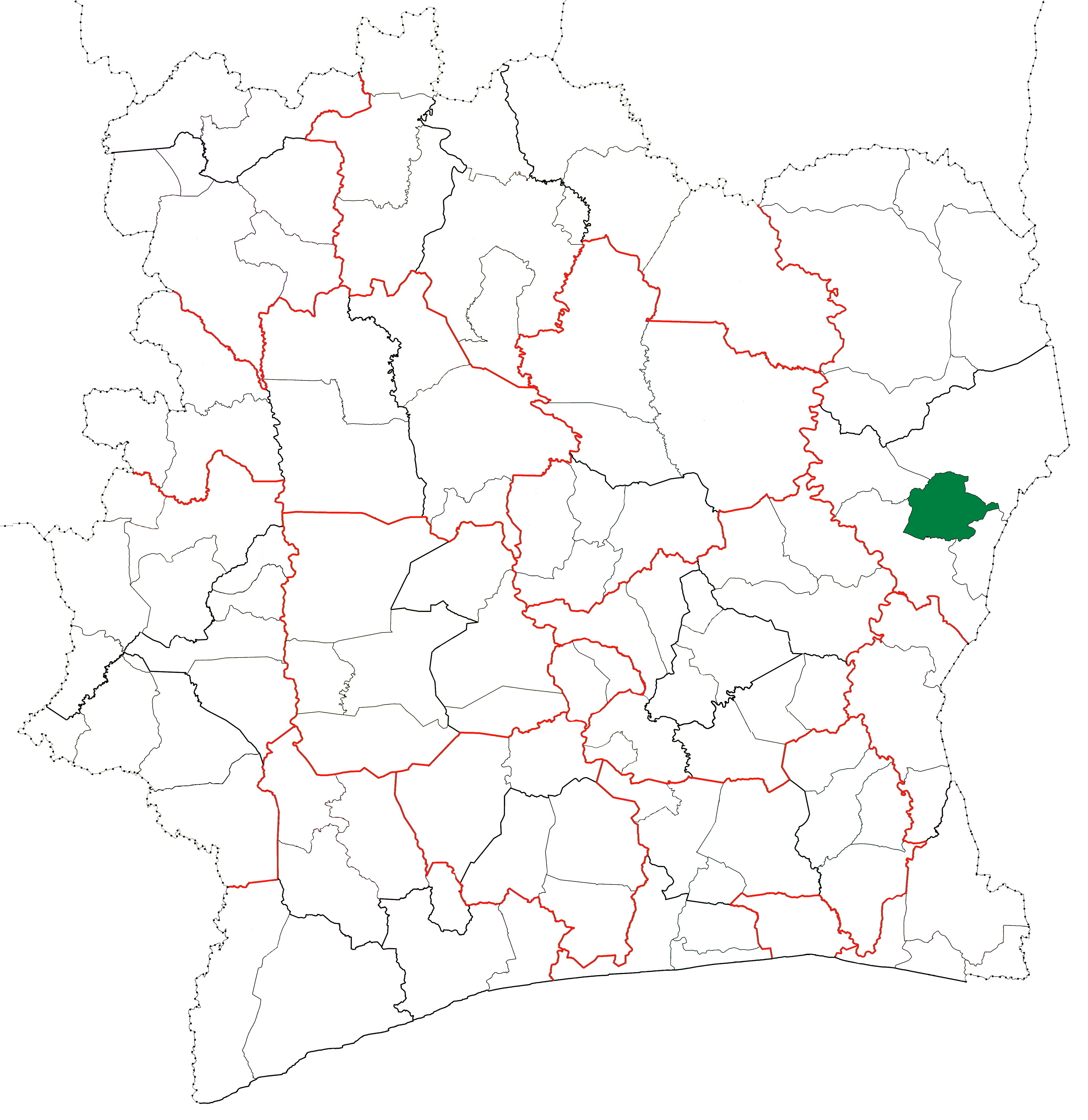
- Location in Ivory Coast. Tanda Department has had these boundaries since 2009.
- Country: Ivory Coast
- District: Zanzan
- Region: Gontougo
- 1988: Established as a first-level subdivision via a division of Bondoukou Dept
- 1997: Converted to a second-level subdivision
- 2005: Divided to create Koun-Fao Dept
- 2009: Divided to create Transua Dept
- 2011: Converted to a third-level subdivision
- Departmental seat: Tanda

Government
  - Prefect: Andjou Koua

Area
  - Total: 1,670 km^{2} (640 sq mi)

Population (2021 census)
  - Total: 113,523
  - Density: 68.0/km^{2} (176/sq mi)
- Time zone: UTC+0 (GMT)

Tanda Department is a department of Gontougo Region in Zanzan District, Ivory Coast. In 2021, its population was 113,523 and its seat is the settlement of Tanda. The sub-prefectures of the department are Amanvi, Diamba, Tanda, and Tchèdio.

== History ==
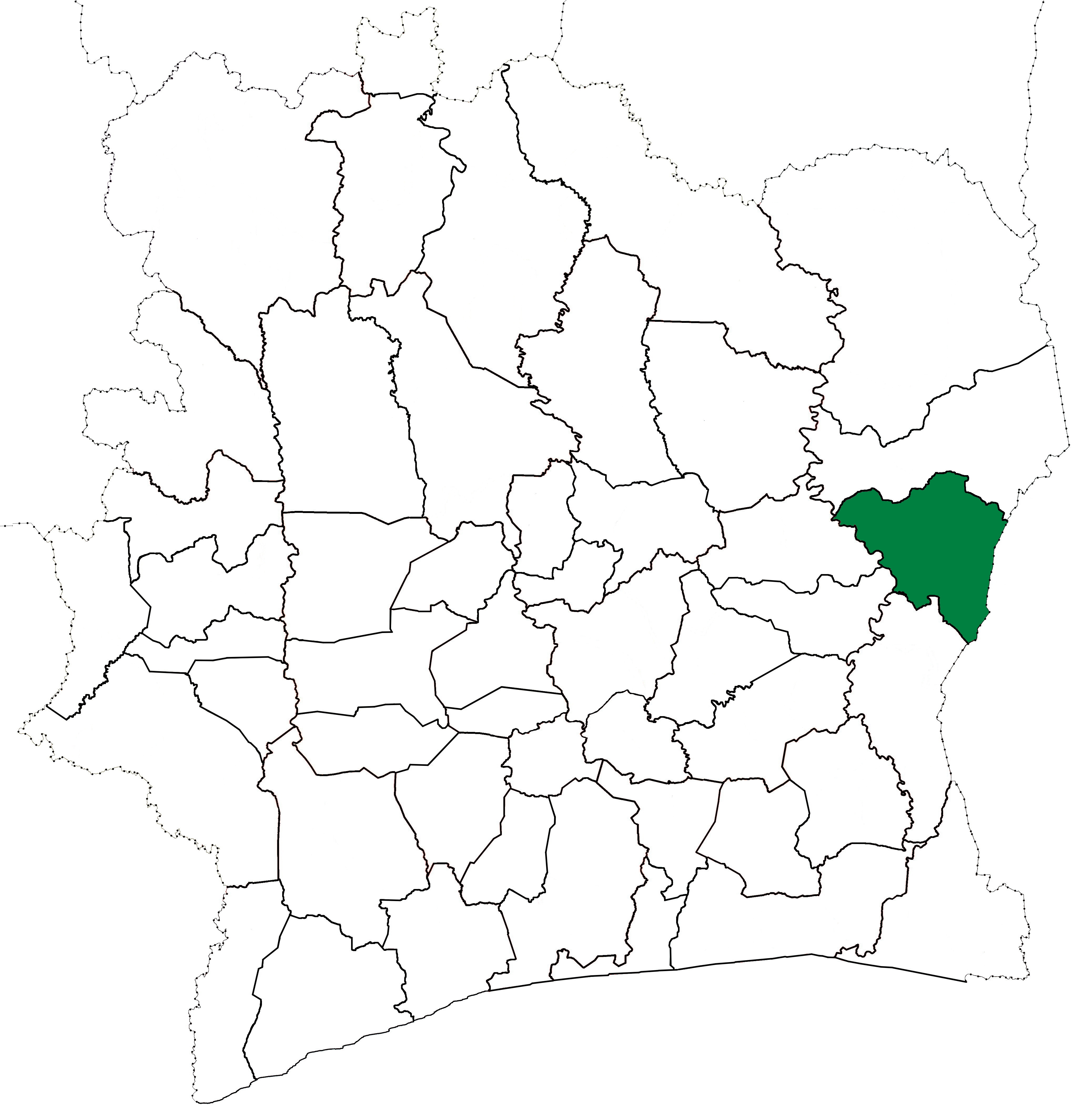
Tanda Department upon its creation in 1988. It kept these boundaries until 2005, but other subdivision boundary changes began to be made in 1995.

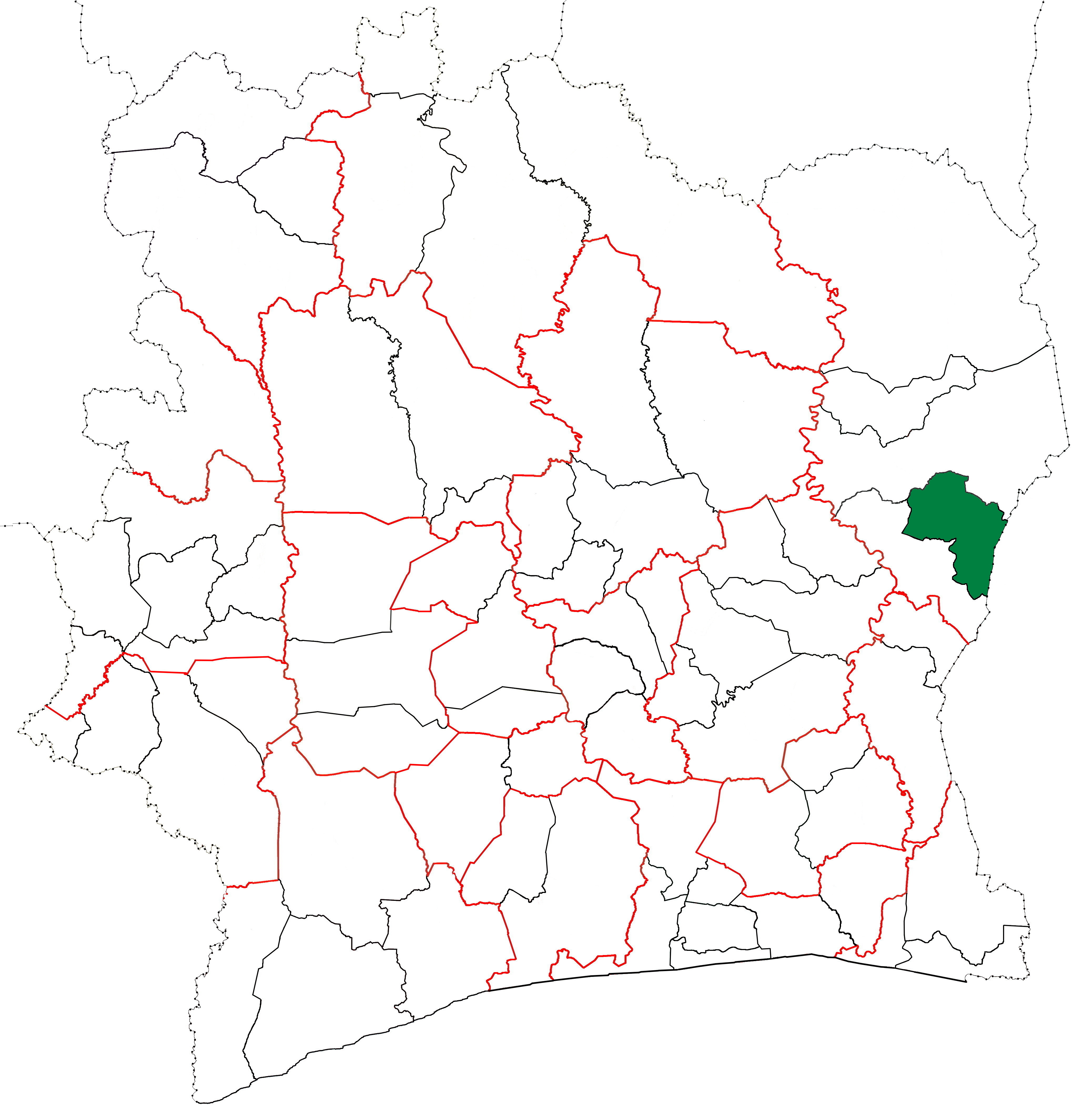
Tanda Department from 2005 to 2009. (Other subdivision boundaries began to change in 2008.)

Tanda Department was created in 1988 as a first-level subdivision via a split-off from Bondoukou Department.

In 1997, regions were introduced as new first-level subdivisions of Ivory Coast; as a result, all departments were converted into second-level subdivisions. Tanda Department was included in Zanzan Region.

In 2005, Tanda Department was divided with the split-off creation of Koun-Fao Department. Tanda Department was divided again in 2009 with the creation of Transua Department.

In 2011, districts were introduced as new first-level subdivisions of Ivory Coast. At the same time, regions were reorganised and became second-level subdivisions and all departments were converted into third-level subdivisions. At this time, Tanda Department became part of Gontougo Region in Zanzan District.
