= Kouassi-Datékro =

- Town, sub-prefecture, and commune
- Location in Ivory Coast
- Coordinates: 7°49′N 3°32′W
- Country: Ivory Coast
- District: Zanzan
- Region: Gontougo
- Department: Koun-Fao

Population (2014)
  - Total: 25,883
- Time zone: UTC+0 (GMT)

Kouassi-Datékro is a town in eastern Ivory Coast. It is a sub-prefecture and commune of Koun-Fao Department in Gontougo Region, Zanzan District.

In 2014, the population of the sub-prefecture of Kouassi-Datékro was 25,833.

== Villages ==
The xx villages of the sub-prefecture of Kouassi-Datékro and their population in 2014 are:

1. Abongui-Morokro (649)
2. Abongui-Tiékoniyaokro (738)
3. Afféry (442)
4. Amapo Kouassikro (547)
5. Comoékro (1,143)
6. Djoro-Djoro (1,010)
7. Essiantoua (453)
8. Guinankro (450)
9. Kodoman-Bovouanso (144)
10. Koffikokorèkro (115)
11. Kokoyakro (474)
12. Komambo (1,023)
13. Kotronou (774)
14. Kouadiokro (607)
15. Kouakro-Bovouanso (697)
16. Kouassi-Datekro (6,145)
17. Kouassibilékro (434)
18. Missoumihian 1 (1,382)
19. Missoumihian 2 (662)
20. Nambo-Dongbo (1,223)
21. Ouroutara (1,673)
22. Sénandé (1,145)
23. Tiéfoumboura (558)
24. Yakassé-Bini (2,093)
25. Yaokro (489)
26. Yaotrokro (763)

== Notes ==
[[Category:Communes of

Gontougo]]
