= Doropo Department =

Coordinates: 9°49′N 3°21′W

Doropo Department Département de Doropo
- Department
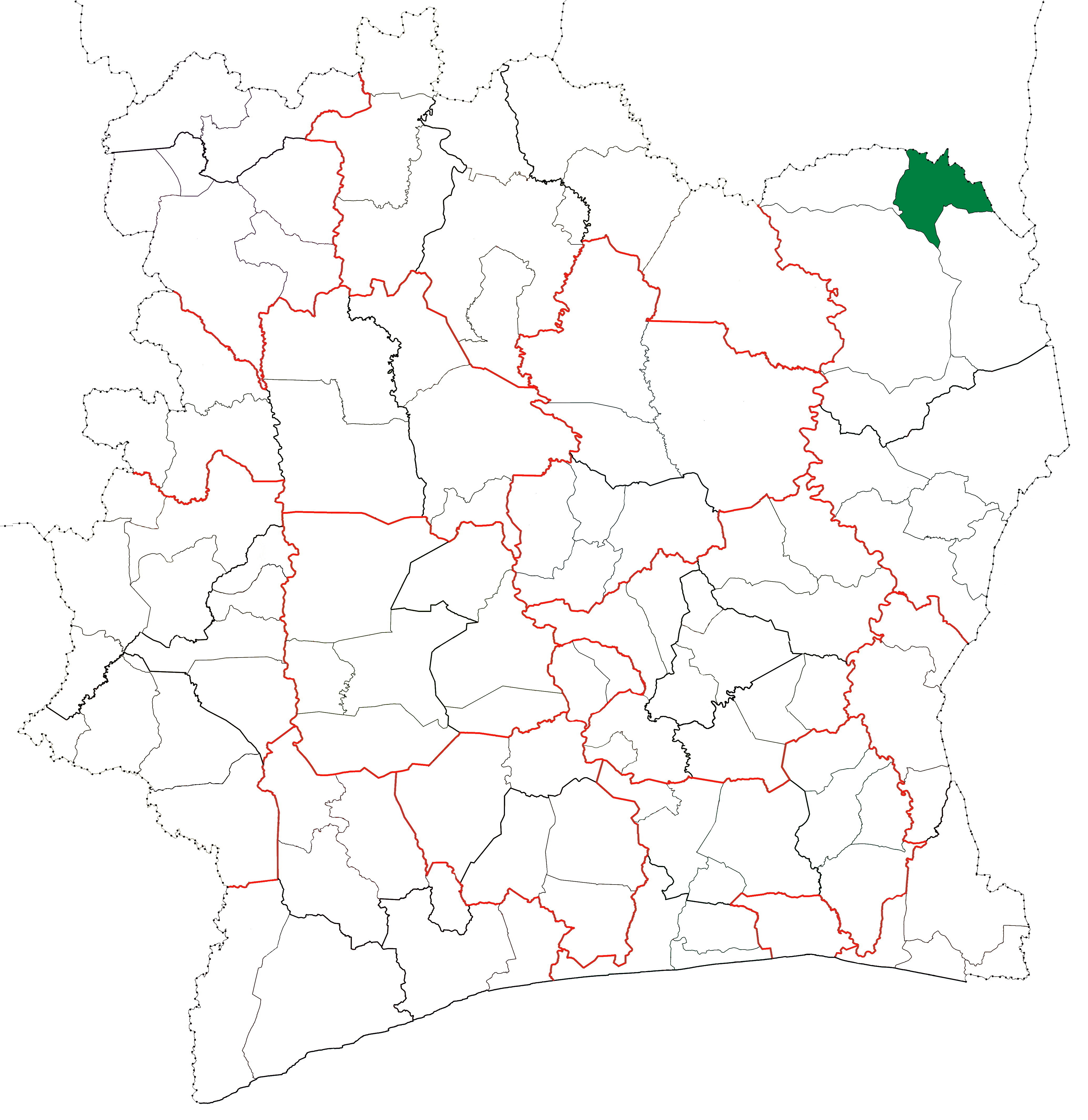
- Location in Ivory Coast. Doropo Department has retained the same boundaries since its creation in 2011.
- Country: Ivory Coast
- District: Zanzan
- Region: Bounkani
- 2011: Established via a division of Bouna Dept
- Departmental seat: Doropo

Government
  - Prefect: Yapi Konan

Area
  - Total: 2,000 km^{2} (770 sq mi)

Population (2021 census)
  - Total: 93,386
  - Density: 47/km^{2} (120/sq mi)
- Time zone: UTC+0 (GMT)

Doropo Department is a department of Bounkani Region in Zanzan District, Ivory Coast. In 2021, its population was 93,386 and its seat is the settlement of Doropo. The sub-prefectures of the department are Danoa, Doropo, Kalamon, and Niamoué.

== History ==
Doropo Department was created in 2011 as part of the restructuring of the subdivisions of Ivory Coast, when departments were converted from the second-level administrative subdivisions of the country to the third-level subdivisions. It and Téhini Department were created by splitting Bouna Department into three departments and a fourth area in Comoé National Park that is not governed by a department.
