= Koun-Fao Department =

Coordinates: 7°29′N 3°15′W

Koun-Fao Department Département de Koun-Fao
- Department
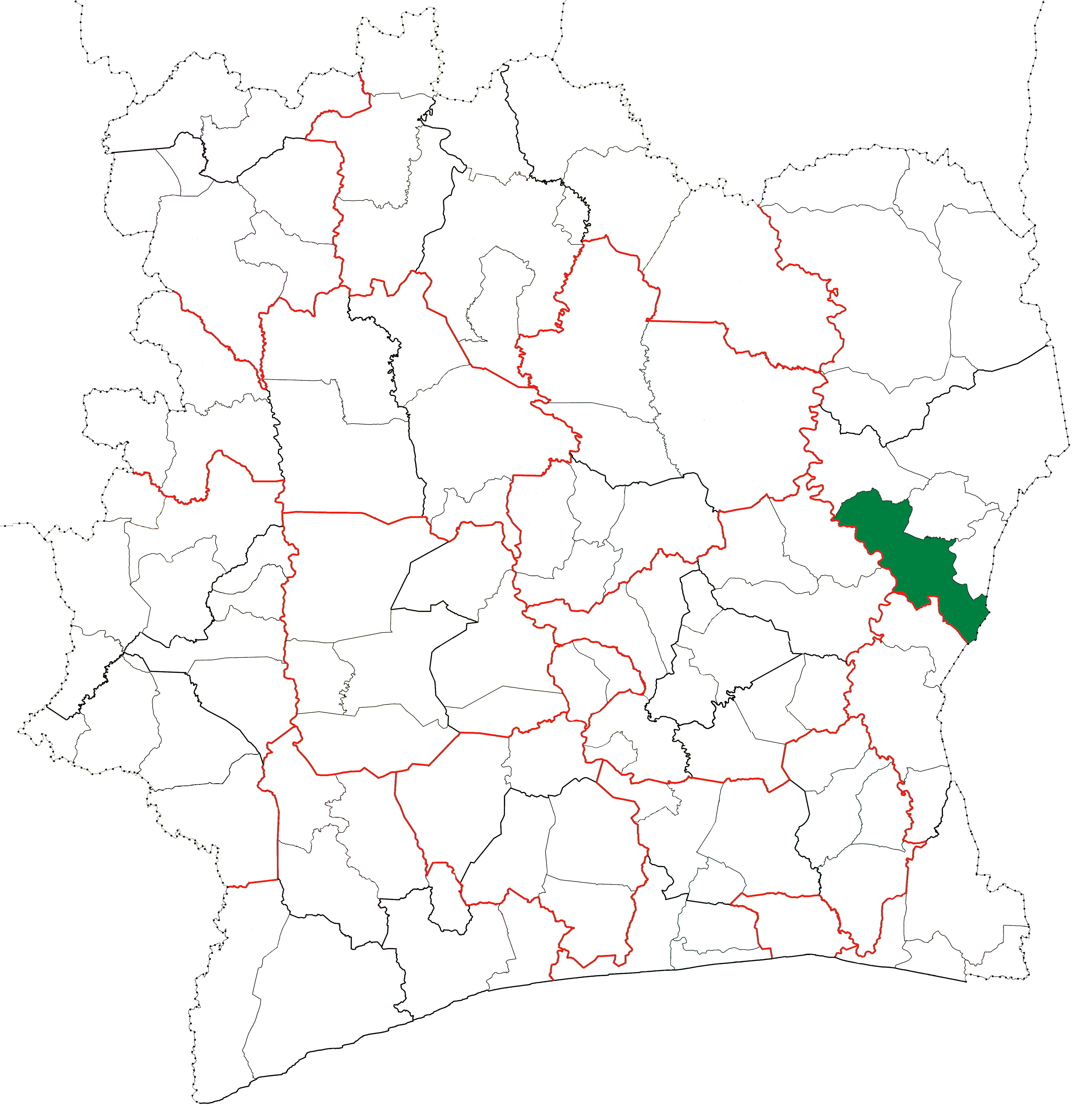
- Location in Ivory Coast. Koun-Fao Department has retained the same boundaries since its creation in 2005.
- Country: Ivory Coast
- District: Zanzan
- Region: Gontougo
- 2005: Established as a second-level subdivision via a division of Tanda Dept
- 2011: Converted to a third-level subdivision
- Departmental seat: Koun-Fao

Government
  - Prefect: Yolande Djirabou

Area
  - Total: 3,600 km^{2} (1,400 sq mi)

Population (2021 census)
  - Total: 167,881
  - Density: 47/km^{2} (120/sq mi)
- Time zone: UTC+0 (GMT)

Koun-Fao Department is a department of Gontougo Region in Zanzan District, Ivory Coast. In 2021, its population was 167,881 and its seat is the settlement of Koun-Fao. The sub-prefectures of the department are Boahia, Kokomian, Kouassi-Datékro, Koun-Fao, Tankessé, and Tienkoikro.

== History ==
Koun-Fao Department was created in 2005 as a second-level subdivision via a split-off from Tanda Department. At its creation, it was part of Zanzan Region.

In 2011, districts were introduced as new first-level subdivisions of Ivory Coast. At the same time, regions were reorganised and became second-level subdivisions and all departments were converted into third-level subdivisions. At this time, Koun-Fao Department became part of Gontougo Region in Zanzan District.
