= Bounkani =

Coordinates: 9°16′N 3°0′W

Bounkani Region Région du Bounkani
- Region
- Seal
- Motto: "Terre des travailleurs"
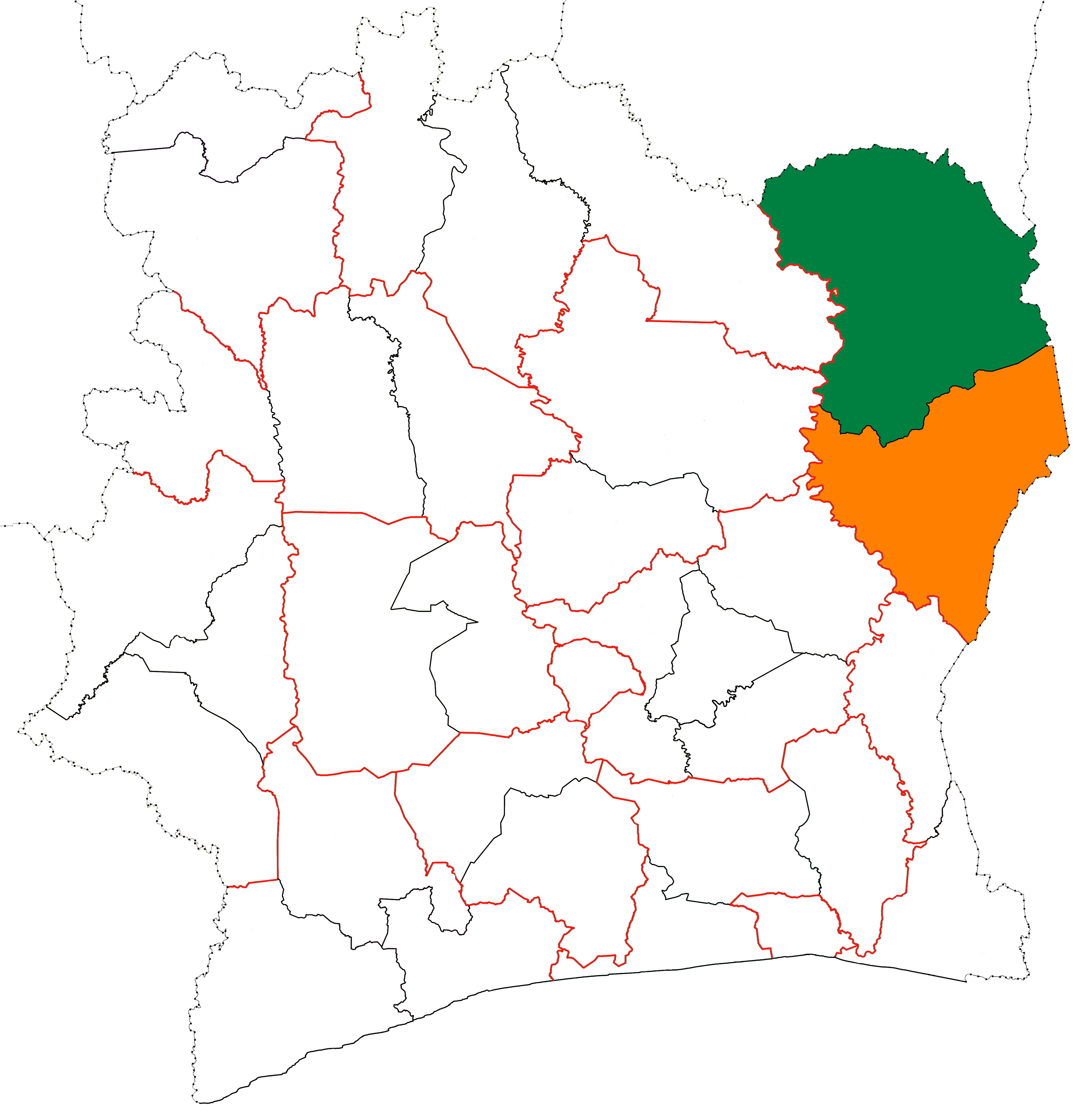
- Location of Bounkani Region (green) in Ivory Coast and in Zanzan District
- Country: Ivory Coast
- District: Zanzan
- Established: 2011
- Regional seat: Bouna

Government
  - Prefect: Tuo Fozié
  - Council President: Philippe Hien

Area
  - Total: 22,080 km^{2} (8,530 sq mi)

Population (2021 census)
  - Total: 427,037
  - Density: 19.34/km^{2} (50.09/sq mi)
- Time zone: UTC+0 (GMT)

Bounkani Region is one of the 31 regions of Ivory Coast. Since its establishment in 2011, it has been one of two regions in Zanzan District. The seat of the region is Bouna and the region's population in the 2021 census was 427,037.

Bounkani is currently divided into four departments: Bouna, Doropo, Nassian, and Téhini.

Just over half of Bounkani (11 090 km^{2}) is located in Comoé National Park. The portion of Bounkani that is within the park is not governed by any department.
