= Zanzan District =

District of Ivory Coast

Coordinates: 8°37′N 3°9′W

Zanzan District District du Zanzan
- District
- Country: Ivory Coast
- Established: 2011
- Capital: Bondoukou

Area
  - Total: 38,200 km^{2} (14,700 sq mi)

Population (2021 census)
  - Total: 1,344,865
  - Density: 35.2/km^{2} (91.2/sq mi)
- ISO 3166 code: CI-ZZ
- HDI (2022): 0.491 low · 11th of 14

Zanzan District (French: District du Zanzan, [zɑ̃.zɑ̃]) is one of fourteen administrative districts of Ivory Coast. The district is located in the northeast of the country. The capital of the district is Bondoukou.

== Creation ==
Zanzan District was created in a 2011 administrative reorganisation of the subdivisions of Ivory Coast. The territory of the district was composed of the former Zanzan Region. The name derives from the Zanzan dynasty who ruled in Gyaman.

== Administrative divisions ==
Zanzan District is currently subdivided into two regions and the following departments:

- Bounkani Region (region seat in Bouna)
  - Bouna Department
  - Nassian Department
  - Doropo Department
  - Tehini Department
- Gontougo Region (region seat also in Bondoukou)
  - Bondoukou Department
  - Koun-Fao Department
  - Tanda Department
  - Sandégué Department
  - Transua Department

== Population ==
According to the 2021 census, Zanzan District has a population of 1,344,865.

=== Religion ===
Religion in Zanzan (2021 census)
Religion	Percent
Christianity	40.7%
Islam	33.2%
None	14.4%
Traditional	9.4%
Other	2.3%

Zanzan has a religiously diverse population. According to the 2021 census, Christianity is the plurality religion in the district (40.7%), followed by Islam (33.2%). A significant share of residents have no religion (14.4%) or adhere to traditional religions (9.4%). A small minority follows other faiths.
