= Ivorian nationality law =

Ivorian Nationality Code

Parliament of Ivory Coast
- Long title: Loi N°. 61415 du 14 Décembre 1961 portant Code de la nationalité ivoirienne (modifiée par la loi No. 64-381 du 7 octobre 1964, la loi No. 72-852 du 21 Décembre 1972, la loi No. 2004-662 du 17 décembre 2004, les décisions No. 2005-03/PR du 15 juillet 2005 et No. 2005-09/ PR du 29 aout 2005, et la Loi No.2013-654 du 13 septembre 2013)
- Enacted by: Government of Ivory Coast
- Status: Current legislation

Ivorian nationality law is regulated by the Constitution of Ivory Coast, as amended; the Ivorian Nationality Code, and its revisions; and various international agreements to which the country is a signatory. These laws determine who is, or is eligible to be, a national of Ivory Coast. The legal means to acquire nationality, formal legal membership in a nation, differ from the domestic relationship of rights and obligations between a national and the nation, known as citizenship. Nationality describes the relationship of an individual to the state under international law, whereas citizenship is the domestic relationship of an individual within the nation. Ivorian nationality is typically obtained under the principle of jus soli, i.e. by birth in Ivory Coast, or jus sanguinis, i.e. by birth in Ivory Coast or abroad to parents with Ivorian nationality. It can be granted to persons with an affiliation to the country, or to a permanent resident who has lived in the country for a given period of time through naturalization.

== Acquisition of nationality ==
Nationality can be acquired in Ivory Coast at birth or later in life through naturalization.

=== By birth ===
Those who acquire nationality at birth include:

- Children born in Ivory Coast to at least one parent with Ivorian nationality; or
- Children born abroad to at least one parent with Ivorian nationality, after completion of an administrative registration process; or

=== By naturalization ===
Naturalization can be granted to persons who have resided in the territory for a sufficient period of time to confirm they understand the customs and traditions of Ivory Coast. General provisions are that applicants have good character and conduct; are in good physical and mental health; and have adequate means to be self-sufficient. Applicants must typically have resided in the country for five years. Besides foreigners meeting the criteria, other persons who may be naturalized include:

- Children legally adopted by an Ivorian parent, at the time of completion of a legal adoption automatically derive Ivorian nationality;
- The spouse of an Ivorian national;
- Minor children may automatically naturalize when their parent acquires nationality;
- Persons who have rendered important service to the nation may naturalize after a two-year residency; or
- Persons who have performed exceptional service to the nation without a residency period.

== Loss of nationality ==
Ivorian nationals can renounce their nationality pending approval by the state. Ivorians of origin may lose their nationality for voluntarily acquiring another nationality or participating in actions, like voting or serving in public office, that indicates they are the national of another country. Naturalized persons may be denaturalized in Ivory for disloyalty to the state; committing crimes against the state or state security; ordinary crimes; or for fraud, misrepresentation, or concealment in a naturalization petition. Persons who previously had nationality and wish to repatriate if they voluntarily lost their status must establish residency and request reinstatement.

== Dual nationality ==
Dual nationality is typically not allowed in Ivory Coast except in the instance of automatic bestowal of nationality for married women or for naturalized persons.

== History ==
=== African empires and European contact (1471–1842) ===
In 1471, Portuguese explorers João de Santarém and Pêro Escobar discovered the gold trade which was active in what is now Ghana and Ivory Coast. The discovery led to the decision to build a fortress and trading station, São Jorge da Mina (now Elmina Castle) in 1481 on the Ghanaian coast. Portugal's exclusive rights to the west coast of Africa were confirmed by the papal bull Romanus Pontifex issued by Pope Nicholas V, which was reconfirmed in the Inter caetera issued in 1493 by Pope Alexander VI. The Portuguese traded throughout the fifteenth and sixteenth centuries with various groups of Akan-speaking people and the Wangara who brought goods from interior regions. The Wangara were aligned with the Mali Empire with whom the Portuguese had long wanted to establish trade. Ignoring the Portuguese claim, France established a settlement in West Africa on the island of N'Dar, which they called Saint-Louis, in 1659. From that base, they expanded, establishing a settlement and mission at Issiny (also Assinie) in 1687, from which they traded guns for gold and ivory. They abandoned it in 1704, as the area known as the Quaqua Coast was typically outside of the normal trading networks of Europeans because of the difficulty of navigating the territory, as it had no harbors and strong coastal currents, making anchoring difficult.

Political upheaval in the Quaqua Coast in the seventeenth century resulted from waves of migrants hoping to escape the slave trade along the Gold Coast. By the eighteenth century, five major African kingdoms emerged in the region, that controlled the interlocked lagoons upon which commerce depended. Under the typical arrangement, paramount chiefs of the kingdom served as arbiters in disputes, distributed resources, and administered broad control of a region. Villages within the kingdom, made up of kin networks, were administered by headmen, who expanded their control and influence by prudent allocations of goods and services in exchange for loyalty. The Abron Kingdom of Gyaman was founded in the northeastern region, near present-day Amanvi in 1690. The Dyula people moved into the area in the sixteenth century and extended their rule by controlling trade networks within villages of the Senufo people in the north central part of the Quaqua. In 1710, the Dyula captured the city of Kong from which they expanded westward to form the Kong Empire. By 1740, two Anyi kingdoms located in the south east, Indénié and Sanwi, had been established. The Baule Kingdom (also Baoulé), emerged around 1750, breaking away from the Ashanti Confederacy and first settling in the south near Tiassalé before expanding northward to the center of the Quaqua Coast at Bouaké. To engage in trade, Europeans had to negotiate with the chiefs who had control of the lagoons, as the navigational difficulties did not allow them to force their control upon the native populations. When the slave trade was abolished in the first half of the nineteenth century, commerce shifted to agricultural products, specifically palm oil, and the French decided to try to reestablish trade in the area.

=== French period (1842–1960) ===
In 1842, under instruction of the French Navy, Édouard Bouët-Willaumez negotiated treaties for land concessions at Issiny and Grand-Bassam, for which they received a trade monopoly in exchange for annual tributes. In 1867, the French had secured a similar arrangement for the village of Baoree (also Bacorees or Bahourie), but they had still been unable secure the whole of the Baule Kingdom in 1885. Arthur Verdier was named the resident minister of the two areas in 1878 and instructed to expand commerce in the area. In 1887, Verdier hired Marcel Treich-Laplène and the French government hired Louis-Gustave Binger, sending them to explore and negotiate treaties with the local inhabitants. Each secured agreements with the major kingdoms of the region and when they met in 1889, declared the southern Quaqua Coast a French protectorate. Later expeditions expanded the boundaries of the protectorate and in 1893, Côte d'Ivoire officially became a colony of France. (Note: The entirety of what is now Ivory Coast was not secured by France until 1918 and the boundaries were not officially established on the north until 1947.)

In 1895, the French established the administration system that would govern its possessions in French West Africa for the next sixty years. A Governor-General was installed and a headquarters was founded in Dakar, in the Colony of Senegal. The Governor-General's authority was extended to Senegal, French Guinea, and the Ivory Coast colonies, and in 1899 to Dahomey and French Sudan. Under Article 109 of the French Constitution of 1848, French territories were to be governed by specific laws until the constitution was extended there. This provision laid the groundwork for nationality legislation based upon whether the native inhabitants were able to be assimilated by adopting European standards. From 1848, those persons who settled in the colonies and were from France were considered nationals who had full rights and were subject to French law. However, those born in the new territories were considered to be nationals without citizenship. Nationals in the older colonies of the Antilles, Guiana, Réunion and parts of India and Senegal were granted political rights, but those in new colonies were confirmed by a decree on 14 July 1865 to be subjects and not citizens, unless they renounced their allegiance to native custom and possessed sufficient understanding of the obligations of citizenship.

Also in 1848, slavery was abolished throughout the French Empire and the Civil Code was extended to all of the French citizens in the colonies. Under the Civil Code, women were legally incapacitated and paternal authority was established over their children. Upon marriage, a woman married to a French man automatically acquired the same nationality as her spouse. Illegitimate children were barred from inheritance and nationality could only be transmitted through a father. Non-citizen nationals were governed by traditional laws concerning marriage and inheritance which placed the well-being of the community above individual rights. These laws prevented a wife from being treated as a slave, required her husband to support her, and entitled her kin to a bride price, to compensate them for the loss of her fertility to their kinship group and secure the legality of the union. Having paid the price for the marriage contract, she and her offspring belonged to the kinship network of her husband and could be inherited if her husband died.

The French Nationality Law of 1889 codified previous statutory laws, changing the French standard from jus sanguinis to jus soli and was extended to the French West Indies. Under its terms, women who would become stateless by the rule to acquire their spouse's nationality were allowed to retain their French nationality upon marriage. The Nationality Law was modified in 1897 when it was extended to the remainder of the French colonies. Clarification in the 1897 decree included that bestowing nationality by birth in French territory only applied to children born in France, restoring descent requirements for the colonies. Under the Code de l'indigénat (Code of Indigenous Status) promulgated for Algeria in 1881 and extended to French West Africa in 1904, nationals in the new colonies followed customary law. The French West African Federation had been founded that year with the existing five colonies, of Dahomey, Guinea, Ivory Coast, Senegal, and French Sudan, and was later expanded to include Mauritania, Niger, and Upper Volta.

From 1908, France implemented laws that would generate income to support the colony by renting land to planters and developed state owned businesses to extract resources and build infrastructure. Initially they required Ivorian males to voluntarily labor on behalf of the state, but as there was still a labor shortages, the administration began importing laborers from other French colonies, like Upper Volta. On 25 May 1912, a Décret N°. 27892 was issued specifically addressing the status of French West Africans. Under its terms, African subjects could acquire French citizenship if at the age of majority and having proved three years of established domicile in the territory, they were able to read and write French; they were of good character and assimilated to French culture, or they engaged in a public or private French enterprise for a minimum or ten years; and they had sufficient means of self-support. The language requirement could be waived for those who had received military medals or recognition of the Legion of Honor or were in the French civil service. Upon application, subjects were required to acknowledge that they gave up their personal status under customary law and were to be governed by French laws. The decree noted that married women and minor children acquired the status of their husband or father however, this was only the case if the marriage had been conducted under French law, rather than customary practice.

Following the end of World War I France passed a law, "Décret N°. 24 on 25 March 1915 that allowed subjects or protected persons who were non-citizen nationals and had established domicile in a French territory to acquire full citizenship, including the naturalization of their wives and minor children, by having received the cross of the Legion of Honor, having obtained a university degree, having rendered service to the nation, having attained the rank of an officer or received a medal from the French army, who had married a Frenchwoman and established a one-year residency; or who had resided for more than ten years in a colony other than their country of origin. A 1918 decree written for French West Africa was aimed at decorated veterans of the war and their families, providing they had not previously been denied their rights nor participated in actions against French rule.

In 1927, France passed a new Nationality Law, which under Article 8, removed the requirement for married women to automatically derive the nationality of a husband and provided that her nationality could only be changed if she consented to change her nationality. It also allowed children born in France to native-born French women married to foreigners to acquire their nationality from their mothers. When it was implemented it included Guadeloupe, Martinique and Réunion but was extended to the remaining French possessions for French citizens only in 1928. Under Article 26 of the 1928 decree was the stipulation that it did not apply to natives of the French possessions except Algeria, Guadeloupe, Martinique, and Réunion. Between 1933 and 1947, the territory of Upper Volta was divided up and incorporated into the colonies of French Sudan, the Ivory Coast, and Niger. This was done to facilitate construction of a railway and ports in Ivory Coast, as well as provide labor for cocao and coffee plantations. In 1938, the legal incapacity of married women was finally invalidated for French citizens. In 1939, France determined that marriage and inheritance were too significant to continue being dealt with in native courts. That year, the Mandel Decree was enacted in French West Africa as well as French Equatorial Africa. Under its terms child marriage was discouraged. It established the minimum age at marriage as fourteen for women and sixteen for men, invalidated marriages wherein spouses did not consent, and nullified levirate marriage without approval of the woman.

During World War II, the program of forced labor escalated and Ivorians were required to double their requirement of volunteer labor, were conscripted into the army, and were mandated to provide a large portion of their agricultural products for the military. The policies led to widespread discontent and protests, which were organized by Félix Houphouët-Boigny, who would later become Ivory Coast's first president. At the end of the war, a statute issued on 7 March 1944 granted French citizenship to those who had performed services to the nation, such as serving as civil servants or receiving recognitions. The Constitution of 1946 granted French citizenship to all subjects of France's territories without having to renounce their personal status as natives. In 1945, a new Code of French Nationality was passed, which conferred once again automatic French nationality on foreign wives of French men, but allowed mothers who were French nationals to pass their nationality to children born outside of France. It expressly applied to Algeria, French Guiana, Guadeloupe, Martinique and Réunion and was extended to the Overseas Territories in 1953, but in the case of the latter had distinctions for the rights of those who were naturalized. In 1951 the Jacquinot Decree strengthened the provisions in French West and Equatorial Africa of the Mandel decree removing women who were twenty-one years old, or divorced, from control by a father or guardian and establishing specific rules for the payment and determining the amount of a bride price.

The legal framework of Ivory Coast was changed by the Loi-cadre Defferre issued on 23 June 1956, which granted internal self-governance to French territories and expanded their Territorial Assemblies. These changes led to an increase in political activity and a press for the dissolution of the Federation of French West Africa. Houphouët-Boigny led the groups of African leaders who wanted independence from France and worked to develop a pan-African coalition. With the passage of the 1958 French Constitution, nationality provisions were standardized for France, Overseas Departments, and Overseas Territories. Article 86 excluded the possibility for independence of the colonies, but allowed them to become autonomous republics. Ivory Coast's decision in the referendum regarding the constitution was to remain part of the French Community and in 1959, it adopted its first constitution. The French Constitution was amended in 1960 to allow states to maintain membership in the Community even if they were independent republics. Ivory Coast rejected the proposal and opted for independence without remaining in the French union.

=== Post-independence (1960–present) ===
The Ivory Coast gained its independence on 7 August 1960. At independence, those who had French nationality and were natives of Ivory Coast as of 1946 were conferred the Ivorian nationality. On 14 December 1961, the first Ivorian Nationality Code (Loi N°. 61415) was adopted, based on the French model. Under its provisions after independence, nationality would be derived by having a parent who had Ivorian nationality. It specifically excluded children born in the territory to two foreign parents from automatically obtaining Ivorian status, but included any child of unknown parentage discovered to be living in Ivory Coast. Taking into account the large numbers of migrants who resided in the country because of the labor policies of France, children born in Ivory Coast could naturalize by declaration to obtain Ivorian nationality. To acquire nationality by declaration, a residency of five years was required. Persons born between 19 December 1940 and 19 December 1961 could make a declaration before reaching age twenty-one, as could persons born after 19 December 1961, who had lived in the territory for the required five years. In addition, any foreigner, who was present in the territory at independence and habitually lived in Ivory Coast, could opt within one year to acquire nationality through a special process. Foreign women who were married to Ivorians acquired Ivorian nationality, but foreign men could not derive nationality from their wives. On 7 October 1964, an amendment to the Nationality Code (Loi N°. 61415), provided for acquisition of nationality by adoptees and foster children raised by Ivorians. In the case of the latter, the child could acquire nationality by declaration prior to reaching majority, after five years of being a ward in the child welfare service.

On 21 December 1972 the Nationality Code was amended (Loi N°. 72-852) to eliminate the provisions for Ivorian nationality to be acquired through birth in the territory, though only 36 people had acquired nationality under the provision of jus soli. This meant that orphans, foundlings and children born to foreign parents in Ivory Coast could no longer obtain Ivorian nationality. These changes were in reaction to not only an attempt to limit nationality to those who were assimilated to Ivorian culture, but also as a result of a large influx of orphaned refugees who came to Ivory Coast during the Nigerian Civil War. In 1995, after many years of lobbying for a correction of their situation, workers who had been brought from Upper Volta when its territory was incorporated into Ivory Coast in 1932 were extended collective naturalization under Decree N°. 95-809. Over 8,000 persons were admitted to Ivorian nationality under the decree.

As a result of the 1999 Ivorian coup d'état, the 2000 Constitution, restricted that persons wishing to stand for president were barred from having dual nationality and were required not only to have Ivorian origin, but also parents who had Ivorian nationality of origin. The African Commission on Human and Peoples' Rights ruled in 2008, that the provision violated Article 13 of the African Charter on Human and Peoples' Rights. Following the coup, social tension, human rights violations, and political posturing split the populace along ethnic and religious lines. Violence erupted and in 2002, a failed coup d'état and identity politics led to civil war. A commission was formed and met in Paris to draft a negotiated peace. The 2003 treaty, known as the Linas-Marcoussis Agreement, called for an end to state-sponsored discrimination against foreigners, suspension of the government's identity program, and updated naturalization processes for migrants and their descendants. It also specifically stated that gender discrimination in the acquisition of nationality by marriage should end.

On 17 December 2004, the Nationality Code was amended (Loi N°. 2004–662) to comply with the treaty. It provided a simplified process for naturalization to those who were residing in the country prior to independence or had long-established residency but who had been unable to obtain nationality in the one-year window under the 1961 statute, basically reinstating the prior provisions for one year. It also provided that foreign husbands of Ivorian wives could opt for Ivorian nationality after having been married for two years. The provisions for acquiring nationality through marriage were further modified by Presidential Decree N°. 2005-03/PR of 15 July 2005, which specified nationality could be obtained if during the marriage ceremony the foreign spouse consented to a change in nationality and declared that they wanted to acquire Ivorian status. Presidential Decree N°. 2005-09/PR of 29 August 2005, specified that in an effort to prevent fraudulent marriage, nationality would be lost if the marriage ended in divorce prior to ten years of matrimony. The simplified nationality plan was ineffectual, allowing only 175 people to acquire Ivorian status out of nearly 2,000 applicants.

Loi N°. 2013-654 amending the nationality law on 13 September 2013 provided for spouses to equally acquire nationality through marriage. It also re-established temporary procedures to acquire nationality by declaration. It allowed until 24 January 2016, the acquisition of nationality by a simple and non-discretionary statement. Those who for whom it applied were declarants who were born to foreign parents in Ivory Coast and were not twenty-one on 20 December 1961; those who had permanently lived in the territory prior to independence and their children; and those born in the territory between 20 December 1961 and 25 January 1973. Two areas retain gender discrimination; Article 45 provides that when a woman naturalizes and has legitimate or legitimized child(ren), nationality can only be derived from the mother, if she is a widow and Article 56 denaturalizes the wife and child of an Ivorian national upon his being deprived of nationality. In 2013, Ivory Coast acceded to the United Nations' Convention on the Reduction of Statelessness of 1961, creating a legal obligation to grant Ivorian nationality to foundlings discovered in its territory or children who would otherwise be stateless.
