= Kissy =

Kissy may refer to:

- Kissy, Sierra Leone, neighborhood on the eastern end of Freetown, Sierra Leone
- Kissy Suzuki, fictional character in Ian Fleming's 1964 James Bond novel, You Only Live Twice
- A character in the arcade game Baraduke
- Kissy Sell Out (born 1984), English DJ
- Kissy Duerré, Canadian TikToker
- Kissy Simmons (born 1969), American actress
- Cédric Marshall Kissy (born 1988), Ivorian poet
- Kissy Missy, a character in the horror video game Poppy Playtime

== See also ==
- Kissi (disambiguation), a language and people in West Africa
- Kissie (born 1991), Swedish blogger
