= List of colonial governors of Ivory Coast =

List of the colonial governors of French Ivory Coast−Côte d'Ivoire, a colony in former French West Africa.

== Colonial governors ==
- Dates in italics indicate de facto continuation of office.

Term	Incumbent	Notes
French Suzerainty
1842	French protectorates declared over the Kingdoms of Nzima and Sanwi, part of the Colony of Gorée and Dependencies	
1843 to 1843	Charles-Marie Philippes de Kerhallet, Commandant-Superior	
1843 to 1844	Thomas Jules Séraphin Besson, Commandant-Superior	
1844 to 1845	Joseph Pellegrin, Commandant-Superior	
1845 to 1847	Conjard, Commandant-Superior	
1847 to 1848	Camille-Adolphe Pigeon, Commandant-Superior	
1848 to 1850	Jean-Jules-Charles Boulay, Commandant-Superior	
1851 to 1853	Charles-Gabriel-Felicité Martin des Pallières, Commandant-Superior	
1853 to 1854	François Chirat, Commandant-Superior	
1854 to 1855	Pierre-Alexandre Mailhetard, Commandant-Superior	1st Term
1855 to 1856	Noël Bruyas, Commandant-Superior	
1857 to 1857	Charles-Praul Brossard de Corbigny, Commandant-Superior	
1858 to 1859	Pierre-Alexandre Maihetard, Commandant-Superior	2nd Term
1859 to 4 October 1860	..., Commandant-Superior	
Ivory Coast territory of the Ivory Coast-Gabon colony
4 October 1860 to 10 November 1860	..., Commandant-Superior	
10 November 1860 to July 1862	Charles-René-Gabriel Liébault, Commandant-Superior	
28 August 1862 to 14 January 1863	Joseph Alem, Commandant-Superior	
29 April 1863 to 1863	Jean-Antione-Léonard-Eudore Noyer, Commandant-Superior	
1863 to 1864	Jacques-Bertrand-Osacar Desnouy, Commandant-Superior	
1864 to 1866	Jean-Auguste Martin, Commandant-Superior	
1866 to 1867	Léon Noël, Commandant-Superior	
1867 to 1869	Alfred Pouzols, Commandant-Superior	
1869 to 1871	Jean-Louis Vernet, Commandant-Superior	
1871 to 10 November 1878	Arthur Verdier, Resident (of Arthur Verdier & Company)	Warden of the French Flag to 1878
Arthur Verdier & Company administration Recognised by France
10 November 1878 to 1881	Arthur Verdier, Resident (of Arthur Verdier & Company)	
Under the Superior Commandant of Gabon and the Gulf of Guinea Settlements
1881 to 16 December 1883	Arthur Verdier, Resident (of Arthur Verdier & Company)	Administration under private traders; protectorates maintained by France
Under French Guinea
16 December 1883 to 1885	Arthur Verdier, Resident (of Arthur Verdier & Company)	
Direct French rule
1885 to 1886	Charles Bour, Commandant-particular	
Under the Lieutenant Governors of Guinea
1886 to 10 January 1889	Marcel Treich-Leplène, Resident	
French Protectorate of Ivory Coast	Direct French rule under the Lieutenant Governors of Guinea	
10 January 1889 to 9 March 1890	Marcel Treich-Leplène, Resident	
9 March 1890 to 14 June 1890	Jean-Joseph-Étienne-Octave Péan, acting Resident	
14 June 1890 to 1892	Jean-Auguste-Henri Desailles, Resident	
1892 to 1892	Eloi Bricard, acting Resident	
1892 to 12 November 1892	Julien Voisin, acting Resident	
12 November 1892 to 10 March 1893	Paul Alphonse Frédéric Heckman, Resident	
French Colony of Ivory Coast
10 March 1893 to 1895	Louis-Gustave Binger, Governor	
16 June 1885	Incorporated into French West Africa	
1895 to 1895	Paul Cousturier, acting Governor	
1895 to 1896	Joseph Lemaire, acting Governor	
1896 to 25 February 1896	Pierre-Hubert-Auguste Pascal, acting Governor	
25 February 1896 to 13 May 1896	Eugène Bertin, acting Governor	
13 May 1896 to 14 May 1896	Jean-Baptiste Castaing, acting Governor	
14 May 1896 to 19 March 1898	Louis Mouttet, Governor	
1898 to 1898	Adrien Jules Jean Bonhoure, Governor	
1898 to 1898	Jean Penel, acting Governor	
1898 to 1898	Pierre-Paul-Marie Capest, acting Governor	
1898 to 11 September 1898	... Ribes, acting Governor	
11 September 1898 to 5 November 1902	Henri-Charles-Victor-Amédée Roberdeau, Governor	
5 November 1902 to 25 November 1902	Albert Anatole Nebout, acting Governor	1st Term
25 November 1902 to 19 November 1905	Marie-François-Joseph Clozel, acting Governor	
19 November 1905 to 27 October 1906	Albert Anatole Nebout, acting Governor	2nd Term
27 October 1906 to 25 April 1908	Marie-François-Joseph Clozel, Governor	2nd Term
25 August 1907 to 1908	Albert Anatole Nebout, acting Governor	3rd Term
25 April 1908 to 28 April 1909	Gabriel-Louis Angoulvant, Governor	1st Term
28 April 1908 to August 1908	Pierre Brun, acting Governor	
August 1909 to 12 May 1911	Gabriel-Louis Angoulvant, Governor	2nd Term
12 May 1911 to 9 March 1912	Casimir Guyon, acting Governor	1st Term
9 March 1912 to 22 May 1913	Gabriel-Louis Angoulvant, Governor	3rd Term
22 March 1913 to 29 October 1913	Casimir Guyon, acting Governor	2nd Term
29 October 1913 to 4 September 1914	Gustave Julien, acting Governor	
4 September 1914 to 16 June 1916	Gabriel-Louis Angoulvant, Governor	4th Term
16 June 1916 to 1 December 1916	Maurice-Pierre Lapalud, acting Governor	1st Term
1 December 1916 to 27 December 1916	Gabriel-Louis Angoulvant, Governor	5th Term
27 December 1916 to January 1918	Maurice-Pierre Lapalud, acting Governor	2nd Term
January 1918 to June 1919	Raphaël-Valentin-Marius Antonetti, Governor	1st Term
June 1919 to 22 September 1919	Maurice Beurnier, acting Governor	
22 September 1919 to 24 January 1922	Raphaël-Valentin-Marius Antonetti, Governor	2nd Term
24 January 1922 to 28 September 1922	Pierre Chapon-Baissac, acting Governor	
28 September 1922 to 2 April 1924	Raphaël-Valentin-Marius Antonetti	3rd Term
2 April 1924 to 2 July 1925	Richard-Édmond-Maurice-Édouard Brunot, acting Governor	
2 July 1925 to 25 August 1930	Maurice-Pierre Lapalud, Governor	3rd Term
25 August 1930 to 28 October 1930	Joseph Jules Brévié, Governor	
28 October 1930 to 16 January 1931	Jean Paul Boutonnet, acting Governor	
16 January 1931 to 7 May 1935	Dieudonné François Joseph Marie Reste, Governor	
7 May 1935 to 28 June 1935	Marie Alphonse Flotte de Pouzols, acting Governor	
28 June 1935 to 7 March 1936	Adolphe Deitte, Governor	
7 March 1936 to 28 November 1936	Julien Georges Lamy, acting Governor	
28 November 1936 to 16 July 1938	Gaston-Charles-Julien Mondon, Governor	
16 July 1938 to 27 January 1939	Louis Bressolles, acting Governor	
27 January 1939 to 1 January 1941	Horace-Valentin Crocicchia, Governor	
1 January 1941 to 29 September 1942	Hubert-Jules Deschamps, Governor	
29 September 1942 to 3 August 1943	Georges-Pierre Rey, Governor	
3 August 1943 to 26 August 1943	Jean-François Toby, Governor	
26 August 1943 to 16 August 1945	André-Jean-Gaston Latrille, Governor	1st Term
16 August 1945 to April 1946	Henry Jean Marie de Mauduit, Governor	
Ivory Coast Territory	Overseas territory of France	
April 1946 to 20 February 1947	André-Jean-Gaston Latrille, Governor	2nd Term (contd.)
20 February 1947 to 29 January 1948	Oswald-Marcellin-Maurice-Maruis Durand, Governor	
29 January 1948 to 10 November 1948	Georges-Louis-Joseph Orselli, Governor	
10 November 1948 to 25 April 1952	Laurent Élisée Péchoux, Governor	
25 April 1952 to 10 July 1952	Pierre-François Pelieu, Governor	
10 July 1952 to 19 February 1954	Camille-Victor Bailly, Governor	
19 February 1954 to 18 February 1956	Pierre-Joseph-Auguste Messmer, Governor	
18 February 1956 to 23 February 1957	Pierre-Auguste-Michel-Marie Lami, Governor	
Republic of Ivory Coast	Autonomous	
23 February 1957 to 15 July 1960	Ernest de Nattes, Governor, High Commissioner	
15 July 1960 to 7 August 1960	Yves-René-Henri Guéna, High Commissioner	
7 August 1960	Independence as Republic of Ivory Coast	

== See also ==
- Colonial heads of Ivory Coast
- Governors of French West Africa
- Lists of French colonial governors and administrators
- For continuation after independence, see: Heads of state of Côte d'Ivoire
