= Assini =

Assini may refer to:

- Mark Assini, a syndicated columnist and former public official from New York
- Assinie, a resort town in Côte d'Ivoire
