= Marcel Treich-Laplène =

French colonial governor (1860–1890)

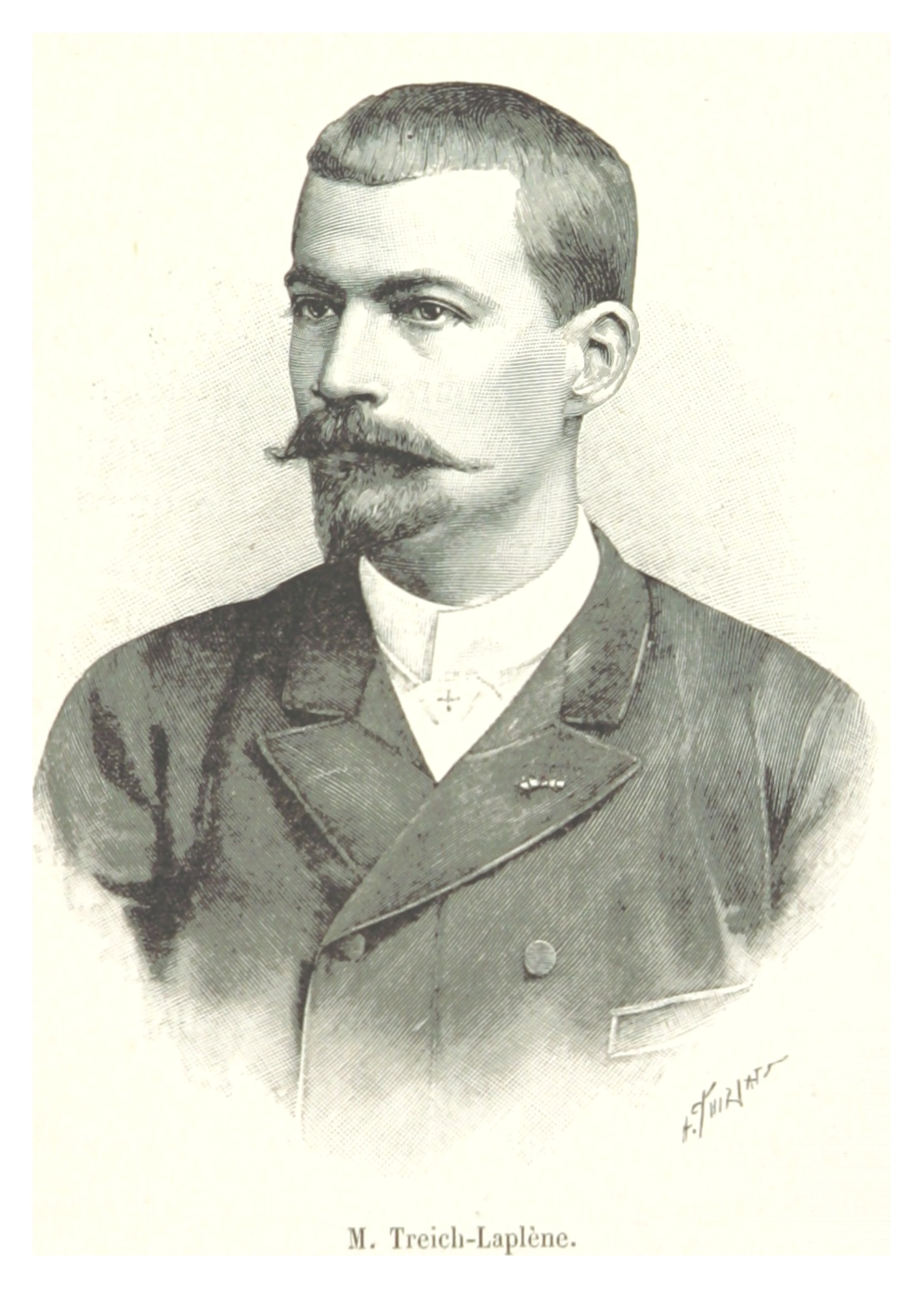

Personal details
- Born: 24 June 1860 Ussel, Corrèze
- Died: 9 March 1890 (aged 29) Grand-Bassam
- Occupation: Geographical exploration, Colonial administrator
- Distinction: Chevalier of the Legion of Honour

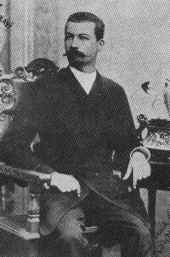
Marcel Treich-Laplène

Marcel Treich-Laplène (24 June 1860 – 9 March 1890), was the first colonial administrator of Côte d'Ivoire.

== Life ==
Marcel Treich-Laplène was the son of Gustave Treich-Lapèlne, a notary of Meymac, who became the mayor of Ussel, after being the magistrate of Tizi Ouzou, then Kabylie, and finally Comores.

After the death of his father in 1882, Treich-Laplene returned from his military service in Algeria, and suspended his legal studies. With the help of a friend of his father's, he was hired as a tutor in La Rochelle, France. It was here that he met Arthur Verdier, with whom Treich-Laplene and Louis-Gustave Binger later travelled to West Africa to establish the colony of Côte d'Ivoire.

Treich-Laplene died in Grand-Bassam, the old capital of Côte d'Ivoire on 9 March 1890. He died onboard the ship SS Ville de Maceio, a steamboat that plied the route between France and West Africa on which Joseph Conrad sailed in May 1890.

Treich-Laplene is memorialised with monuments in Ussel, Corrèze, in France, and with an obelisk in Grand-Bassam. The neighbourhood of Abidjan, Ivory Coast is named Treichville. Treich-Laplene's archives are held in the French national archives.
