= Dicolectes aulicus =

Scientific classification
- Kingdom: Animalia
- Phylum: Arthropoda
- Clade: Pancrustacea
- Class: Insecta
- Order: Coleoptera
- Suborder: Polyphaga
- Infraorder: Cucujiformia
- Family: Chrysomelidae
- Genus: Dicolectes
- Species: D. aulicus

Binomial name
- Dicolectes aulicus Lefèvre, 1886

Synonyms
- Dicolectes aulicus var. reinecki Kuntzen, 1912

Species of beetle

Dicolectes aulicus is a species of leaf beetle of West Africa and the Democratic Republic of the Congo. It was first described from Assinie by Édouard Lefèvre in 1886.
