= Historic Town of Grand-Bassam =

- Ville historique de Grand-Bassam (French)
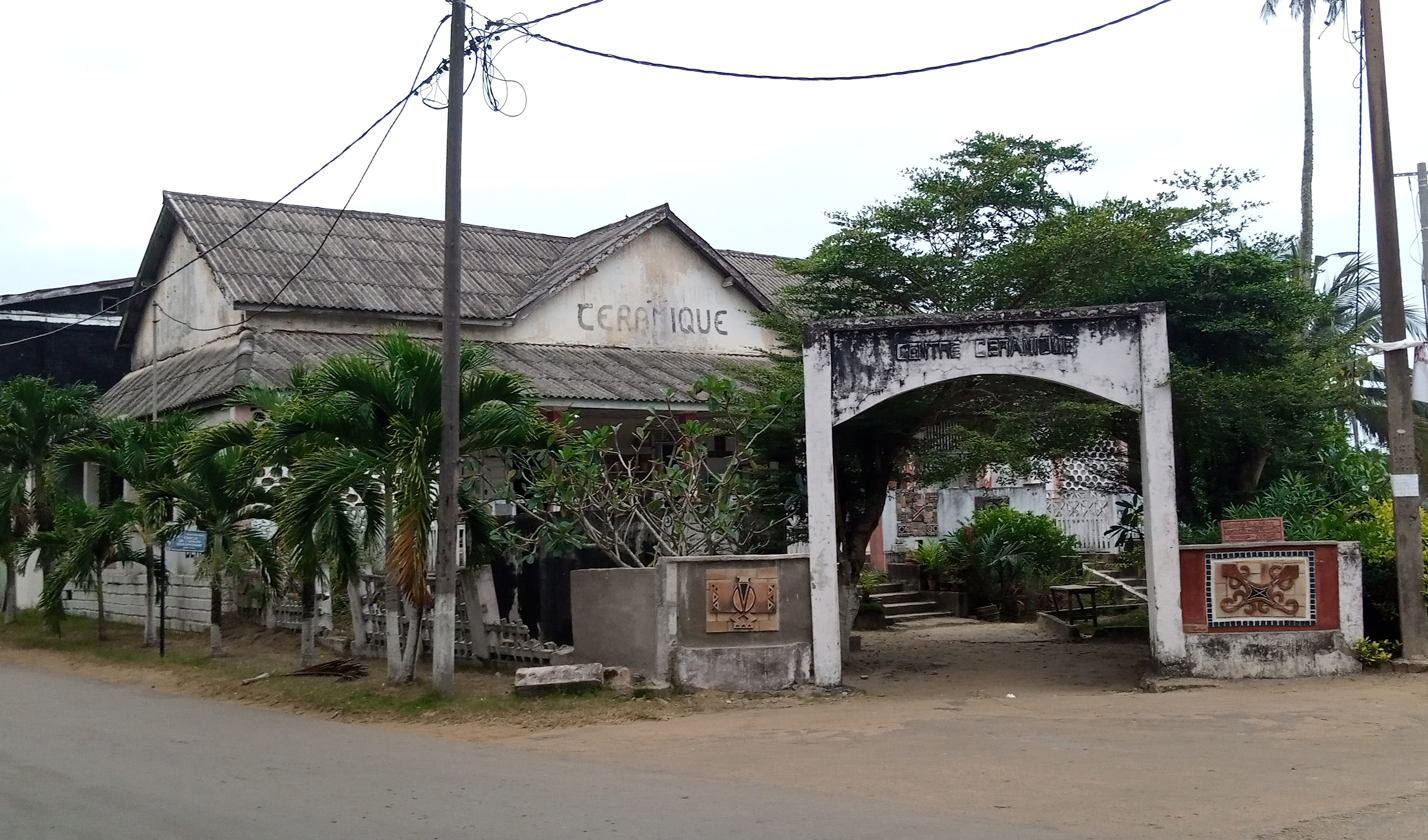
- Building in Historic Town of Grand-Bassam

- Location within Ivory Coast Location within Africa
- 5°11′45″N 3°44′11″W
- Type: Settlement
- Location: Grand-Bassam, Ivory Coast

UNESCO World Heritage Site
- Official name: Historic Town of Grand-Bassam
- Type: Cultural
- Criteria: (iii)(iv)
- Designated: 2012
- Reference no.: 1322
- Region: African States

The Historic Town of Grand-Bassam is the old part of the city of Grand-Bassam in Ivory Coast. It was listed as a UNESCO World Heritage Site in 2012.

== History ==
The first capital of Côte d'Ivoire, the Historic Town of Grand-Bassam, is an example of a late 19th- and early 20th-century colonial town planned with quarters specializing in commerce, administration, housing for Europeans and for Africans. The site includes the N’zima African fishing village alongside colonial architecture marked by functional houses with galleries, verandas and gardens. Grand-Bassam was the most important port, economic and judicial centre of Côte d'Ivoire. It bears witness to the complex social relations between Europeans and Africans, and to the subsequent independence movement. As a vibrant centre of the territory of French trading posts in the Gulf of Guinea, which preceded modern Côte d'Ivoire, it attracted populations from all parts of Africa, Europe and the Mediterranean Levant.

== Sources ==
This article incorporates text from a free content work. Licensed under CC BY-SA IGO 3.0 (license statement/permission). Text taken from Historic Town of Grand-Bassam, UNESCO World Heritage Centre.
