= Dicolectes rugulosus =

Scientific classification
- Kingdom: Animalia
- Phylum: Arthropoda
- Clade: Pancrustacea
- Class: Insecta
- Order: Coleoptera
- Suborder: Polyphaga
- Infraorder: Cucujiformia
- Family: Chrysomelidae
- Genus: Dicolectes
- Species: D. rugulosus

Binomial name
- Dicolectes rugulosus Lefèvre, 1886

Synonyms
- Dicolectes rugulosus var. pseudornatus Kuntzen, 1914

Species of beetle

Dicolectes rugulosus is a species of leaf beetle. It is distributed in the Democratic Republic of the Congo, South Sudan and Ivory Coast. It was described by Édouard Lefèvre in 1886.
