= Dicolectes =

Scientific classification
- Kingdom: Animalia
- Phylum: Arthropoda
- Clade: Pancrustacea
- Class: Insecta
- Order: Coleoptera
- Suborder: Polyphaga
- Infraorder: Cucujiformia
- Family: Chrysomelidae
- Subfamily: Eumolpinae
- Tribe: Bromiini
- Genus: Dicolectes; Lefèvre, 1886

Synonyms
- Stratioderus Weise, 1895

Genus of leaf beetles from Africa

Dicolectes is a genus of leaf beetles in the subfamily Eumolpinae. It is distributed in Africa.

== Species ==
- Dicolectes atripes Pic, 1953
- Dicolectes aulicus Lefèvre, 1886
- Dicolectes clavareaui Kuntzen, 1914
- Dicolectes erythropus Lefèvre, 1886
- Dicolectes fortis (Weise, 1895)
- Dicolectes impressiceps Pic, 1938
- Dicolectes minor (Weise, 1903)
- Dicolectes ornatus (Jacoby, 1894)
- Dicolectes rufipes Pic, 1938
- Dicolectes rugulosus Lefèvre, 1886
- Dicolectes semipurpureus Pic, 1938
- Dicolectes spinicollis Burgeon, 1941
