= Dicolectes clavareaui =

Scientific classification
- Kingdom: Animalia
- Phylum: Arthropoda
- Clade: Pancrustacea
- Class: Insecta
- Order: Coleoptera
- Suborder: Polyphaga
- Infraorder: Cucujiformia
- Family: Chrysomelidae
- Genus: Dicolectes
- Species: D. clavareaui

Binomial name
- Dicolectes clavareaui Kuntzen, 1914

Species of beetle

Dicolectes clavareaui is a species of leaf beetle of the Democratic Republic of the Congo, first described by Heinrich Kuntzen in 1914.
