= Dicolectes ornatus =

Scientific classification
- Kingdom: Animalia
- Phylum: Arthropoda
- Clade: Pancrustacea
- Class: Insecta
- Order: Coleoptera
- Suborder: Polyphaga
- Infraorder: Cucujiformia
- Family: Chrysomelidae
- Genus: Dicolectes
- Species: D. ornatus

Binomial name
- Dicolectes ornatus (Jacoby, 1894)

Synonyms
- Nerissus ornata Jacoby, 1894

Species of beetle

Dicolectes ornatus is a species of leaf beetle of the Democratic Republic of the Congo, described by Martin Jacoby in 1894.
