= Dicolectes fortis =

Scientific classification
- Kingdom: Animalia
- Phylum: Arthropoda
- Clade: Pancrustacea
- Class: Insecta
- Order: Coleoptera
- Suborder: Polyphaga
- Infraorder: Cucujiformia
- Family: Chrysomelidae
- Genus: Dicolectes
- Species: D. fortis

Binomial name
- Dicolectes fortis (Weise, 1895)

Synonyms
- Stratioderus fortis Weise, 1895

Species of beetle

Dicolectes fortis is a species of leaf beetle of West Africa and the Democratic Republic of the Congo. It was first described from Ghana by Julius Weise in 1895.
