= Charles-Marie Philippes de Kerhallet =

French navigator (1809–1863)

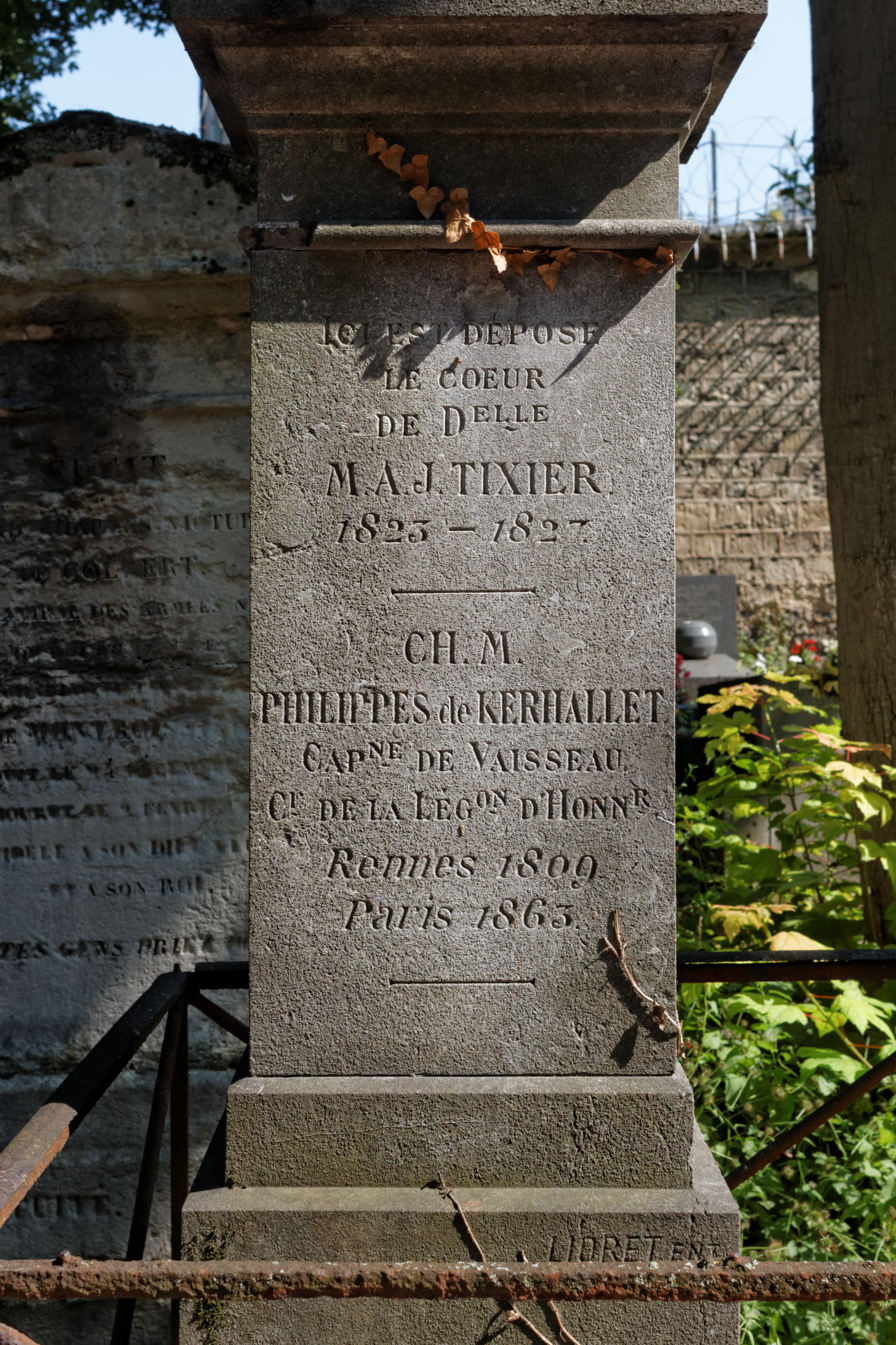
Grave of Charles-Marie Philippe de Kerhallet at Père-Lachaise cemetery.

Charles-Marie Philippes de Kerhallet (French: [ʃaʁl maʁi filip də kɛʁalɛ]; 17 September 1809, in Rennes – 16 February 1863, in Paris) was a French navigator. He received his education in the naval school of Angoulême, became a midshipman in 1825, and was promoted captain in 1849. He served in South America, commanded the stations of Newfoundland and Cayenne, made soundings in the Gulf of Mexico, and prepared valuable charts. His works include Instructions pour remonter la côte du Brésil depuis San Luiz de Maranhão jusqu'au Para (Paris, 1841); Description nautique de la côte du Mexique (1849); Description nautique de la côte de l'isthme de Panama (1850); Considérations générales sur l'Océan Atlantique (1852); Considérations générales sur l'Ocean Pacifique (1853); and La navigation dans la mer des Antilles et le golfe du Mexique (1859). His contributions to science include refinements to understands of oceanic gyres.

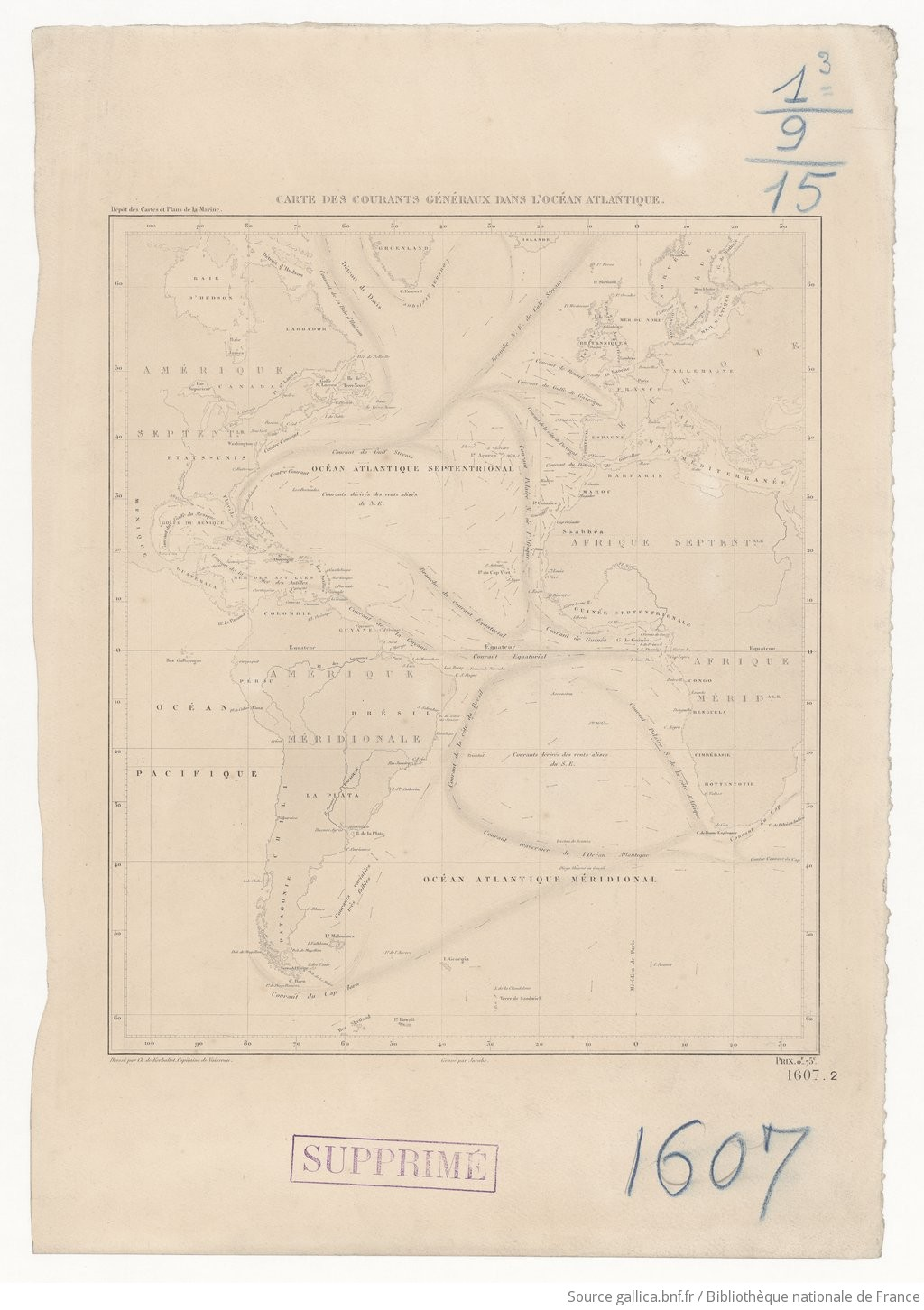
Map of Atlantic Ocean currents by Kerhallet (cartographer) and Jacobs (engraver)

== See also ==
- List of colonial heads of Côte d'Ivoire
