= Kissi =

Kissi may refer to the following :

- Kissi, Burkina Faso, an African archaeological site
- Kissi language, of the Niger–Congo family
- Kissi penny, an iron currency in West Africa
- Kissi people, in Guinea, Sierra Leone and Liberia
- Greek name of Roman Cissi in Mauretania Caesariensis (now Djinet in Algeria)
