= Assinie-Mafia =

- Town and sub-prefecture
- Location in Ivory Coast
- Coordinates: 5°8′N 3°20′W
- Country: Ivory Coast
- District: Comoé
- Region: Sud-Comoé
- Department: Adiaké

Population (2014)
  - Total: 16,721
- Time zone: UTC+0 (GMT)

Assinie-Mafia is a coastal resort town in south-eastern Ivory Coast. It is a sub-prefecture of Adiaké Department in Sud-Comoé Region, Comoé District.

== Geography ==
Assinie-Mafia is located 80 kilometres east of Abidjan along the coast of the Gulf of Guinea. Access to the area is by road A100 going east from Abidjan then turning right to the B-107 road (Route Assinie) then Route Assinie-Mafia along the coast. The road ends at Assinie-Mafia. Assinie-Mafia is a long narrow settlement along the coast on both sides of the outlet of Aby Lagoon.

Assinie-Mafia was a commune until March 2012, when it became one of 1,126 communes nationwide that were abolished.

The Assinie area starts at the location of the Paul-Emile Durand cottage in the west bordered to the south by the ocean and accessible by the Assinie-Mafia road. Opposite the town of Assinie-Mafia is a narrow peninsula (100–1000 m wide) extending from the west and 15 km long which is occupied by luxury villas and huts. Access is by car, private boats, or canoes across the lagoon.

The mouth of the lagoon which marks the end of the Assinie-Mafia peninsula is called La Passe where the high-rise resort and the smoking of tchoukourou is very popular.

The area is a favourite destination for wealthy inhabitants of Abidjan for the weekend.

Assinie-Mafia was the location of the film French Fried Vacation (Les Bronzés) in 1978.

In 2014, the population of the sub-prefecture of Assinie-Mafia was 16,721.

== Villages ==
The eight villages of the sub-prefecture of Assinie-Mafia and their population in 2014 are:

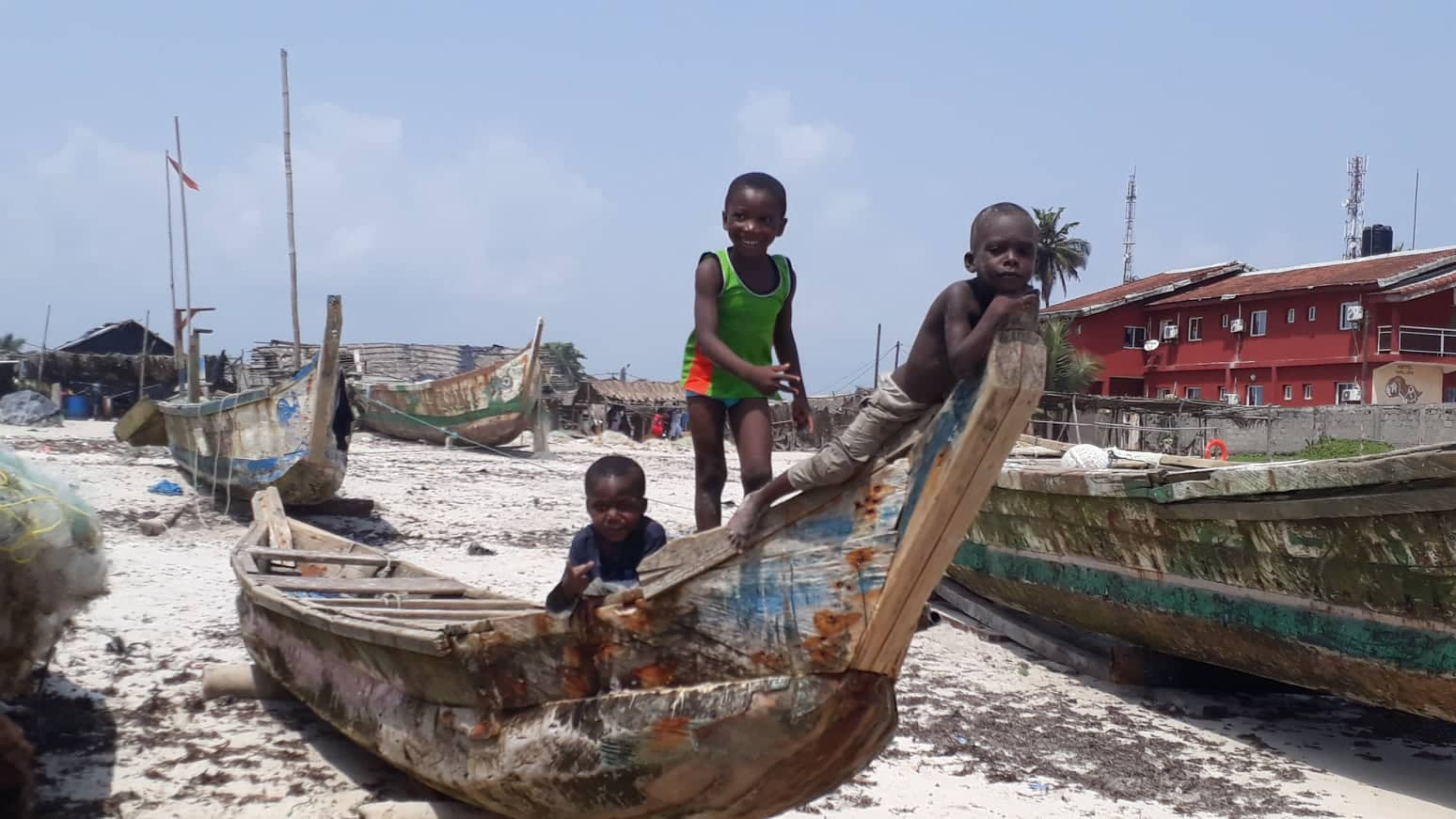
Children playing on the beach of Assouindé.

1. Assinie-France (1,729)
2. Assinie-Mafia (5,661)
3. Assinie-Sagbadou (1,014)
4. Assouindé (5,766)
5. Ebotiam (489)
6. Essankro (595)
7. Mabianéha (841)
8. Mandjian (626)

== History ==
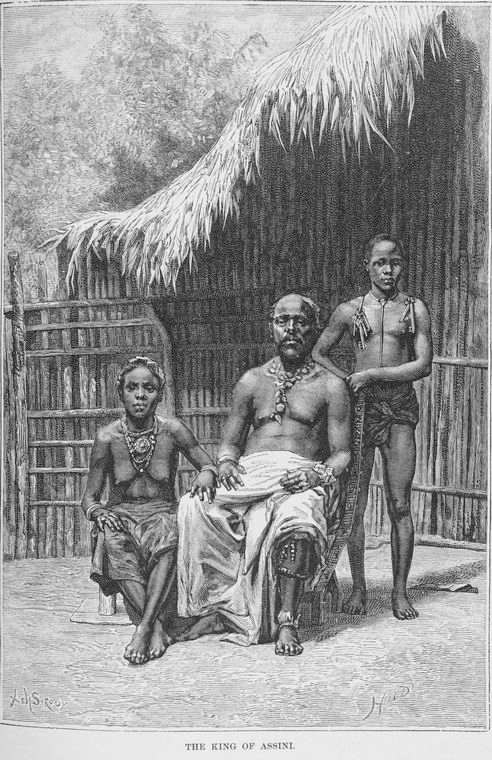
The King of Assinie (by Achille Sirouy) 1890-1893

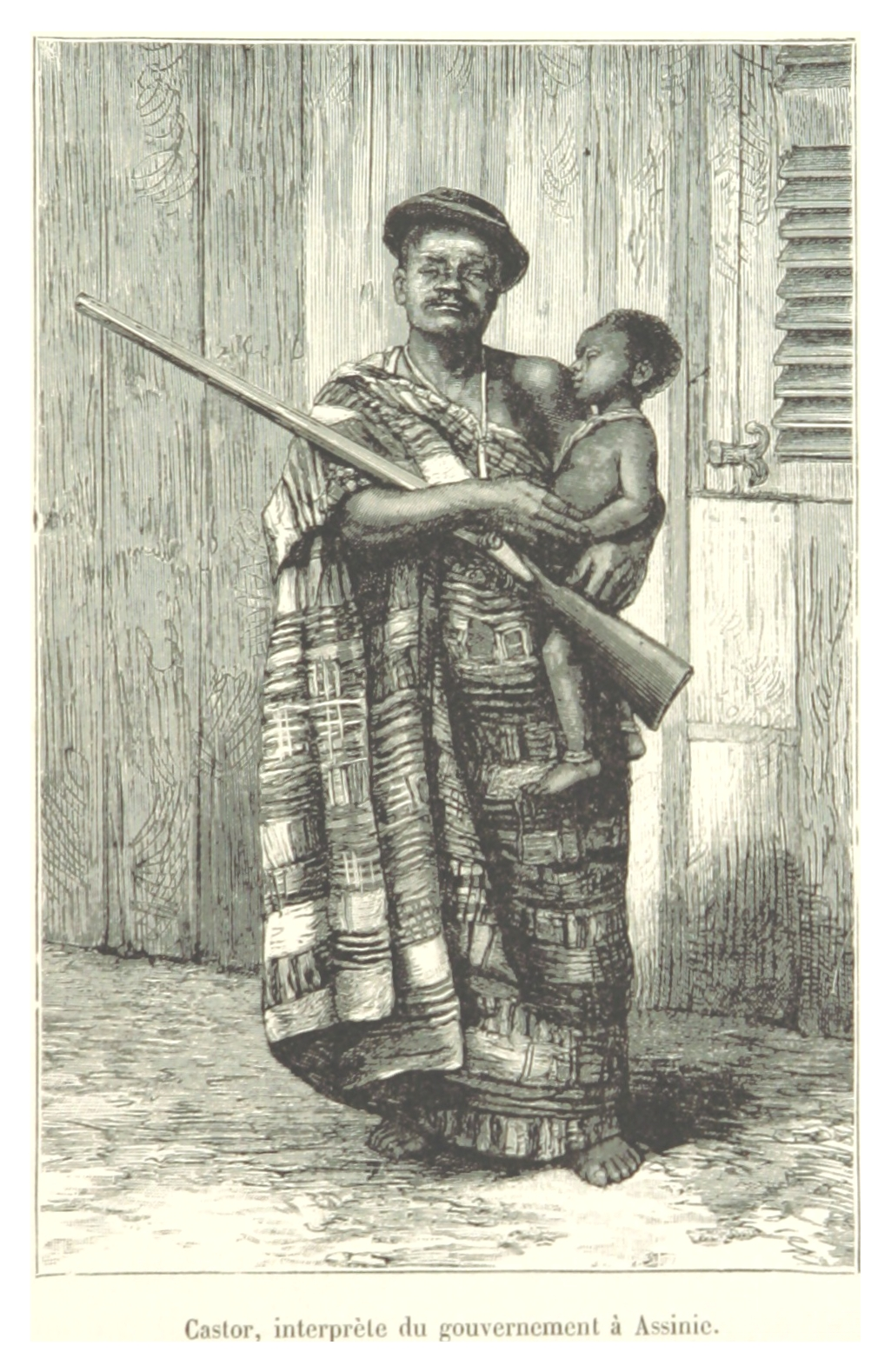
Castor: a government interpreter at Assinie in 1892

Assinie (formerly Issiny) was the first trading post on the Eburnean coast although no vestige of that time remains today. In 1637, five Capuchin missionaries, who came from Saint-Malo, settled there. Climate and sickness caused them to leave quickly and one died there.

=== French Presence in Assinie ===
In 1687, two years after the implementation of the Code noir, missionaries and French traders settled at Assinie at the eastern end of the coast towards the Gold Coast. The Admiral Jean-Baptiste du Casse, director of the Compagnie du Sénégal, instructed the chevalier d'Amon and several Dominicans to establish a settlement with an interest in the region's gold traffic. The French built and occupied Fort Saint-Louis from 1701 to 1704, but left in 1705, because the slave trade did not earn enough as compared to the farming of grain. French priest Godefroy Loyer, who was sent to Assinie in 1701 as an apostolic prefect, published Relation du voyage du Royaume d'Issyny, Côte d'Or, païs de Guinée, en Afrique in 1714 after he returned to France.

D'Amon took two young men from Assinie to France: Aniaba, said to be a prince, and Banga, an interpreter who may also have been Aniaba's cousin. In France, the two were presented to King Louis XIV and converted to Catholicism (Aniaba was baptized by Bossuet, Bishop of Meaux), before returning to Assinie. In 1704, Aniaba became counselor to the King of Quita (now Togo), who called himself Hannibal.

=== Development ===
The first sustainable fort on the Coast after Fort Saint-Louis from 1701 to 1704 was Fort Joinville in Grand-Bassam, which was built there in 1843 after the landing of ship's lieutenants Kerhallet and Fleuriot de Langle which led to a treaty between France and the King of Krindjabo, Amon Ndoufou. At that time skirmishes with the English were frequent and prevented operations in the interior of the country. It is inside these forts that the first trading posts were established in the next few years.

An inspection of the fortified trading post at Assini in 1850 mentioned: "order and cleanliness reign within its walls", the existence of a bastion of masonry (four were originally planned), and the presence of small artillery equivalent to that at Grand-Bassam. "The trading post personnel consist of 40 people, including 5 Europeans, 20 soldiers, and 15 boatmen, coolies, and others and they are in a satisfactory state of health". The men "are in a better place to live [than at Grand-Bassam], where resources are greater because of more frequent intercourse with the natives and are removed from that product of fatigue for the body and sight an existence almost continually passed on moving bleached sand, roasted by a burning sun" The Ivorian postal service began in this locality on 29 July 1843.

The French penetration of the region was counteracted by yellow fever epidemics (in 1857 of 50 Europeans in the three trading posts of Assinie, Grand-Bassam and Dabou, 32 died and 10 were repatriated) and British competition (Victor Régis, pioneer of French trade on this coast since 1843, had to close shop in the early 1860s). However, the first Post Office opened on 17 August 1862.

Arthur Verdier was the first to really bring value to the Assinie region from 1870. The first coffee trees were planted in 1881 and at the same time the cultivation of cocoa started. Logging began in 1885.

=== The decline ===
Assinie was the third largest port in Ivory Coast in 1907 but it quickly lost all commercial and strategic importance in favour of Grand-Bassam, then Bingerville, and finally Port-Bouët/Abidjan.

== Education ==
The first official French school was created at Elima on 8 August 1887 with teacher Fritz-Emile Jeand'heur from Algeria. He had 33 African students who became the first French-language readers. The school ran for three years before being transferred to Assinie-Mafia in 1890 by Marcel Treich-Laplène, the new resident from France.

== Sports ==
Assinie-Mafia has a football club, ASCI d'Assinie, which plays in the regional championship division, equivalent to "4th division". As in most towns in the country, it is informally organized with football tournaments of seven players which are very popular in Ivory Coast and called Maracanas.
