= Kissy Duerré =

Canadian TikToker

- Occupations: Model; Social media influencer Activist
- Modeling information
- Hair color: Black
- Eye color: Brown

TikTok information
- Page: Kissy Duerré
- Years active: 2020 – present
- Followers: 679.1K

Kissy Duerré is a Canadian social media personality, model, and activist.

== Career ==
Duerré joined TikTok in March 2020, shortly after the killing of Breonna Taylor and the widespread actions of the Black Lives Matter movement, where she began creating content about sexism, racism, transphobia, mental health, and her experiences as a Black trans woman. TikTok selected her to be one of their featured creators during their #MakeBlackHistory campaign. By 2021, she gained over 600,000 followers.

== Personal life ==
Duerré lives in Saskatoon, Saskatchewan.
