= Cédric Marshall Kissy =

Ivorian poet

Cédric Marshall Kissy (born in Grand-Bassam, Côte d'Ivoire) is an Ivorian poet who has won several prizes.

== Publications ==
- 2010: Ciel d’Amour, terre de haine, Éditions Edilivre.
- 2011: Tréfonds de cœurs de pierre, Éditions l’Harmattan
- 2012: Tendresse et passion, anthologie des plus beaux poèmes d'amour de la Saint-Valentin
- 2013: La circulation des idées, Le texte vivant
- 2016 : La Mère rouge, Editions Eden (2020, Editions Kamit ; 2025, Editions Papyrus)
- 2018 : La légende du fils de la lumière, Vallesse Editions
- 2021 : Les Larmes de la mer, Vallesse Editions
- 2026 : Mémoire d'aube, JD Editions
