= Woody Cote d'Ivoire =

WOODY Côte d'Ivoire is the main bodybuilding competition in West Africa. Organised by the ABBCI (Association de Bodybuilding de Côte d'Ivoire), it takes place every year at the end of October-beginning of November during the Abissa festival in Grand-Bassam, Côte d'Ivoire.

== Winners ==
- 2005 Abdoulaye Karambiri
- 2006 Alassane Sanogo
- 2007 Seïdou Dao
- 2008 Kofi Salia
