= Arthur Verdier =

French mariner, shipowner, merchant, and pioneer

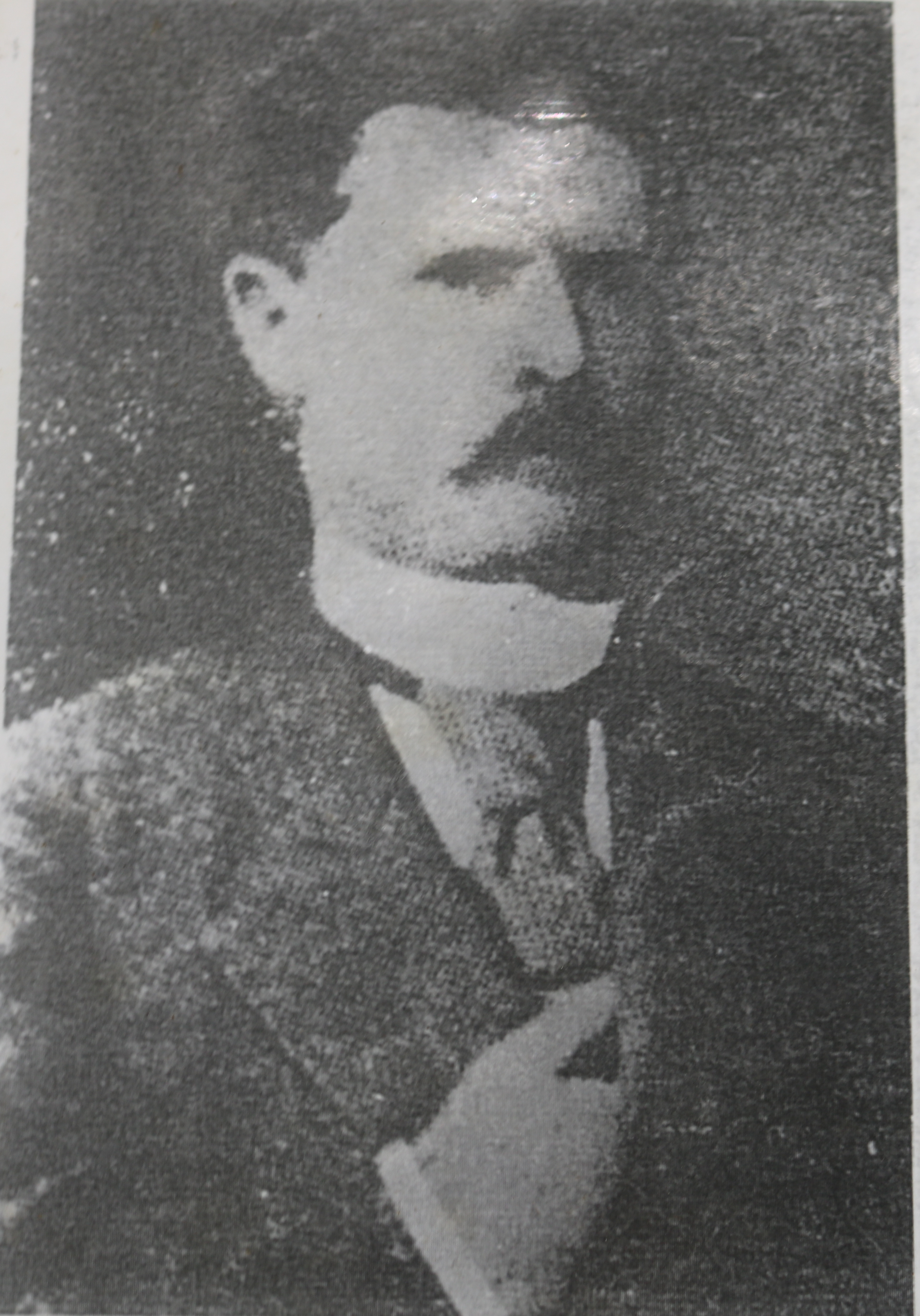
A portrait of Arthur Verdier

Arthur Verdier (1835–1898) was a French mariner, shipowner, merchant and pioneer. From 1871 to 1889, he was the French resident in Grand-Bassam and Assinie, in present-day Côte d'Ivoire. He was an active participant in the development of this region.
