= Louis-Gustave Binger =

French explorer (1856–1936)

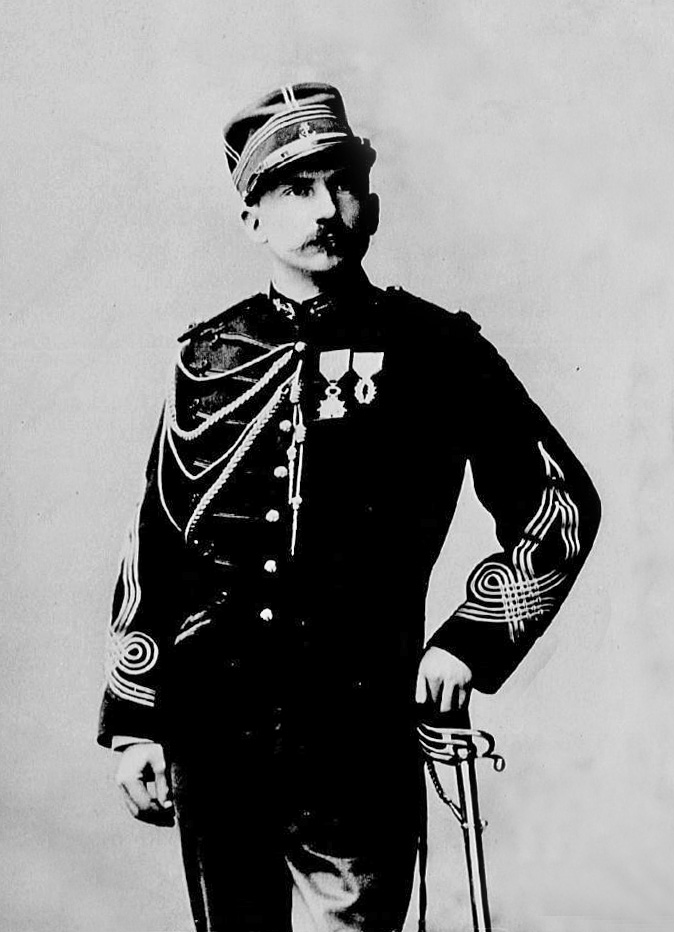
- Born: 14 October 1856; Strasbourg, France
- Died: 10 November 1936 (aged 80); L'Isle-Adam, France

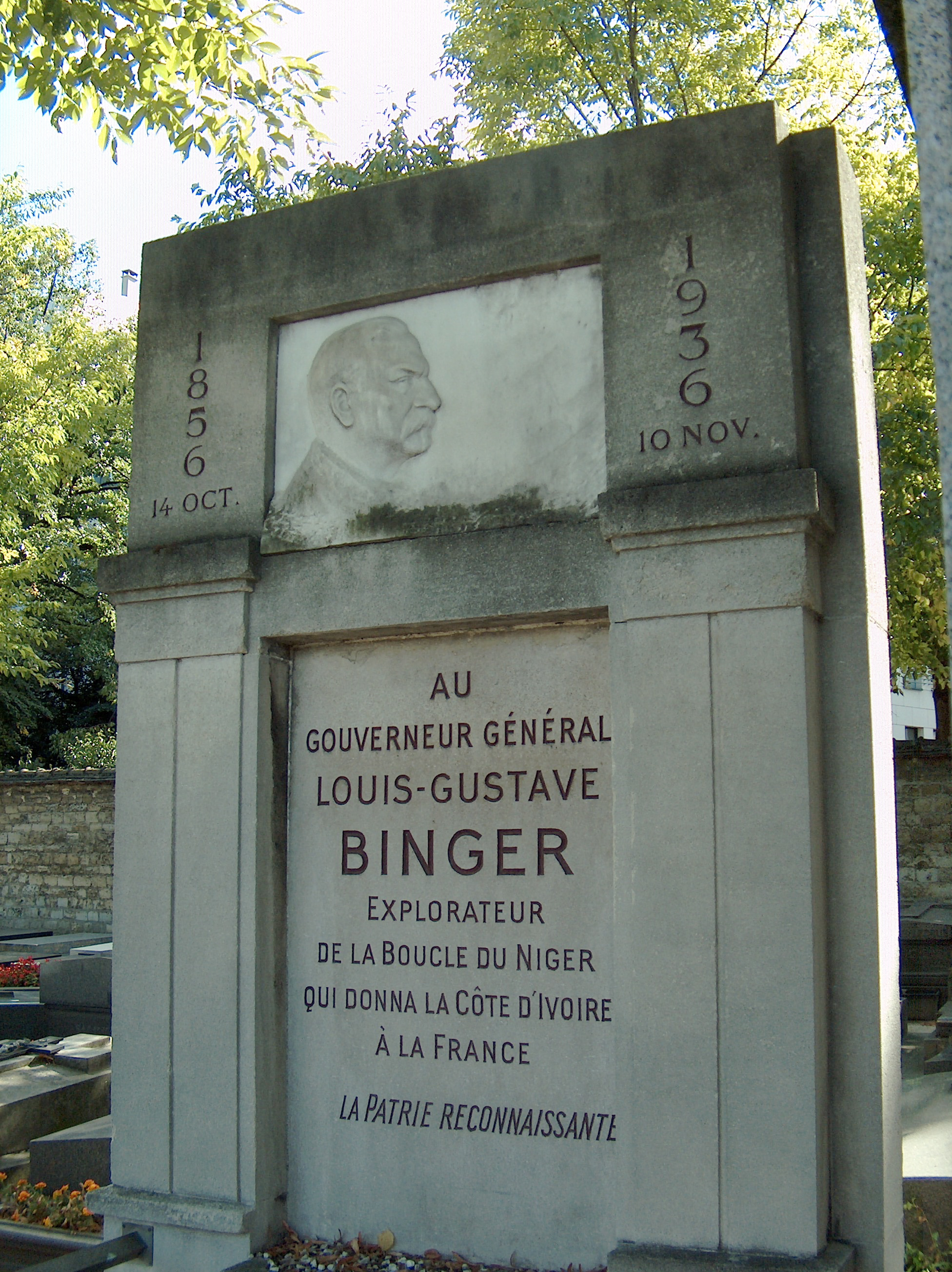
Montparnasse/Paris

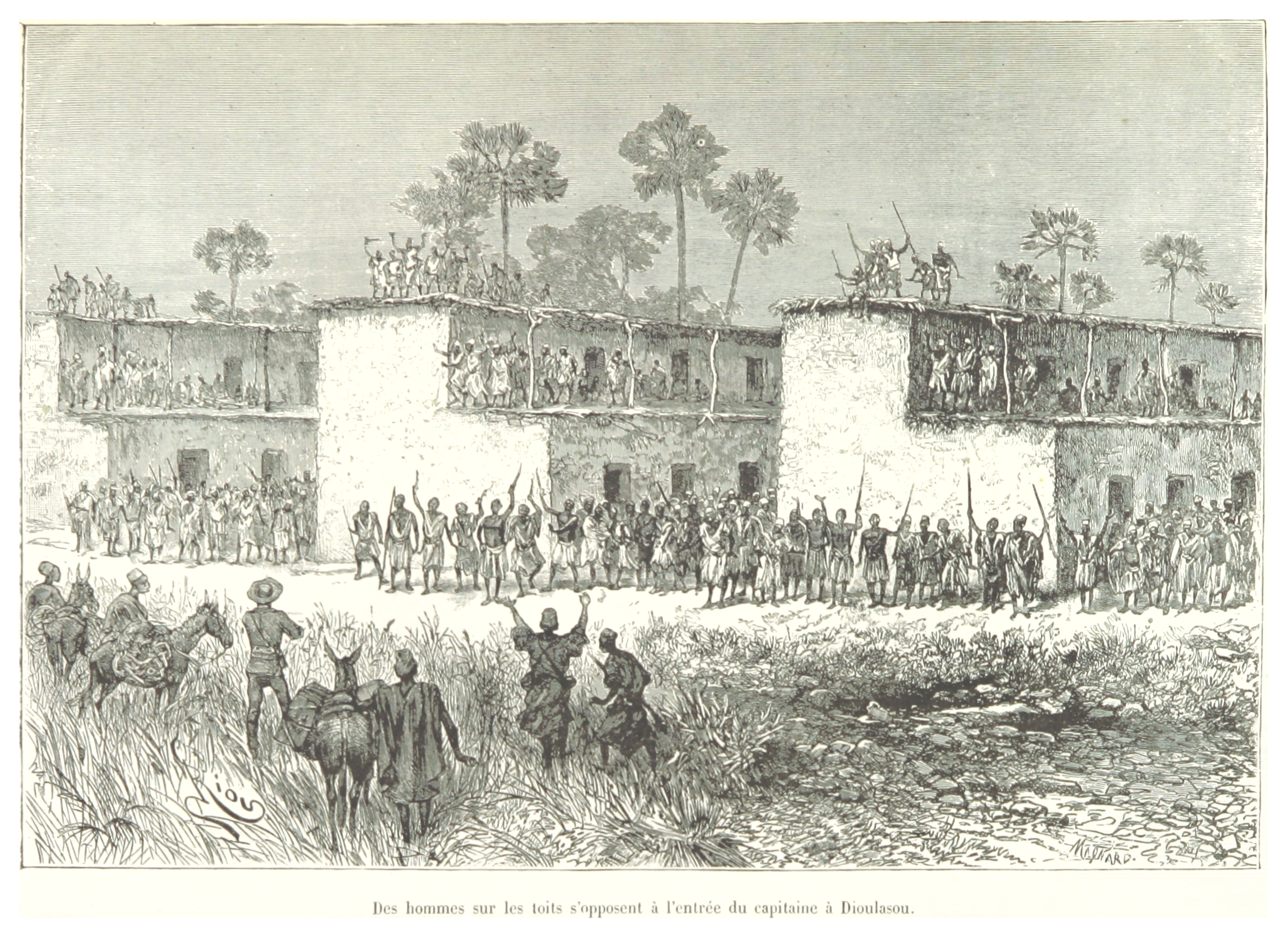
Armed men prevent the French explorer Louis-Gustave Binger from entering Sia (Bobo-Dioulasso) during his stay in April 1892.

Louis-Gustave Binger (French pronunciation: [lwi ɡystav bɛ̃ʒe]; 14 October 1856 – 10 November 1936) was a French officer and explorer who claimed the Côte d'Ivoire for France.

Binger was born at Strasbourg in the Bas-Rhin departement. In 1887 he traveled from Senegal up to the Niger River, arriving at Grand Bassam in 1889. During this expedition he discovered that the Mountains of Kong did not exist. He described this journey in his work Du Niger au golfe de Guinée par le pays de Kong et le Mossi (From the Niger to the Gulf of Guinea though the land of the Kong and the Mossi) (1891).

In 1892 he returned to the Guinea Coast to superintend the forming of the boundaries between the British and French colonies. In 1893 Binger was appointed governor of the Côte d'Ivoire, where he remained until 1898. He returned to France that year, to an administrative post in Paris at the French Colonial Ministry. In 1899 the Royal Geographical Society awarded him their Founder's Medal for his exploratory work.

Louis Gustave Binger died at L'Isle-Adam, Île-de-France, France and was buried in the Cimetière du Montparnasse in Paris. The city of Bingerville in the Ivory Coast is named after him.

== See also ==
- French African Committee
