= Grand-Bassam =

Town in Comoé, Ivory Coast

- Town, sub-prefecture, and commune
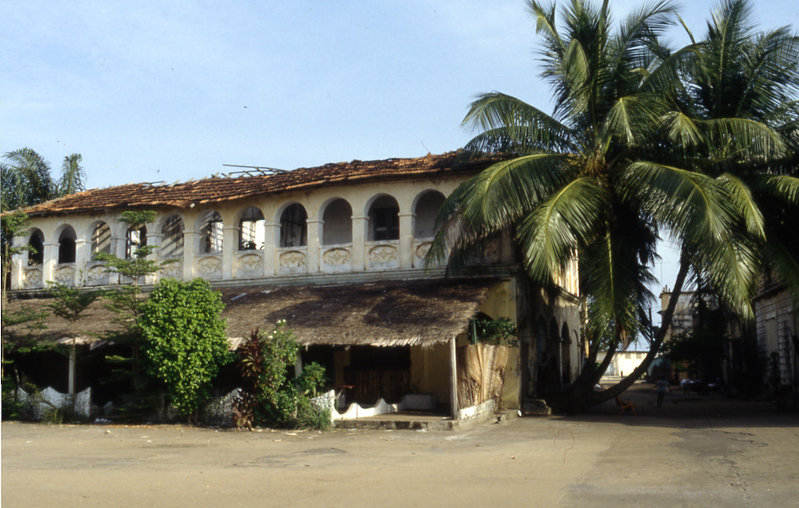
- Colonial house in Grand-Bassam

- Location in Ivory Coast
- Coordinates: 5°12′N 3°44′W
- Country: Ivory Coast
- District: Comoé
- Region: Sud-Comoé
- Department: Grand-Bassam

Area
  - Total: 127 km^{2} (49 sq mi)

Population (2021 census)
  - Total: 124,567
  - Density: 981/km^{2} (2,540/sq mi)
  - Town: 74,671
- (2014 census)
- Time zone: UTC+0 (GMT)

UNESCO World Heritage Site
- Official name: Historic Town of Grand-Bassam
- Criteria: Cultural: (iii), (iv)
- Reference: 1322rev
- Inscription: 2012 (36th Session)
- Area: 109.89 ha (0.4243 sq mi)
- Buffer zone: 552.39 ha (2.1328 sq mi)

Ramsar Wetland
- Official name: Grand Bassam
- Designated: 18 October 2005
- Reference no.: 1583

Grand-Bassam (French pronunciation: [ɡʁɑ̃ basam]) is a town in southeastern Ivory Coast, lying east of Abidjan. It is a sub-prefecture of and the seat of Grand-Bassam Department; it is also a commune. During the late 19th century, Grand-Bassam was briefly the French colonial capital of Ivory Coast. Because of its outstanding examples of colonial architecture and town-planning, and the juxtaposition of the colonial town with a traditional Nzema village, the historic center of Grand-Bassam was designated a UNESCO World Heritage Site in 2012.

In 2021, the population of the sub-prefecture of Grand-Bassam was 124,567.

== Geography ==
The town is divided by the Ébrié Lagoon into two-halves: Ancien Bassam is the former French settlement, facing the Gulf of Guinea. It is home to the grander colonial buildings, some of which have been restored. The district is also home to a cathedral and the Ivory Coast National Museum of Costume, located in the former Governor's Palace. Nouveau Bassam, linked to Ancient Bassam by a bridge, lies on the inland, northern side of the lagoon. It grew from the African servants' quarters and is now the main commercial centre of the town.

The town is the seat of the Roman Catholic Diocese of Grand-Bassam. The diocese's cathedral is the Cathédrale Sacré Cœur in Grand-Bassam.

== History ==
The name Bassam may come from an ancient African word for the mouth of the Comoé River. Inhabited by the Nzema people since the 15th century, the city grew into a profitable fishing village and a trading center. In 1843, after signing a treaty with the African ruler of the Grand-Bassam region, the French built Fort Memours on the banks of the river. This fort became the primary French trading point in the region, and after the Berlin Conference in 1885, became a base for exploration of West Africa by the colonizers. Grand-Bassam became the capital for the French Colonie de Côte d’Ivoire from 1893 until 1900.

In 1899, the colonial administration was transferred to the nearby town, Bingerville, after a devastating outbreak of yellow fever, which decimated the town's population. However, the town remained a key seaport until the growth of Abidjan in the 1930s. The town has the aura of a ghost town, since large sections have been abandoned for decades. In 1960, with independence, all remaining administrative offices were transferred to Abidjan, and for many years Grand-Bassam was inhabited only by squatters. Beginning in the late 1970s, the town began to revive as a tourist destination and craft centre.

In March 2016, the town was targeted in an Islamist mass shooting that perpretated by AQIM, which killed 19 people.

== Sports ==
- Woody Cote d'Ivoire

== Villages ==
The eight villages of the sub-prefecture of Grand-Bassam and their population in 2014 were:

- Azuretti (1.168)
- Ebrah (805)
- Gbamblé (341)
- Grand-Bassam (74.671)
- Modeste (1.981)
- Mondoukou (1.400)
- Vitré 1 (2.482)
- Vitré 2 (1.180)

== Notable people ==
- Cédric Marshall Kissy, poet
- Ediémou Blin Jacob, priest
