= Pogo =

Pogo, PoGo or POGO may refer to:

== Arts, entertainment and media ==
=== Gaming ===
- Philippine Offshore Gaming Operator, any Philippines-based online gambling service
- Pogo.com, a website featuring free online games

=== Music ===
- "Pogo", a song by Digitalism
- Pogo cello, a folk percussion instrument
- Pogo Pops, a pop rock band
- Pogo, an Australian musician

=== Other arts, entertainment and media ===
- Pogo (comic strip), by Walt Kelly, and its title character
- Pogo (dance), a dance style
- Pogo Plane, an airplane in The Fantastic Four comics
- Pogo (TV channel), an Indian satellite and cable television channel
- Phinneus Pogo, a sapient chimpanzee in the comic and TV series The Umbrella Academy

== Organizations ==
- Anarchist Pogo Party of Germany
- Partnership for Observation of the Global Oceans
- Philippine Offshore Gaming Operator
- Project on Government Oversight, US anti-corruption organization
- Pogo Structures, a French boat building company

== People ==
- Ellison Pogo (1947–2013), Archbishop of Melanesia
- Hideki Hosaka (1971–2021), Japanese professional wrestler, briefly known as "Mr. Pogo (II)" in 2017
- Madonna Wayne Gacy (born 1964), musician nicknamed "Pogo"
- Mr. Pogo (Tetsuo Sekigawa, 1951–2017), Japanese professional wrestler
- Pogo (musician) (born 1988), electronic musician
- Pogo the Clown or John Wayne Gacy (1942–1994), American serial killer
- Shadow WX (Satoru Shiga, born 1969), Japanese professional wrestler; adopted the name "Mr. Pogo (III)" in 2021

== Places ==
- Pogo, Alabama, US
- Pogo, Ivory Coast
- Pogo, Mali
- Pogo, Ferkessédougou, Ivory Coast
- POGO (tracking station), Greenland, operated by the US Space Force

== Technology ==
- Bell Pogo, a two-person rocket-powered platform
- Convair XFY Pogo, an experimental aircraft
- Pogo oscillation, a potentially dangerous rocket engine behavior
- PoGo, a mobile printer by Polaroid Corporation
- Pogo pin, a device used in electronics to connect two printed circuit boards

=== Computing ===
- AT&T Pogo, a web browser
- Pogo Mobile and nVoy, a handheld networked device launched in 2000
- Profile-guided optimization (PGO, sometimes pronounced pogo), in computer programming

== Sports and recreation ==
- Pogo stick, a toy used for jumping up and down with the aid of a spring
  - Extreme Pogo, an action sport on specially designed "extreme" pogo sticks
- Pogo ball, a toy similar to a pogo stick, based on a rubber ball

== Other uses ==
- Pogo, a brand of corn dog in some parts of Canada
- Pogo (gorilla), a female gorilla at the San Francisco Zoo, USA
- The Pogo mine is a gold mine in the state of Alaska, USA

== See also ==
- Pogo Joe, a video game
- Pogopalooza, the annual gathering and competition of stunt pogoers
- Bogo (disambiguation)
- PGO (disambiguation)
- Pogoriki, a character in the American children's television series GoGoRiki
