= Korokaha =

- Village
- Location in Ivory Coast
- Coordinates: 9°35′N 5°0′W
- Country: Ivory Coast
- District: Savanes
- Region: Tchologo
- Department: Ferkessédougou
- Sub-prefecture: Togoniéré
- Time zone: UTC+0 (GMT)

Korokaha is a village in northern Ivory Coast. It is in the sub-prefecture of Togoniéré, Ferkessédougou Department, Tchologo Region, Savanes District.

Korokaha was a commune until March 2012, when it became one of 1,126 communes nationwide that were abolished.
