= Tiékpé =

Tiékpé Tiaplé
- Village
- Location in Ivory Coast
- Coordinates: 10°6′N 5°23′W
- Country: Ivory Coast
- District: Savanes
- Region: Tchologo
- Department: Ouangolodougou
- Sub-prefecture: Diawala
- Time zone: UTC+0 (GMT)

Tiékpé (also spelled Tiaplé) is a village in northern Ivory Coast. It is in the sub-prefecture of Diawala, Ouangolodougou Department, Tchologo Region, Savanes District.

Tiékpé was a commune until March 2012, when it became one of 1,126 communes nationwide that were abolished.
