= Nambingué =

- Village
- Location in Ivory Coast
- Coordinates: 10°3′N 5°20′W
- Country: Ivory Coast
- District: Savanes
- Region: Tchologo
- Department: Ouangolodougou
- Sub-prefecture: Ouangolodougou
- Time zone: UTC+0 (GMT)

Nambingué is a village in northern Ivory Coast. It is in the sub-prefecture of Ouangolodougou, Ouangolodougou Department, Tchologo Region, Savanes District.

Nambingué was a commune until March 2012, when it became one of 1,126 communes nationwide that were abolished.
