= Lamékaha, Tchologo =

Lamékaha
- Village
- Location in Ivory Coast
- Coordinates: 9°22′N 5°4′W
- Country: Ivory Coast
- District: Savanes
- Region: Tchologo
- Department: Ferkessédougou
- Sub-prefecture: Koumbala
- Time zone: UTC+0 (GMT)

Lamékaha is the name of three clustered villages in northern Ivory Coast. They are designated Lamékaha 1, Lamékaha 2, and Lamékaha 3. The villages are in the sub-prefecture of Koumbala, Ferkessédougou Department, Tchologo Region, Savanes District.

Lamékaha was a commune until March 2012, when it became one of 1,126 communes nationwide that were abolished.
