= Momirasso =

- Village
- Location in Ivory Coast
- Coordinates: 9°42′N 5°10′W
- Country: Ivory Coast
- District: Savanes
- Region: Tchologo
- Department: Ferkessédougou
- Sub-prefecture: Ferkessédougou
- Time zone: UTC+0 (GMT)

Momirasso is a village in northern Ivory Coast. It is in the sub-prefecture of Ferkessédougou, Ferkessédougou Department, Tchologo Region, Savanes District.

Momirasso was a commune until March 2012, when it became one of 1,126 communes nationwide that were abolished.
