= Pogo, Ivory Coast =

Pogo
- Village
- Location in Ivory Coast
- Coordinates: 10°26′N 5°38′W
- Country: Ivory Coast
- District: Savanes
- Region: Tchologo
- Department: Ouangolodougou
- Sub-prefecture: Toumoukoro
- Elevation: 340 m (1,120 ft)
- Time zone: UTC+0 (GMT)

Pogo is a village in the far north of Ivory Coast. It is in the sub-prefecture of Toumoukoro, Ouangolodougou Department, Tchologo Region, Savanes District. Two kilometres north of the village is a border crossing with Mali.

Pogo was a commune until March 2012, when it became one of 1,126 communes nationwide that were abolished.
