= Pogonissonkaha =

- Village
- Nickname: Pogo
- Location in Ivory Coast
- Coordinates: 9°43′N 5°5′W
- Country: Ivory Coast
- District: Savanes
- Region: Tchologo Region
- Department: Ferkessédougou
- Sub-prefecture: Ferkessédougou
- Time zone: UTC+0 (GMT)

Pogonissonkaha (often shortened to Pogo) is a village in the far north of Ivory Coast. It is in the sub-prefecture of Ferkessédougou, Ferkessédougou Department, Tchologo, Savanes District.

Pogonissonkaha was a commune until March 2012, when it became one of 1,126 communes nationwide that were abolished.
