= Lamékaha =

Lamékaha may refer to:

- Lamékaha, Poro, Savanes District, Ivory Coast
- Lamékaha, Tchologo, Savanes District, Ivory Coast
