= Nafana, Savanes =

Nafana
- Town and sub-prefecture
- Location in Ivory Coast
- Coordinates: 9°12′N 4°47′W
- Country: Ivory Coast
- District: Savanes
- Region: Tchologo
- Department: Kong

Population (2014)
  - Total: 17,703
- Time zone: UTC+0 (GMT)

Nafana is a town in northern Ivory Coast. It is a sub-prefecture of Kong Department in Tchologo Region, Savanes District.

Nafana was a commune until March 2012, when it became one of 1,126 communes nationwide that were abolished.

In 2014, the population of the sub-prefecture of Nafana was 17,703.

== Villages ==
The 12 villages of the sub-prefecture of Nafana and their population in 2014 are:

1. Bassélé (1,993)
2. Dangbadougou (208)
3. Djangala (550)
4. Djédana (3,117)
5. Findélé (1,126)
6. Korhogola (495)
7. Korodiala (1,793)
8. Nafana (2,214)
9. Nyarana (752)
10. Sérikorola (1,214)
11. Sidana (3,440)
12. Touala (801)
