= Sikolo =

- Town and sub-prefecture
- Location in Ivory Coast
- Coordinates: 9°27′N 4°43′W
- Country: Ivory Coast
- District: Savanes
- Region: Tchologo
- Department: Kong

Population (2014)
  - Total: 21,163
- Time zone: UTC+0 (GMT)

Sikolo is a town in northern Ivory Coast. It is a sub-prefecture of Kong Department in Tchologo Region, Savanes District.

The far eastern portion of the sub-prefecture is within the borders of Comoé National Park.

Sikolo was a commune until March 2012, when it became one of 1,126 communes nationwide that were abolished.

In 2014, the population of the sub-prefecture of Sikolo was 21,163.

== Villages ==
The 27 villages of the sub-prefecture of Sikolo and their population in 2014 are:

1. Bassouleymanetogona (174)
2. Bazoumanatogona (216)
3. Borotogona (319)
4. Damahira (620)
5. Gbanassitogona (218)
6. Gbanonon (482)
7. Gboton (489)
8. Irénékoro (1,552)
9. Kafolo Bac (1,405)
10. Kamonokaha (845)
11. Karagboko (780)
12. Kodarasso (253)
13. Koko (435)
14. Koumbala (881)
15. Kourkouna (237)
16. Lawa-Carrefour (572)
17. Linguékoro (2,033)
18. Logota (427)
19. Loronzoba (250)
20. Mapina (937)
21. Nassian (1,161)
22. Sahandala (1,315)
23. Satiguita (394)
24. Sérifesso (121)
25. Sikolo (3,384)
26. Somadougou (268)
27. Tindala (1,395)
