= Bilimono =

Bilimono Bilémona
- Town and sub-prefecture
- Location in Ivory Coast
- Coordinates: 8°55′N 4°9′W
- Country: Ivory Coast
- District: Savanes
- Region: Tchologo
- Department: Kong

Population (2014)
  - Total: 19,873
- Time zone: UTC+0 (GMT)

Bilimono (also spelled Bilémona) is a town in north-eastern Ivory Coast. It is a sub-prefecture of Kong Department in Tchologo Region, Savanes District.

The far northern and eastern portions of the sub-prefecture are within the borders of Comoé National Park.

Bilimono was a commune until March 2012, when it became one of 1,126 communes nationwide that were abolished.

In 2014, the population of the sub-prefecture of Bilimono was 19,873.

== Villages ==
The 15 villages of the sub-prefecture of Bilimono and their population in 2014 are:

1. Bilimono (2,898)
2. Bougou (3,335)
3. Fia (414)
4. Gawy (215)
5. Gorowi (354)
6. Hamaradougou (245)
7. Kalakala (199)
8. Kolon (2,623)
9. Komou (994)
10. Konièhè Kogninnin (1,036)
11. Koron (1,798)
12. Korowita (1,871)
13. Sokolo (960)
14. Toro Kinkéné (1,854)
15. Yondolo (1,077)
