= Kaouara =

- Town and sub-prefecture
- Location in Ivory Coast
- Coordinates: 10°6′N 5°12′W
- Country: Ivory Coast
- District: Savanes
- Region: Tchologo
- Department: Ouangolodougou

Area
  - Total: 649 km^{2} (251 sq mi)

Population (2021 census)
  - Total: 33,558
  - Density: 51.7/km^{2} (134/sq mi)
  - Town: 20,167
- (2014 census)
- Time zone: UTC+0 (GMT)

Kaouara is a town in the far north of Ivory Coast. It is a sub-prefecture of Ouangolodougou Department in Tchologo Region, Savanes District, adjacent to the border with Burkina Faso. A border crossing with Burkina Faso is located 16 kilometres northeast of town.

Kaouara was a commune until March 2012, when it became one of 1,126 communes nationwide that were abolished.

Kaouara is known for its adobe mosque, originally built in the 16th century, which is inscribed on the UNESCO World Heritage List along with other mosques in northern Ivory Coast, as a classic example of Sudano-Sahelian architecture.

In 2021, the population of the sub-prefecture of Kaouara was 33,558.

== Villages ==
The eight villages of the sub-prefecture of Kaouara and their population in 2014 are:

1. Bakombi (1,386)
2. Kadarvogo (1,702)
3. Kaouara (20,167)
4. Katierkpon (301)
5. Laléraba (1,120)
6. Mahandougou (868)
7. Mambiadougou (419)
8. Zanaplédougou (2,008)
