= Ouangolodougou, Ivory Coast =

Ouangolodougou Wangolodougou
- Town, sub-prefecture, and commune
- Location in Ivory Coast
- Coordinates: 9°58′N 5°9′W
- Country: Ivory Coast
- Region: Savanes
- Region: Tchologo
- Department: Ouangolodougou

Area
  - Total: 766 km^{2} (296 sq mi)
- Elevation: 303 m (994 ft)

Population (2021 census)
  - Total: 82,801
  - Density: 108/km^{2} (280/sq mi)
  - Town: 37,991
- (2014 census)
- Time zone: UTC+0 (GMT)

Ouangolodougou (also known as Wangolodougou) is a town in the far north of Ivory Coast, adjacent to the border with Burkina Faso. It is a sub-prefecture of and the seat of Ouangolodougou Department in Tchologo Region, Savanes District. Ouangolodougou is also a commune. In 2021, the population of the sub-prefecture of Ouangolodougou was 82,801.

Ouangolodougou is situated in the sub-Saharan Sahel savanna biogeography region, which is characterised by grasslands with trees.

The town was founded by Sekou Watara in the early 18th century as part of the first wave of expansion of the Kong Empire. The Dioula inhabitants are descended from Watara's men.

The Mosque of Kaouara, a small adobe mosque in the town, possibly dating from the 17th to 19th centuries, was inscribed on the UNESCO World Heritage List in 2021 along with other mosques in the region for its outstanding representation of Sudano-Sahelian architecture.

== Transport ==
The town is served by a station on the Abidjan-Niger Railway.

== Villages ==
The 14 villages of the sub-prefecture of Ouangolodougou and their population in 2014 are:

1. Bénifesso (763)
2. Brahimadougou (4 386)
3. Broundougou (2 335)
4. Niornigué 1 (2 465)
5. Nioronigue 2 (1 947)
6. Ouangolodougou (37 991)
7. Sokourani (1 086)
8. Torla (2 328)
9. Torla-Noumozo (188)
10. Bakarydougou (2 361)
11. Diarratiédougou (1 046)
12. Nambingué (12 865)
13. Pléouo (2 422)
14. Zandanakaha (Gbinzo Ii) (2 336)
