= Kong Department =

Coordinates: 9°9′N 4°37′W

Kong Department Département de Kong
- Department
- Location in Ivory Coast. Kong Department has retained the same boundaries since its creation in 2012.
- Country: Ivory Coast
- District: Savanes
- Region: Tchologo
- 2012: Established via a division of Ferkessédougou Dept
- Departmental seat: Kong

Government
  - Prefect: Mamadou Kamara

Area
  - Total: 8,990 km^{2} (3,470 sq mi)

Population (2021 census)
  - Total: 118,304
  - Density: 13.2/km^{2} (34.1/sq mi)
- Time zone: UTC+0 (GMT)

Kong Department is a department of Tchologo Region in Savanes District, Ivory Coast. In 2021, its population was 118,304 and its seat is the settlement of Kong. The sub-prefectures of the department are Bilimono, Kong, Nafana, and Sikolo. The eastern edge of the department extends into Comoé National Park.

== History ==
Kong Department was created in 2012 by dividing Ferkessédougou Department.
