= Diawala =

- Town, sub-prefecture, and commune
- Location in Ivory Coast
- Coordinates: 10°7′N 5°28′W
- Country: Ivory Coast
- District: Savanes
- Region: Tchologo
- Department: Ouangolodougou

Area
  - Total: 1,820 km^{2} (700 sq mi)

Population (2021 census)
  - Total: 85,334
  - Density: 46.9/km^{2} (121/sq mi)
  - Town: 20,216
- (2014 census)
- Time zone: UTC+0 (GMT)

Diawala is a town in the far north of Ivory Coast. It is a sub-prefecture and commune of Ouangolodougou Department in Tchologo Region, Savanes District.

Diawala is the birthplace of Guillaume Soro.

In 2021, the population of the sub-prefecture of Diawala was 85,334.

== Villages ==
The 17 villages of the sub-prefecture of Diawala and their population in 2014 are:

1. Diawala (20 216)
2. Lofélé (2 839)
3. Natogo (923)
4. Sononi (2 163)
5. Sordi (1 552)
6. Tiaplé (3 221)
7. Djélisso (6 230)
8. Fodonkaha (35)
9. Fondonokaha (4 456)
10. Kapékaha (2 716)
11. Kassiongokoura (3 091)
12. Katonon (3 576)
13. Kofiplé (2 718)
14. Korokara (8 308)
15. Lonzo (2 472)
16. Nafoungolo (5 169)
17. Sinakaha (1 369)
