= Togoniéré =

- Town and sub-prefecture
- Location in Ivory Coast
- Coordinates: 9°30′N 5°4′W
- Country: Ivory Coast
- District: Savanes
- Region: Tchologo
- Department: Ferkessédougou

Population (2014)
  - Total: 13,025
- Time zone: UTC+0 (GMT)

Togoniéré is a town in northern Ivory Coast. It is a sub-prefecture of Ferkessédougou Department in Tchologo Region, Savanes District.

Togoniéré was a commune until March 2012, when it became one of 1,126 communes nationwide that were abolished.

In 2014, the population of the sub-prefecture of Togoniéré was 13,025.

== Villages ==
The 16 villages of the sub-prefecture of Togoniéré and their population in 2014 are:

1. Diembala 1 (383)
2. Diembala 2 (736)
3. Diéwarakaha (387)
4. Djélébélé (1,321)
5. Djéyénin (418)
6. Djo (449)
7. Gbamga (1,001)
8. Kakono (349)
9. Kalakala (2,269)
10. Korkana (691)
11. Kroukrosso (852)
12. Miliminin (322)
13. Séfognékaha (923)
14. Togoniéré (1,820)
15. Touala 1 (299)
16. Touala 2 (805)
