= Seku Watara =

Founder of the Kong Empire

- Fagama
- Reign: c. 1710-1745
- Predecessor: Position established
- Successor: Samandougou
- Born: Aboudoudou Kadal Watara c. 1670; Kong, Ivory Coast
- Died: c. 1745; Kong, Ivory Coast
- War House: Watara
- Father: Tieba Watara

Seku Watara (also spelled Sekou Ouattara or Wattara) was the founder and first king of the Kong Empire.

== Early life ==
Aboudoudou Kadal Watara was born the son of Dioula traders either in the Sumakhana neighborhood of Kong or the nearby village of Ténenguéra or Tenegala. Educated in Arabic, he was given the sobriquet seku meaning cheikh. He eventually became one of the richest merchants of the region. By collaborating with the leader of Gonja for an assault on Bouna in 1709, he gained a massive windfall in gold, slaves, and firearms, helping to launch his political ambitions.

There are conflicting stories telling how Seku came to power in Kong, by defeating the native Fallafala (a branch of the Senufo people) in battle, or by sneaking into town during a market day and overthrowing the chief, Lasiri Gbambele. Gbambele and Seku were related, but there was significant discord as a result of a dispute between Lasiri and Seku's father over the woman who became Seku's mother. This oral tradition claims that in 1710 Lasiri suppressed Islam in Kong and embraced the Nyama-Kurugu cult. Seku, meanwhile, funded and led a coalition of clerics and local leaders to resist Gbambele. When Lasiri expelled a Muslim cleric from Kong, Seku brought together his forces to seize the town, executing Lasiri.

== Reign ==
After establishing control over Kong, forces under Seku and allied leaders with their own war houses expanded north to the Black Volta and south to Boule, focusing on controlling and defending the critical trade routes linking the region to the great trading cities of the Niger River valley and ultimately desert-side markets. Seku himself pushed north across the Leraba River, conquering the Tiefo people among others. He eventually reached Sya, where the local Bobo people requested his help against their rebellious vassals. Seku left one of his sons in charge of the region and returned to Kong. This was a widespread strategy to cement the family's control over crucial settlements. His son Kere-Mori and brother Famagan Watara were critical in securing Kong's power in the Mouhoun River bend.

In the south, Seku's forces ran into the growing Ashanti Empire. The resulting conflict was a stalemate, leaving Ashanti in control of Gyaaman, but recognizing Kong's independence.

== Death and legacy ==
Seku died around 1745. A son took power in Kong but, as a younger relative to experienced and established warlords such as Famagan, could not assert his authority over the entire Watara War House.

Seku is the ancestor of current Ivorian president Alassane Ouattara.
