= Koumbala =

- Town, sub-prefecture, and commune
- Location in Ivory Coast
- Coordinates: 9°31′N 5°10′W
- Country: Ivory Coast
- District: Savanes
- Region: Tchologo
- Department: Ferkessédougou
- Elevation: 325 m (1,066 ft)

Population (2014)
  - Total: 10,088
- Time zone: UTC+0 (GMT)

Koumbala is a town in northern Ivory Coast. It is a sub-prefecture and commune of Ferkessédougou Department in Tchologo Region, Savanes District.

In 2014, the population of the sub-prefecture of Koumbala was 10,088.

== Villages ==
The 15 villages of the sub-prefecture of Koumbala and their population in 2014 are:

1. Djongonkaha (1 027)
2. Koumbala (1 712)
3. Koutcho (317)
4. Nambékaha (380)
5. Djongo (407)
6. Djongonokaha (760)
7. Gbané (597)
8. Kiniékaha (900)
9. Laméhaka 1 (381)
10. Laméhaka 2 (599)
11. Laméhaka 3 (1 251)
12. Sambakaha (651)
13. Tikissikaha 1 (166)
14. Tikissikaha 2 (133)
15. Yédjadékaha (807)
