= Ferkessédougou =

- City, sub-prefecture, and commune
- Nickname: Ferké
- Location in Ivory Coast
- Coordinates: 9°35′N 5°12′W
- Country: Ivory Coast
- District: Savanes
- Region: Tchologo
- Department: Ferkessédougou

Area
  - Total: 2,200 km^{2} (850 sq mi)
- Elevation: 316 m (1,037 ft)

Population (2021 census)
  - Total: 160,267
  - Density: 73/km^{2} (190/sq mi)
  - City: 55,910
- (2014 census)
- Time zone: UTC+0 (GMT)

Ferkessédougou (often shortened to Ferké) is a city in northern Ivory Coast. It is a sub-prefecture of and the seat of Ferkessédougou Department. It is also the seat of Tchologo Region in Savanes District and a commune. Ferkessédougou is the second-most populous city in northern Ivory Coast, after Korhogo.

== Regional center ==
Ferkessédougou is an important centre of local development as the nearest large town on the north–south road to the main border posts for crossing into Burkina Faso and Mali. A major transport crossroads, it is home to a regional market, schools, and a hospital.

== Local economy ==
The economy of the Ferkessédougou area is overwhelmingly agricultural, with larger scale commercial farming based on huge cotton and sugarcane plantations. The city is a centre for the processing of these commodities, in particular for cattle feed, as it is a centre for stockyards of herds of zebu cattle, driven from the north, and bound for markets further south. A burgeoning tourist industry is based upon Ferkessédougou's proximity to the large Comoé National Park (to the east) and Mount Nimba Strict Nature Reserve (to the west).

== Population and culture ==
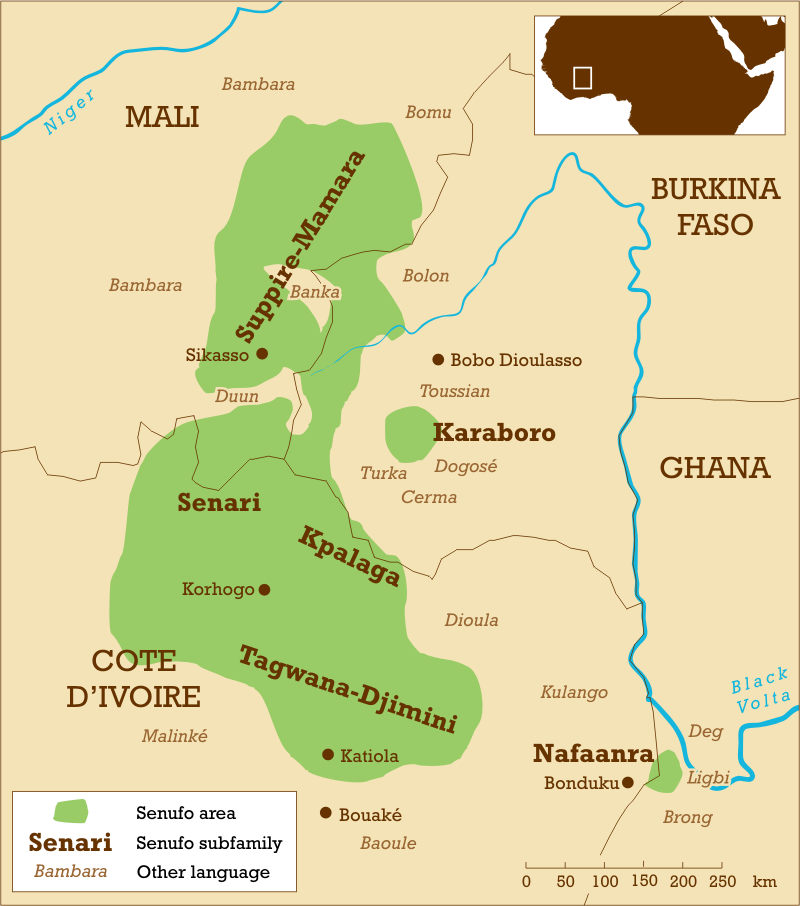
Map of Senufo languages groups: see especially the Senari subgroup.

The dominant ethnic group in the area are the Sénoufo (primarily of Nyarafolo and Kpalaga/Palaka dialect speakers). Sociocultural organization is based on the "Poro", an educational system through which every male adolescent graduates to adulthood. In the 2021 census, the population of the sub-prefecture of Ferkessédougou was 160,267.

== History ==
Ferkessédougou is situated in the heartland of the Senufo people, who migrated from the north at the time of the Mali Empire. The Senufo followed traditional African faiths, while many of the Mandinka people were becoming fervent Muslims. The Senufo were soon followed by the Dioula or Jula, a Mandinka merchant class prominent throughout West Africa. The Dioula, as they are called in Ivory Coast, reached the area and settled the nearby city of Kong in the 12th century. Despite being outnumbered by the Senufo, they prospered as traders and advisors in much of the region. In the 18th century, the Kong Empire to the east became a major regional power and dominated the Ferkessédougou area.

The town of Ferkessédougou was founded in the 19th century by Ferkessé, a Niarafola leader pushed to the west by the expansion of the Kong Empire. The name is a contraction of Ferkessés - dougou ("Village" in Bambara).

At the end of the 19th century, the area fell under the control of first Samory Touré's Wassoulou Empire and the French colonial empire. Placed under the Côte d'Ivoire Colony of French West Africa in 1895, the completed section of the planned Abidjan-Niger Railway was constructed north and ended during the colonial period at Ferkessédougou town, lending it increased regional importance. The French introduced large-scale cotton production, which remains an important pillar of the local economy.

In the late 1970s, Ferkessédougou was designated by the government as one of their regional development hubs for industry processing agricultural goods. A 50,000 ton capacity sugar processing plant was built in this period.

== Climate ==
On the southern edge of the Sahel—tropical Savanna belt, Ferkessédougou gets a mean annual rainfall of 1400 mm, making it drier than much of Côte d'Ivoire. It is 1037 ft-316 m in elevation.

Climate data for Ferkessédougou
| Month | Jan | Feb | Mar | Apr | May | Jun | Jul | Aug | Sep | Oct | Nov | Dec | Year |
|---|---|---|---|---|---|---|---|---|---|---|---|---|---|
| Mean daily maximum °C (°F) | 33 (92) | 34 (94) | 34 (94) | 34 (93) | 33 (92) | 31 (88) | 29 (85) | 28 (83) | 29 (85) | 31 (88) | 33 (91) | 33 (91) | 32 (90) |
| Mean daily minimum °C (°F) | 16 (61) | 19 (67) | 23 (74) | 23 (74) | 23 (73) | 22 (71) | 21 (70) | 21 (70) | 21 (69) | 21 (69) | 19 (67) | 17 (63) | 21 (69) |
| Average precipitation mm (inches) | 5.1 (0.2) | 23 (0.9) | 48 (1.9) | 81 (3.2) | 150 (5.9) | 150 (5.8) | 190 (7.5) | 310 (12.1) | 240 (9.5) | 120 (4.6) | 33 (1.3) | 10 (0.4) | 1,360 (53.4) |
Source: Weatherbase

== Transport ==
Ferkessédougou is served by Ferkessédougou Airport and a station on the national railway system.

=== Airport ===
Ferkessedougou Airport (IATA: FEK; ICAO: DIFK; 9.60000°N 5.20000°W) is an airport serving Ferkessedougou.

== Villages ==
The 41 villages of the sub-prefecture of Ferkessédougou and their population in 2014 are.

1. Fangakaha (193)
2. Ferkessédougou (55 910)
3. Katikaha (289)
4. Parawalakaha (1 048)
5. Tiébinguékaha (1 161)
6. Dékokaha (1 263)
7. Détikaha (1 447)
8. Diologokaha (258)
9. Donkaha (91)
10. Fandérékaha (830)
11. Fononkaha (269)
12. Houphouetkaha (286)
13. Kakpéliakaha (673)
14. Kitienkaha Ou Kitanedou (480)
15. Korobélékaha (137)
16. Koussorokaha (1 427)
17. Lafilé (660)
18. Lafokpokaha (2 886)
19. Lassologo (4 469)
20. Momirasso (8 047)
21. Nagawokaha (30)
22. Nambonkaha (3 862)
23. Namgirguékaha (427)
24. Naniékaha (2 293)
25. Pissankaha (340)
26. Poulo (2 154)
27. Sépénédjokaha (4 703)
28. Sodepra Village (52)
29. Sodesucre Village C (7 663)
30. Sokoro 1 (867)
31. Sokoro 2 (1 062)
32. Solkaha (18)
33. Tchassanankaha 1 (875)
34. Tchassanankaha 2 (1 211)
35. Tchologokaha (84)
36. Tiékpé (7 786)
37. Village Cadres Sodesucre (167)
38. Village Sodesucre A (832)
39. Village Sodesucre B (1 653)
40. Village-Sodefel (1 291)
41. Worossontiakaha (956)
