= PGO =

PGO may refer to:

== Science and technology ==
- Phenylglyoxylic acid, a chemical
- Ponto-geniculo-occipital waves, found in the thalamus during REM sleep
- Profile-guided optimization, a computer compiler technique
- Pokémon Go, a mobile video game sometimes abbreviated as "PGo"

== Transport ==
- PGO (Automobile), a French car manufacturer
- PGO Scooters, a Taiwanese motor scooter brand of Motive Power Industry
- Stevens Field (IATA code), an airport in Archuleta County, Colorado, United States

== Other uses ==
- Persian Gulf Online Organization, a non-governmental organization
- The Association of Professional Geoscientists of Ontario

== See also ==
- Pogo (disambiguation)
