= Kong, Ivory Coast =

Kong Kpon
- Town, sub-prefecture, and commune
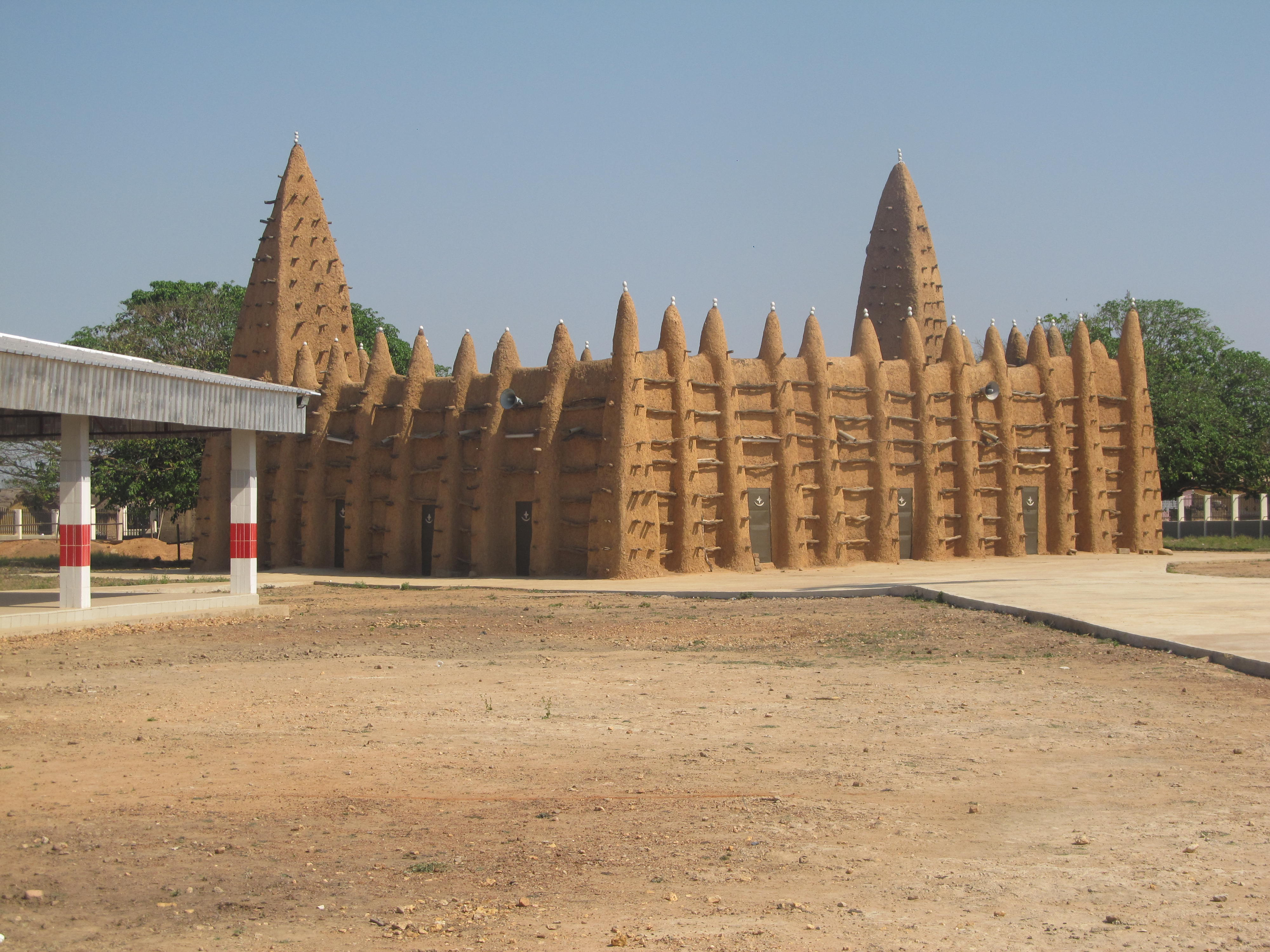
- Traditional mosque architecture in Kong, in the regional Sudano-Sahelian style.

- Location in Ivory Coast
- Coordinates: 9°9′N 4°37′W
- Country: Ivory Coast
- District: Savanes
- Region: Tchologo
- Department: Kong

Government
  - Mayor: Berte Aboudramane Tiemoko
- Elevation: 328 m (1,076 ft)

Population (2021 census)
  - Total: 33,391
  - Town: 11,774
- (2014 census)
- Time zone: UTC+0 (GMT)

Kong, also known as Kpon, is a town in northern Ivory Coast. It is a sub-prefecture of and the seat of Kong Department in Tchologo Region, Savanes District. Kong is also a commune. It was the capital of the Kong Empire (1710–1895).

== History ==
=== Early history ===
The date of the founding of Kong is unknown, but it began as a small chiefdom inhabited by the Fallafala, a branch of the Senufo people.

Starting in the 14th century Mandé merchants of Soninke Wangara heritage, known as the Dyula, migrated south from the Mali Empire. The Ouattara, Daou, Barou, Kérou and Touré clans came from the area around Segou and Djenne, while the Sissé, Sakha, Kamata, Daniokho, Kouroubari, Timité, and Traouré came from Tengréla. The town was islamized by the 16th century. In the late 17th century, the chiefdom was under the control of Lassiri Gombele.

=== Kong Empire ===
In 1710, Seku Ouattara (Wattara) united the Dioula and overthrew Gombele. He established himself as ruler and, under his authority, the city rose from a small city-state to the capital of the Kong Empire. It held sway over much of the region for over 150 years. In the mid 18th century Kong was attacked by the Ashanti Empire, but repelled the invasion. Kings usually lived in small towns outside of Kong itself.

=== 19th century ===
Louis-Gustave Binger passed through Kong in 1888, and was greeted relatively warmly. Jean-Baptiste Marchand followed him in 1893, but received a notably cooler reception.

In the early 1890s Samory Touré, faama of the expanding Samorian Empire, set his sights on conquering Kong. The French, by that point the dominant power in the coastal region to the south, sought to secure the city by putting together a column led by Col. Monteil in August 1894, but it did not leave Grand Bassam, however, until February 1895. Its passage sparked a popular resistance movement. Monteil fought a battle with Wassoulonke forces on the 14th, and the French were forced to retreat and abandon Kong, which pledged fealty to Samory in April.

Toure accorded the city numerous privileges, but the local merchants' commerce with the coast, dominated by the French, slowed with their absorption into the Wassoulou empire. When Samory, looking to push further east into the Gold Coast to secure new sources of guns, retreated rather than fight a French force he encountered, they sought to take advantage of his weakness by intercepting arms caravans and opening channels to invite the French back. When the discontent eventually broke into open revolt, Samory destroyed the city on May 23, 1897.

In January 1898, a French force under Lt. Demars occupied Kong to forestall a rumored British advance from the Gold Coast. By February 14th, his small contingent was besieged in a redoubt southeast of the town by a force of 3000 sofas under Samory's son Saranké-Mory. They survived multiple assaults, and 26 soldiers died of thirst before a relief column arrived from the north on February 27th.

=== 20th Century ===
The wars of the 1890s left Kong completely devastated - the population fell from approximately 15000 in 1888 to 600 in 1901, but gradually recovered in the following decades. The local elders refused to allow the construction of a railway in the 1920s, and the town became increasingly economically marginalized.

Gaoussou Ouattara (1995-2013) and Téné Birahima Ouattara (2013-2018), descendants of Seku Watara and brothers of Ivorian president Alassane Ouattara, have served as mayor. Ouattara and his party Rally of the Republicans dominate the political life of the town.

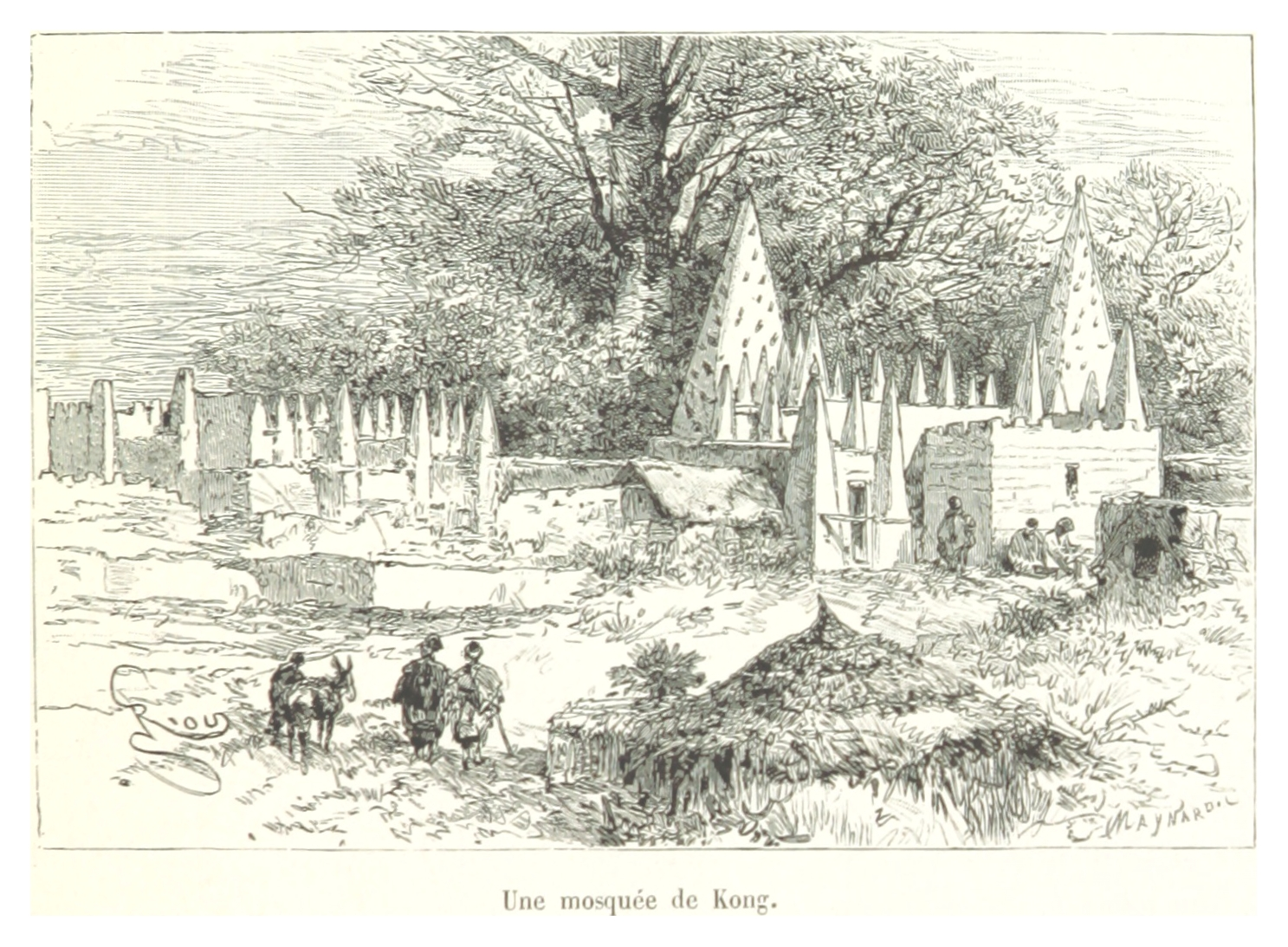
A mosque in Kong, 1892.

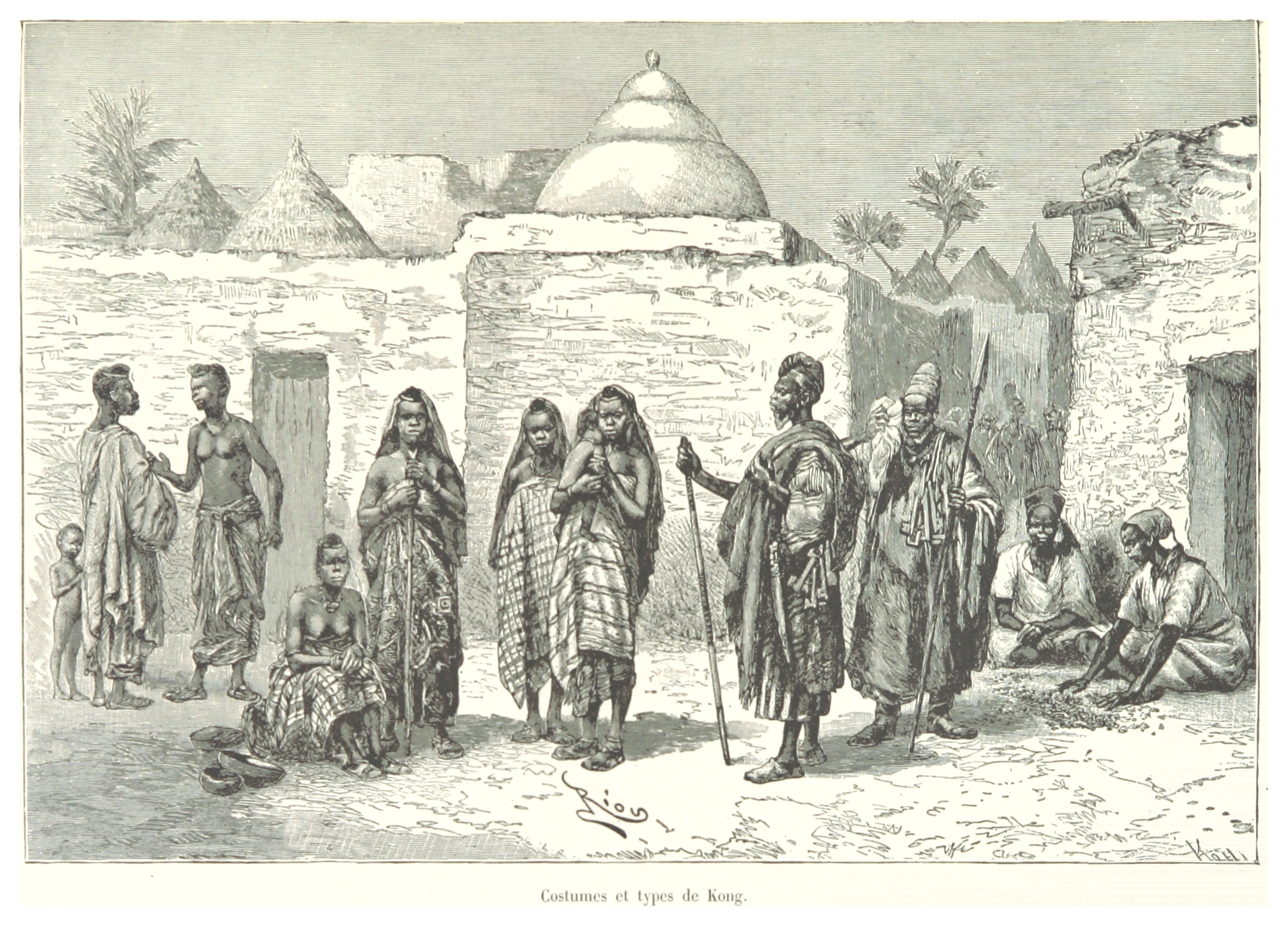
People and costume of Kong, 1892.

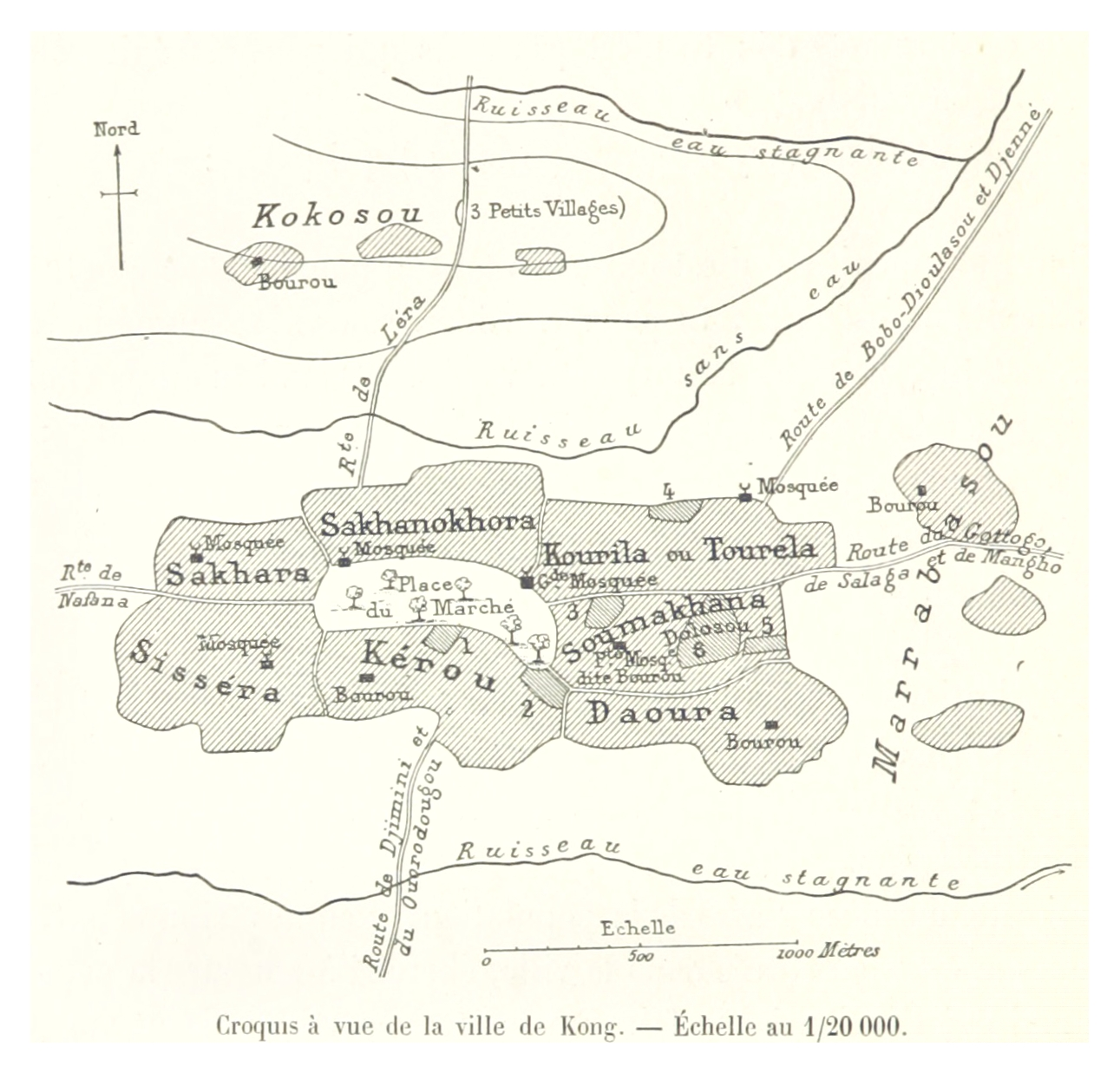
Map of Kong, 1892.

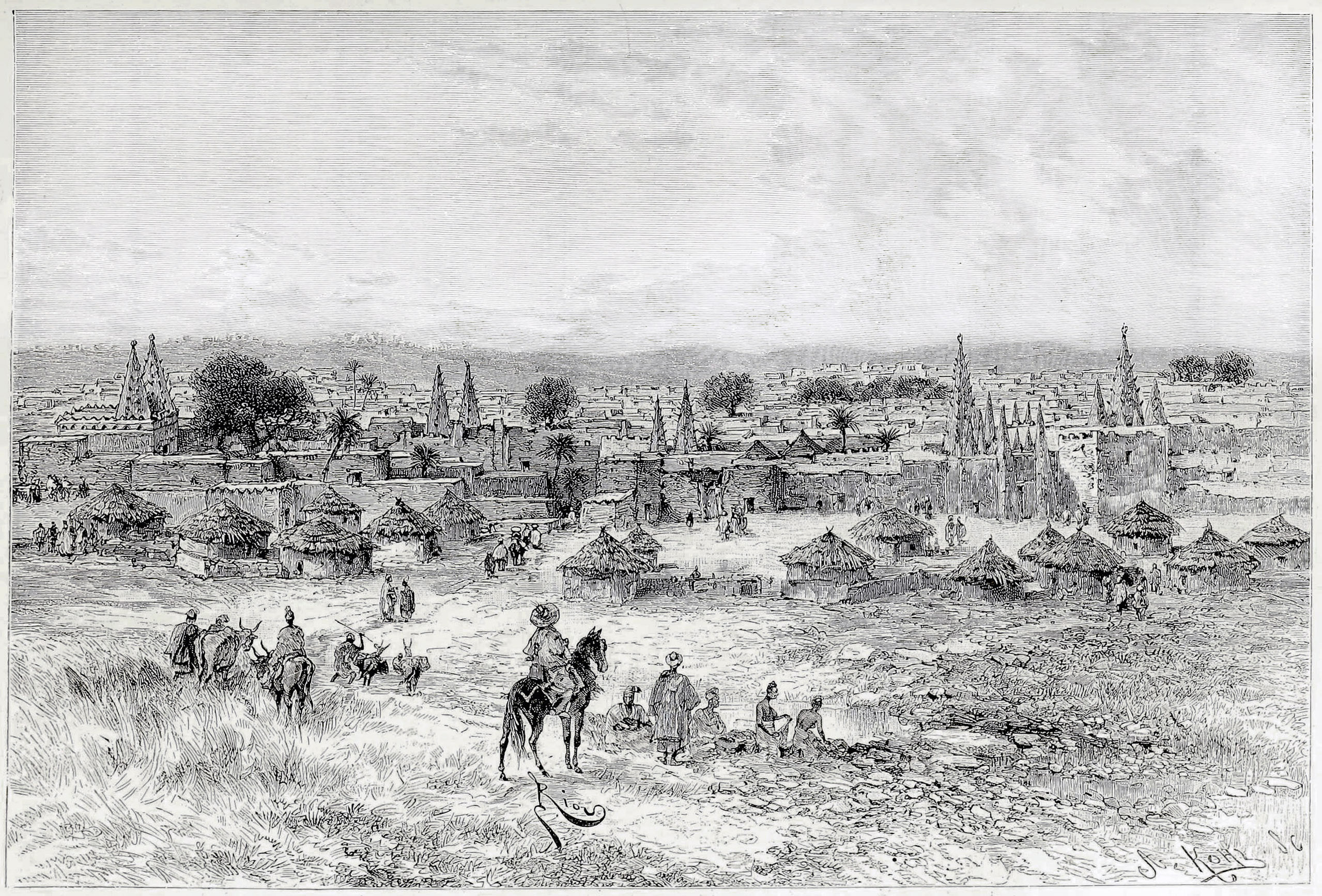
View of Kong.

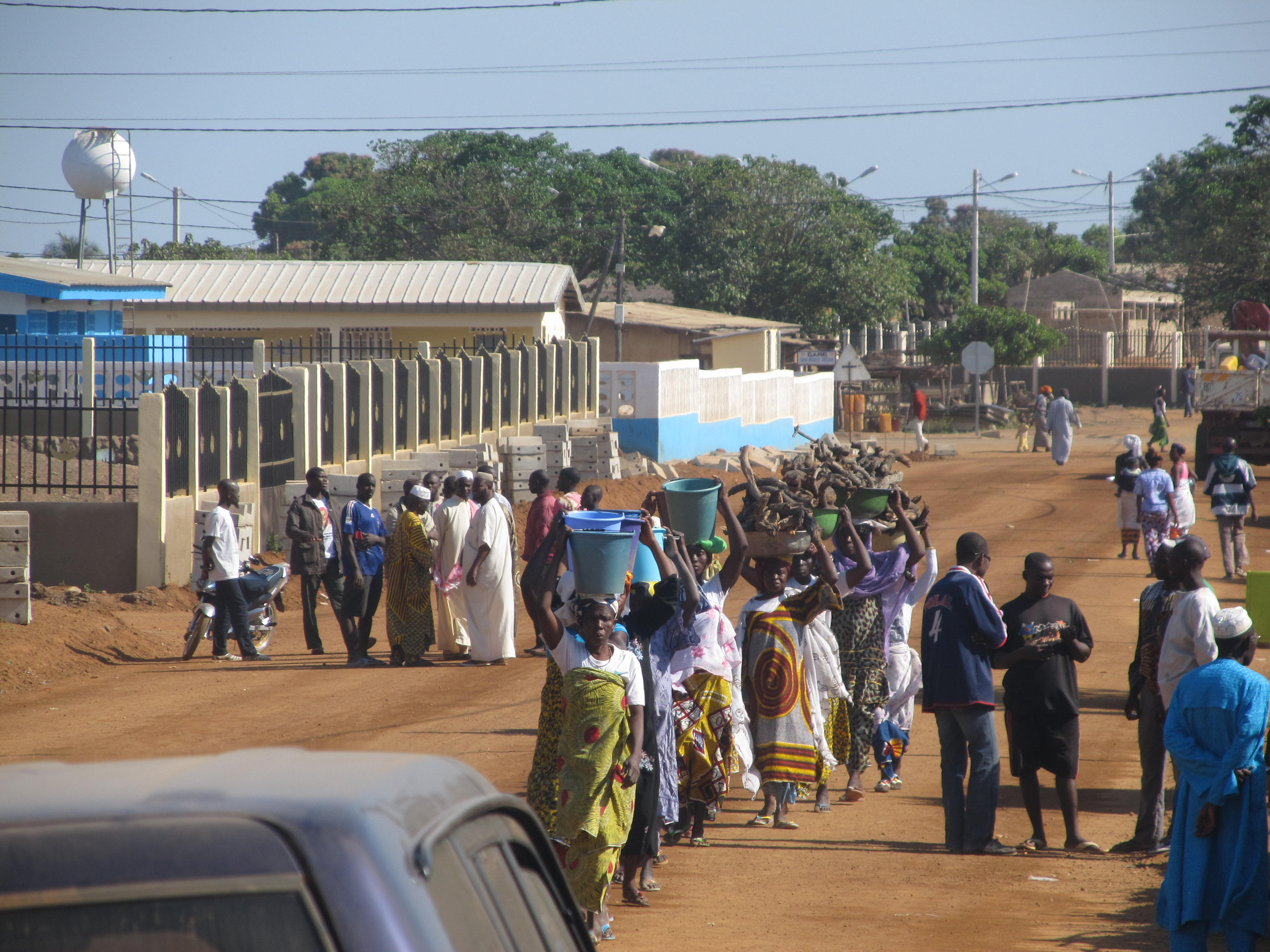
A funeral in modern-day Kong

== Natural history ==
Kong is in the sub-Saharan Sahel–tropical Savanna belt biogeography region, of grasslands with trees, such as the baobab (Adansonia digitata), shea (Vitellaria paradoxa) and other species.

== Features ==
Despite the Kong Empire's fall from power, the 17th century Kong Friday Mosque survived. In the 20th century, it was largely rebuilt in a traditional adobe earthen Sudano-Sahelian architecture style. It features a Qur'anic school and distinctive baked mud mosque buildings. The Grand Mosque of Kong and another, smaller mosque within the city, together with six other mosques in northern Côte d'Ivoire, were inscribed on the UNESCO World Heritage List because of their traditional architectural style.

The far north-eastern portion of the sub-prefecture is within the borders of Comoé National Park.

In 2014, the population of the sub-prefecture of Kong was 29,190.

== Villages ==
The 18 villages of the sub-prefecture of Kong and their population in 2014 are:

1. Djangbanasso (5 462)
2. Kobada (1 323)
3. Kong (11 774)
4. Manogota (2 397)
5. Djégnéné (964)
6. Fassélémou (1 677)
7. Kongodjan (173)
8. Kongolo Sobara (283)
9. Kongolo Tolo (1 543)
10. Koundou (159)
11. Limonon (432)
12. Loronzo (166)
13. Niangbakala (343)
14. Paraka (565)
15. Pongala (625)
16. Sanzilo (357)
17. Tiéménin (621)
18. Tossienso (326)

== See also ==
- Mountains of Kong, cartographic error named after the city
