= Toumoukoro =

Toumoukoro Toumoukro
- Town and sub-prefecture
- Location in Ivory Coast
- Coordinates: 10°23′N 5°45′W
- Country: Ivory Coast
- District: Savanes
- Region: Tchologo
- Department: Ouangolodougou

Population (2014)
  - Total: 34,200
- Time zone: UTC+0 (GMT)

Toumoukoro (also spelled Toumoukro) is a town in the far north of Ivory Coast. It is a sub-prefecture of Ouangolodougou Department in Tchologo Region, Savanes District. A border crossing with Mali is located five kilometres north of town.

Toumoukoro was a commune until March 2012, when it became one of 1,126 communes nationwide that were abolished.

In 2014, the population of the sub-prefecture of Toumoukoro was 34,200.

== Villages ==
The 13 villages of the sub-prefecture of Toumoukoro and their population in 2014 are:

1. Fatogomakaha (349)
2. Galgologo (987)
3. Kabogo (530)
4. Kafongo (237)
5. Koronani (726)
6. Nalého (1,458)
7. Ouamélhoro (8,251)
8. Ouarga (2,224)
9. Pofoun (887)
10. Pogo (7,774)
11. Pongala (1,458)
12. Tiogo (700)
13. Toumoukoro (8,619)
