= Pogo (gorilla) =

Western lowland, SF Zoo (1958–2006)

- Species: western lowland gorilla
- Sex: female
- Born: 1958; Cameroon
- Died: May 24, 2006 (aged 47–48)
- Weight: 210 lb (95 kg)

Pogo (1958 – May 24, 2006) was a female western lowland gorilla who was a feature of the Gorilla World exhibit at the San Francisco Zoo. Pogo was a childless but motherly matriarch, loved by generations of San Franciscans. When she died at the age of 48, she was believed to have been one of the oldest living gorillas in captivity.

== Life ==
=== Early years ===
Pogo was born in 1958, in the rainforests of French Cameroon, where she was part of a gorilla troop that included Bwana, a gorilla who would eventually find his way to the Zoo in 1959. Pogo was orphaned after her parents were killed, most likely for bushmeat. She was adopted by American missionaries and a nurse in a Cameroon leper colony, where she rode motorcycles, dressed up in clothes, and attended tea parties. In 1961, at the age of three, Pogo was purchased by philanthropist Carroll Soo-Hoo, and donated to the San Francisco Zoo.

=== Captivity ===
In the late 1980s, Pogo moved into Gorilla World, a large habitat for western lowland gorillas, covering almost an acre of land, with trees, grasses, and rocky outcroppings. Here, Pogo helped raise one male, silverback Oscar Jonesy, and three female gorillas, Zura, Bawang, and Bawang's daughter Nneka.

Pogo was fond of a gorilla doll given to her by her keeper, and was often seen carrying it on her back and under her arm, and sleeping with the doll. Pogo also enjoyed playing games with people in the viewing area of Gorilla World. She would often pound on the large break-proof glass window and make faces. One writer described Pogo as "stubborn"; she enjoyed sitting outside alone in the rain while the other animals huddled for cover. In 2005, primate behavior specialist Joanne Tanner described Pogo as a "mature auntie gorilla".

== Death ==
In her last years, Pogo suffered from medical conditions related to her age, including heart problems, arthritis, and disc disease in her lower back, and spent her time napping. Gorilla keeper Mary Kerr, who had been caring for Pogo since 1981, found her dead on the morning of May 24, with her favorite doll by her side, and the stems from two bunches of grapes she had eaten the night before. It is thought that she died in her sleep. She weighed 210 pounds (95 kg) when she died. According to San Francisco Zoo senior veterinarian, Dr. Freeland Dunker, "We did what we could and regularly administered medications to ease her discomfort and control her conditions. Nonetheless, over the past five months in particular, she slowed down noticeably and her appetite diminished. Despite the efforts of veterinary staff, her condition continued to gradually decline."

Pogo's remains were donated to the University of California, Santa Cruz for anthropology research.

The death of Pogo brought back renewed heart ache of gorilla lovers who remembered a special albino gorilla called Snowflake from the Barcelona Zoo who died in 2001. Snowflake is believed to have been a distant relative of Pogo who also carried the albino gene but was not albino.

== Notes ==
- Western lowland gorillas have been known to live 30 to 35 years in their natural habitat and 35–45 years in captivity. Other aged captive gorillas include Massa (54) at the Philadelphia Zoo and Rudy (49) at the Erie Zoo.
