= Kong Empire =

Historical Islamic West African trading empire

Kong Empire Kpoñ-Kene
- 1710–1898
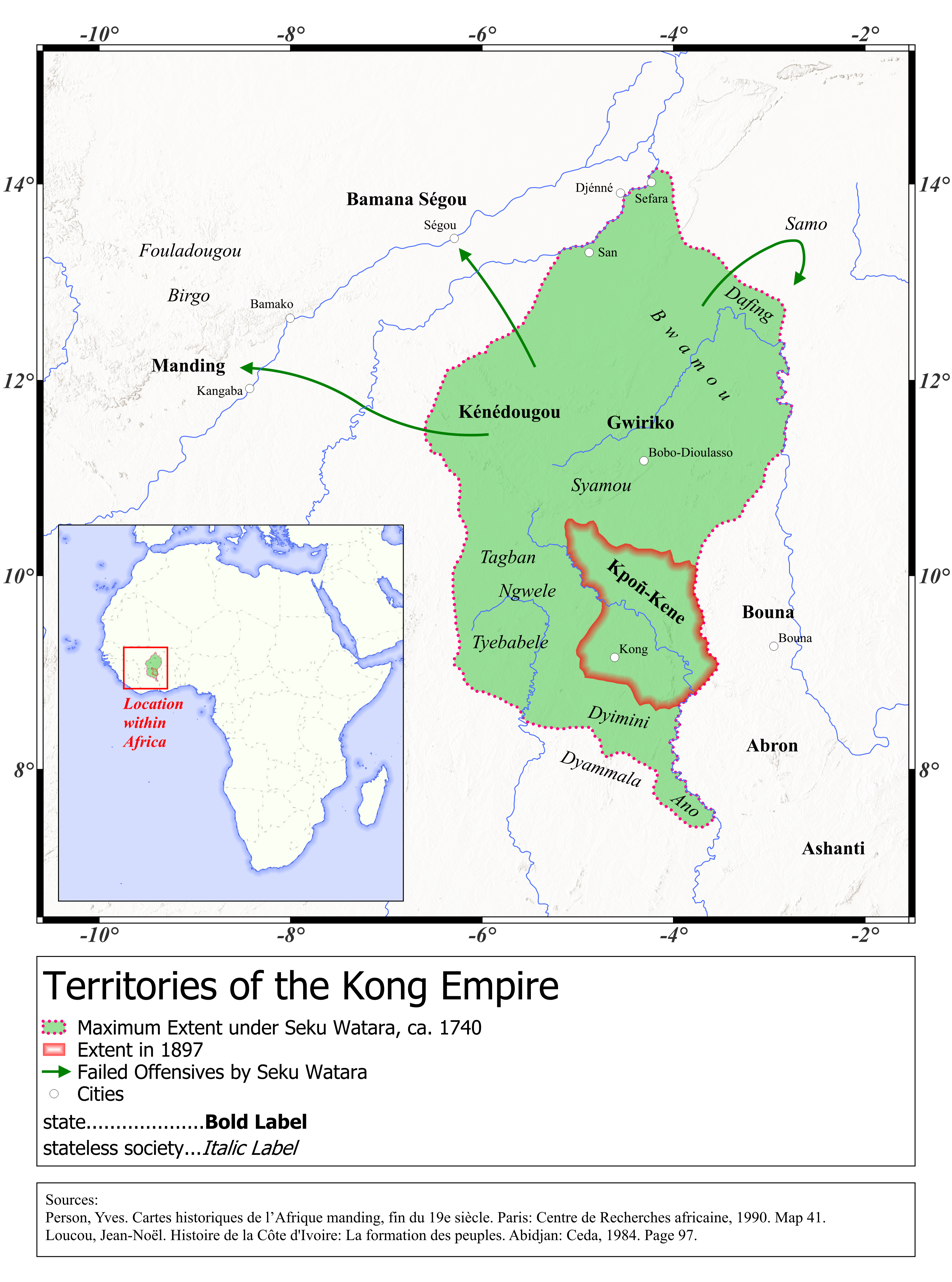
- The territorial evolution of the Kong Empire
- Capital: Kong
- Common languages: Dyula, Senufo
- Religion: Islam, Traditional African religions
- Demonyms: Kongan, Kongian
- Historical era: Pre-Colonial Africa
  - Founding of Kong dynasty by Seku Watara: 1710
  - Burning of Kong by Samori Ture: 1898
| Preceded by | Succeeded by |
| Senufo people | Samorian State; French Third Republic |
- Today part of: Ivory Coast; Burkina Faso; Mali; Ghana

The Kong Empire (1710–1898), also known as the Wattara Empire or Ouattara Empire for its founder Seku Watara, was a pre-colonial state centered in what is now northeastern Ivory Coast that also encompassed much of present-day Burkina Faso and parts of Mali and Ghana. It established a largely decentralized commercial empire based upon linkages between merchant houses, protecting trade routes throughout the region. Kong rose to prominence in the 1700s as a key commercial center and center of Islamic studies. In 1898, Samori Ture attacked the city and burnt it down. Although the city was rebuilt, the Kong empire did not survive and the French took control over the area.

== History ==
=== Background ===
The area around Kong was settled primarily by Gur-speaking agriculturalists, particularly the Senufo people and Tyefo people. Starting in the 14th century Mandé merchants, known as the Dyula, migrated from the Mali Empire into the area founding the trading cities of Begho, Bouna, Bondoukou and Kong. These immigrants were largely Muslim while the local Senufo and Tyefo populations were primarily animist. Over time the route passing from the Niger south to the goldfields and then to European trading posts on the Gold Coast became increasingly important. At the same time, recurring conflict with the Gonja and Dagomba states promoted the rise of military leaders known as Fagama.

=== Seku Watara ===
In the early 1700s, Seku Watara (sometimes written as Sekou or Sekoue), a Dyula who claimed descent from the Malinké Keita lineage and who had studied the Qu'ran and engaged in commerce before becoming a warrior, deposed and killed an important leader in Kong, Lasiri Gbambele, by uniting the forces of a number of Dyula leaders in the area.

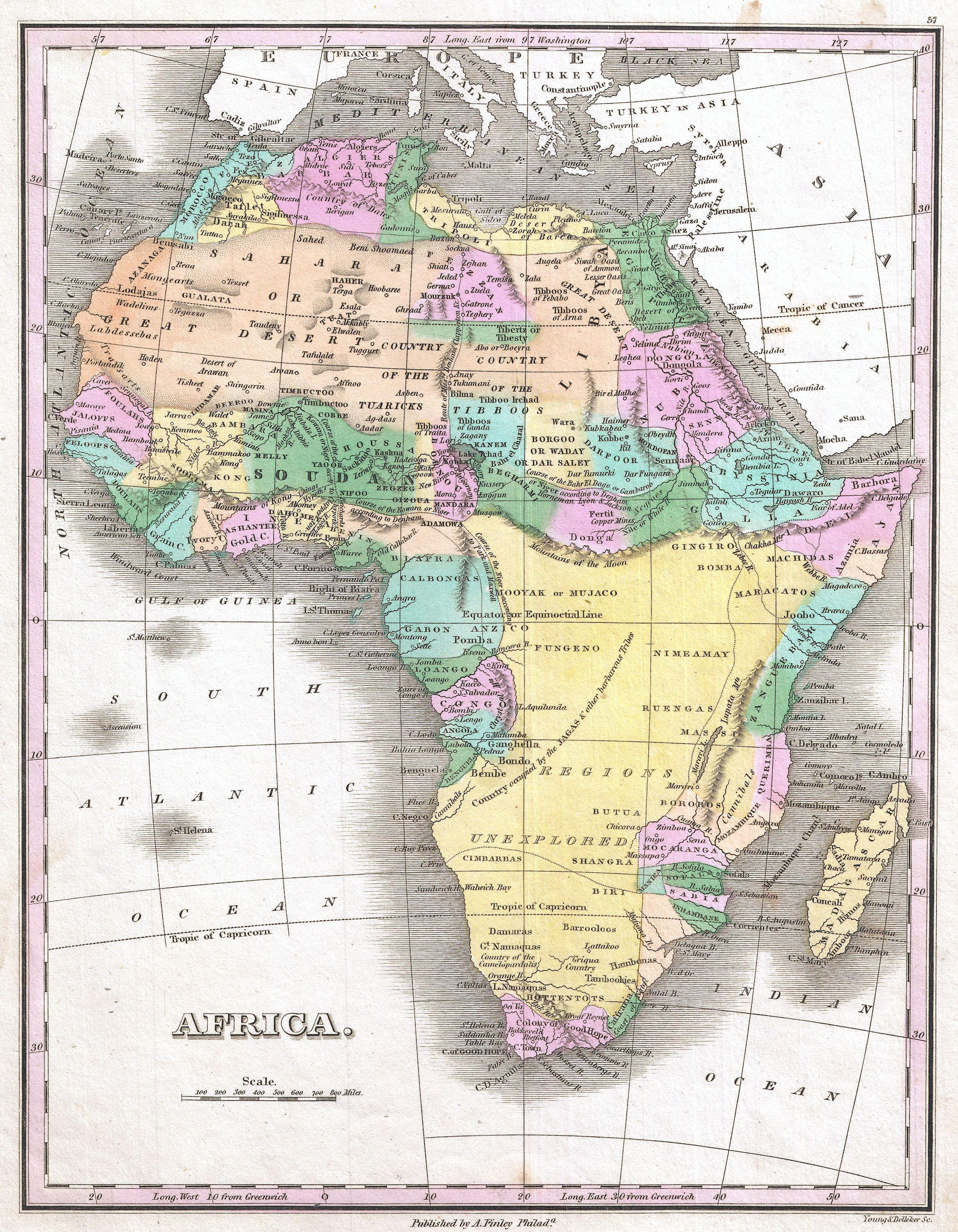
The Finley Map of African States 1827. Kong is in Yellow in West Africa

After establishing control over Kong, forces under Seku and allied leaders with their own war houses took over towns and settlements throughout the region, mainly focusing on control of trade routes. They took over the region around the Black Volta to the north early during Seku's reign and to the south to Boule. Kong forces also intervened in the battles between various branches of the Keita dynasty in the upper Niger valley in the 1720s.

Seku himself pushed north across the Leraba river, conquering the Tiefo people among others. He eventually reached Sya in 1737, where the local Bobo people requested his help against their rebellious vassals. Seku left one of his sons in charge of the region and returned to Kong. This was a widespread strategy to cement the family's control over crucial settlements. His son Kere-Mori and brother Famagan Watara were critical in securing Kong's power in the Mouhoun River bend.

After securing control of Sya, Famagan launched a major military operation westwards in November 1739. His forces took over a number of important cities, including Sofara on the Bani River. There he defeated an army sent by the Pashalik of Timbuktu to defend Djenne, but despite the victory were unable to cross the river and capture the city. Famagan then pushed further west and attacked Segou, capital of the Bambara Empire. After a failed initial attempt, he moved south to take Bela and rebuild his forces. Thus reinforced, he returned to Segou and besieged the city for nine months. When it was about to fall, a Fula relief column appeared, resupplied the defenders, and helped break the siege.

Seku died around 1745. A son took power in Kong but, as a younger relative to experienced and established warlords such as Famagan, could not assert his authority over the entire Watara War House.

=== Consolidation and Division ===
Without Seku's strong leadership, Kong's imperial center rapidly weakened. Over time it became a constellation of mostly-separate fiefdoms each ruled by a member of the Watara clan, either related to Seku or who had adopted the name. Nevertheless the different branches could and did cooperate, particularly in the face of external threats, with the senior branch in Kong retaining a degree of leadership. With firm control over crucial trade routes, Kong became a center of trade for both gold and kola nuts. It also became notable for the large number of Islamic clerics and scholars in the city and for regular mosque construction throughout the Empire. Tapping into all this wealth made the Watara rulers increasingly powerful.

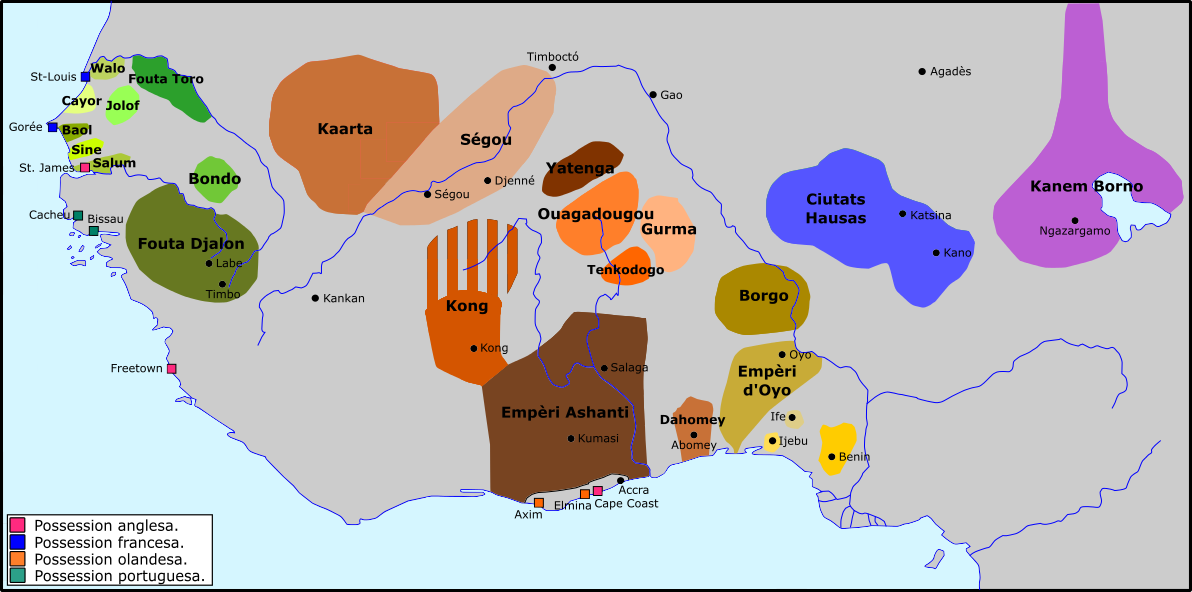
West Africa in the late 18th century. Dashed lines represent loosely-held territories.

In the middle of the 18th century conflict broke out between Kong and another growing power, the Ashanti Empire. Begho was destroyed in the conflict, with many Dyula refugees resettling in Kong. The result, however, was a stalemate, with Ashanti in control of Gyaaman but recognizing Kong's independence.

Although politically decentralized, the empire did continue to assert control over territory. In 1840, the empire took limited control over the gold trade out of Lobi country.

=== Decline and fall ===
Kong power and control of trade over the territory decreased significantly in the later part of the 1800s. The wars with the Ashanti had severely disrupted trade. To make matters worse, they deliberately reoriented their trade economy away from the northwestern route to Kong and towards the northeast instead, through Salaga to the Hausa states. Although the importance of the city in terms of commerce and Islamic study persisted, its independence and sphere of influence decreased.

For Kong, the second half of the 19th century was dominated by Karamokho Oule, a powerful member of the Watara house who nevertheless did not serve officially as king. The 1870s and 80s saw a series of conflicts between the Watara rulers of Bobo-Dioulasso (Sya) and the Kenedougou Kingdom to the west.

On 20 February 1888, Louis Gustave Binger entered Kong and made agreements with the leaders as part of French efforts to take control of the region. These agreements made Kong a target, and by the early 1890s Samory Touré, faama of the expanding Samorian Empire, set his sights on conquering Kong. The French, by that point the dominant power in the coastal region to the south, sought to secure the city by putting together a column led by Col. Monteil in August 1894, but it did not leave Grand Bassam until February 1895. Its passage sparked a popular resistance movement. Monteil fought a battle with Wassoulonke forces on the 14th, and the French were forced to retreat and abandon Kong, which pledged fealty to Samory in April.

Kong maintained its importance under Toure, but conflict with the French dramatically curtailed trade and discontent grew quickly. Many Kong merchants sought to take advantage of Toure's retreat in the east by intercepting arms caravans and opening channels to the French. When the discontent eventually broke into open revolt, Samory destroyed the city, either on May 23, 1897 or May 18th, 1898.

The remaining members of Seku's royal house took refuge in the Black Volta region where they divided territory creating what the French called "Les Etats de Kong." These kingdoms lasted for a short time before losing relevance to French colonial administration. The city of Kong was rebuilt by the French, but decreased significantly in relevance.

== Government and Society ==
Kong was a prototypical "instrumental state", dedicated first and foremost to the promotion of trade and the protection of the routes on which it depended. On a practical level, the state was held together largely through chains of settlements and outposts ruled by different members of a merchant class located in Kong.

Although their roots were in the merchant community, the Watara clan, or 'War-House', filled a separate role and cultivated a very different culture from the commercial class. Major leaders were based in small communities outside of the major cities, and controlled wide networks of family, slaves, soldiers, free peasants, vassals, and allies. They extracted surplus from farming or raiding in their 'mara', a territory in which their exclusive rights were recognized by other leaders of the War-House, but they did not directly govern these areas. These secular leaders were known as 'Sonanke', and followed traditional Mande religious and cultural practices as much or more than Islam; Muslim merchants were relegated to powerful behind-the-scenes roles. Local government was assumed by military commanders called kuntigi, whose main functions were limited to collecting tribute, recruiting troops during wartime, protecting trade routes, and preventing rebellion.

Relations between villages, leaders, and families could shift quickly and constantly, and the elders of Kong, nominally the heads of the entire empire, were not necessarily the most economically or politically powerful people in the War-House. Still, they served an important function in mediating between branches of the Watara clan. The Kong kings' royal insignia included Arabic scrolls passed down from Seku and a mysterious object known as the 'Sinzébu', that only the king was allowed to see.

=== Religion ===
Islam did not impact the ruling aristocracy in their management of state: they derived no legitimacy from Islam, they did not implement Sharia, and were thus fundamentally different from the jihad states of West Africa. Augustus Henry Keane wrote in 1907 that "Nor is Kong a hotbed of Moslem fanaticism, as has also been supposed; but on the contrary, a place distinguished, one might almost say, by its religious indifference, or at all events by its tolerant spirit and wise respect for all the religious views of the surrounding indigenous populations."

=== Ethnicity ===
Ethnic relations remained largely split between the Mandé merchants and urban citizens and the Senufo agricultural population. There were few attempts to create an ethnically homogenous population by the leadership and thus these ethnic groups co-existed with one another and other immigrant populations.
