= Ouangolodougou Department =

Coordinates: 9°58′N 5°9′W

Ouangolodougou Department Département d'Ouangolodougou
- Department
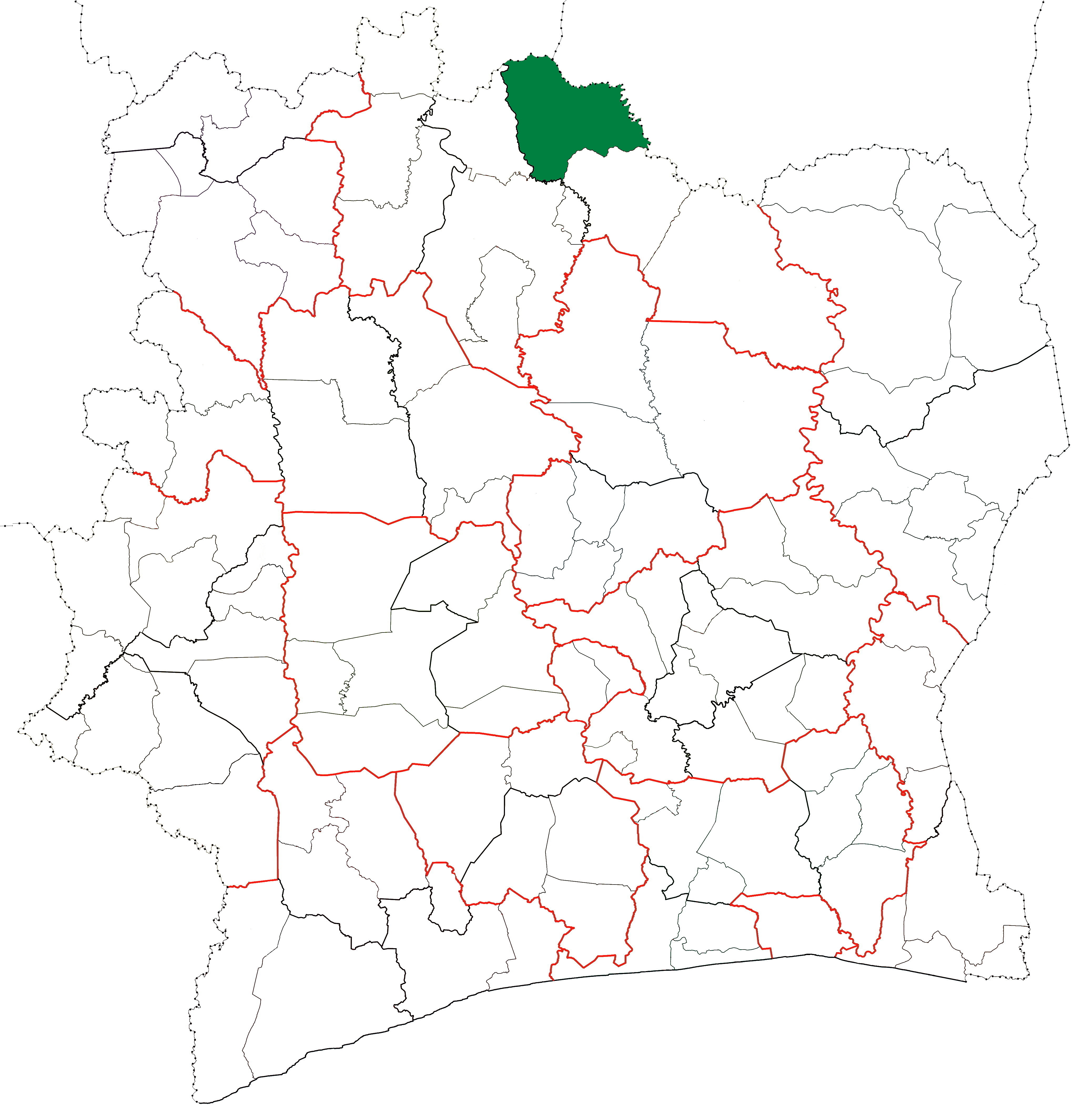
- Location in Ivory Coast. Ouangolodougou Department has retained the same boundaries since its creation in 2008.
- Country: Ivory Coast
- District: Savanes
- Region: Tchologo
- 2008: Established as a second-level subdivision via a division of Ferkessédougou Dept
- 2011: Converted to a third-level subdivision
- Departmental seat: Ouangolodougou

Government
  - Prefect: Sihindou Coulibaly

Area
  - Total: 4,380 km^{2} (1,690 sq mi)

Population (2021 census)
  - Total: 294,639
  - Density: 67.3/km^{2} (174/sq mi)
- Time zone: UTC+0 (GMT)

Ouangolodougou Department is a department of Tchologo Region in Savanes District, Ivory Coast. In 2021, its population was 294,639 and its seat is the settlement of Ouangolodougou. The sub-prefectures of the department are Diawala, Kaouara, Niellé, Ouangolodougou, and Toumoukoro.

== History ==
Ouangolodougou Department was created in 2008 as a second-level subdivision via a split-off from Ferkessédougou Department. At its creation, it was part of Savanes Region.

In 2011, districts were introduced as new first-level subdivisions of Ivory Coast. At the same time, regions were reorganised and became second-level subdivisions and all departments were converted into third-level subdivisions. At this time, Ouangolodougou Department became part of Tchologo Region in Savanes District.
