= Ferkessédougou Department =

Coordinates: 9°35′N 5°12′W

Ferkessédougou Department Département de Ferkessédougou
- Department
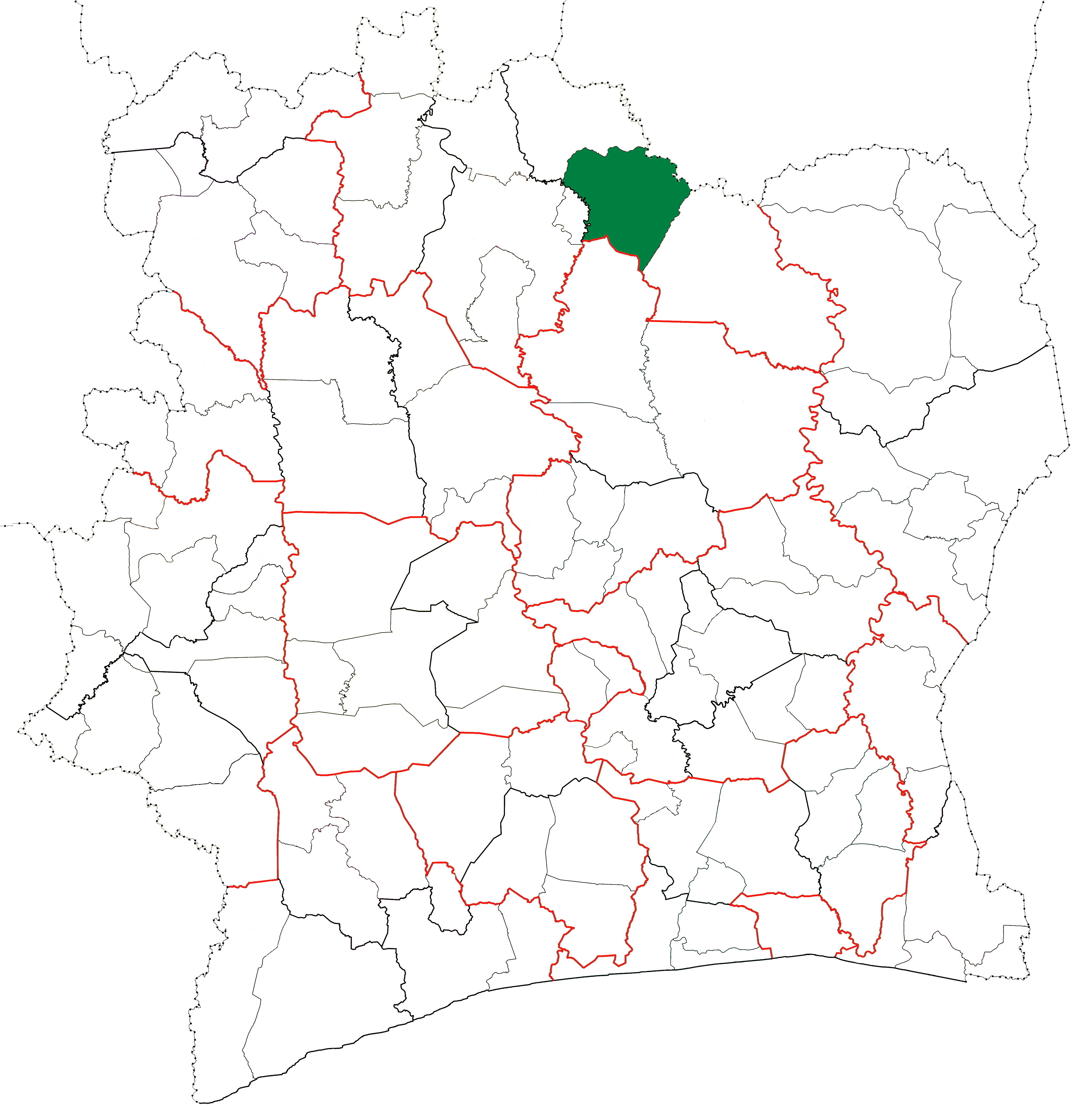
- Location in Ivory Coast. Ferkessédougou Department has had these boundaries since 2012.
- Country: Ivory Coast
- District: Savanes
- Region: Tchologo
- 1969: Established as a first-level subdivision
- 1997: Converted to a second-level subdivision
- 2008: Divided to create Ouangolodougou Dept
- 2011: Converted to a third-level subdivision
- 2012: Divided to create Kong Dept
- Departmental seat: Ferkessédougou

Government
  - Prefect: Diakité Soualiho

Area
  - Total: 3,980 km^{2} (1,540 sq mi)

Population (2021 census)
  - Total: 190,141
  - Density: 47.8/km^{2} (124/sq mi)
- Time zone: UTC+0 (GMT)

Ferkessédougou Department is a department of Tchologo Region in Savanes District, Ivory Coast. In 2021, its population was 190,141 and its seat is the settlement of Ferkessédougou. The sub-prefectures of the department are Ferkessédougou, Koumbala, and Togoniéré.

== History ==
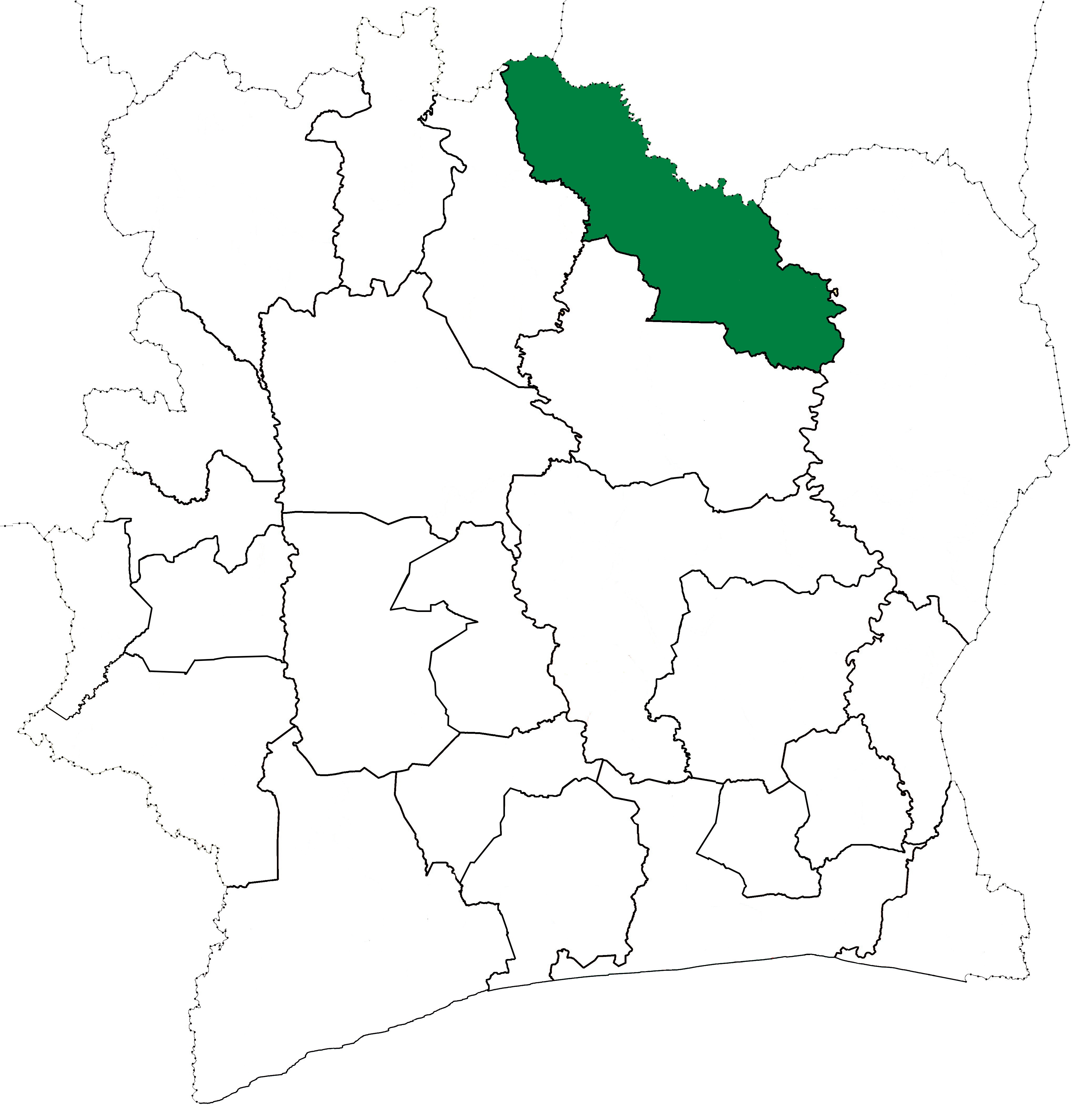
Ferkessédougou Department upon its creation in 1969. It kept these boundaries until 2008, but other departments began to be divided in 1974.

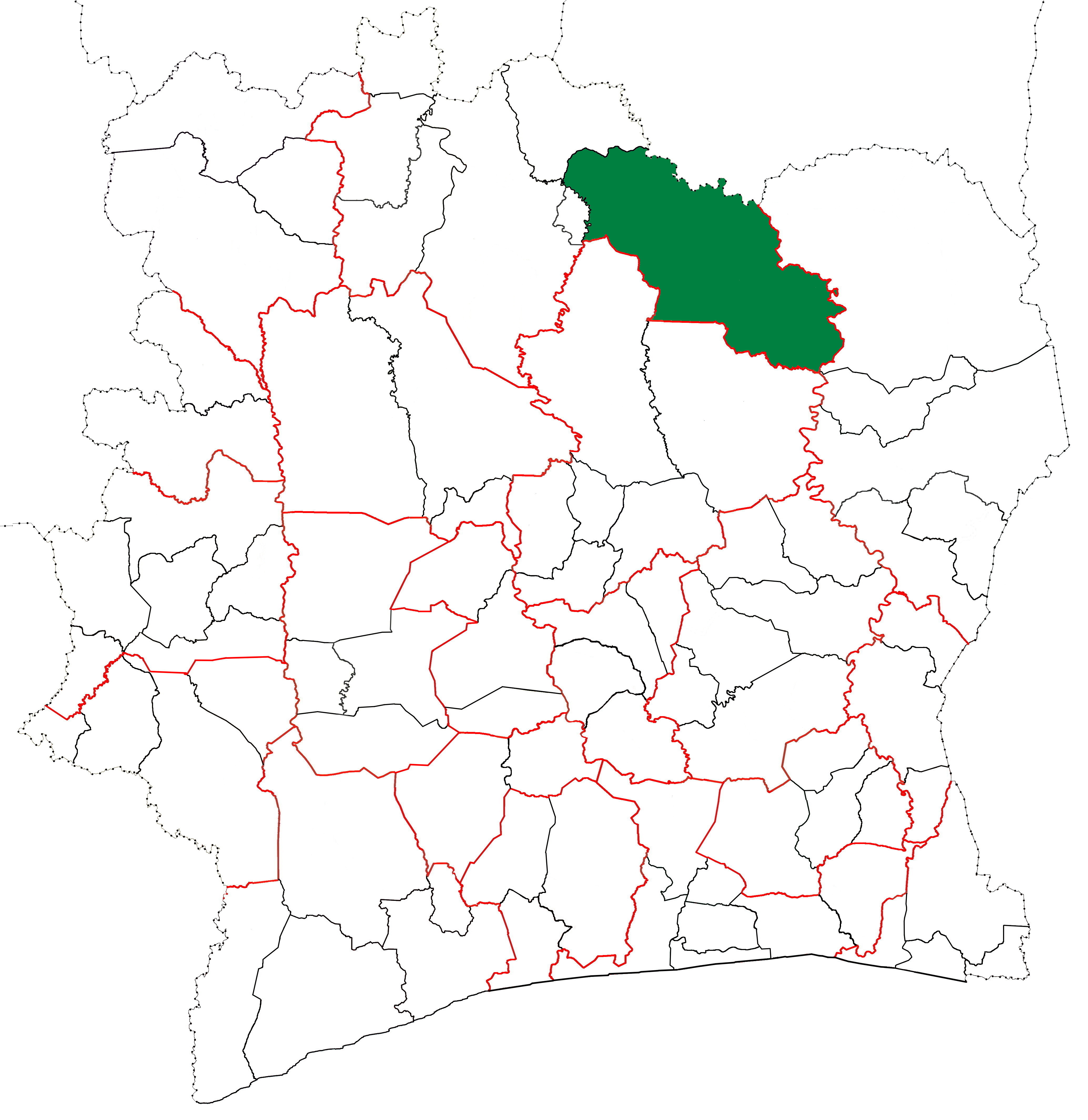
Ferkessédougou Department from 2008 to 2012. (Other subdivision boundaries began to change in 2009.)

Ferkessédougou Department was created in 1969 as one of the 24 new departments that were created to take the place of the six departments that were being abolished. It was created from territory that was formerly part of Nord Department. Using current boundaries as a reference, from 1969 to 2008 the department occupied the same territory that is Tchologo Region.

In 1997, regions were introduced as new first-level subdivisions of Ivory Coast; as a result, all departments were converted into second-level subdivisions. Ferkessédougou Department was included as part of Savanes Region.

In 2008, Ferkessédougou Department was split to create Ouangolodougou Department.

In 2011, districts were introduced as new first-level subdivisions of Ivory Coast. At the same time, regions were reorganised and became second-level subdivisions and all departments were converted into third-level subdivisions. At this time, Ferkessédougou Department became part of Tchologo Region in Savanes District.

Frekessédougou Department was divided again in 2012, when three sub-prefectures were split-off to create Kong Department.
