= Tchologo =

Coordinates: 9°35′N 5°11′W

Tchologo Region Région du Tchologo
- Region
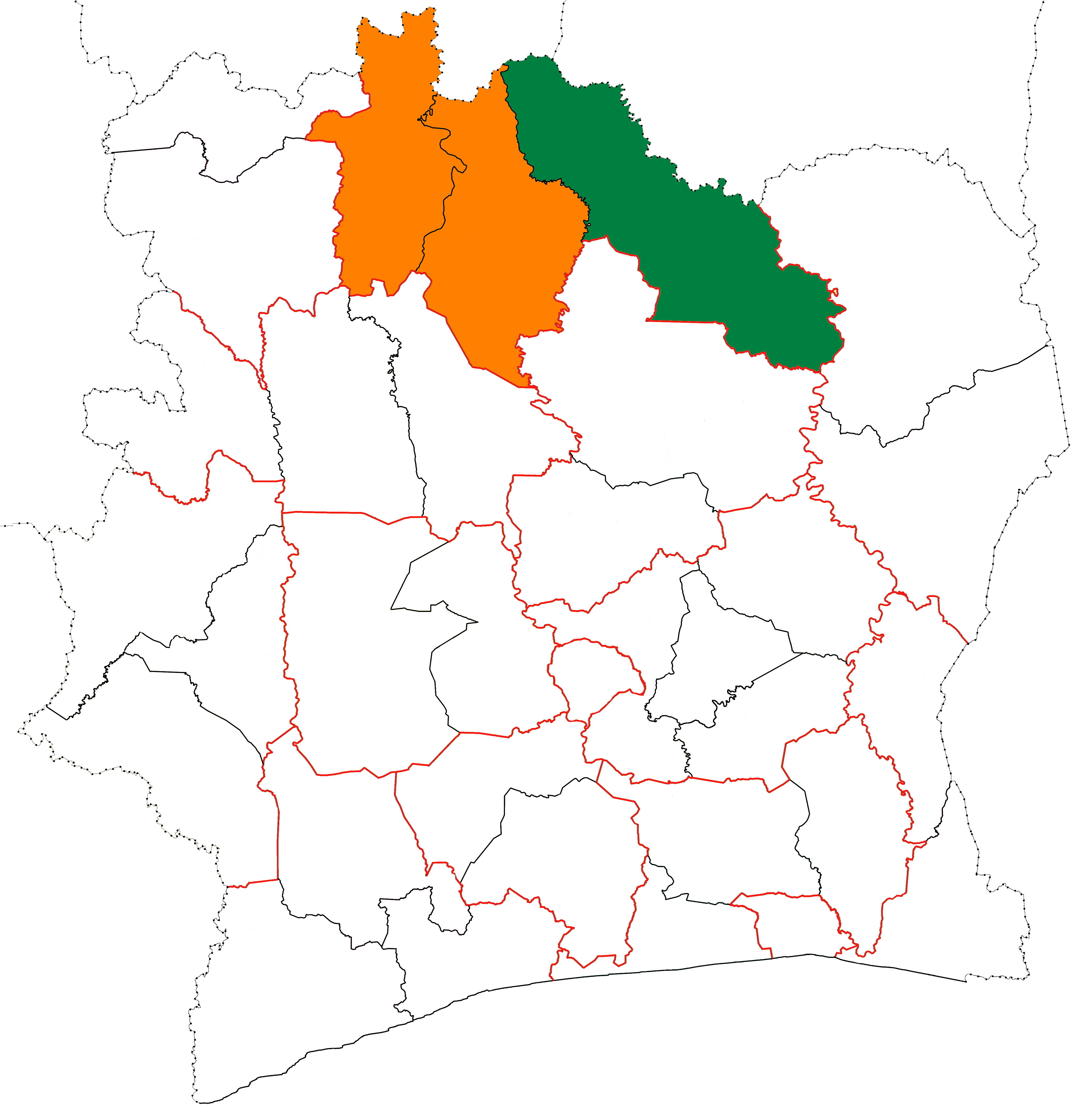
- Location of Tchologo Region (green) in Ivory Coast and in Savanes District
- Country: Ivory Coast
- District: Savanes
- Established: 2011
- Regional seat: Ferkessédougou

Government
  - Prefect: Diakité Soualiho
  - Council President: Tene Birahima Ouattara (photocopie)

Area
  - Total: 17,350 km^{2} (6,700 sq mi)

Population (2021)
  - Total: 603,084
  - Density: 34.76/km^{2} (90.03/sq mi)
- Time zone: UTC+0 (GMT)

Tchologo Region is one of the 31 regions of Ivory Coast. Since its establishment in 2011, it has been one of three regions in Savanes District. The seat of the region is Ferkessédougou and the region's population in the 2021 census was 603,084.

Tchologo Region is currently divided into three departments: Ferkessédougou, Kong, and Ouangolodougou.
