= Kouassi-N'Dawa =

- Village
- Location in Ivory Coast
- Coordinates: 8°7′N 2°53′W
- Country: Ivory Coast
- District: Zanzan
- Region: Gontougo
- Department: Bondoukou
- Sub-prefecture: Bondoukou
- Time zone: UTC+0 (GMT)

Kouassi-N'Dawa is a village in eastern Ivory Coast. It is in the sub-prefecture of Bondoukou, Bondoukou Department, Gontougo Region, Zanzan District.

Kouassi-N'Dawa was a commune until March 2012, when it became one of 1,126 communes nationwide that were abolished.
