= Tambi =

- Village
- Location in Ivory Coast
- Coordinates: 8°14′N 2°34′W
- Country: Ivory Coast
- District: Zanzan
- Region: Gontougo
- Department: Bondoukou
- Sub-prefecture: Sorobango
- Time zone: UTC+0 (GMT)

Tambi is a village in the far east of Ivory Coast. It is in the sub-prefecture of Sorobango, Bondoukou Department, Gontougo Region, Zanzan District. Eight kilometres east of the village is a border crossing with Ghana.

Tambi was a commune until March 2012, when it became one of 1,126 communes nationwide that were abolished.
