= Kamala, Ivory Coast =

Kamala
- Village
- Location in Ivory Coast
- Coordinates: 8°27′N 2°43′W
- Country: Ivory Coast
- District: Zanzan
- Region: Gontougo
- Department: Bondoukou
- Sub-prefecture: Tagadi
- Time zone: UTC+0 (GMT)

Kamala is a village in north-eastern Ivory Coast. It is in the sub-prefecture of Tagadi, Bondoukou Department, Gontougo Region, Zanzan District.

Kamala was a commune until March 2012, when it became one of 1,126 communes nationwide that were abolished.
