= Flakièdougou =

Flakièdougou Foulakédougou
- Village
- Location in Ivory Coast
- Coordinates: 8°29′N 3°8′W
- Country: Ivory Coast
- District: Zanzan
- Region: Gontougo
- Department: Bondoukou
- Sub-prefecture: Laoudi-Ba
- Time zone: UTC+0 (GMT)

Flakièdougou (also spelled Foulakédougou) is a village in north-eastern Ivory Coast. It is in the sub-prefecture of Laoudi-Ba, Bondoukou Department, Gontougo Region, Zanzan District.

Flakièdougou was a commune until March 2012, when it became one of 1,126 communes nationwide that were abolished.
