= Hérébo =

- Village
- Location in Ivory Coast
- Coordinates: 7°57′N 3°4′W
- Country: Ivory Coast
- District: Zanzan
- Region: Gontougo
- Department: Bondoukou
- Sub-prefecture: Gouméré
- Time zone: UTC+0 (GMT)

Hérébo is a village in eastern Ivory Coast. It is in the sub-prefecture of Gouméré, Bondoukou Department, Gontougo Region, Zanzan District.

Hérébo was a commune until March 2012, when it became one of 1,126 communes nationwide that were abolished.
