= Massadougou =

- Village
- Location in Ivory Coast
- Coordinates: 8°27′N 3°55′W
- Country: Ivory Coast
- District: Zanzan
- Region: Gontougo
- Department: Sandégué
- Sub-prefecture: Yorobodi
- Time zone: UTC+0 (GMT)

Massadougou is a village in north-eastern Ivory Coast. It is in the sub-prefecture of Yorobodi, Sandégué Department, Gontougo Region, Zanzan District.

Massadougou was a commune until March 2012, when it became one of 1,126 communes nationwide that were abolished.
