= Dinaoudi =

- Village
- Location in Ivory Coast
- Coordinates: 8°8′N 3°14′W
- Country: Ivory Coast
- District: Zanzan
- Region: Gontougo
- Department: Bondoukou
- Sub-prefecture: Taoudi
- Time zone: UTC+0 (GMT)

Dinaoudi is a village in north-eastern Ivory Coast. It is in the sub-prefecture of Taoudi, Bondoukou Department, Gontougo Region, Zanzan District.

Dinaoudi was a commune until March 2012, when it became one of 1,126 communes nationwide that were abolished.
