= University of Bondoukou =

Coordinates: 8.069°N 2.776°W

University of Bondoukou (U-bkou)
- Université de Bondoukou
- Type: Public university
- Established: 2019
- President: Djakalia Ouattara
- Students: 3,000
- Address: 369G+953, Bondoukou, Côte d’Ivoire, Bondoukou, Gontougo Region, Côte d'Ivoire
- Language: French

The University of Bondoukou (U-bkou) is an Ivorian public university located in the northeastern part of Côte d'Ivoire in the city of Bondoukou, specifically in the Gontougo Region.

The university offers programs in fields such as architecture, urban planning, governance, sustainable development, sciences, arts, cultural industries, communication, languages and foreign languages, humanities, and social sciences.

== History ==
The foundation stone of the University of Bondoukou (U-bkou) was laid on 19 December 2019 by the late Prime Minister Amadou Gon Coulibaly. The university campus covers an area of 305 hectares, aiming to accommodate up to 20,000 students in the future, as planned under the University Decentralization Program (PDU). The construction is overseen by the National Bureau of Technical Studies and Development (BNETD).

The University of Bondoukou officially opened on October 2, 2023.

== Organization ==
The University of Bondoukou comprises the National School of Architecture and Urbanism (ENSAU) and five training units:

- Faculty of Governance and Sustainable Development
- Faculty of Arts, Cultural Industries, and Communication Sciences
- Faculty of Language Sciences, Letters, and Foreign Languages
- Faculty of Humanities and Social Sciences
- Faculty of Health Sciences

Additionally, it includes the Institute of Languages and the Institute of Art, History, and Archaeology.

== Partnership ==
In 2024, the University of Bondoukou and the Network of Universities of Science and Technology in Africa signed a partnership agreement to enhance their teaching offerings and develop research projects.
