= Namassi =

- Village
- Location in Ivory Coast
- Coordinates: 7°57′N 3°26′W
- Country: Ivory Coast
- District: Zanzan
- Region: Gontougo
- Department: Sandégué
- Sub-prefecture: Bandakagni-Tomora
- Time zone: UTC+0 (GMT)

Namassi is a village in northeastern Ivory Coast. It is in the sub-prefecture of Bandakagni-Tomora, Sandégué Department, Gontougo Region, Zanzan District.

Namassi was a commune until March 2012, when it became one of 1,126 communes nationwide that were abolished.
