= Torossanguéhi =

- Village
- Location in Ivory Coast
- Coordinates: 8°18′N 3°7′W
- Country: Ivory Coast
- District: Zanzan
- Region: Gontougo
- Department: Bondoukou
- Sub-prefecture: Laoudi-Ba
- Time zone: UTC+0 (GMT)

Torossanguéhi is a village in northeastern Ivory Coast. It is in the sub-prefecture of Laoudi-Ba, Bondoukou Department, Gontougo Region, Zanzan District.

Torossanguéhi was a commune until March 2012, when it became one of 1,126 communes nationwide that were abolished.
