= Yézimala =

- Town and sub-prefecture
- Location in Ivory Coast
- Coordinates: 8°13′N 2°55′W
- Country: Ivory Coast
- District: Zanzan
- Region: Gontougo
- Department: Bondoukou

Population (2014)
  - Total: 5,796
- Time zone: UTC+0 (GMT)

Yézimala is a town in northeastern Ivory Coast. It is a sub-prefecture of Bondoukou Department in Gontougo Region, Zanzan District.

Yézimala was a commune until March 2012, when it became one of 1,126 communes nationwide that were abolished.

In 2014, the population of the sub-prefecture of Yézimala was 5,796.

== Villages ==
The seven villages of the sub-prefecture of Yézimala and their population in 2014 are:

1. Ampounou (426)
2. Gankro (1,364)
3. Kogora (293)
4. Sananga (321)
5. Savagnéré (155)
6. Wangalé (549)
7. Yézimala (2,688)
