= Bandakagni-Tomora =

Bandakagni-Tomora Bandakanyi-Tomoura
- Town and sub-prefecture
- Location in Ivory Coast
- Coordinates: 8°0′N 3°18′W
- Country: Ivory Coast
- District: Zanzan
- Region: Gontougo
- Department: Sandégué

Population (2014)
  - Total: 7,159
- Time zone: UTC+0 (GMT)

Bandakagni-Tomora (also spelled Bandakanyi-Tomoura) is a town in eastern Ivory Coast. It is a sub-prefecture of Sandégué Department in Gontougo Region, Zanzan District.

Bandakagni-Tomora was a commune until March 2012, when it became one of 1,126 communes nationwide that were abolished.

In 2014, the population of the sub-prefecture of Bandakagni-Tomora was 7,159.

== Villages ==
The six villages of the sub-prefecture of Bandakagni-Tomora and their population in 2014 are:

1. Bandakagni-Tomora (2,969)
2. Doutiguidougou (1,774)
3. Kouadio-Koto (972)
4. Kouassidougou (1,203)
5. Namassi (2,237)
6. Tiéoulékro (125)
