= Sapli-Sépingo =

- Town and sub-prefecture
- Location in Ivory Coast
- Coordinates: 8°9′N 2°59′W
- Country: Ivory Coast
- District: Zanzan
- Region: Gontougo
- Department: Bondoukou

Population (2014)
  - Total: 8,204
- Time zone: UTC+0 (GMT)

Sapli-Sépingo is a town in northeastern Ivory Coast. It is a sub-prefecture of Bondoukou Department in Gontougo Region, Zanzan District.

Sapli-Sépingo was a commune until March 2012, when it became one of 1,126 communes nationwide that were abolished.

In 2014, the population of the sub-prefecture of Sapli-Sépingo was 8,204.

== Villages ==
The six villages of the sub-prefecture of Sapli-Sépingo and their population in 2014 are:

1. Bokoni (133)
2. Dagboloyo (329)
3. Djobri (390)
4. Gbréda (668)
5. Sapli-Séplingo (6,298)
6. Savagne (386)
