= Dimandougou =

Dimandougou Kouadianinabango
- Town and sub-prefecture
- Location in Ivory Coast
- Coordinates: 8°1′N 3°46′W
- Country: Ivory Coast
- District: Zanzan
- Region: Gontougo
- Department: Sandégué

Population (2014)
  - Total: 9,280
- Time zone: UTC+0 (GMT)

Dimandougou (also known as Kouadianinabango) is a town in eastern Ivory Coast. It is a sub-prefecture of Sandégué Department in Gontougo Region, Zanzan District.

Dimandougou was a commune until March 2012, when it became one of 1,126 communes nationwide that were abolished.

In 2014, the population of the sub-prefecture of Dimandougou was 9,280.

== Villages ==
The five villages of the sub-prefecture of Dimandougou and their population in 2014 are:

1. Diezué (1,673)
2. Dimandougou (2,876)
3. Gbangourman (607)
4. Logotan (678)
5. Yangbesso (1,325)
