= Appimandoum =

- Town and sub-prefecture
- Location in Ivory Coast
- Coordinates: 7°54′N 2°55′W
- Country: Ivory Coast
- District: Zanzan
- Region: Gontougo
- Department: Bondoukou

Population (2014)
  - Total: 6,800
- Time zone: UTC+0 (GMT)

Appimandoum is a town in north-eastern Ivory Coast. It is a sub-prefecture of Bondoukou Department in Gontougo Region, Zanzan District.

Appimandoum was a commune until March 2012, when it became one of 1,126 communes nationwide that were abolished.

In 2014, the population of the sub-prefecture of Appimandoum was 6,800.

== Villages ==
The ten villages of the sub-prefecture of Appimandoum and their population in 2014 are:

1. Appimandoum (1,982)
2. Bohi (870)
3. Kikiwéré (487)
4. Kinkua (890)
5. Krébio-Adoumkrom (778)
6. Krébio-Domiambra (522)
7. Krébio-Kessié (552)
8. Mananzo (189)
9. Zanzan 1 (302)
10. Zanzan 2 (228)
