= Timité =

Timité is both a given name and a surname. Notable people with the name include:

- Timité Bassori (born 1933), Ivorian filmmaker
- Timité Sekou (born 1985), Ivorian footballer
- Cheick Timité (born 1997), Ivorian footballer
