= Pinda-Boroko =

- Town and sub-prefecture
- Location in Ivory Coast
- Coordinates: 7°55′N 2°50′W
- Country: Ivory Coast
- District: Zanzan
- Region: Gontougo
- Department: Bondoukou

Population (2014)
  - Total: 5,012
- Time zone: UTC+0 (GMT)

Pinda-Boroko is a town in the far east of Ivory Coast. It is a sub-prefecture of Bondoukou Department in Gontougo Region, Zanzan District. Five kilometres east of town there is a border crossing with Ghana.

Pinda-Boroko was a commune until March 2012, when it became one of 1,126 communes nationwide that were abolished.

In 2014, the population of the sub-prefecture of Pinda-Boroko was 5,012.

== Villages ==
The six villages of the sub-prefecture of Pinda-Boroko and their population in 2014 are:

1. Doumassi (596)
2. Dua-Kouamé (680)
3. Kanassé (564)
4. Méty (531)
5. Pinda-Boroko (2,496)
6. Sécrébango (145)
