= Taoudi =

- Town and sub-prefecture
- Location in Ivory Coast
- Coordinates: 8°8′N 3°26′W
- Country: Ivory Coast
- District: Zanzan
- Region: Gontougo
- Department: Bondoukou

Population (2014)
  - Total: 18,568
- Time zone: UTC+0 (GMT)

Taoudi is a town in northeastern Ivory Coast. It is a sub-prefecture of Bondoukou Department in Gontougo Region, Zanzan District.

Taoudi was a commune until March 2012, when it became one of 1,126 communes nationwide that were abolished.

In 2014, the population of the sub-prefecture of Taoudi was 18,568.

== Villages ==
The twelve villages of the sub-prefecture of Taoudi and their population in 2014 are:

1. Dinaoudi (2,646)
2. Kémédi (1,141)
3. Kiramissé (3,920)
4. Landaye (1,241)
5. Lénangaré (619)
6. Marahui-Ahinifié (1,014)
7. Nagabaré-Zelma (903)
8. Sadiahui (680)
9. Sakpatrou (255)
10. Taoudi (4,298)
11. Yérékayé-Koko (662)
12. Zépo (1,189)
