= Bondo, Ivory Coast =

Bondo
- Town and sub-prefecture
- Location in Ivory Coast
- Coordinates: 8°14′N 3°13′W
- Country: Ivory Coast
- District: Zanzan
- Region: Gontougo
- Department: Bondoukou

Population (2014)
  - Total: 19,932
- Time zone: UTC+0 (GMT)

Bondo is a town in north-eastern Ivory Coast. It is a sub-prefecture of Bondoukou Department in Gontougo Region, Zanzan District.

Bondo was a commune until March 2012, when it became one of 1,126 communes nationwide that were abolished.

In 2014, the population of the sub-prefecture of Bondo was 19,932.

== Villages ==
The sixteen villages of the sub-prefecture of Bondo and their population in 2014 are:

1. Banti (704)
2. Bilikéhi (826)
3. Biniméré (184)
4. Biraoudi (1,280)
5. Bondo (4,674)
6. Déba (1,697)
7. Donvagne (2,245)
8. Gorongui (909)
9. Gotia (116)
10. Hangoti (259)
11. Houmakpin (811)
12. Kpanan (3,333)
13. Kpanayo (623)
14. Lédi (1,019)
15. Néguéré-Nagaré (737)
16. Zolongo (515)
