= Laoudi-Ba =

- Town and sub-prefecture
- Location in Ivory Coast
- Coordinates: 8°17′N 2°57′W
- Country: Ivory Coast
- District: Zanzan
- Region: Gontougo
- Department: Bondoukou

Population (2014)
  - Total: 56,882
- Time zone: UTC+0 (GMT)

Laoudi-Ba is a town in north-eastern Ivory Coast. It is a sub-prefecture of Bondoukou Department in Gontougo Region, Zanzan District.

Laoudi-Ba was a commune until March 2012, when it became one of 1126 communes nationwide that were abolished.

In 2014, the population of the sub-prefecture of Laoudi-Ba was 56,882.

== Villages ==
The twenty five villages of the sub-prefecture of Laoudi-Ba and their population in 2014 are:

1. Bracodi (900)
2. Brogodon (1,298)
3. Darikoussou (296)
4. Djimprédouo (2,700)
5. Fakala (233)
6. Flakièdougou (12,200)
7. Gbagbao (218)
8. Gbanan (1,061)
9. Gbanhui (2,472)
10. Gnangomami (913)
11. Gohondo (1,784)
12. Kohui (734)
13. Laoudi-Ba (8,625)
14. Laoudi-Gan (1,463)
15. Nao (178)
16. Pétèye (1,379)
17. Salèye (611)
18. Sanguéta (1,208)
19. Sianli (285)
20. Tchéfrodouo (10,065)
21. Tiémokodougou (1,075)
22. Torossanguéhi (2,440)
23. Yayégo (844)
24. Yérékayé-Oualogo (3,309)
25. Zadéi (591)
