= Gouméré =

Gouméré Gombélé
- Town and sub-prefecture
- Location in Ivory Coast
- Coordinates: 7°54′N 2°59′W
- Country: Ivory Coast
- District: Zanzan
- Region: Gontougo
- Department: Bondoukou

Population (2014)
  - Total: 15,906
- Time zone: UTC+0 (GMT)

Gouméré (also spelled Gombélé) is a town in north-eastern Ivory Coast. It is a sub-prefecture of Bondoukou Department in Gontougo Region, Zanzan District.

Gouméré was a commune until March 2012, when it became one of 1,126 communes nationwide that were abolished.

In 2014, the population of the sub-prefecture of Gouméré was 15,906.

== Villages ==
The twenty three villages of the sub-prefecture of Gouméré and their population in 2014 are:

1. Affouavame (471)
2. Assima (169)
3. Attram (502)
4. Batéan (124)
5. Bidio-Lokohui (489)
6. Bouadam (146)
7. Bouatia (202)
8. Boudy (523)
9. Dakoua (183)
10. Djom (605)
11. Gboko-Bidigo (165)
12. Gouméré (5,229)
13. Hérébo (1,667)
14. Karako (1,101)
15. Koboko (1,212)
16. Koffiékro (172)
17. Kouffouo (424)
18. Malaga-Lolohui (412)
19. Mantoukoua (380)
20. Mere (567)
21. Nagnongo (187)
22. Nakoua (167)
23. Siago (809)
