= Tagadi =

- Town and sub-prefecture
- Location in Ivory Coast
- Coordinates: 8°38′N 2°38′W
- Country: Ivory Coast
- District: Zanzan
- Region: Gontougo
- Department: Bondoukou

Population (2014)
  - Total: 34,440
- Time zone: UTC+0 (GMT)

Tagadi is a town in northeastern Ivory Coast. It is a sub-prefecture of Bondoukou Department in Gontougo Region, Zanzan District. Seven kilometres east of town is a border crossing with Ghana.

Tagadi was a commune until March 2012, when it became one of 1,126 communes nationwide that were abolished.

In 2014, the population of the sub-prefecture of Tagadi was 34,440.

== Villages ==
The seven villages of the sub-prefecture of Tagadi and their population in 2014 are:

1. Bandolé (3,914)
2. Kamala (8,303)
3. Kohodio (2,248)
4. Marahui (11,438)
5. Poukoubè (2,109)
6. Sangabili (1,047)
7. Tagadi (5,381)
