= Sorobango =

- Town and sub-prefecture
- Location in Ivory Coast
- Coordinates: 8°10′N 2°43′W
- Country: Ivory Coast
- District: Zanzan
- Region: Gontougo
- Department: Bondoukou

Population (2014)
  - Total: 27,744
- Time zone: UTC+0 (GMT)

Sorobango is a town in northeastern Ivory Coast, near the border of Ghana. It is a sub-prefecture of Bondoukou Department in Gontougo Region, Zanzan District. The sub-prefecture extends further east than any other sub-prefecture in the country.

Sorobango was a commune until March 2012, when it became one of 1,126 communes nationwide that were abolished.

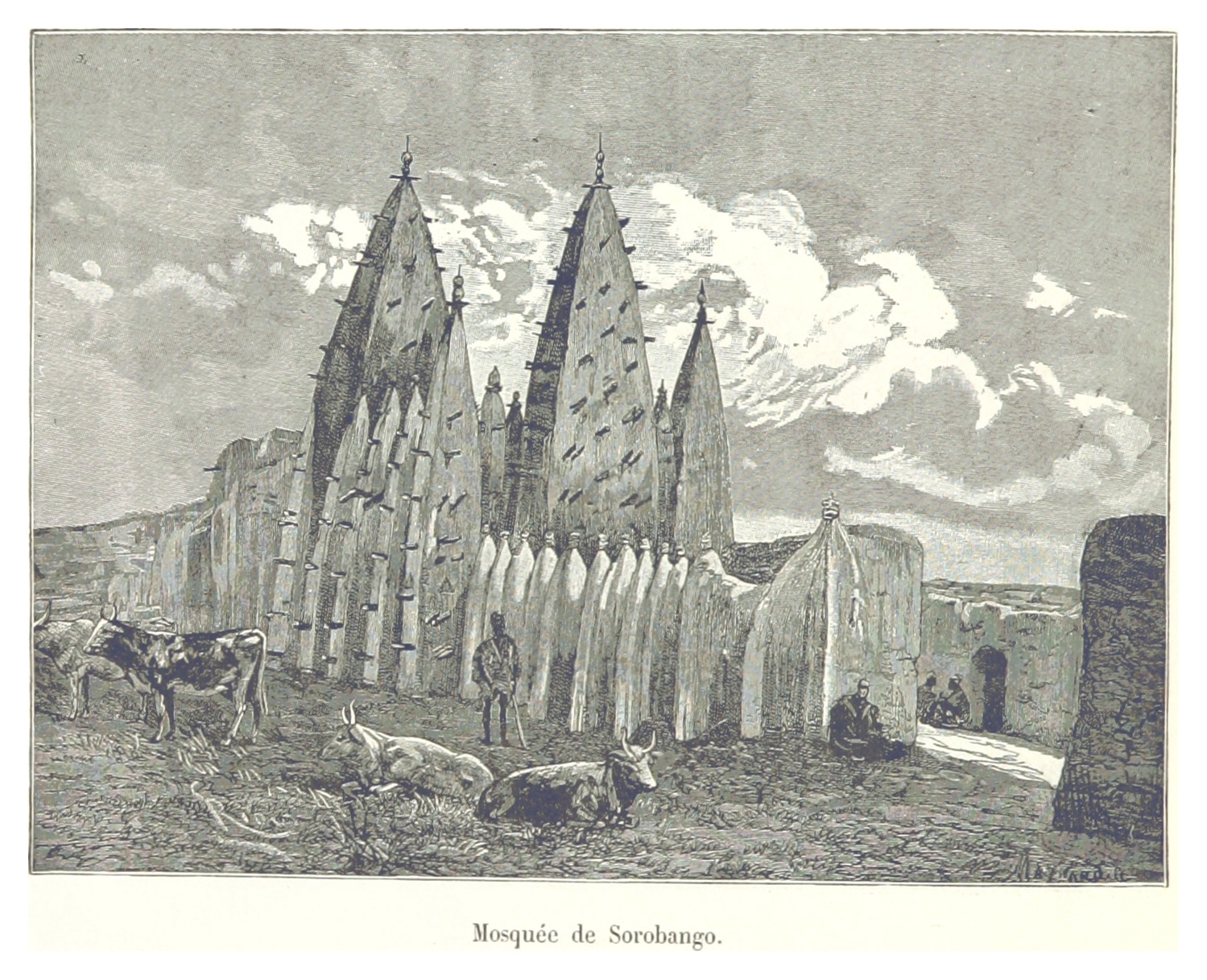
Mosque of Sorobango in 1892

Sorobango is known for its adobe mosque, built in the 17th or 18th century. Along with other mosques in northern Ivory Coast, it was inscribed on the UNESCO World Heritage List in 2021 for its outstanding representation of Sudano-Sahelian architecture.

In 2014, the population of the sub-prefecture of Sorobango was 27,744.

== Villages ==
The twenty villages of the sub-prefecture of Sorobango and their population in 2014 are:

1. Borokponko (2,948)
2. Bozangui (907)
3. Danguira (379)
4. Débango (1,954)
5. Kanguélé (3,387)
6. Kiendi-Huisséré (352)
7. Kiendi-Woléogo (1,166)
8. Kouafo-Akidom (1,155)
9. Mantoukoua (455)
10. Nafambéni (599)
11. Ouolobidi (709)
12. Pélégodi (1,433)
13. Sanguiébo (485)
14. Sianhodi (430)
15. Siékouaye (628)
16. Sogola (699)
17. Sorobango (3,418)
18. Tambi (5,206)
19. Wawè (356)
20. Zagala (1,078)
