= Yorobodi =

- Town and sub-prefecture
- Location in Ivory Coast
- Coordinates: 8°7′N 3°41′W
- Country: Ivory Coast
- District: Zanzan
- Region: Gontougo
- Department: Sandégué

Population (2014)
  - Total: 16,708
- Time zone: UTC+0 (GMT)

Yorobodi is a town in eastern Ivory Coast. It is a sub-prefecture of Sandégué Department in Gontougo Region, Zanzan District.

Yorobodi was a commune until March 2012, when it became one of 1,126 communes nationwide that were abolished.

In 2014, the population of the sub-prefecture of Yorobodi was 16,708.

== Villages ==
The ten villages of the sub-prefecture of Yorobodi and their population in 2014 are:

1. Awaikro (1,977)
2. Daléwaré (1,284)
3. Kimassi (377)
4. Kobenagalé (503)
5. Kondorodougou (1,442)
6. Massadougou (3,451)
7. Sanlo (1,525)
8. Téko (785)
9. Tokanga (858)
10. Yorobodi (4,506)
