= Sandégué =

- Town, sub-prefecture, and commune
- Location in Ivory Coast
- Coordinates: 7°57′N 3°35′W
- Country: Ivory Coast
- District: Zanzan
- Region: Gontougo
- Department: Sandégué

Population (2014)
  - Total: 23,068
- Time zone: UTC+0 (GMT)

Sandégué is a town in eastern Ivory Coast. It is a sub-prefecture of and the seat of Sandégué Department in Gontougo Region, Zanzan District. Sandégué is also a commune.

In 2014, the population of the sub-prefecture of Sandégué was 23,068.

== Villages ==
The fourteen villages of the sub-prefecture of Sandégué and their population in 2014 are:

1. Sandégué (2 972)
2. Bandakagni-Sokoura (3 531)
3. Daridougou (2 784)
4. Gbangbo (944)
5. Kamelé (2 005)
6. Kassoumdougou (331)
7. Kiéti (869)
8. Kouakoukankro (1 549)
9. Logondé (371)
10. Madam (1 432)
11. Pala (1 651)
12. Sanguéhi (1 605)
13. Talahini-Sokoura (371)
14. Talahini-Tomora (2 653)
