= Tabagne =

- Town and sub-prefecture
- Location in Ivory Coast
- Coordinates: 8°0′N 3°4′W
- Country: Ivory Coast
- District: Zanzan
- Region: Gontougo
- Department: Bondoukou

Population (2014)
  - Total: 16,970
- Time zone: UTC+0 (GMT)

Tabagne is a town in northeastern Ivory Coast. It is a sub-prefecture of Bondoukou Department in Gontougo Region, Zanzan District.

Tabagne was a commune until March 2012, when it became one of 1,126 communes nationwide that were abolished.

In 2014, the population of the sub-prefecture of Tabagne was 16,970.

== Villages ==
The nineteen villages of the sub-prefecture of Tabagne and their population in 2014 are:

1. Amodi (1,032)
2. Amoitini (992)
3. Bini-Kobenan (93)
4. Damé (415)
5. Dédi (121)
6. Dingbi (1,096)
7. Gbané (483)
8. Gnomangon (210)
9. Iguéla-Pinango (595)
10. Kalom (812)
11. Kotio (316)
12. Kouafo-Ahinifié (364)
13. Kouassi-Kouman (623)
14. Magam (822)
15. Sapia (1,807)
16. Tabagne (4,950)
17. Wakiala (872)
18. Yaokokoroko (673)
19. Zéré (694)
