= Soko Airport =

Airport in Ivory Coast

- IATA: BDK; ICAO: DIBU

Summary
- Airport type: Public
- Serves: Bondoukou
- Elevation AMSL: 1,247 ft / 380 m
- Coordinates: 8°1′2″N 2°45′43″W

Map

Runways
Direction	Length		Surface
Direction	ft	m	Surface
02/20	4,940	1,505	Unpaved
- Source: Google Maps

Soko Airport (IATA: BDK, ICAO: DIBU) is an airport serving Bondoukou, Côte d'Ivoire.

== See also ==
- Transport in Côte d'Ivoire
