= Timité Sekou =

Ivorian footballer

Personal information
- Full name: Timité Oussou Sekou
- Date of birth: May 11, 1985 (age 41)
- Place of birth: Bondoukou, Ivory Coast
- Height: 1.84 m (6 ft 0 in)
- Position: Striker

Team information
- Current team: Koulayae de Blolequin

Youth career
- RC Daloa

Senior career*
| Years | Team | Apps | (Gls) |
| 2004–2005 | Issia Wazi | 27 | (15) |
| 2005–2006 | Espérance Sportive de Tunis | 19 | (7) |
| 2006–2008 | Olympique Béja | 36 | (22) |
| 2008–2009 | FC Winterthur | 4 | (5) |
| 2010–2011 | Stade Tunisien | 23 | (9) |
| 2012 | Africa Sports | 6 | (5) |
| 2012 | JS Saoura | 0 | (0) |
| 2012– | Koulayae de Blolequin | | |
- * Club domestic league appearances and goals as of 08:44, 17 February 2009 (UTC)

Timité Oussou Sekou (born 11 May 1985 in Bondoukou) is an Ivorian association footballer. He is primarily a classic centre forward but can also play as a second striker.

== Career ==
Sekou began his career with Issia Wazi in 2004. On 28 July 2005, he left the club to join Espérance Sportive de Tunis. In January 2006, he moved to Espérance's CLP-1 rivals Olympique Béja.

In Summer 2008, he left Olympique Béja and moved to Challenge League club FC Winterthur in Switzerland. After 6 months, he left to sign a contract with Stade Tunisien. Sekou returned to Ivory Coast in January 2012 to play Africa Sports. in July 2012, he was transferred to JS Saoura in Algeria.
