= Sandégué Department =

Coordinates: 7°57′N 3°35′W

Sandégué Department Département de Sandégué
- Department
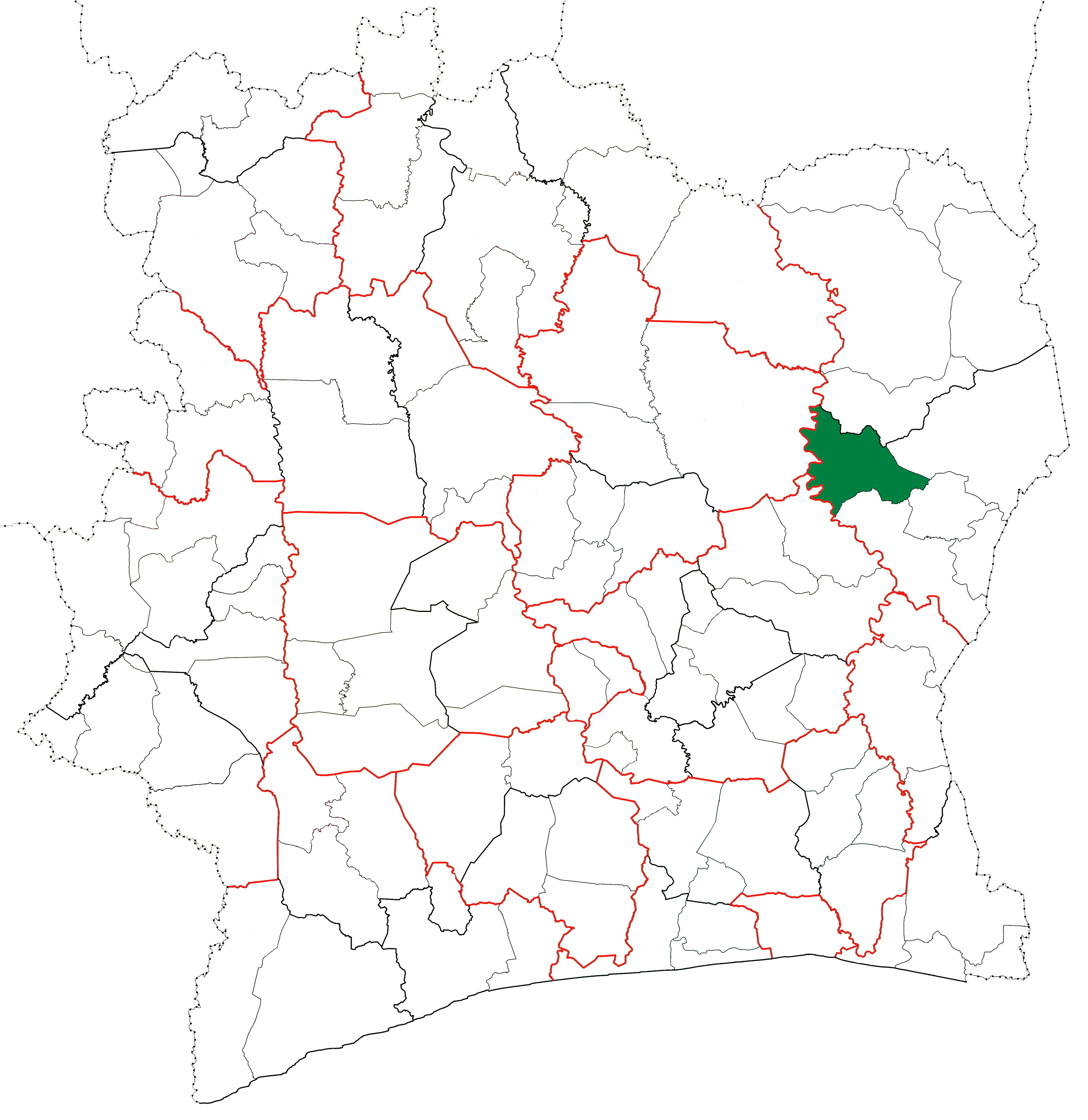
- Location in Ivory Coast. Sandégué Department has retained the same boundaries since its creation in 2009.
- Country: Ivory Coast
- District: Zanzan
- Region: Gontougo
- 2009: Established as a second-level subdivision via a division of Bondoukou Dept
- 2011: Converted to a third-level subdivision
- Departmental seat: Sandégué

Government
  - Prefect: N'Guessan Konan Edouard Siba

Area
  - Total: 2,780 km^{2} (1,070 sq mi)

Population (2021 census)
  - Total: 69,742
  - Density: 25.1/km^{2} (65.0/sq mi)
- Time zone: UTC+0 (GMT)

Sandégué Department is a department of Gontougo Region in Zanzan District, Ivory Coast. In 2021, its population was 69,742 and its seat is the settlement of Sandégué. The sub-prefectures of the department are Bandakagni-Tomora, Dimandougou, Sandégué, and Yorobodi.

== History ==
Sandégué Department was created in 2009 as a second-level subdivision via a split-off from Bondoukou Department. At its creation, it was part of Zanzan Region.

In 2011, districts were introduced as new first-level subdivisions of Ivory Coast. At the same time, regions were reorganised and became second-level subdivisions and all departments were converted into third-level subdivisions. At this time, Sandégué Department became part of Gontougo Region in Zanzan District.
