= Bondoukou Department =

Coordinates: 8°2′N 2°48′W

Bondoukou Department Département de Bondoukou
- Department
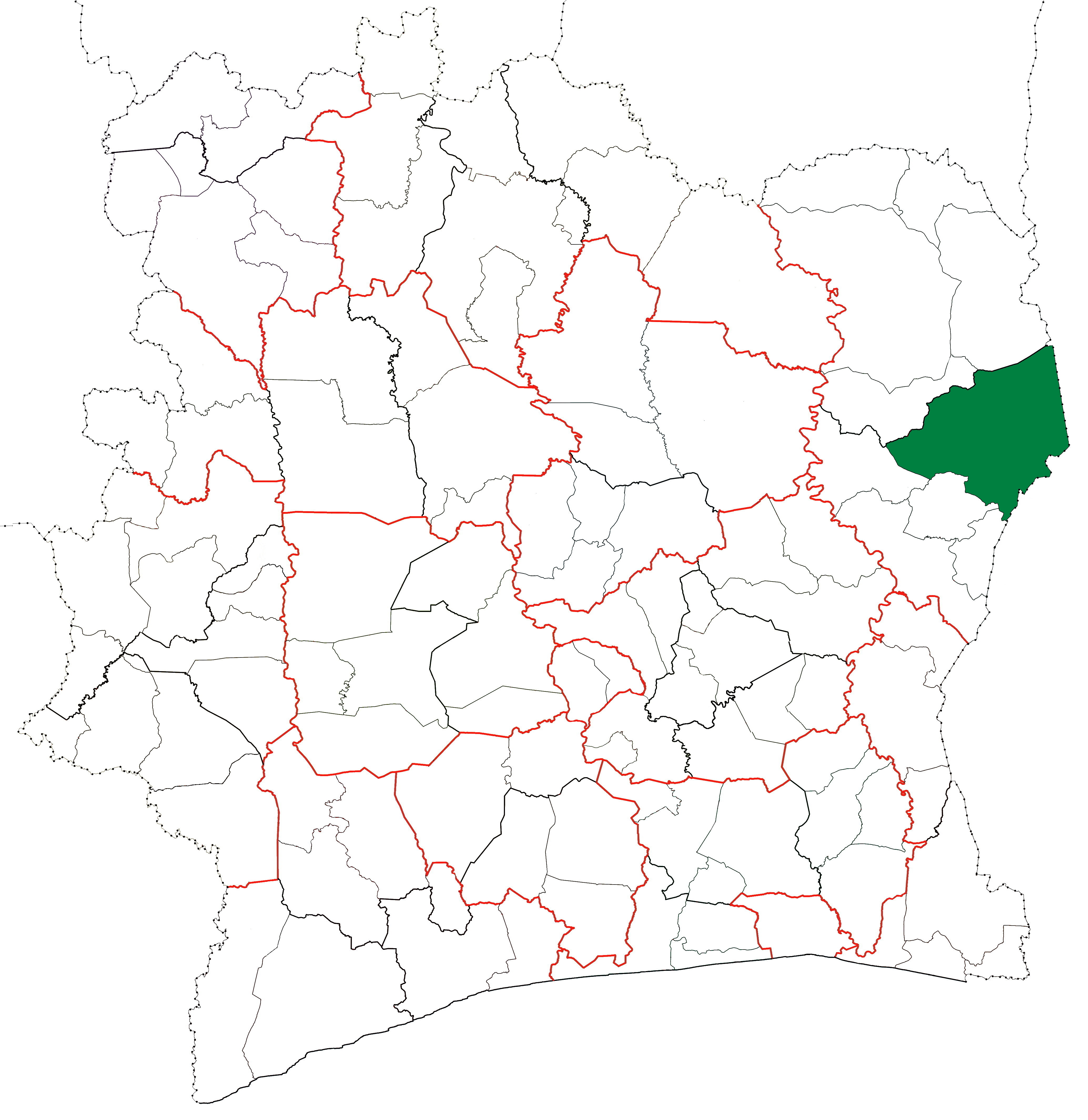
- Location in Ivory Coast. Bondoukou Department has had these boundaries since 2009.
- Country: Ivory Coast
- District: Zanzan
- Region: Gontougo
- 1969: Established as a first-level subdivision
- 1974: Divided to create Bouna Dept
- 1988: Divided to create Tanda Dept
- 1997: Converted to a second-level subdivision
- 2009: Divided to create Sandégué Dept
- 2011: Converted to a third-level subdivision
- Departmental seat: Bondoukou

Government
  - Prefect: François Germain Goun

Area
  - Total: 6,930 km^{2} (2,680 sq mi)

Population (2021 census)
  - Total: 453,841
  - Density: 65.5/km^{2} (170/sq mi)
- Time zone: UTC+0 (GMT)

Bondoukou Department is a department of Gontougo Region in Zanzan District, Ivory Coast. In 2021, its population was 453,841 and its seat is the settlement of Bondoukou. The sub-prefectures of the department are Appimandoum, Bondo, Bondoukou, Gouméré, Laoudi-Ba, Pinda-Boroko, Sapli-Sépingo, Sorobango, Tabagne, Tagadi, Taoudi, and Yézimala. It is the easternmost department of Ivory Coast.

== History ==
Boundoukou Department was created in 1969 as one of the 24 new departments that were created to take the place of the six departments that were being abolished. It was created from territory that was formerly part of Est Department. Using current boundaries as a reference, from 1969 to 1974 the department occupied the same territory that is today Zanzan District.

In 1974, Boundoukou Department was divided to create Bouna Department. From 1974 to 1988, Bondoukou Department occupied the same territory that is today Gontougo Region. In 1988, Boundoukou Department was divided a second time to create Tanda Department.

In 1997, regions were introduced as new first-level subdivisions of Ivory Coast; as a result, all departments were converted into second-level subdivisions. Bondoukou Department was included as part of Zanzan Region.

Boundoukou Department was divided a third time in 2009 to create Sandégué Department.

In 2011, districts were introduced as new first-level subdivisions of Ivory Coast. At the same time, regions were reorganised and became second-level subdivisions and all departments were converted into third-level subdivisions. At this time, Boundoukou Department became part of Gontougo Region in Zanzan District.

=== Maps of historical boundaries ===
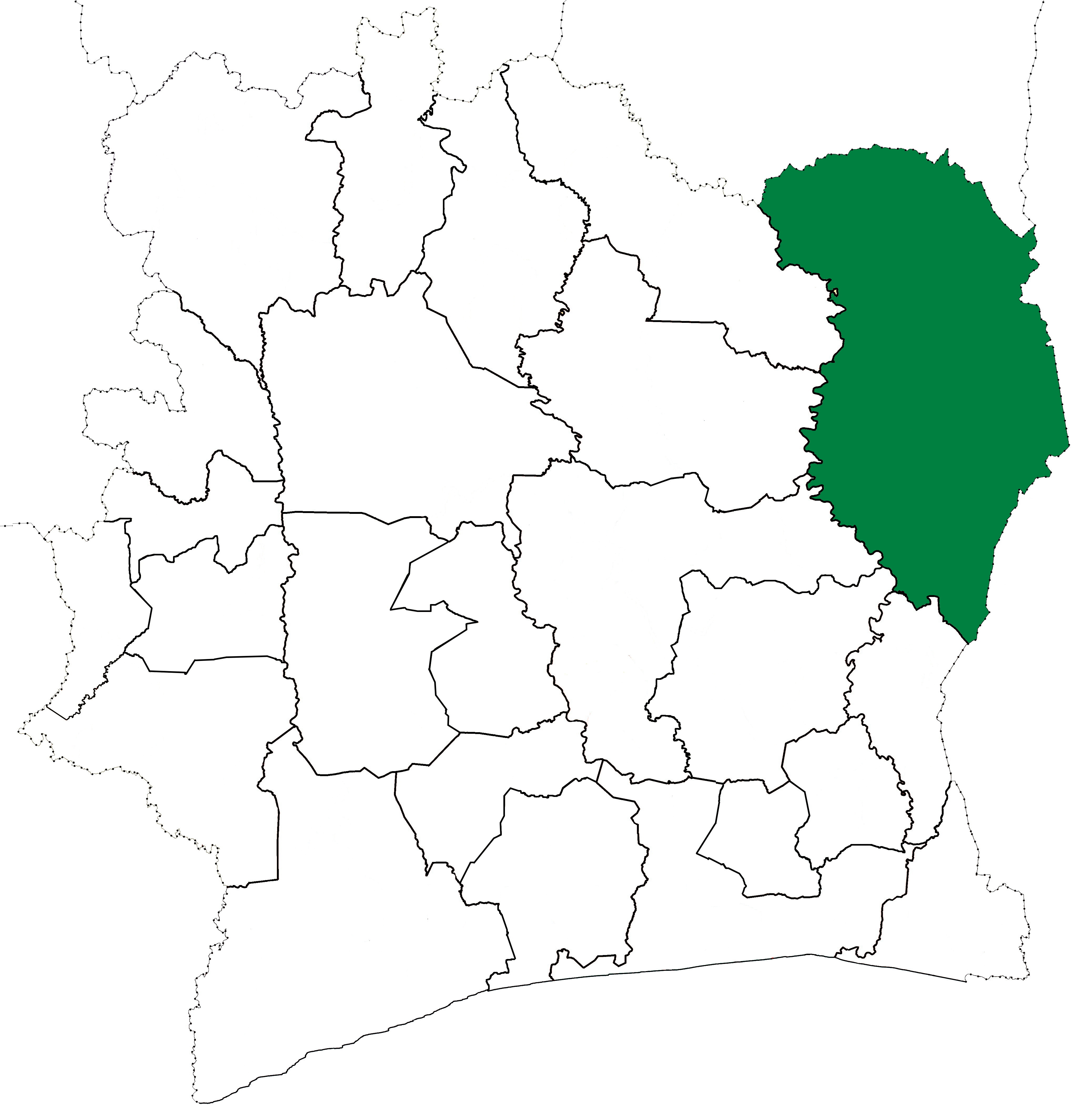
Bondoukou Department upon its creation in 1969. It kept these boundaries until 1974, when it became one of the first of the 24 new departments to be divided.

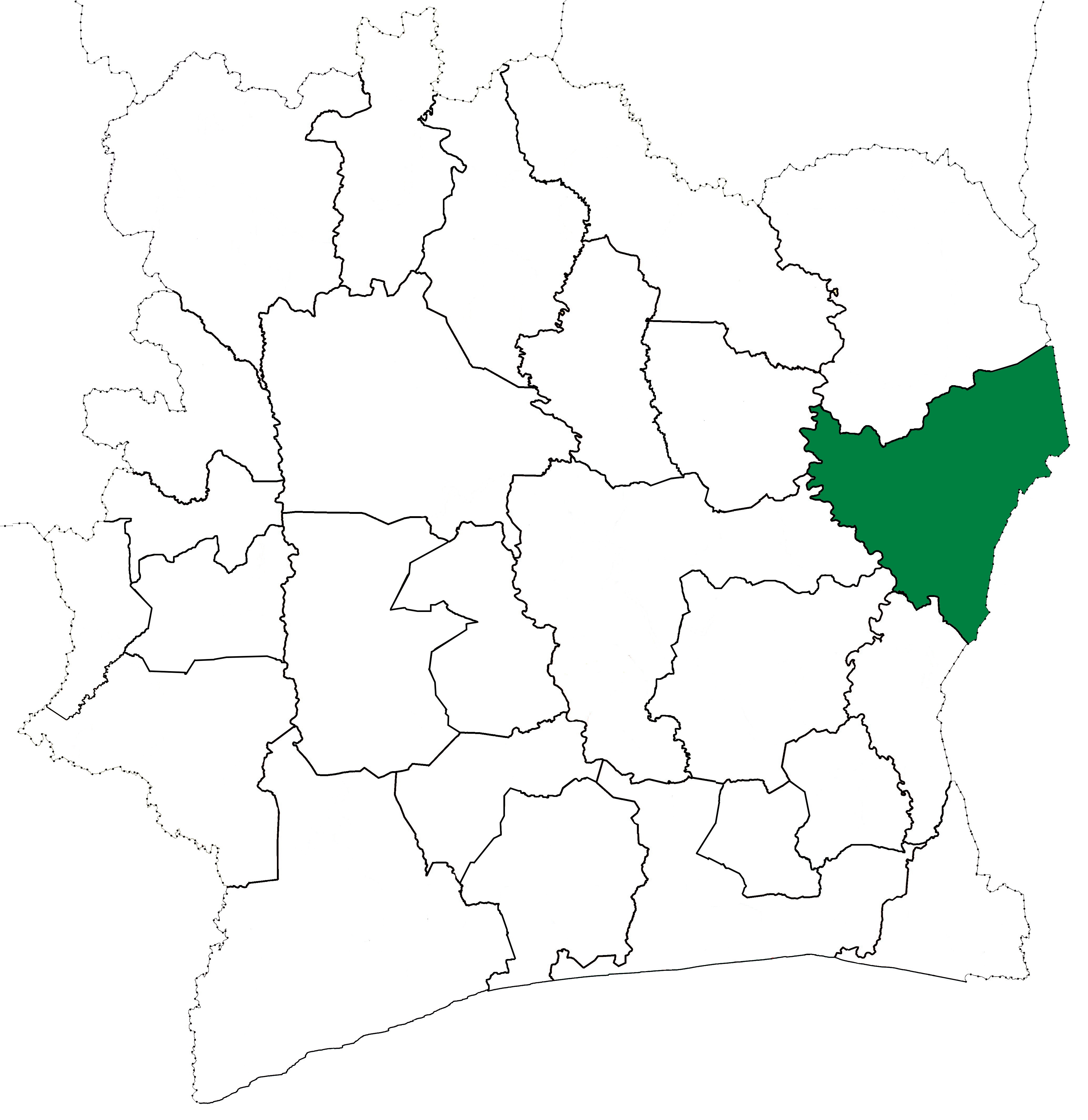
Bondoukou Department from 1974 to 1988. (Other departments began to be divided in 1980.)

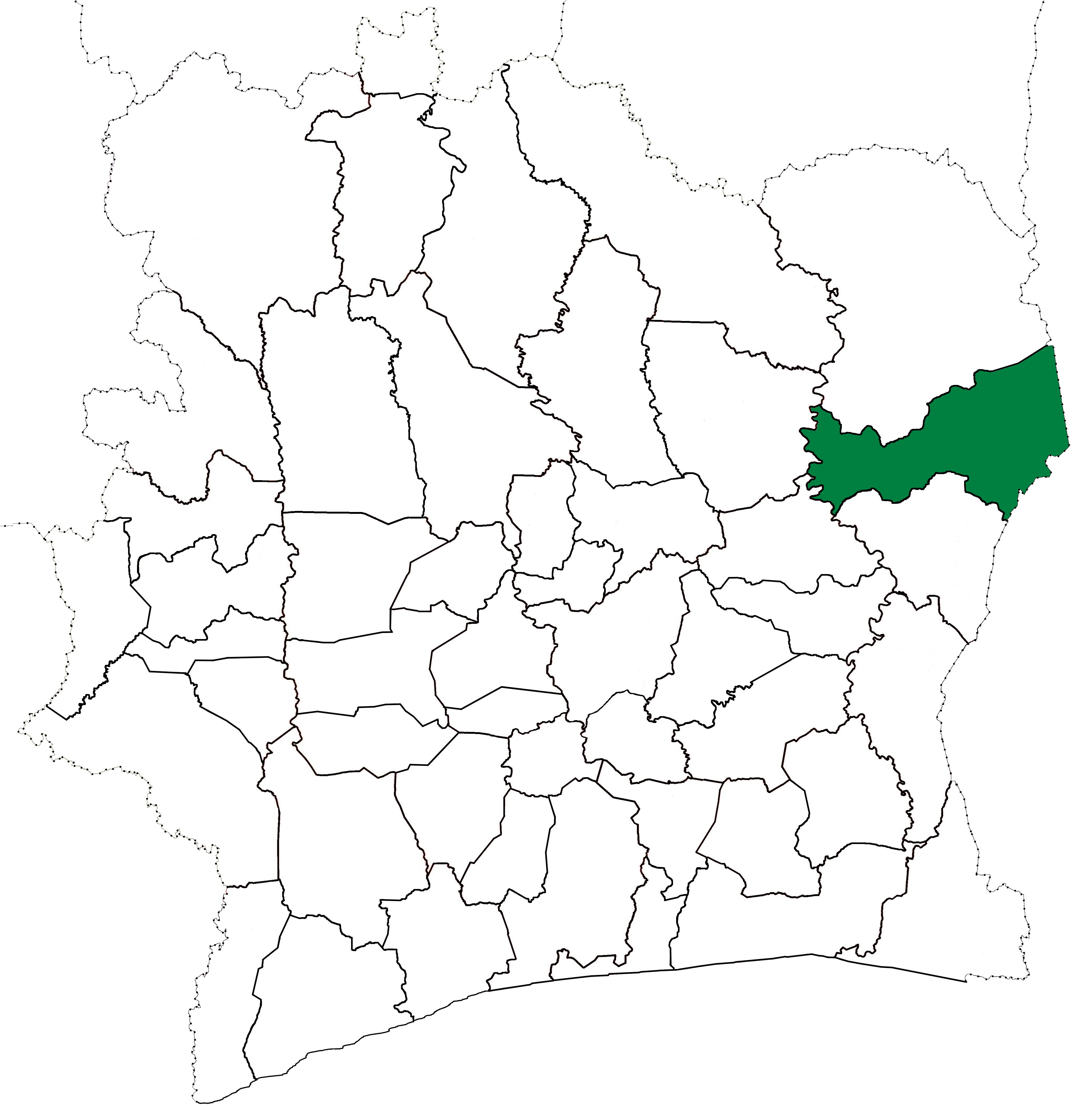
Bondoukou Department from 1988 to 2009. (Other subdivision boundaries began to change in 1995.)
