= Gontougo =

Coordinates: 8°2′N 2°47′W

Gontougo Region Région du Gontougo
- Region
- Seal
- Motto(s): "Union, fraternité, développement"
- Location of Gontougo Region in Ivory Coast
- Country: Ivory Coast
- District: Zanzan
- Established: 2011
- Regional seat: Bondoukou

Government
  - Prefect: François Germain Goun
  - Council President: Kouassi Ignace Kossonou

Area
  - Total: 16,100 km^{2} (6,200 sq mi)

Population (2021 census)
  - Total: 917,828
  - Density: 57.0/km^{2} (148/sq mi)
- Time zone: UTC+0 (GMT)

Gontougo Region is one of the 31 regions of Ivory Coast. Since its establishment in 2011, it has been one of two regions in Zanzan District. The seat of the region is Bondoukou and the region's population in the 2021 census was 917,828.

Gontougo is currently divided into five departments: Bondoukou, Koun-Fao, Sandégué, Tanda, and Transua.
