= Ouenra Peuhl =

Coordinates: 9°53′17″N 2°59′59″E

- Village
- Interactive map of Ouenra Peuhl
- Country: Benin
- Department: Borgou Department
- Commune: Nikki
- Arrondissement: Sérékalé

Population (2013)
  - Total: 1,570
- Time zone: UTC+1 (WAT)

Ouenra Peuhl is a town in the Sérékalé arrondissement in the Borgou Department of Benin. It is an administrative division under the jurisdiction of the commune of Nikki. According to the population census in 2013, the village had a total population of 1,570.
