= Guèma =

Coordinates: 9°57′47″N 2°59′26″E

- Arrondissement and town
- Interactive map of Guèma
- Country: Benin
- Department: Borgou Department
- Commune: Nikki
- Arrondissements: Gnonkourakali

Population (2013)
  - Total: 1,463
- Time zone: UTC+1 (WAT)

Guèma, also known as Guinma, is a town in the Gnonkourakali arrondissement in the Borgou Department of Benin. It is an administrative division under the jurisdiction of the commune of Nikki. According to the population census in 2013, the village had a total population of 1,463.
