= Chein Daroukpara =

Coordinates: 09°49′57″N 03°01′30″E

- Arrondissement and town
- Interactive map of Chein Daroukpara
- Country: Benin
- Department: Borgou Department
- Commune: Nikki

Population (2013)
  - Total: 1,145
- Time zone: UTC+1 (WAT)

Chein Daroukpara, also known as Chindaroukpara, is a town in the Suya arrondissement in the Borgou Department of Benin. It is an administrative division under the jurisdiction of the commune of Nikki. According to the population census in 2013, the village had a total population of 1,145.
