= Nekinparo =

- Village
- Location in Benin
- Coordinates: 9°16′N 2°36′E
- Country: Benin
- Department: Borgou Department
- Commune: Parakou
- Time zone: UTC+1 (WAT)

Nekinparo is a village in the commune of Parakou in the Borgou Department of central-eastern Benin. It is located south of Parakou city centre along the RNIE 2 highway.
