= Tourou International Airport =

Tourou International Airport Aeroport International de Tourou
- IATA: none; ICAO: none

Summary
- Airport type: Defunct
- Owner: Government of Benin
- Operator: Société des Aéroports du Bénin
- Serves: Parakou
- Location: Tankaro, Borgou Department, Benin
- Hub for: Benin Airlines
- Elevation AMSL: 1,207 ft / 368 m
- Coordinates: 9°23′30.3″N 2°30′27.6″E

Map

Runways
Direction	Length		Surface
Direction	m	ft	Surface
04/22	3,300	10,827	Asphalt

Tourou International Airport (French: Aeroport International de Tourou), is an airport intended to serve the city of Parakou, Benin. The airport is located about 12 kilometres (7.5 miles) southeast of the city center.

== Overview ==
The airport was reported to enter service in 2016. However, subsequent government reports in 2023 indicated that the project faced abandonment or indefinite postponement due to its failure to meet specific security requirements for international operationalization. Hence, as of March 2026, the airport remains closed.

== Facilities ==
The airport facility includes a completed terminal building, control tower, technical block, and power station. The single runway measures 3300 m long and 45 m wide. However, the facility was never used since its completion in 2016.

== Airlines and Destinations ==
The airport currently does not have any commercial flights.
