= Bouassi =

Coordinates: 9°54′13″N 3°10′44″E

- Arrondissement and town
- Interactive map of Bouassi
- Country: Benin
- Department: Borgou Department
- Commune: Nikki

Population (2013)
  - Total: 2,298
- Time zone: UTC+1 (WAT)

Bouassi, also known as Baoussi and Gbaoussi, is a town in the Nikki arrondissement in the Borgou Department of Benin. It is an administrative division under the jurisdiction of the commune of Nikki. According to the 2013 census, the population was 2,298.
