= Gbari, Benin =

Coordinates: 10°00′36″N 02°55′35″E

Gbari
- Arrondissement and town
- Interactive map of Gbari
- Country: Benin
- Department: Borgou Department
- Commune: Nikki

Population (2013)
  - Total: 3,136
- Time zone: UTC+1 (WAT)

Gbari is a town in the Gnonkourakali arrondissement in the Borgou Department of Benin. It is an administrative division under the jurisdiction of the commune of Nikki. According to the population census in 2013, the village had a total population of 3,136.
