= Guinrou Peulh =

Coordinates: 9°58′26″N 02°57′10″E

Guinrou Peuhl
- Arrondissement and town
- Interactive map of Guinrou Peuhl
- Country: Benin
- Department: Borgou Department
- Commune: Nikki

Population (2013)
  - Total: 1,850
- Time zone: UTC+1 (WAT)

Guinrou Peuhl is a town in the Gnonkourakali arrondissement in the Borgou Department of Benin. It is an administrative division under the jurisdiction of the commune of Nikki. According to the population census in 2013, the village had a total population of 1,850.
