= Parakou Airport =

Airport in Borgou, Benin

- IATA: PKO; ICAO: DBBP

Summary
- Airport type: Public
- Serves: Parakou
- Location: Benin
- Elevation AMSL: 1,289 ft / 393 m
- Coordinates: 9°21′25.6″N 2°36′33.2″E

Map
- Location of Parakou Airport in Benin

Runways
Direction	Length		Surface
Direction	m	ft	Surface
04/22	1,600	5,250	DIRT
- Source: Landings.com

Parakou Airport (IATA: PKO, ICAO: DBBP) is a public use airport located 1 km northwest of Parakou, Borgou, Benin. It is to be replaced by the Tourou International Airport, a new airport in Tankaro, about 10 km northwest of Parakou, which will feature an asphalt runway 3,500 m (3,800 yd; 11,500 ft) in length. The new airport entered service on 18 March 2016.

== Airlines and destinations ==
Airlines	Destinations
Benin Airlines	Cotonou
