= Ouénou =

Ouénou may refer to several places in Benin:

- Ouénou, N'Dali
- Ouénou, Nikki
