= Gah Maro =

- Arrondissement and town
- Location in Benin
- Coordinates: 09°56′08″N 03°12′20″E
- Country: Benin
- Department: Borgou Department
- Commune: Nikki

Population (2013)
  - Total: 3,950
- Time zone: UTC+1 (WAT)

Gah Maro is a town in the Nikki arrondissement in the Borgou Department of Benin. It is an administrative division under the jurisdiction of the commune of Nikki. According to the population census in 2013, the village had a total population of 3,950.
