= Tanakpé =

Coordinates: 9°42′52″N 3°13′48″E

- Arrondissement and town
- Interactive map of Tanakpé
- Country: Benin
- Department: Borgou Department
- Commune: Nikki

Population (2013)
  - Total: 812
- Time zone: UTC+1 (WAT)

Tanakpé is a town in the Tasso arrondissement in the Borgou Department of Benin. It is an administrative division under the jurisdiction of the commune of Nikki. According to the population census in 2013, the village had a total population of 812.
