= Oroumon =

Coordinates: 9°52′49″N 3°19′54″E

- Arrondissement and town
- Interactive map of Oroumon
- Country: Benin
- Department: Borgou Department
- Commune: Nikki

Population (2013)
  - Total: 957
- Time zone: UTC+1 (WAT)

Oroumon, also known as Ouroumon, is a town in the Ouenou arrondissement in the Borgou Department of Benin. It is an administrative division under the jurisdiction of the commune of Nikki. According to the population census in 2013, the village had a total population of 957.
