= Chein =

Coordinates: 9°45′17″N 3°14′42″E

- Arrondissement and town
- Interactive map of Chein
- Country: Benin
- Department: Borgou Department
- Commune: Nikki

Population (2013)
  - Total: 1,551
- Time zone: UTC+1 (WAT)

Chein is a town in the Tasso arrondissement in the Borgou Department of Benin. It is an administrative division under the jurisdiction of the commune of Nikki. According to the population census in 2013, the village had a total population of 1,551.
