= Guéra =

Guéra or Guera may refer to:

- Guéra Prefecture, a former first-level administrative division of Chad until 1999
- Guéra Region, a first-level administrative division of Chad since 2002
- Guéra Department, a second level administrative division of Guéra Region, Chad
- Kperou Guera, a village in Parakou subdistrict, Borgou Department, Benin
- La Guera, a town in Western Sahara, also known as Lagouira
- R. M. Guéra (born 1959), a Serbian comic book author and illustrator
