= Alafiarou =

- Arrondissement and town
- Location in Benin
- Coordinates: 9°54′N 3°25′E
- Country: Benin
- Department: Borgou Department
- Commune: Tchaourou
- Time zone: UTC+1 (WAT)

Alafiarou is a town and arrondissement located in the commune of Tchaourou in the Borgou Department of Benin.
