= Wansirou =

- Village
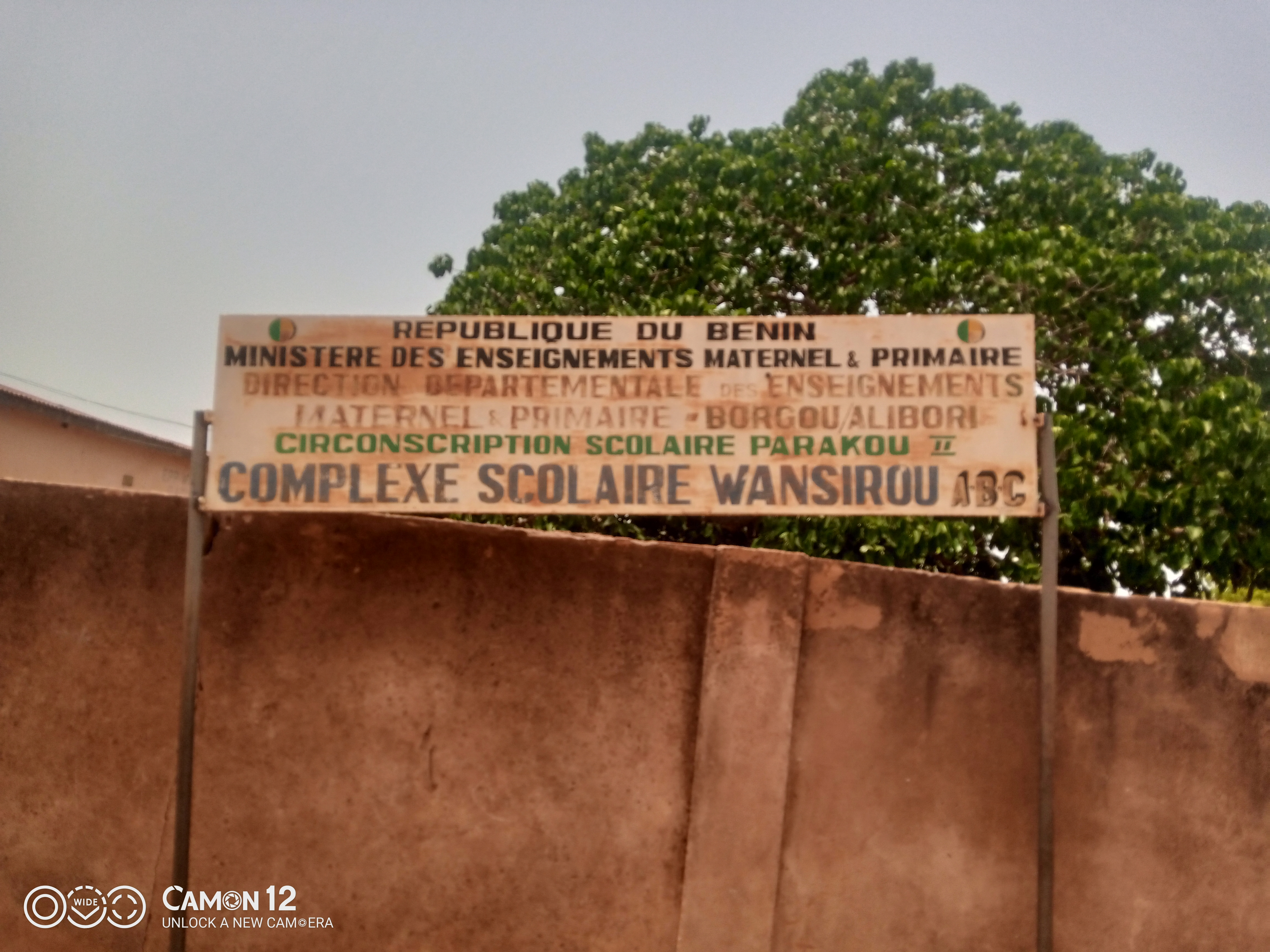

- Location in Benin
- Coordinates: 9°22′N 2°37′E
- Country: Benin
- Department: Borgou Department
- Commune: Parakou
- Elevation: 1,188 ft (362 m)
- Time zone: UTC+1 (WAT)

Wansirou is a village in the commune of Parakou in the Borgou Department of central-eastern Benin. It is located north of Parakou city centre.
