= Seidou =

Seidou is both a given name and a surname. Notable people with the name include:

- Séidou Barazé (born 1990), Beninese footballer
- Seidou Idrissa (born 1985), Nigerien footballer
- Seidou Njimoluh Njoya (1902–1992), Cameroonian ruler
- Seïdou Mama Sika (born 1949), Beninese politician
- Alassane Seidou, Beninese politician
- Edson Seidou (born 1991), French footballer
- Fabrice Seidou (born 1986), Ivorian footballer
- Samou Seidou Adambi, Beninese politician
