= Sanson, Benin =

Coordinates: 9°17′N 2°26′E

Sanson
- Arrondissement and town
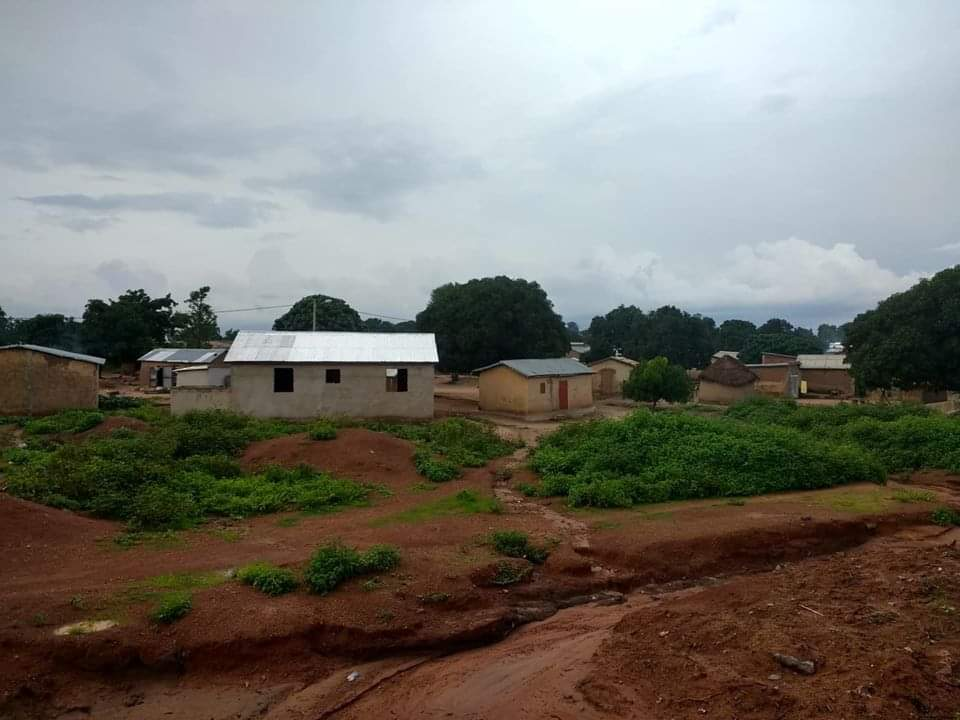
- View of Sanson from the highway
- Interactive map of Sanson
- Country: Benin
- Department: Borgou Department
- Commune: Tchaourou

Population (2002)
  - Total: 10,784
- Time zone: UTC+1 (WAT)

Sanson is a town and arrondissement in the Borgou Department of Benin. It is an administrative division under the jurisdiction of the commune of Tchaourou. According to the population census conducted by the Institut National de la Statistique Benin on February 15, 2002, the arrondissement had a total population of 10,784.

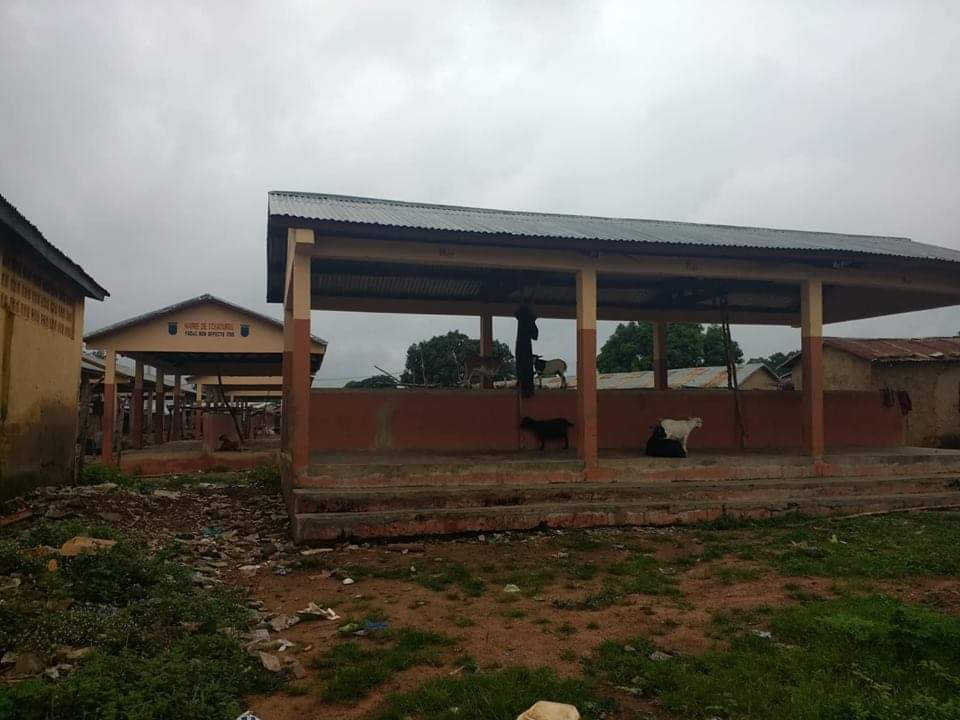
Sanson market
