= Tchaourou =

- Commune and city
- Location in Benin
- Coordinates: 8°53′N 2°36′E
- Country: Benin
- Department: Borgou Department

Area
  - Total: 2,802 sq mi (7,256 km^{2})

Population (2013)
  - Total: 221,108
- Time zone: UTC+1 (WAT)

Tchaourou [tʃa.u.ʁu] etymology, meaning rattle) is a commune, arrondissement, and city located in the Borgou Department of Benin, a country in Western Africa, formerly known as Dahomey (until 1975). It is the birthplace of former Beninese president Yayi Boni. It is 50 kilometres (31 mi) south of Parakou.

The commune covers an area of 7,256 km^{2} (2,802 sq mi) and as of 2013 had a population of 221,108 people., while the Tchaourou city proper has a population of 106,852 people, making it the 10th largest settlement in Benin.

== Climate ==
Climate data for Tchaourou
Month	Jan	Feb	Mar	Apr	May	Jun	Jul	Aug	Sep	Oct	Nov	Dec	Year
Mean daily maximum °C (°F)	34 (94)	36 (96)	36 (96)	34 (94)	33 (91)	31 (88)	28 (83)	27 (81)	29 (85)	31 (87)	33 (91)	34 (93)	32 (90)
Mean daily minimum °C (°F)	19 (67)	22 (71)	23 (73)	23 (73)	22 (72)	22 (71)	21 (70)	21 (69)	21 (70)	21 (69)	21 (69)	18 (64)	21 (70)
Average precipitation mm (inches)	7.6 (0.3)	15 (0.6)	58 (2.3)	100 (4.1)	140 (5.6)	160 (6.3)	170 (6.5)	160 (6.4)	210 (8.4)	160 (6.3)	15 (0.6)	7.6 (0.3)	1,210 (47.7)
Source: Weatherbase

== Demographics ==
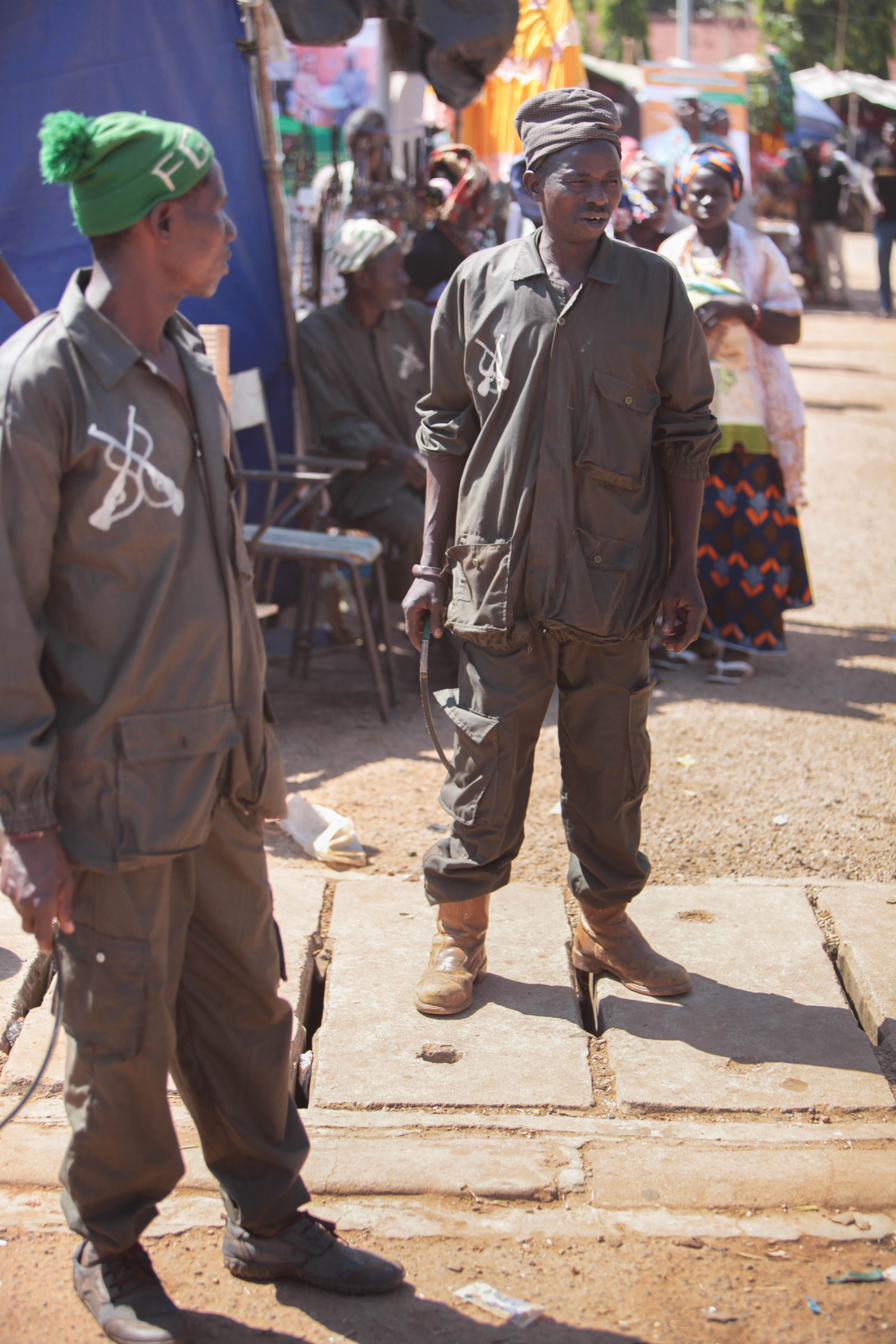
Hunters of Tchaourou.

The main languages of Tchaourou are Bariba, Fula (Fula: Fulfulde; French: Peul), Yoruba, Otamari and Yom Lokpa.

== Administration ==
The commune is divided administratively into 7 arrondissements, in 5 quarters and 31 villages.

Subdivisions de Tchaourou
Arrondissements	Quartiers & villages
Tchaourou	Tchalla, Oke Lagba
Alafiarou	
Bétérou	
Goro	
Kika	
Sanson	
Tchatchou	
