= Tinekonparou =

- Village
- Location in Benin
- Coordinates: 9°20′N 2°43′E
- Country: Benin
- Department: Borgou Department
- Commune: Parakou
- Time zone: UTC+1 (WAT)

Tinekonparou is a village in the commune of Parakou in the Borgou Department in central-eastern Benin. It is located east of Parakou city centre.
