= Bétérou =

- Town
- Location in Benin
- Coordinates: 9°12′N 2°16′E
- Country: Benin
- Department: Borgou Department
- Commune: Tchaourou

Population (2009)
  - Total: 15,236
- Time zone: UTC+1 (WAT)

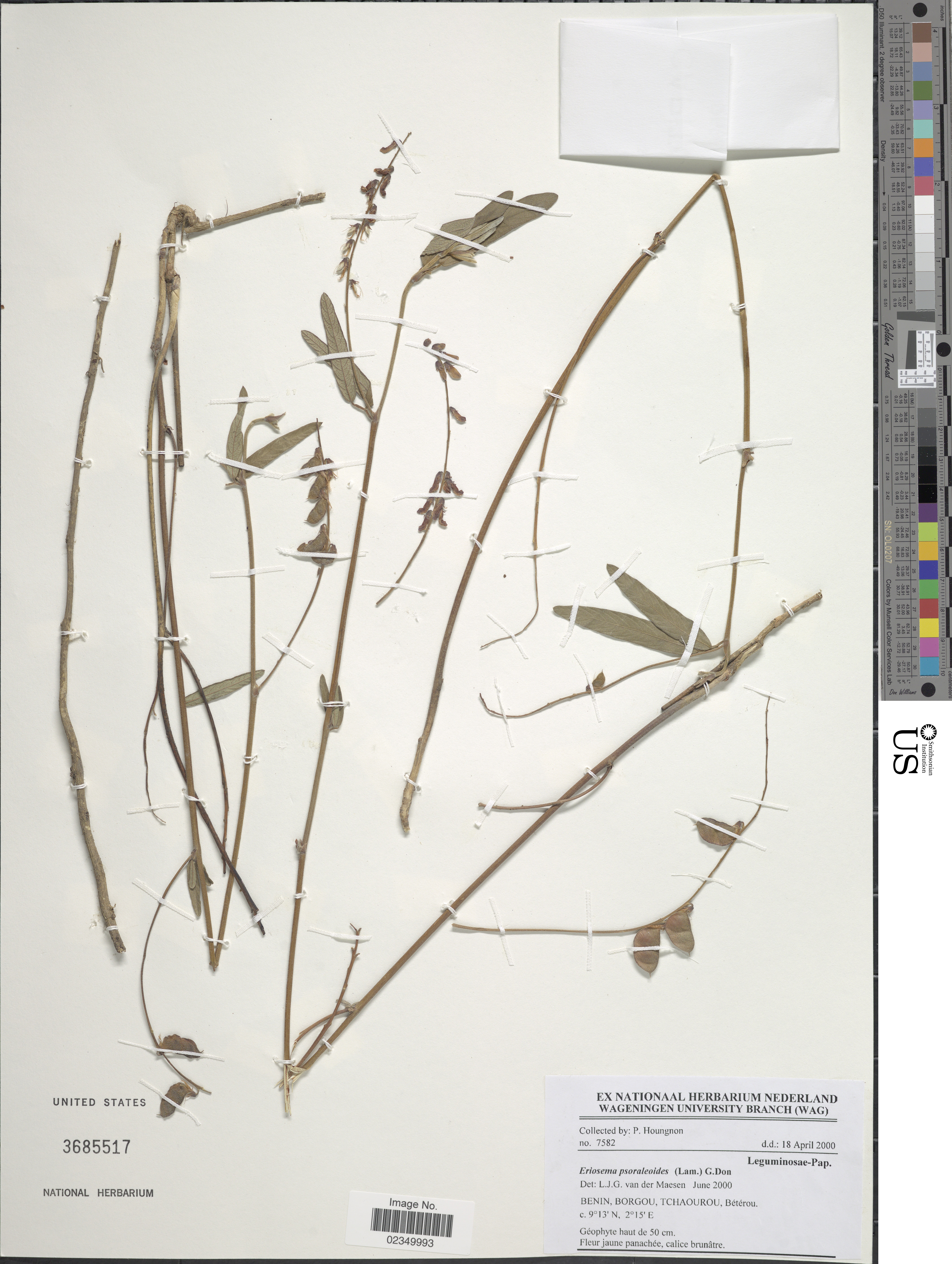

Bétérou is a town and arrondissement located in the Borgou Department of central Benin. As of 2009 it had an estimated population of 15,236.
