= Tassilo =

Tassilo – also spelled Thassilo – is a male name of West Germanic origin. It is the diminutive form of the name Tasso/Tazzo. Tasso/Tazzo itself is the diminutive form of Taginbert, which is of West Germanic origin and means "glittering as the day". The components of Taginbert are the Old High German words tag (day) and beraht (glittering). The Proto-Germanic roots of the components are "dagaz" (day) and "berhtaz" (bright) and the name Taginbert corresponds to the common Frankish name Dagobert.

Tassilo may refer to:

- Tassilo I of Bavaria (died c. 610)
- Tassilo II of Bavaria (died c. 719)
- Tassilo III, Duke of Bavaria (died c. 796)
- Tassilone (1709), an opera by Agostino Steffani (1653–1728)
- Tassilo von Heydebrand und der Lasa (1818–1899), German chess master
- Prince Tassilo Festetics von Tolna (1850–1933), Hungarian nobleman
- Tassilo Thierbach (1956–2025), German figure-skater
- Prince Tassilo of Bulgaria (born 2002), son of Kyril, Prince of Preslav, grandson of former Tsar Simeon II of Bulgaria
