= Sota River =

Coordinates: 11.875°N 3.406°E

Sota
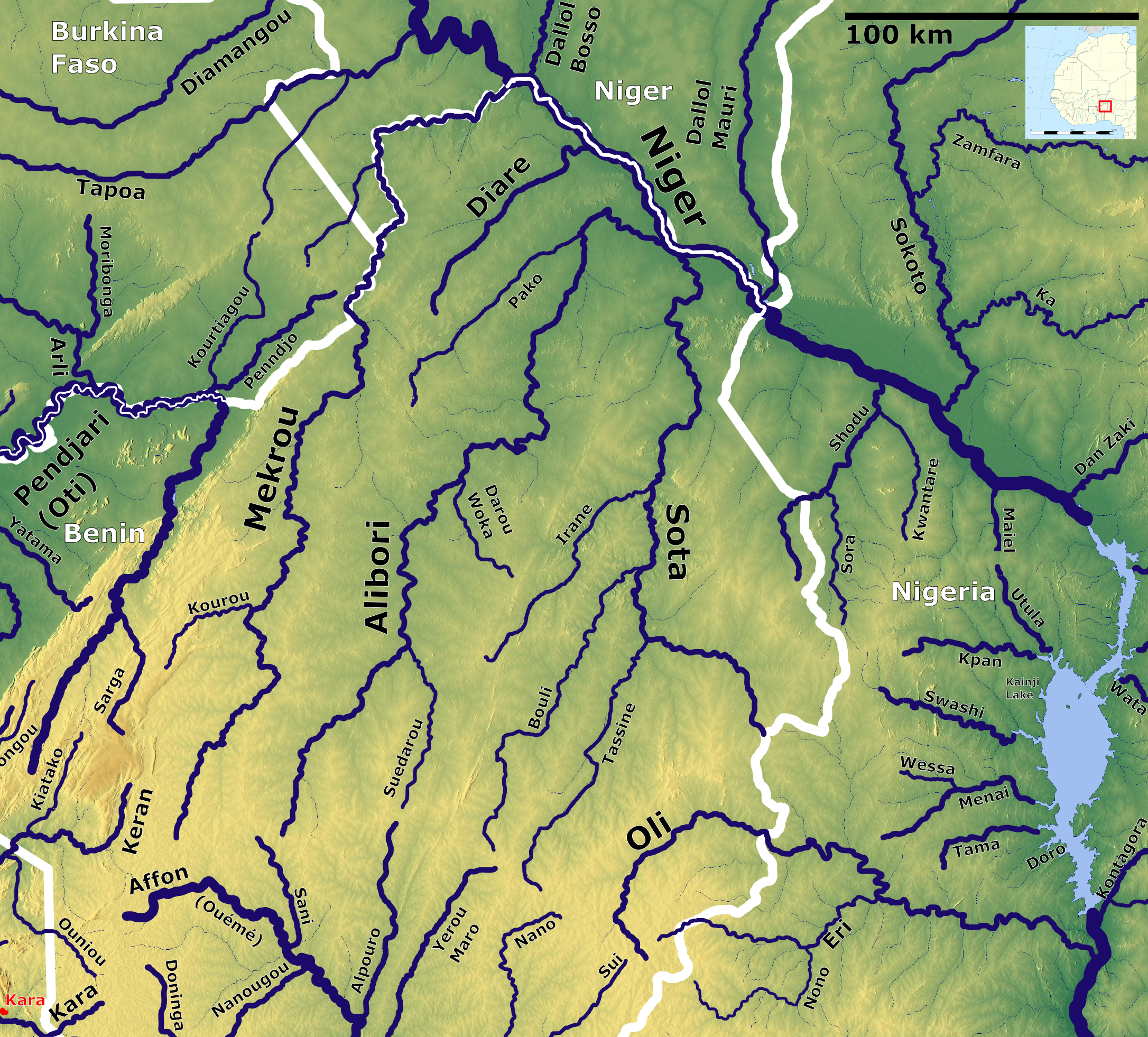
- North Benin with the Sota in the center

Location
- Country: Benin

Physical characteristics
- Source
  - location: Near Ndali, Benin, Borgou Department
- Mouth
  - location: Niger River at Malanville
- Length: 250 km (160 mi)
- Basin size: 13,650 km^{2} (5,270 sq mi)
- Discharge
  - average: 31 m^{3}/s (1,100 cu ft/s)

The Sota is a river of northern Benin flowing through the departments of Borgou and Alibori. It is a tributary of the Niger River and the Tassiné River is one of its tributaries. The river is approximately 250 km (160 mi) in length and covers a basin area of 13,650 km^{2} (5,270 sq mi).

== Geography ==
The Sota rises northeast of the town of Ndali in the Borgou Department. The river runs toward the north-north-east and empties into the Niger River at Malanville.

== Rainfall ==
The annual precipitation has been recorded at several stations in the basin of the Sota:

- Segbana (center-east of the basin, near the Nigerian border): 1,177.4 mm (46.35 in) spread over 53 days.
- Kandi (center-west of the basin): 1,055.1 mm (41.54 in), spread over 80 days
- Malanville (at the north end of the basin at the confluence with Niger): 919.9 mm (36.22 in) in 53 days

There is everywhere a large surplus rainfall from July to September (boreal summer), giving rise to violent floods, but the deficit is a severe dry season from December to April.

== Hydrometry ==
The flow of the river has been observed for 40 years (1953–1992) at the hydro station in Couberi, located near its confluence with the Niger River at Malanville.

At Couberi, the average annual flow module or observed during this period was 31 m^{3}/s (1,100 cu ft/s) for an area taking into account 9,111 to 13,410 km^{2} (3,518 to 5,178 sq mi). The monthly average flows observed from February to April are from 3.7–3.9 m^{3}/s (130–140 cu ft/s), which is quite remarkable in Africa at its discretion, with other rivers in the region falling consistently enough to nearly dry up in the dry season. It is true that the level of rainfall of 900–1,200 mm (35–47 in) per year is very consistent. On the observation period of 40 years, the minimum monthly flow was 2 m^{3}/s (71 cu ft/s) while the maximum monthly flow amounted to 358 m^{3}/s (12,600 cu ft/s) which is more than the average flow of the Seine in Paris.

Average monthly flows of Sota (m^{3}/s (cu ft/s)) measured at the hydrometric station Couberi. (Data calculated over 40 years)
