= PKO =

PKO may refer to:

- PKO; rap group from San Antonio, Texas,
- Peacekeeping organization;
- PKO Bank Polski (also PKO BP), the Polish bank Powszechna Kasa Oszczędności Bank Polski Spółka Akcyjna;
- Bank Pekao, the Polish bank Bank Polska Kasa Opieki Spółka Akcyjna;
- Protect Kahoʻolawe Ohana, a native Hawaiʻian activist organization;
- the IATA call letters for Parakou Airport in Benin.
