= Chouk =

Chouk may refer to:

- Chowk (film) a film due to be released in 2023
- Choukachou, Beninese millet beer
- Çük, Tatar holiday
