= Bori, Benin =

Bori
- Arrondissement and town
- Location in Benin
- Coordinates: 9°45′N 2°26′E
- Country: Benin
- Department: Borgou Department
- Commune: N’Dali
- Arrondissement: Bori
- Time zone: UTC+1 (WAT)

Bori is a town and arrondissement located in the N’Dali commune of the Borgou Department of Benin.
