= Sourou =

Sourou may refer to:

- Sourou Province, Burkina Faso
- Sourou River, Burkina Faso
- Sourou, Benin
