= Tasso =

Tasso may refer to:

== People ==
- Torquato Tasso, Italian 16th-century poet, author of Gerusalemme liberata
  - Tasso, Lament and Triumph, a symphonic poem by Franz Liszt based on the poet
  - Torquato Tasso, a play by Goethe based on the life of the poet
- Bernardo Tasso, his father, also a poet
- Faustino Tasso, Italian monk and poet
- Henri Tasso, French politician
- Takuya Tasso, the governor of Iwate Prefecture in Japan
- Tasso Jereissati, Brazilian politician
- Tasso of Friuli, early 7th-century Lombard duke

== Places ==
- Tasso, Corse-du-Sud, a commune on Corsica, France
- Tasso Island, in the Sierra Leone River
- Tasso River, a river in Mumbai, India
- Tasso, Tennessee, an unincorporated community in Bradley County, Tennessee
- Tasso, Lumarzo, Genova, Liguria, Italy, a village (frazione) within the community (comune) of Lumarzo in Genoa province, Italy
- Tasso, a portion of the Sagittario (river)
- Tasso, Benin, a town and arrondissement in Benin

== Other uses ==
- TASSO, the name of a particle detector and the group of physicists working with it
- Tasso (horse), an American Thoroughbred racehorse
- Tasso (meat product) or Tasso ham, a specialty of Cajun cuisine
