= Wagasi =

Type of cheese

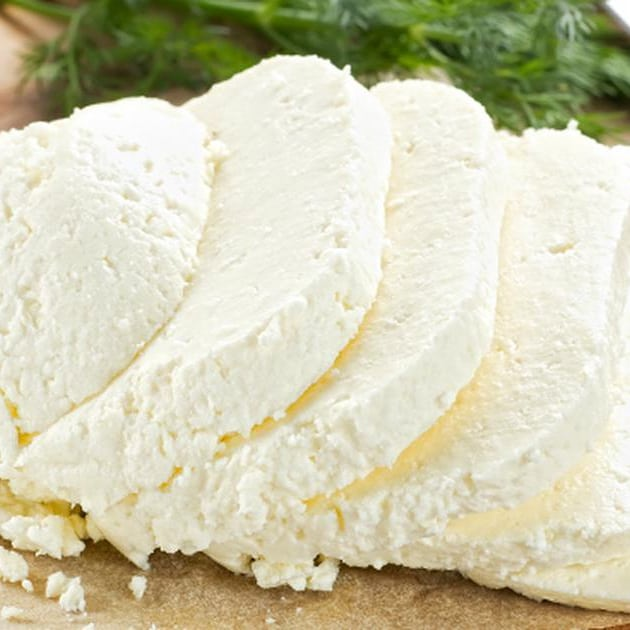
Wagasi

Wagasi is a type of West African cheese made from cow's milk. It is commonly made in northern Benin. It is sold in abundance in Parakou, a city in central Benin. It is also found across West African countries, particularly in the savanna zone on the latitude of Parakou.

It is commonly known as wagasi in the Zarma-Songhai and Dendi languages, amo in the Fon language, wara and warakashi in Nagot and Yoruba language and gasaru in Bariba language. The French also call it fromage. In Ghana it is also widely known as wagashi.

It is relatively soft in texture and mild in flavor and is frequently used in cooking. As with many proteins and animal products used in Beninese foods, wagasi tends to be cooked and served in a sauce which is then eaten with a starch, such as pounded yams or pâte, the millet or maize 'porridge' staple of the area (tuwo [Hausa] or t.z. [acronym from Hausa tuwon zafi; hot 'porridge']) in English-speaking areas.

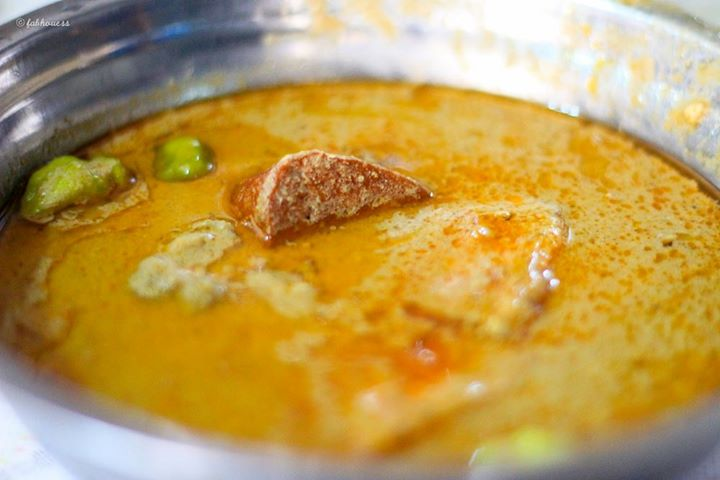
Peanut and wagasi cheese curry

== Process ==
The cow's milk is warmed. It is then stirred with a leaf from a "fromagier" (a plant such as Bombax ceiba) or any other acidic substance. The milk begins to curdle, after which the curds are removed and then pressed into round cheese wheels. These are then dipped into a red wax that is made from another leaf to aid in preservation.

== Preparation ==
Wagasi can be prepared in various ways such as frying or boiling. It is usually served in the form of a substitute for fish or meat in stews. It also can be sold in a fried form when on a journey with pepper for dipping.

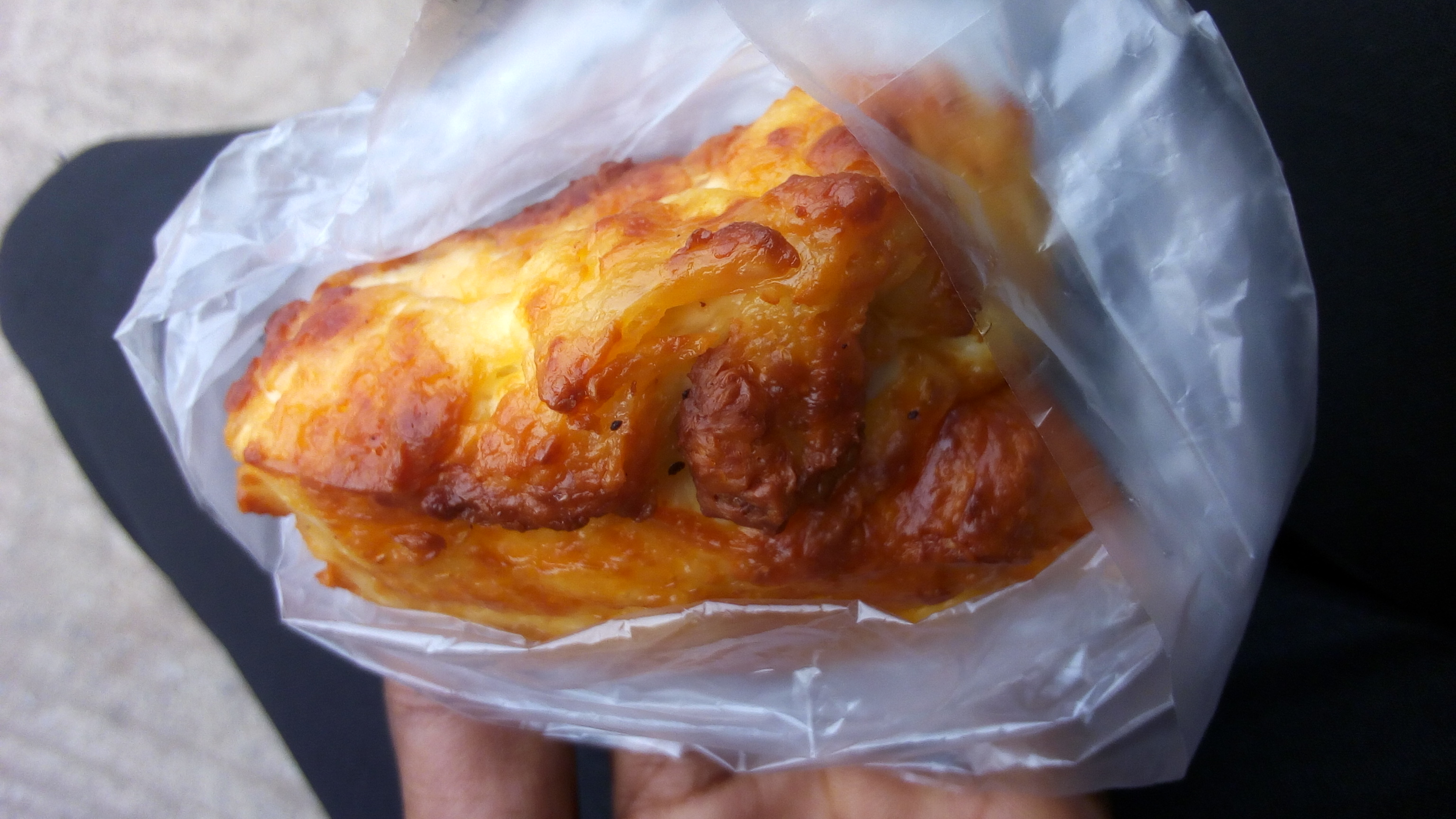
Waagashi

== See also ==
- List of cheeses
