= Chérif Dine Akakpo =

Beninese footballer

Personal information
- Date of birth: 1 December 1997 (age 28)
- Place of birth: Parakou, Benin
- Height: 1.85 m (6 ft 1 in)
- Position: Goalkeeper

Team information
- Current team: Les Buffles

Senior career*
Years	Team	Apps	(Gls)
2018–	Les Buffles		

International career^{‡}
2020–	Benin	2	(0)
- * Club domestic league appearances and goals as of 11 October 2021 ‡ National team caps and goals as of 11 October 2021

Chérif Dine Akakpo (born 1 December 1997) is a Beninese professional footballer who plays as a goalkeeper for Beninese club Les Buffles and the Benin national team.
