= Kassakou =

- Arrondissement and town
- Location in Benin
- Coordinates: 11°5′N 2°54′E
- Country: Benin
- Department: Alibori Department
- Commune: Kandi

Population (2002)
  - Total: 8,196
- Time zone: UTC+1 (WAT)

Kassakou or Kassako is a town and arrondissement in the Alibori Department of northeastern Benin. It is an administrative division under the jurisdiction of the commune of Kandi. According to the population census conducted by the Institut National de la Statistique Benin on February 15, 2002, the arrondissement had a total population of 8,196.

The economy is based on agriculture, particularly cotton farming. The RNIE 2 road passes through the main town, connecting it to the city of Kandi several kilometres to the north.
