= Tassiné River =

River in Benin

Coordinates: 10.696°N 3.231°E

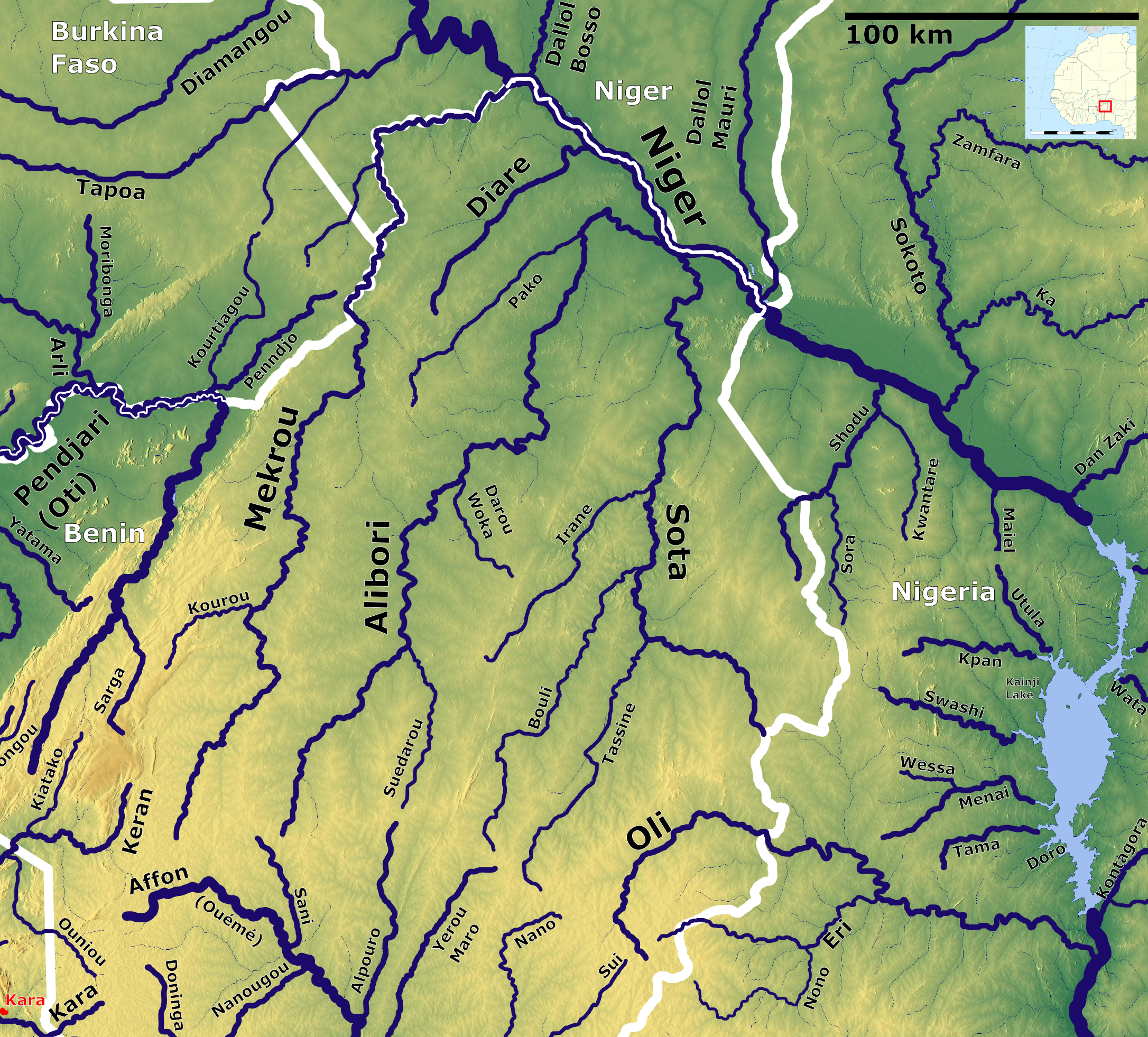
North Benin with the Tassine in the south

The Tassiné River is a river in northeast Benin. It is a tributary of the Sota River.
