= Tasso, Benin =

Coordinates: 9.67372°N 3.23328°E

Tasso
- Arrondissement and town
- Interactive map of Tasso
- Country: Benin
- Department: Borgou Department
- Commune: Nikki

Population (2002)
  - Total: 9,234
- Time zone: UTC+1 (WAT)

Tasso is a town and arrondissement in the Borgou Department of Benin. It is an administrative division under the jurisdiction of the commune of Nikki. According to the population census conducted by the Institut National de la Statistique Benin on February 15, 2002, the arrondissement had a total population of 9,234.
