= Musée en Plein Air de Parakou =

Cultural museum near Parakou, Benin

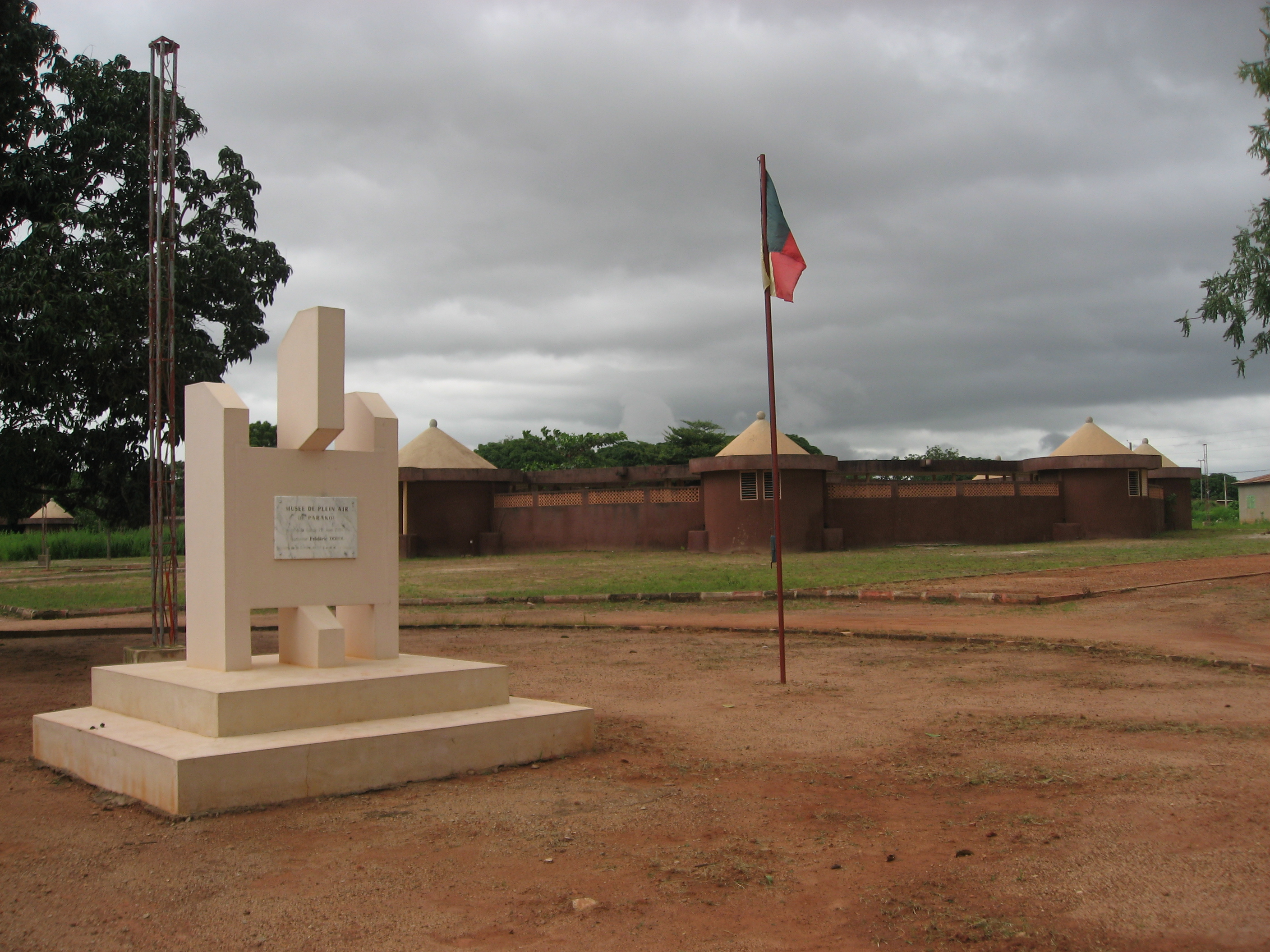
- Location: Parakou, Benin
- Coordinates: 9°19′44″N 2°37′07″E

Musée en Plein Air de Parakou is a museum located approximately 1.5 kilometres (0.93 mi) south of the centre of the city Parakou, Benin in the suburbs. The museum consists of five circular complexes representing the traditional housing of the local Batanou peoples. The museum as of 2006 was in difficulty given that it lacks the funds and maintenance to allow it to fulfill its potential as a showcase. The museum charges a CFA franc 1500 entrance fee.
