= Samou Seidou Adambi =

Beninese politician

Samou Seidou Adambi is a Beninese politician. He is the Minister of Energy, Water and Mines of Benin. He is the former mayor of the commune and city of Parakou.

== See also ==
- Politics of Benin
