= Choukachou =

Beninese millet beer

Choukachou or chouk is a Beninese type of millet beer. It is widely consumed in northern Benin and the city of Parakou is an important centre for brewing. The beer is transported to southern Benin via the railway or road.
