= Faustino Tasso =

Italian monk (1541–1575)

Faustino Tasso, also called Il Somerso (1541–1597) was an Italian Franciscan friar, theologian and poet.

He was born in the Republic of Venice. He wrote two books of poetry titled Rime Toscane published in Turin in 1575.
