= N'Dali =

N’Dali
- Commune and city
- Location in Benin
- Coordinates: 9°51′39″N 2°43′5″E
- Country: Benin
- Department: Borgou Department

Area
  - Total: 1,447 sq mi (3,748 km^{2})

Population (2013)
  - Total: 113,604
- Time zone: UTC+1 (WAT)

N'Dali [nda.li] is a city and arrondissement in the north of Benin, and the capital of the Commune of N'Dali in the Borgou Department. The commune covers an area of 3748 square kilometres and as of 2013 had a population of 113,604 people. In 2008 an estimated 16,941 people living in the main town of N'Dali.

N'Dali, like many areas of Benin, is home to a constituent monarchy.

== Geography ==
It lies on the main north-south highway, approximately 60 km north of Parakou, and is the location of a customs stop where all north/south commercial traffic on the RNIE-2 and RNIE-6 must stop for a customs check. The Sota River begins near N'Dali and flows north-north-east until it reaches the Niger River at Malanville.

It is also the seat of the Roman Catholic Diocese of N’Dali.
