= RNIE 6 =

National highway of Benin

Location
- Country: Benin

Highway system
- Transport in Benin

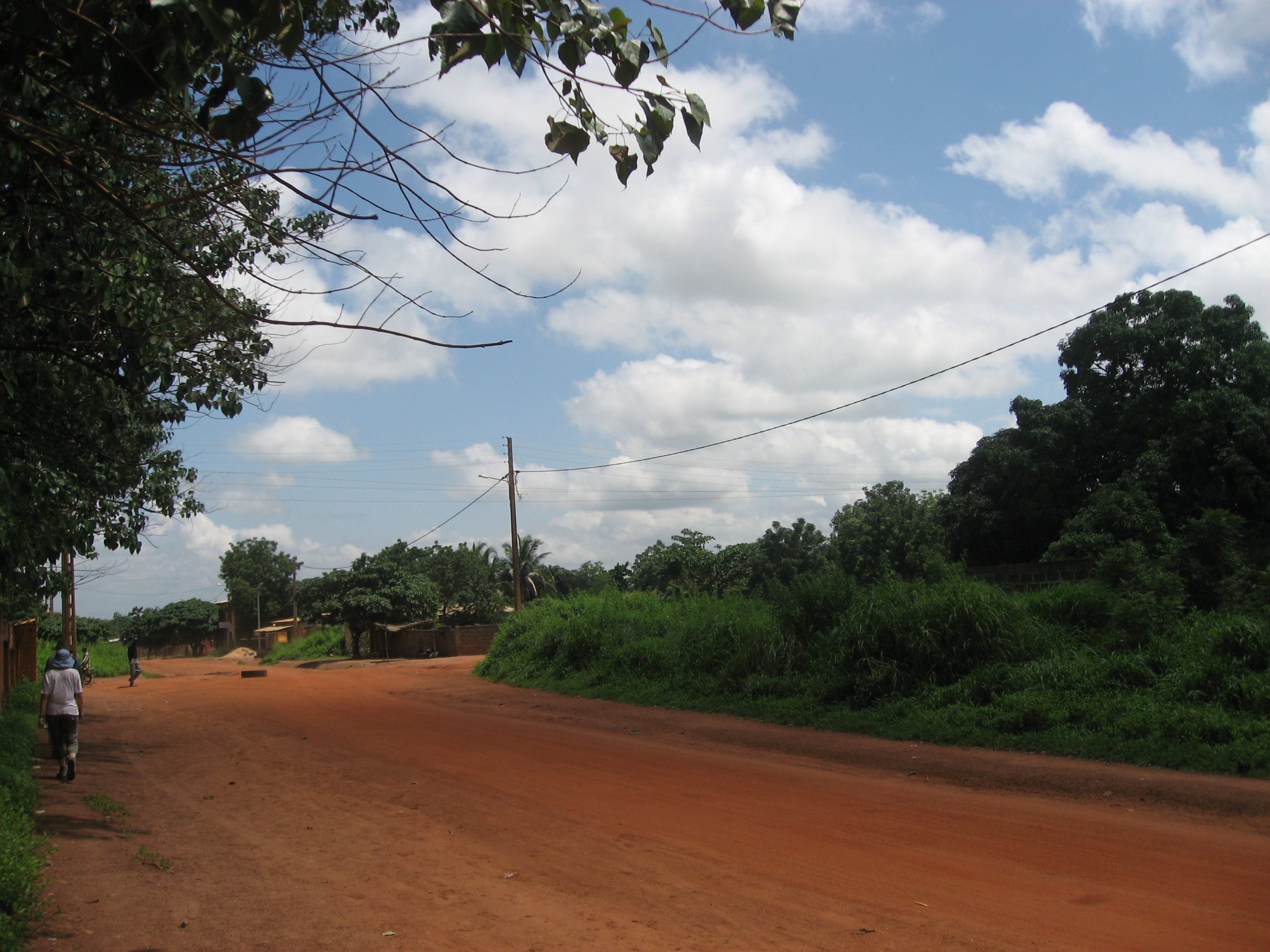
The RNIE 6 road leading out of Parakou

RNIE 6 is a national highway of Benin located in the east of the country.

== Cities and towns ==
- Nikki
- Pèrèrè
- Parakou
