= Parakou =

- City and commune
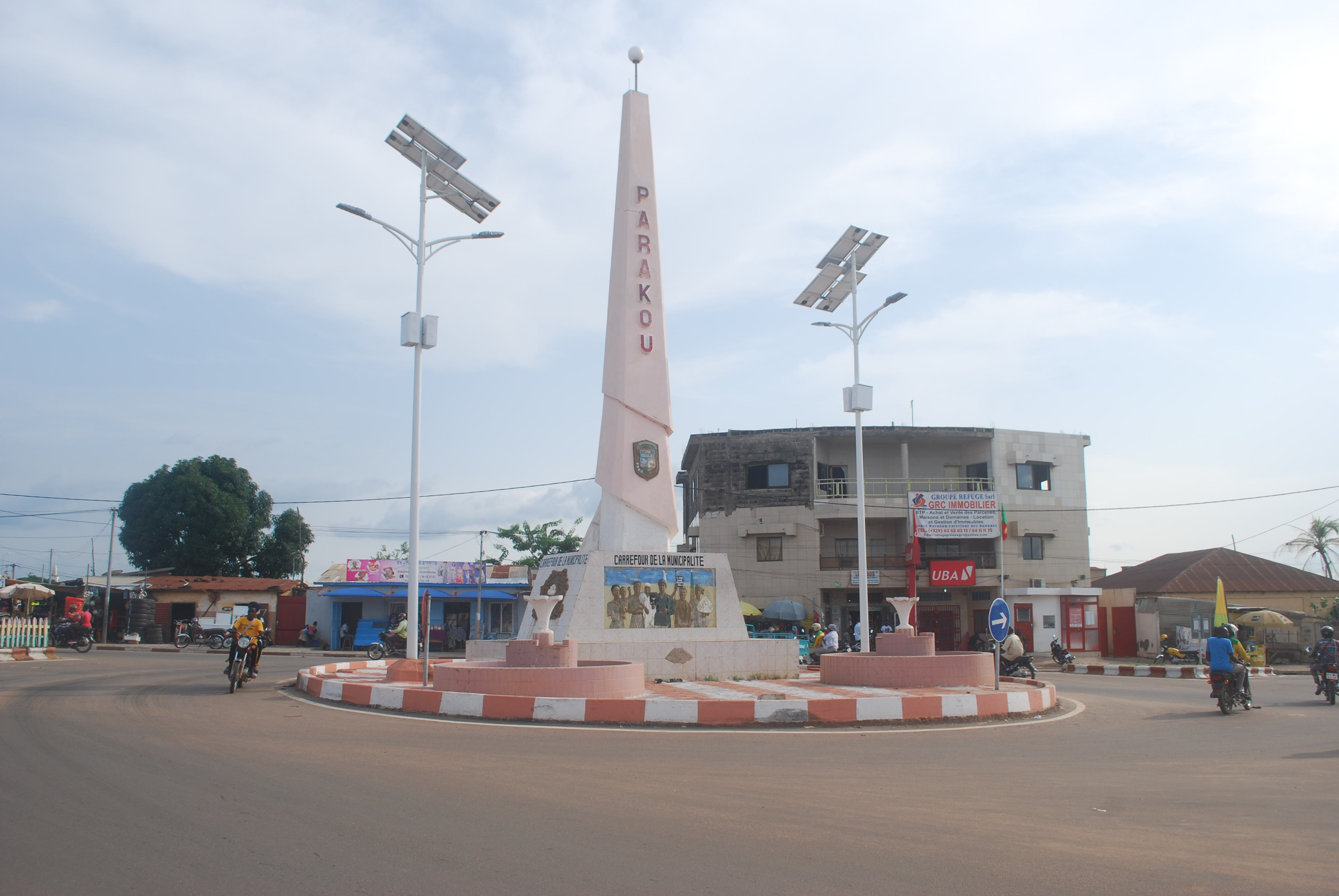
- Central Parakou, 2019

- Location in Benin
- Coordinates: 9°21′N 2°37′E
- Country: Benin
- Department: Borgou Department
- Founded: 1500s

Government
  - Mayor: Inoussa Chabi Zimé

Area
  - Total: 441 km^{2} (170 sq mi)
- Elevation: 324 m (1,063 ft)

Population (2012)
  - Total: 206,667
  - Density: 469/km^{2} (1,210/sq mi)
- Time zone: UTC+1 (WAT)

Parakou [pa.ʁa.ku] is the largest city in northern Benin, and the third-largest city in the country, with an estimated population of 206,667 people, and capital of the Borgou Department. Administratively, the commune of Parakou makes one of Benin's 77 communes.

== History ==
The city was founded in the 16th century by traders. In the 18th century Parakou, like much of the surrounding region, came under the rule of princes from Nikki. The defeat of the Nikki-led invasion of Ilorin in 1837 and death of its king gave Parakou and the other vassals an opportunity to seize more control over trade and increase their political independence. The Anglo-French Convention of 1898 divided the Borgu federation in two. Parakou became the main administrative center of the half that was joined to French Dahomey.

== Economy ==
Parakou lies on the main north-south highway RNIE 2 and at the end of a railway to Cotonou.

=== Markets ===
This has made it an important market town, with major industries including cotton and textiles, peanut oil manufacture and brewing. The town grew initially from revenue generated from passing merchants that took goods from the region across the Sahara and the Mediterranean to Europe. Parakou later became well known in the slave trade. Later traders concentrated on cotton and Parakou remains the hub of the Beninese cotton trade to this day, with considerable interest from Europe.

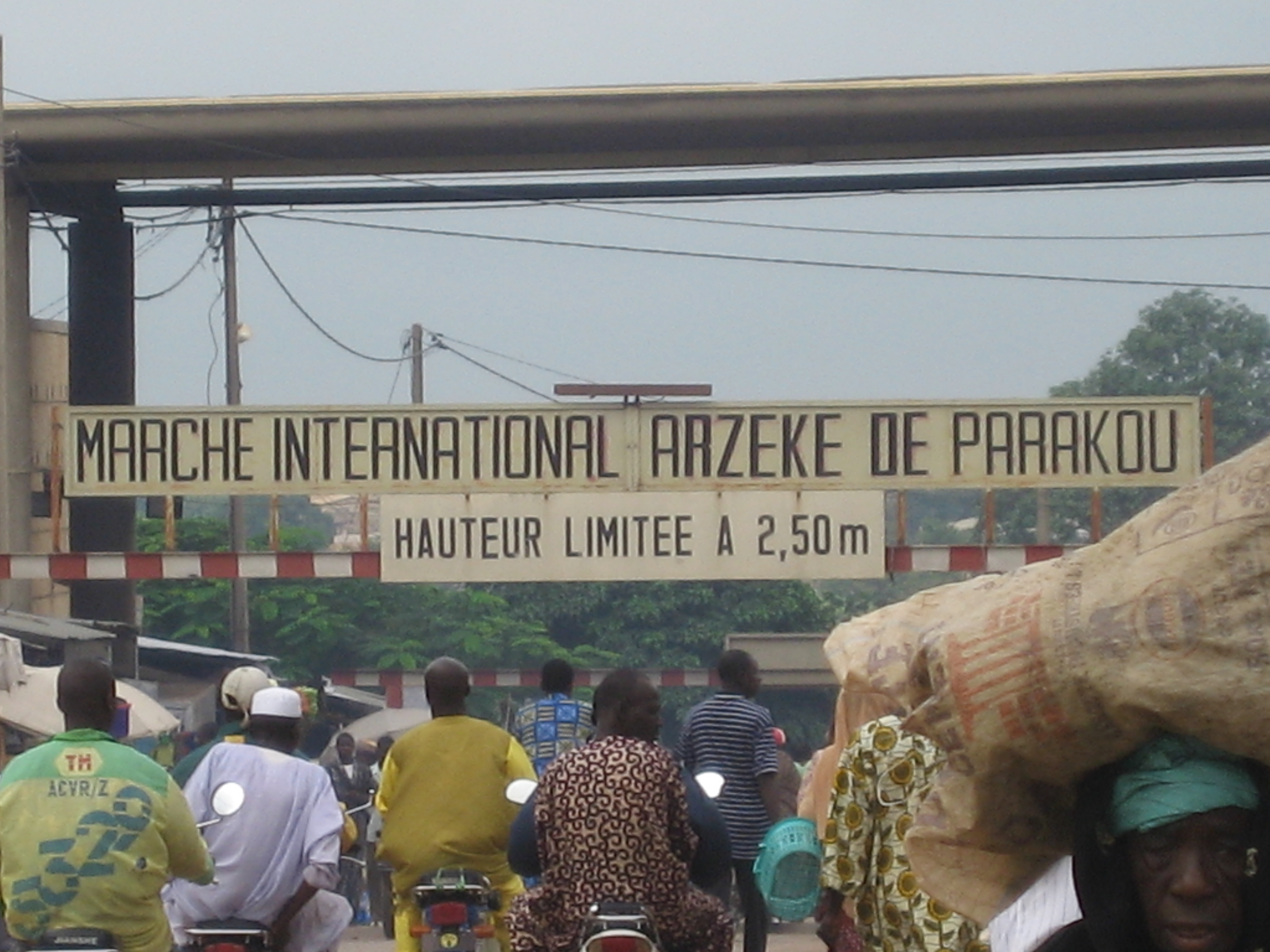
The Grand Marché Arzeke international market

There are several markets trading, notably the largest, Grand Marché Arzeke which one of the largest in Benin, an international market spanning over a block. This market has a large covered hall overlapping onto the streets with stalls, with between 500 and 1000 vendors. The market sells an enormous range of goods from items of pottery including vases and bowls, to cotton textiles, cassettes and CD's of local and international artists, local spices, fruits, gasaru/wagasi (cow's milk cheese) and kitchen utensils. Another market, located several blocks north, is called the "Marché Kobo Kobo", which lies across the street from the French Cultural Centre. Marché Kobo Kobo is known for its clothing retailing, primarily second hand goods, and in another section livestock. The Marché Depot is located near Parakou Railway Station around numerous hotels and sells mostly food but also calabashes and baskets. There is also the Marché Guema, located next to Guema Church on the northern road to Malanville in the Albarika quarter of the city. The market was founded by the Somba people of the Atacora, and takes place every Sunday at 10 am. The market consists of a collection of grass huts, and specialises in beef and pork and local millet beer known as choukachou or simply "chouk".

=== Inland Port ===
Parakou is the site of a proposed inland port.

The dry port is a multi-modal platform located 3 km from the centre of Parakou, close to the railway. It gives the Backbone Project a strategic position for imports and exports to neighbouring countries, notably Burkina Faso, Mali, Niger, Nigeria and Togo.

== Demographics ==
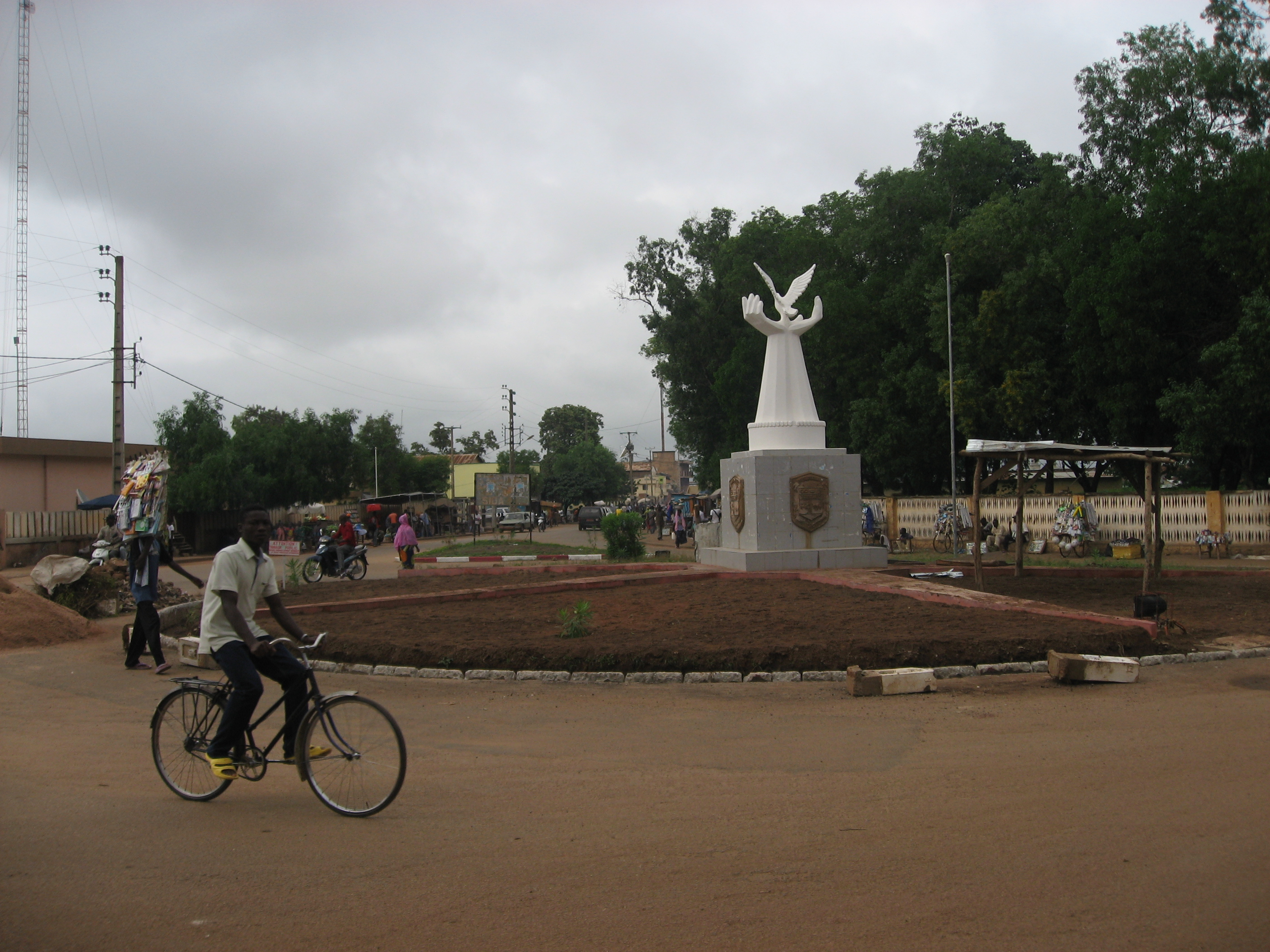
A roundabout in Parakou

The name, Parakou, is derived from a Dendi word meaning "the city of everyone", named for the city's diversity of ethnicities. As a market town attracting many people as a trading and stop-off point, Parakou has a large mix of African ethnicities, including Fula, Dendi, Somba, Fon, Mina, Bariba, Djerma, Yoruba (of the Nago tribe), Hausa, Kabrais, Warma, and Tuareg.

In 1979 the city was reported as having 60,915 people and according to the official census of 1992, Parakou had a population of 103,577. In the last 15–20 years the population of Parakou has nearly doubled with 149,819 recorded in 2002 and with the most recent census in 2013, the population was 255,478.

== Climate ==
Parakou has a tropical savanna climate (Aw) according to the Köppen climate classification.

Climate data for Parakou (1991–2020)
Month	Jan	Feb	Mar	Apr	May	Jun	Jul	Aug	Sep	Oct	Nov	Dec	Year
Mean daily maximum °C (°F)	35.0 (95.0)	36.9 (98.4)	37.4 (99.3)	35.6 (96.1)	33.3 (91.9)	31.2 (88.2)	29.7 (85.5)	28.8 (83.8)	30.0 (86.0)	31.8 (89.2)	34.6 (94.3)	34.8 (94.6)	33.3 (91.9)
Daily mean °C (°F)	27.5 (81.5)	29.6 (85.3)	30.7 (87.3)	29.7 (85.5)	28.2 (82.8)	26.7 (80.1)	25.7 (78.3)	25.2 (77.4)	25.7 (78.3)	26.8 (80.2)	28.0 (82.4)	27.4 (81.3)	27.6 (81.7)
Mean daily minimum °C (°F)	19.9 (67.8)	22.3 (72.1)	24.0 (75.2)	23.8 (74.8)	23.0 (73.4)	22.1 (71.8)	21.8 (71.2)	21.5 (70.7)	21.4 (70.5)	21.7 (71.1)	21.4 (70.5)	20.0 (68.0)	21.9 (71.4)
Average precipitation mm (inches)	4.9 (0.19)	8.0 (0.31)	33.6 (1.32)	83.2 (3.28)	133.8 (5.27)	157.5 (6.20)	188.8 (7.43)	212 (8.3)	221.5 (8.72)	111.9 (4.41)	6.9 (0.27)	1.9 (0.07)	1,164 (45.83)
Average precipitation days (≥ 1.0 mm)	1	1	3	7	11	13	16	18	19	11	1	0	101
Average relative humidity (%)	33.2	38.7	51.9	64.3	72.0	76.4	79.5	81.8	80.0	75.3	57.2	39.9	62.5
Mean monthly sunshine hours	251.5	233.2	234.8	230.9	229.1	190.0	144.8	119.6	148.7	208.7	250.2	259.9	2,501.4
Source: NOAA

== Culture ==
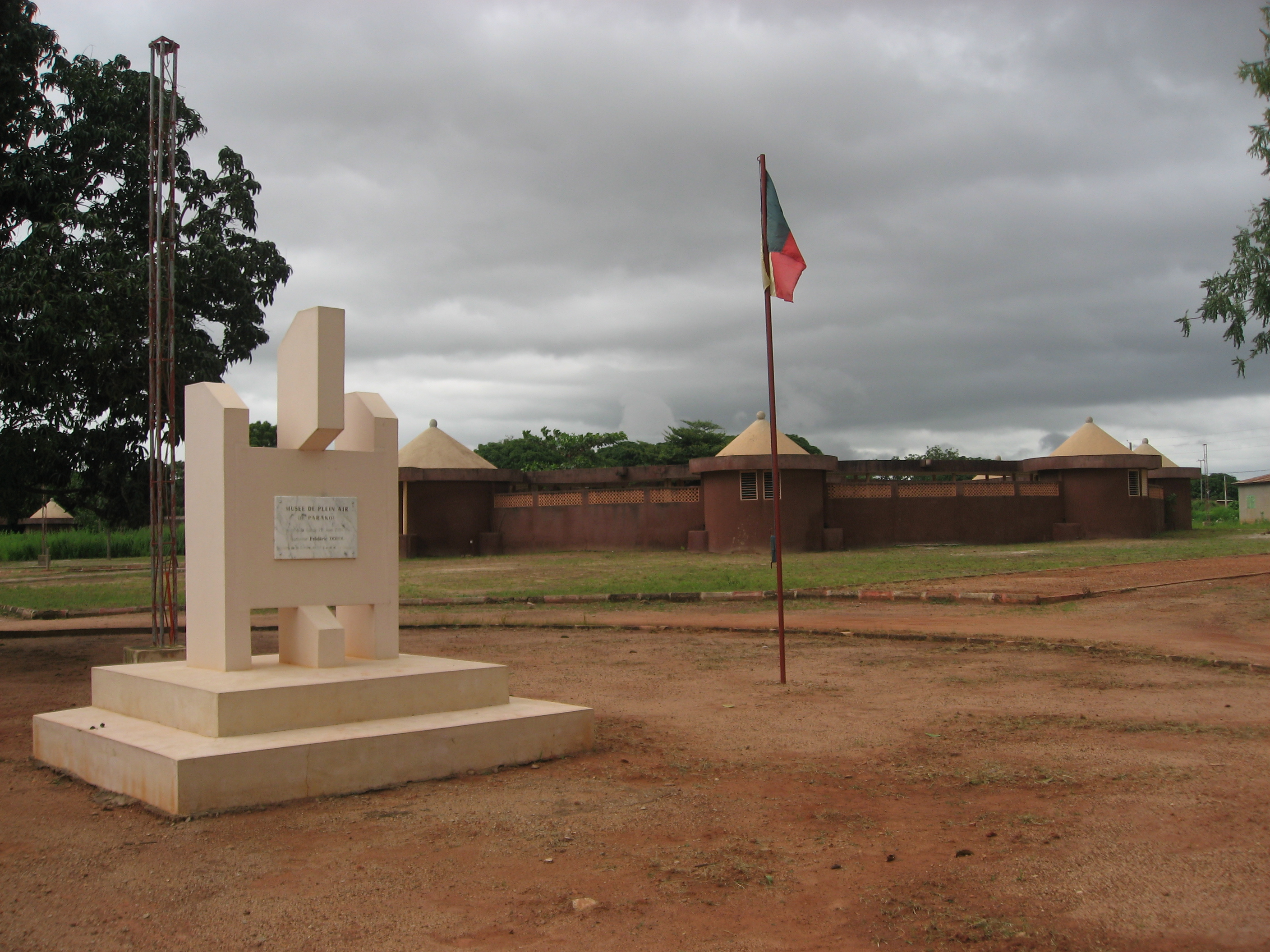
The Musée en Plein Air de Parakou

The city has a museum, the Musée en Plein Air de Parakou.

Wagasi is a type of cow's-milk cheese which is mainly made in Parakou.

== Administration ==
Parakou is one of the 77 official communes of Benin. The mayor of the commune and city as of 2008 is Samou Seidou Adambi.

=== Villages ===
The commune of Parakou contains the following villages:

Amawihon, Bakaga, Bakounkparou, Bakounourou, Baperou, Bereyadou, Borarou, Darou Kourarou, Debregourou, Dokparou, Douerou, Forane Kparou, Gagbebou, Ganou, Ga Yakabou, Gommboko, Gorobani, Gouforou, Goutere, Guema, Guererou, Guinrerou, Kaborokpo, Kabro, Karobouarou, Kipare, Konkoma, Koumerou, Kperou Guera, Moundouro, Nekinparo, Nikikperou, Ouroungourou, Pepekino, Pepepeterou, Sanro, Senouorou, Sokoumeno, Sokouno, Sonoumo, Sourou, Suinrou, Tabayorourou, Tankaro, Tankaro Ga, Teougourou Gando, Tian, Tinekonparou, Tora, Tourou, Wansirou, Weria, Wore, Worora, Yakassirou

== Education ==
Parakou is home to one university, the University of Parakou, founded in 2001.

== Places of worship ==
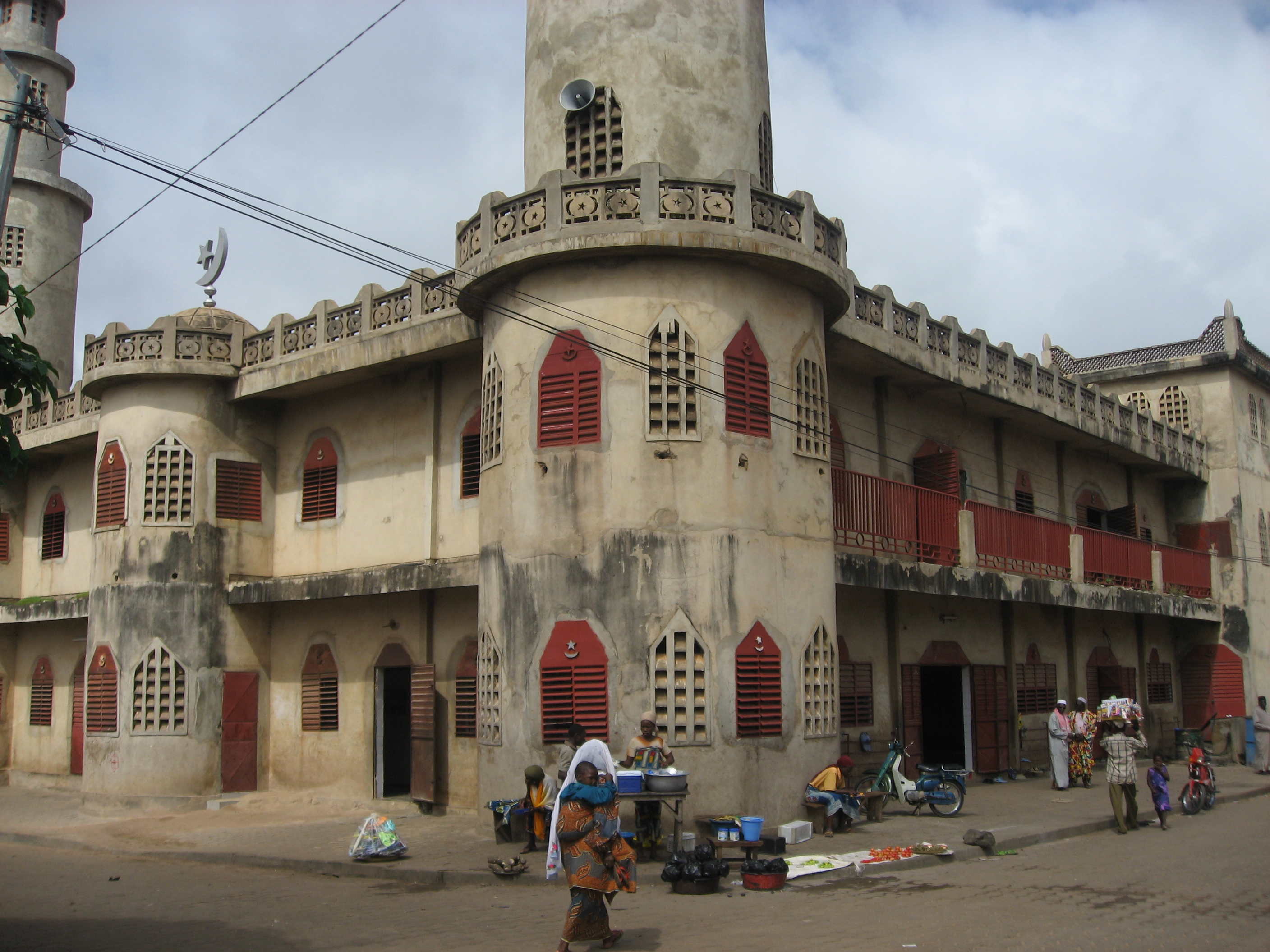
Parakou Mosque

Among the places of worship, most predominant are Muslim mosques. There are also several Christian denominations represented: Roman Catholic Archdiocese of Parakou (Catholic Church), Protestant Methodist Church in Benin (World Methodist Council), Union of Baptist Churches of Benin (Baptist World Alliance), Living Faith Church Worldwide, Redeemed Christian Church of God and the Assemblies of God.

== Transport ==
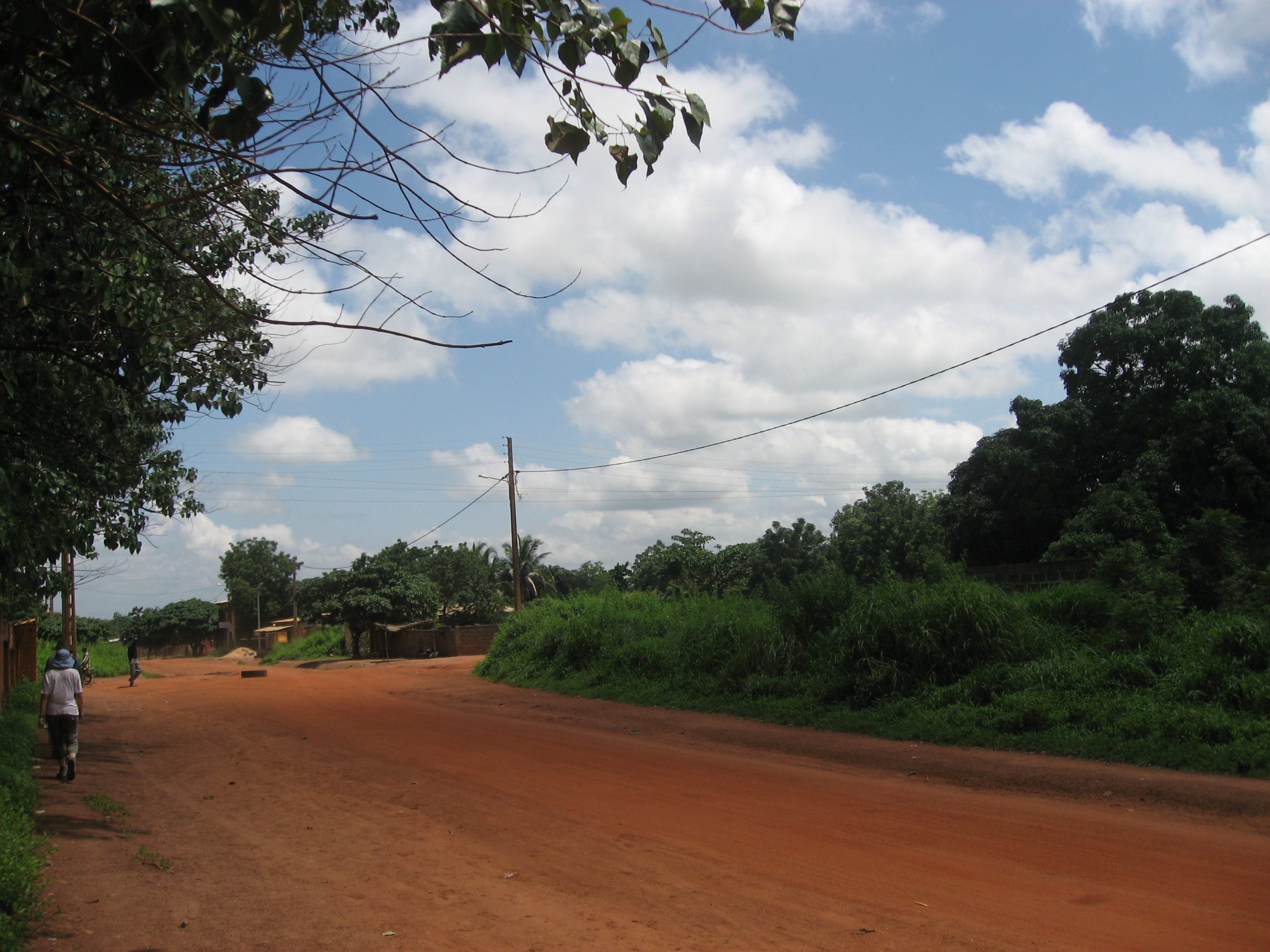
The RNIE 6 road leading out of Parakou

Parakou Railway Station is the last railway station on the Parakou-Cotonou railway, however at present it is not open to passenger transportation. Both the national highways RNIE 2 and RNIE 6 pass through Parakou. The city is also served by Parakou Airport. The government has proposed extending the railway to Dosso in Niger.

== Sport ==
The main football clubs are Dynamo Unacob FC de Parakou and Buffles du Borgou FC which play in the Benin Premier League, the highest division of Beninese football.

== Notable people ==
- Hubert Maga, first President of Benin (1916–2000)
- Chabi Mama, politician (1921–1996)
- Marc Aillet, French bishop
- Chérif Dine Akakpo, Beninese professional footballer (born 1997)
- Mohamed Chikoto, footballer
- Nouhoum Kobéna, former footballer
- Arouna Mama, politician (1925–1974)
- Steve Mounié, footballer
- Achille Rouga, former footballer
- Abdel Fadel Suanon, footballer

== See also ==
- Railway stations in Benin
- West Africa Regional Rail Integration

== Bibliography ==
- *Akinwumi, Olayemi (1999). "Oral Traditions and the Political History of Borgu". Anthropos. 4 (1).
- Matthews, Ronald (1966). African Powder Keg: Revolt and Dissent in Six Emergent Nations. London: The Bodley Head. OCLC 246401461..
- Butler, Stuart (2006). Benin. Guilford, Connecticut: Bradt Travel Guides, The Globe Pequot Press.
