= RNIE 2 =

National highway of Benin

Location
- Country: Benin

Highway system
- Transport in Benin

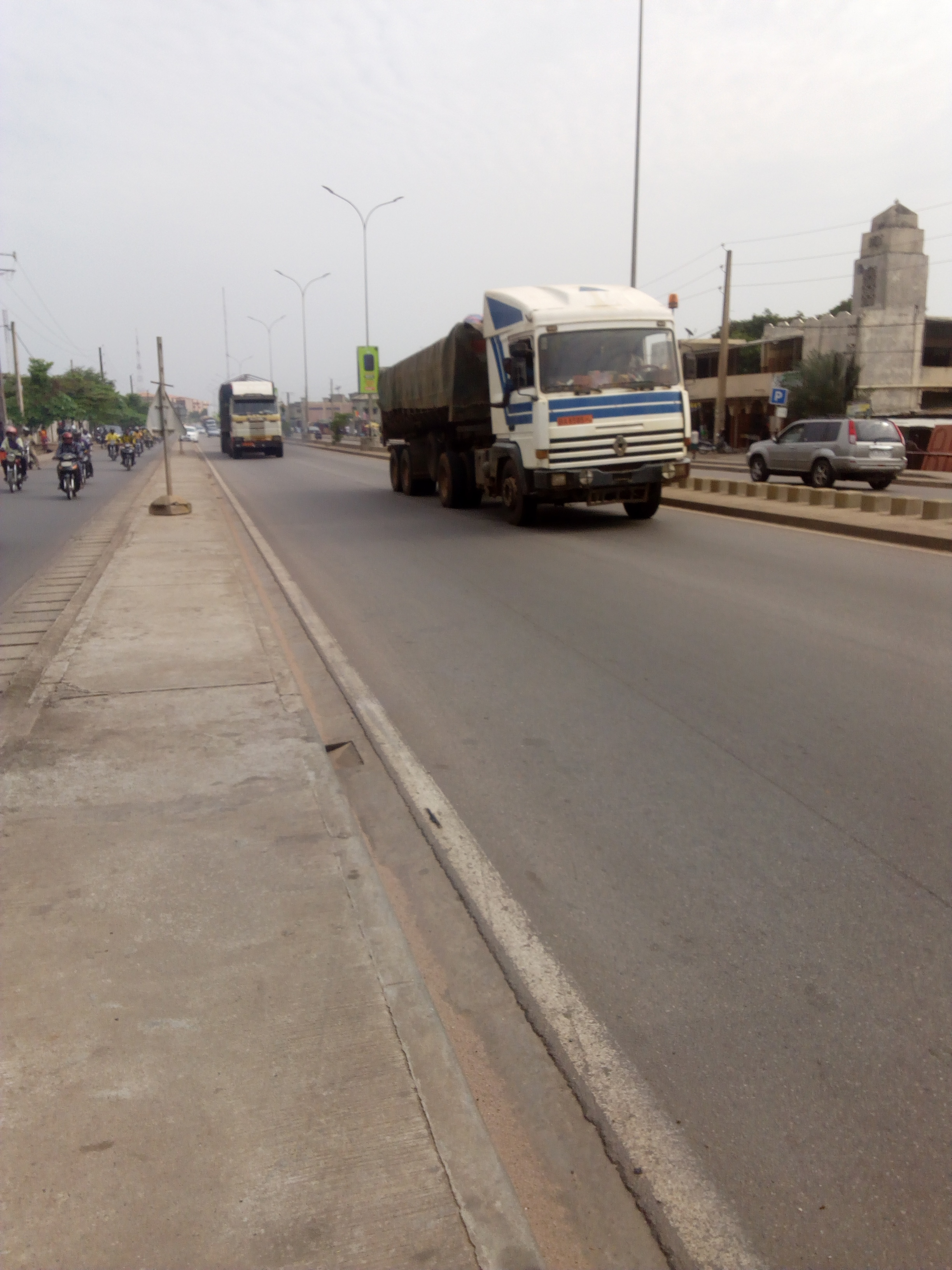

RNIE 2 is a national highway of Benin. It is Benin's main north–south highway which runs the entire 785 km down the centre of the country from the Niger River to Cotonou. The RNIE 2 crosses the RNIE 4 at Bohicon east of Abomey.

== Cities and towns ==
- Parakou
- Cotonou
- Bohicon
- Kassakou
