= Nikki, Benin =

Nikki
- Commune and town
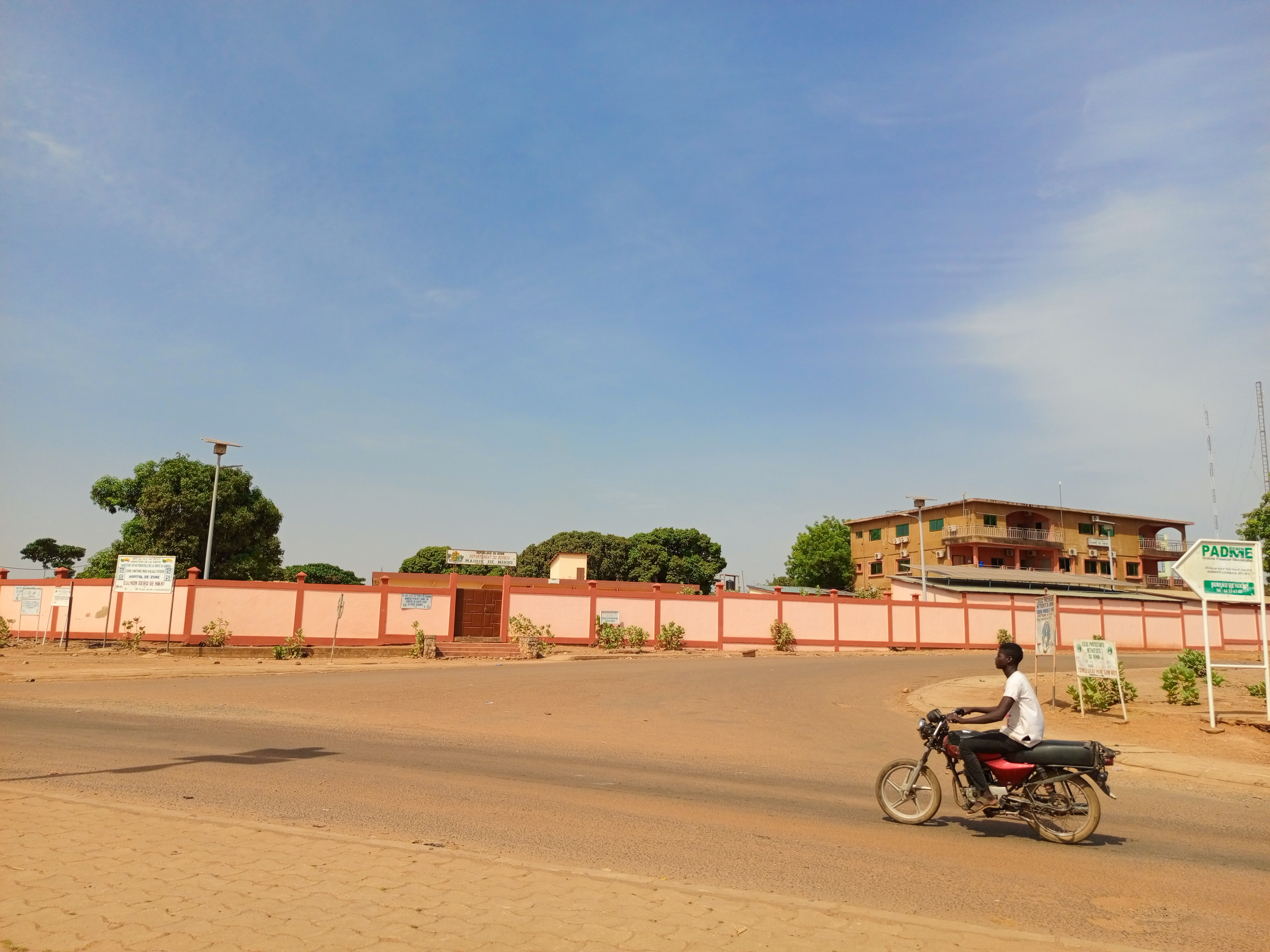
- Nikki Town Hall

- Location in Benin
- Coordinates: 9°56′0″N 3°12′30″E
- Country: Benin
- Department: Borgou Department

Government
  - Sina Boko: Séro Kora

Area
  - Total: 3,171 km^{2} (1,224 sq mi)
- Elevation: 423 m (1,388 ft)

Population (2012)
  - Total: 69,970
  - Density: 22.07/km^{2} (57.15/sq mi)
- Time zone: UTC+1 (WAT)

Nikki [ni.ki] is a town, arrondissement, and commune located in the Borgou Department of Benin. The commune covers an area of 3171 square kilometres and as of 2002 had a population of 99,251 people.

Nikki is a major centre of the Baatonu people, and is home to a traditional king, resident in the centre of the town. The Gaani royal festival is held in the town annually. Before the colonial era, Nikki was one of the main political centers of the Borgu federation.

== History ==
=== Foundation ===
The capital of the kingdom of Nikki was originally Ouénou. Among the ethnic groups and peoples living in Ouénou, the Baatombu were a hierarchical people with a king at the top with the title Ouénou-Sounon. Around 1480, the Wassangari arrived in the region under the leadership of their leader Mansa Doro. Séro, his groom, son of Kisra was then chosen as head of the community which remained in the region and which was organized on the model of Ouénou-Sounon. He married local Baatombu women, and had a son named Simé. During a hunting trip, Simé identified the site of Nikki. The name derives from the humidity of the site; he said: “Ya niké – nikérou san” (in Bariba: “it's humid”). Simé established his residence there but his father Séro remained in Ouénou.

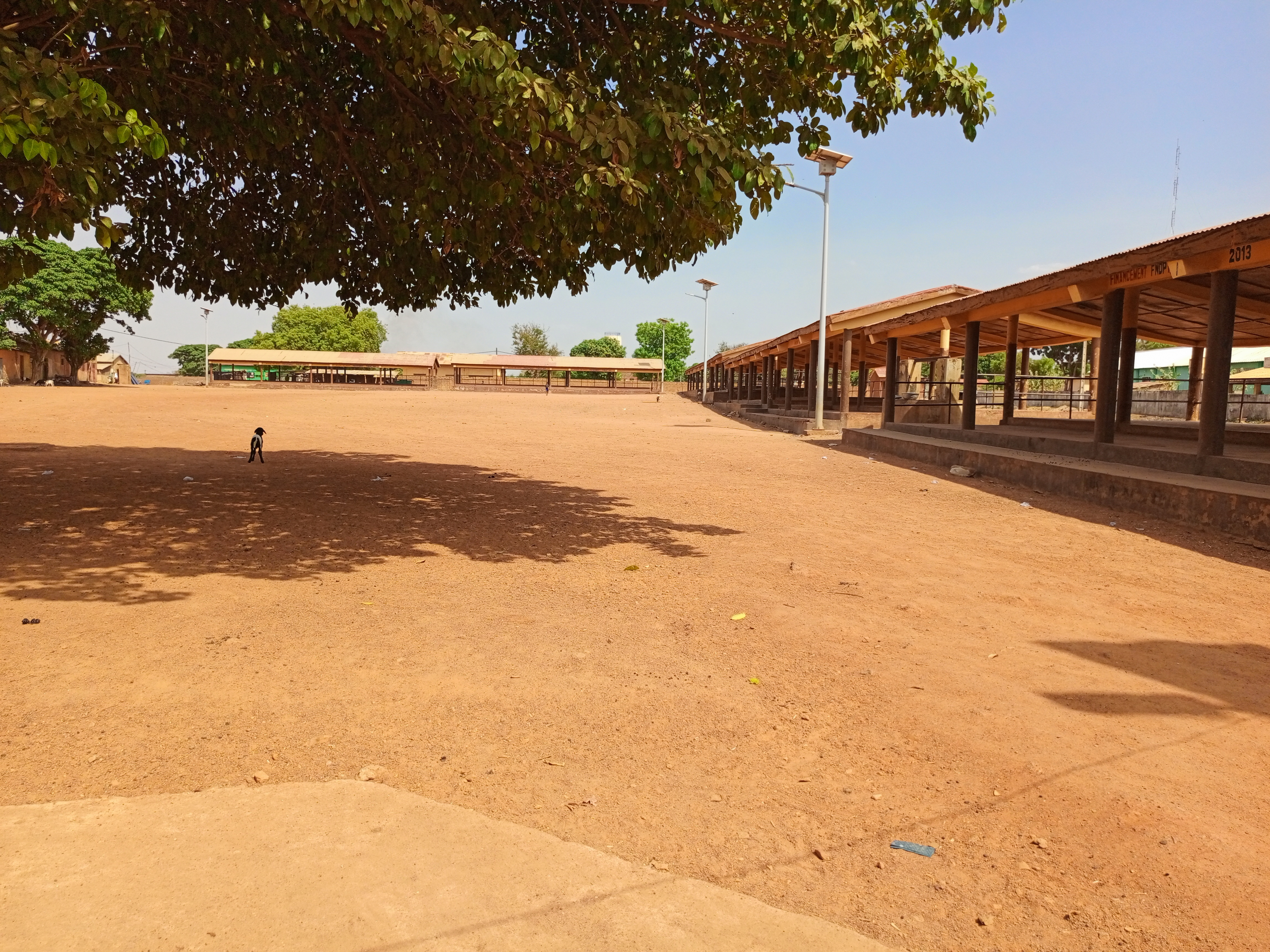
The Royal Court at Nikki, site of the Gaani festival

=== Regional Power ===
Nikki became one of the most powerful and important cities in the Borgu confederacy, less prestigious but generally more powerful than the older Bussa. The city's strategic position astride trade routes linking Bondoukou, Gonja and the Ashanti Empire with Hausaland and the Oyo Empire brought it wealth and power. Throughout the 18th century, princes from Nikki fanned out, founding new petty kingdoms under the mother city's patronage all across southern Borgu, including Kandi, Kaiama, Parakou, Natitingou and others. Nikki played a key role in the regional economy, protecting trade routes, signing trade treaties with neighboring powers, and minting the mithqal gold coin that became a common currency in the region.

In the 1820s, Fulani jihadists from the Sokoto Caliphate had taken control of Ilorin in the crumbling Oyo Empire. Alaafin Oluewu looked to Borgu, which was also suffering raids, to join him in an 1837 effort to push back the Muslims. Siru Kpera, the Sina Boko of Nikki, led a force bringing together cities from all across Borgu. After several initial successes, the alliance suffered a calamitous defeat and Siru Kpera was killed. With his death, the peripheral princelings under Nikki's influence became increasingly independent and began taxing and raiding trade caravans, undermining the mother city's regional influence.

=== Colonial Era ===
When Great Britain and France penetrated the region in the late 19th century, they saw Borgu as an important strategic area. The 1894 'Race for Nikki' saw Frederick Lugard and Capt. Decoeur racing to sign commercial and protectorate treaties with Sina Boko Laffia. Lugard succeeded first, on November 10, followed by Decoeur on the 26th. The exact border between French and British spheres of influence was settled in 1898, dividing Borgu in two. Nikki was joined to French Dahomey, but its former vassal Parakou was made the center of administration, and the town's importance declined.

== Notable people ==
Benin minister Aurélie Adam Soule was born here in 1984.

== Climatic Condition ==
The year-round climate of Nikki is humid, stifling, and hot, with sporadic lows and highs
