= Borgou Department =

Department of Benin

Borgou
- Department
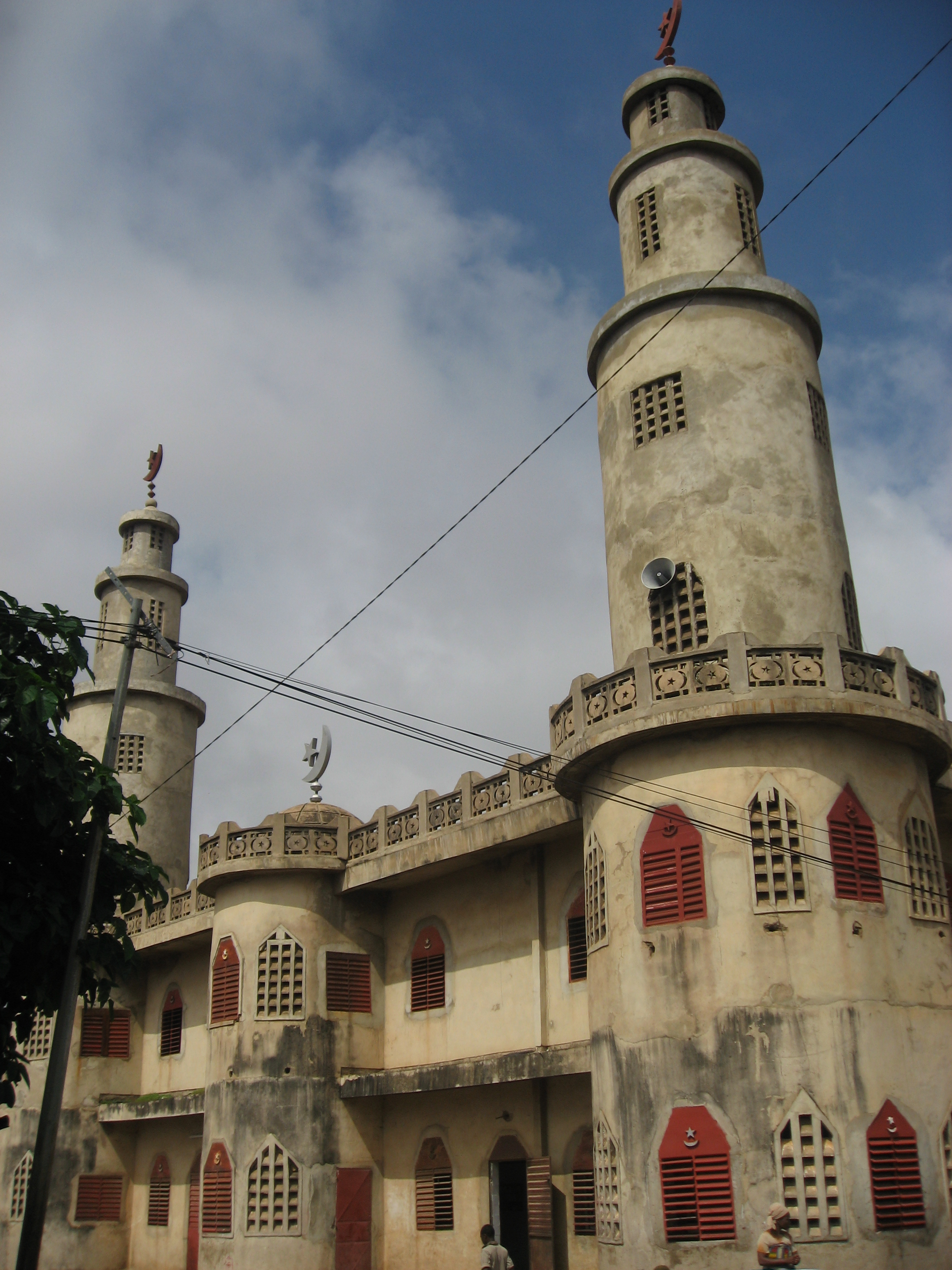
- Mosque in Parakou, Benin

- Map highlighting the Borgou Department
- Coordinates: 9°21′N 2°37′E
- Country: Benin
- Capital: Parakou

Area
  - Total: 25,856 km^{2} (9,983 sq mi)

Population (2013 census)
  - Total: 1,202,095
  - Density: 46.492/km^{2} (120.41/sq mi)
- Time zone: UTC+1 (WAT)

Borgou [bɔʁ.ɡu] is one of the twelve departments of Benin. Borgou borders the country of Nigeria and the departments of Alibori, Atakora, Collines and Donga. The capital of Borgou is Parakou. The department of Borgou was bifurcated in 1999, with its northern territory transferred to the newly created Alibori Department.

According to the 2013 census, the total population of the department was 1,214,249, with 607,013 males and 607,236 females. The proportion of women was 50.00%. The total rural population was 56.40%, while the urban population was 43.60%. The total labour force in the department was 271,652, of which 25.20% were women. The proportion of households with no level of education was 64.30%.

== Geography ==
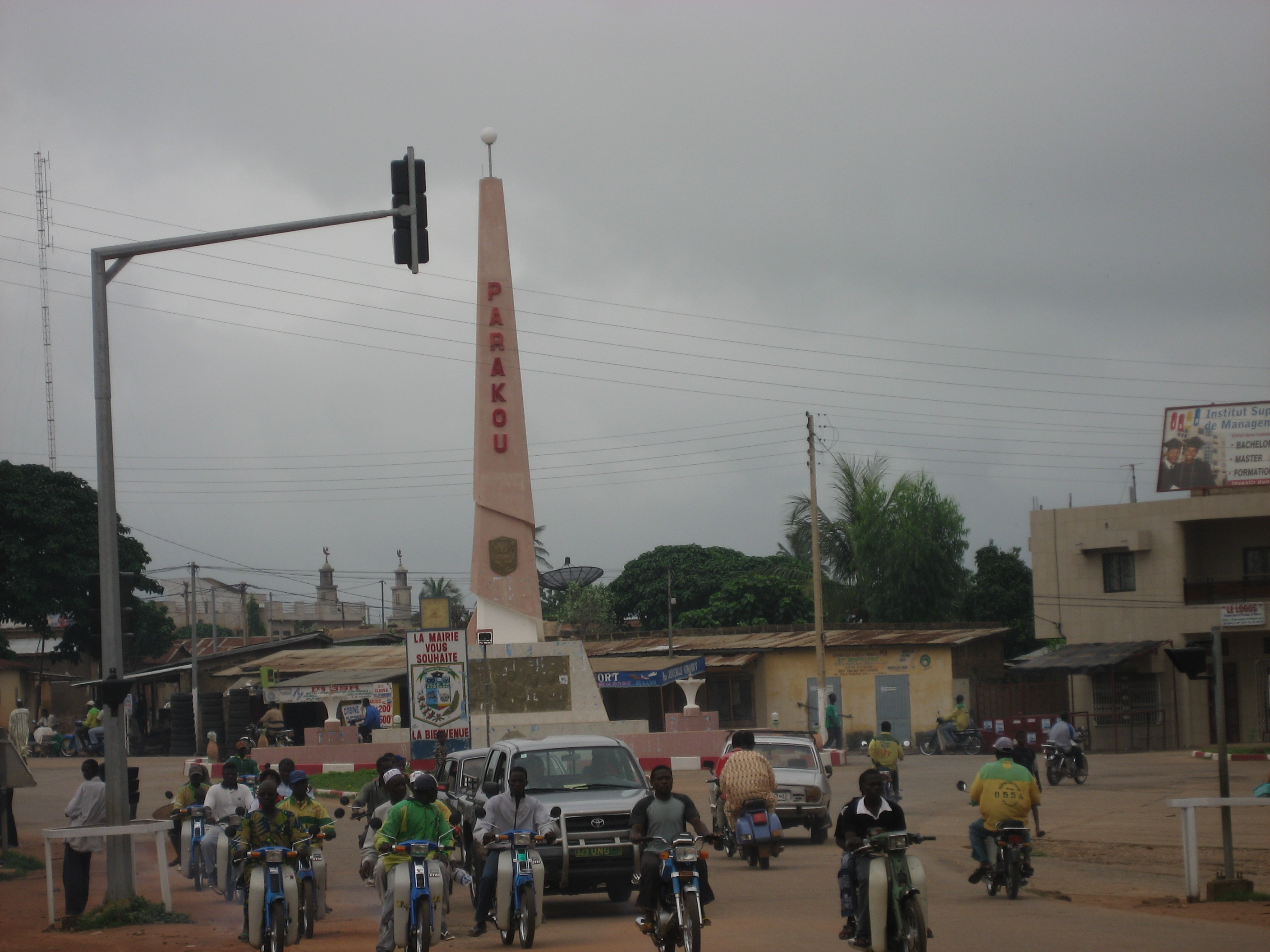
Parakou, the departmental capital

Borgou borders Alibori Department to the north, Nigeria to the east, Collines Department to the south, and Donga Department and Atakora Department to the west. Geographically, the department is part of the larger Borg(o)u region divided by the Benin–Nigeria border, with 130,000 square kilometres (50,000 sq mi) in Benin and 52,000 square kilometres (20,000 sq mi) in Nigeria. The northern regions of Benin, in general, receive one season of rainfall from May to September, compared to the southern regions which receive two spells of rain from March to July and September to November. The average temperature from April to June reaches 40 °C (104 °F), while the average temperature between November and March ranges between 12 and 25 °C (54 and 77 °F). The average elevation of the department is 200 m (660 ft) above the mean sea level.

=== Settlements ===
Parakou is the departmental capital; other major settlements include Bembèrèkè, Bori, Kalalè, N’Dali, Nikki, Sinendé and Tchaourou.

== Demographics ==
Religious census
Religion	Percent(%)
Muslim	75.3%
Catholic	15%
Other Christian	2.8%
Other Protestant	1.7%
Methodist	1.2%
Vodoun	1%
Celestial Church	0.7%
Other Traditional	1.3%
Other	0.8%

According to Benin's 2013 census, the total population of the department was 1,214,249, with 607,013 males and 607,236 females. The proportion of women was 50.00%. The total rural population was 56.40%, while the urban population was 43.60%. The proportion of women of childbearing age (15 to 49 years old) was 22.30%. The foreign population was 22,665, representing 1.90% of the total population in the department. The labour force participation rate among foreigners aged 15–64 years was 30.20%. The proportion of women among the foreign population constituted 47.00%. The number of households in the department was 158,099 and the average household size was 7.7. The intercensal growth rate of the population was 4.70%.

Among women, the average age at first marriage was 27.1. The synthetic index of fertility of women was 5.4. The average number of families in a house was 1.7 and the average number of persons per room was 1.8. The total labour force in the department was 271,652, of which 25.20% were women. The proportion of households with no level of education was 64.30% and the proportion of households with children attending school was 47.10%. The crude birth rate was 39.5, the general rate of fertility was 176.90 and the gross reproduction rate was 2.70.

The main ethnolinguistic groups in the department are the Fulani, Bariba, Yoruba and Dendi. Other groups include the Boko, Ede, Lukpa, Tammari (also known as the Betammaribe, or Somba) and Yom.

== Administrative divisions ==
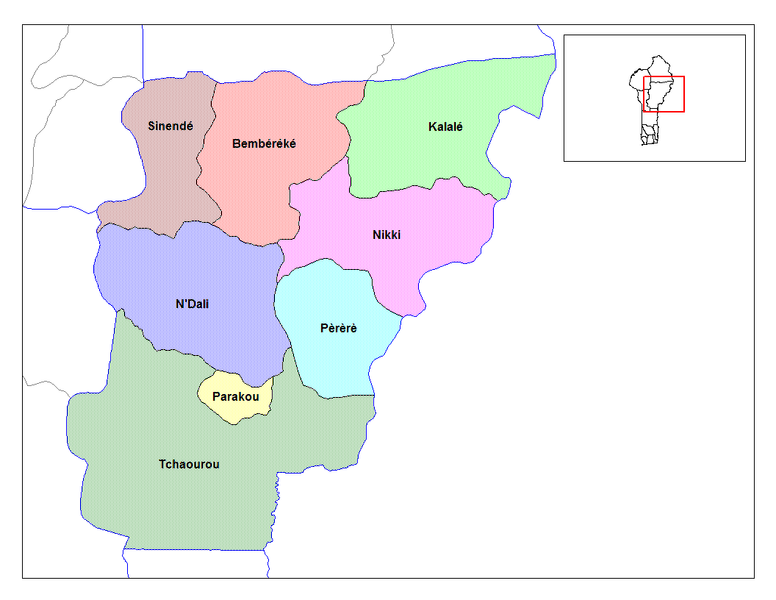
Communes of Borgou

Borgou is subdivided into eight communes, each centered at one of the principal towns: Bembèrèkè, Kalalé, N’Dali, Nikki, Parakou, Pèrèrè, Sinendé and Tchaourou. The department of Borgou was bifurcated in 1999, with its northern territory transferred to the newly created Alibori Department.

Benin originally had six administrative regions (départements), which have now been bifurcated to make 12. Each of the deconcentrated administrative services (directions départementales) of the sectoral ministries takes care of two administrative regions. A law passed in 1999 transformed the sous-prefectures, the lowest level of territorial administration, into local governments. Municipalities and communal councils have elected representatives who manage the administration of the regions. The latest elections of the municipal and communal councils were held in June 2015.
