= List of tributaries of the Niger =

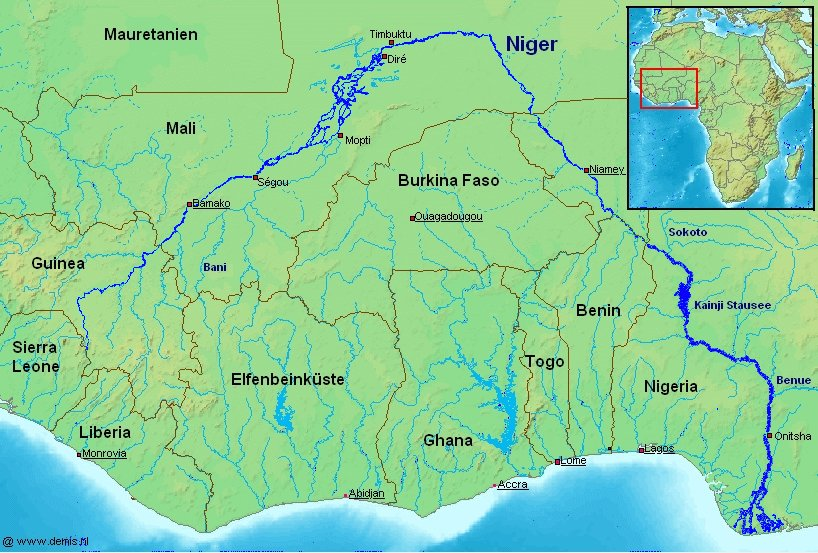

This is a list of the Tributaries of the Niger River. They are listed by nation, at the point they converge into the Niger.

== Benin ==
- Alibori River

== Burkina Faso ==
- Sirba River

== Guinea ==
- Tinkisso River
- Milo River
- Niandan River

== Mali ==
- Sankarani River
- Bani River

== Niger ==
- Mekrou River

== Nigeria ==
- Sokoto River
- Kaduna River
- Benue River
- Forcados River
- Nun River
