= List of rivers of Niger =

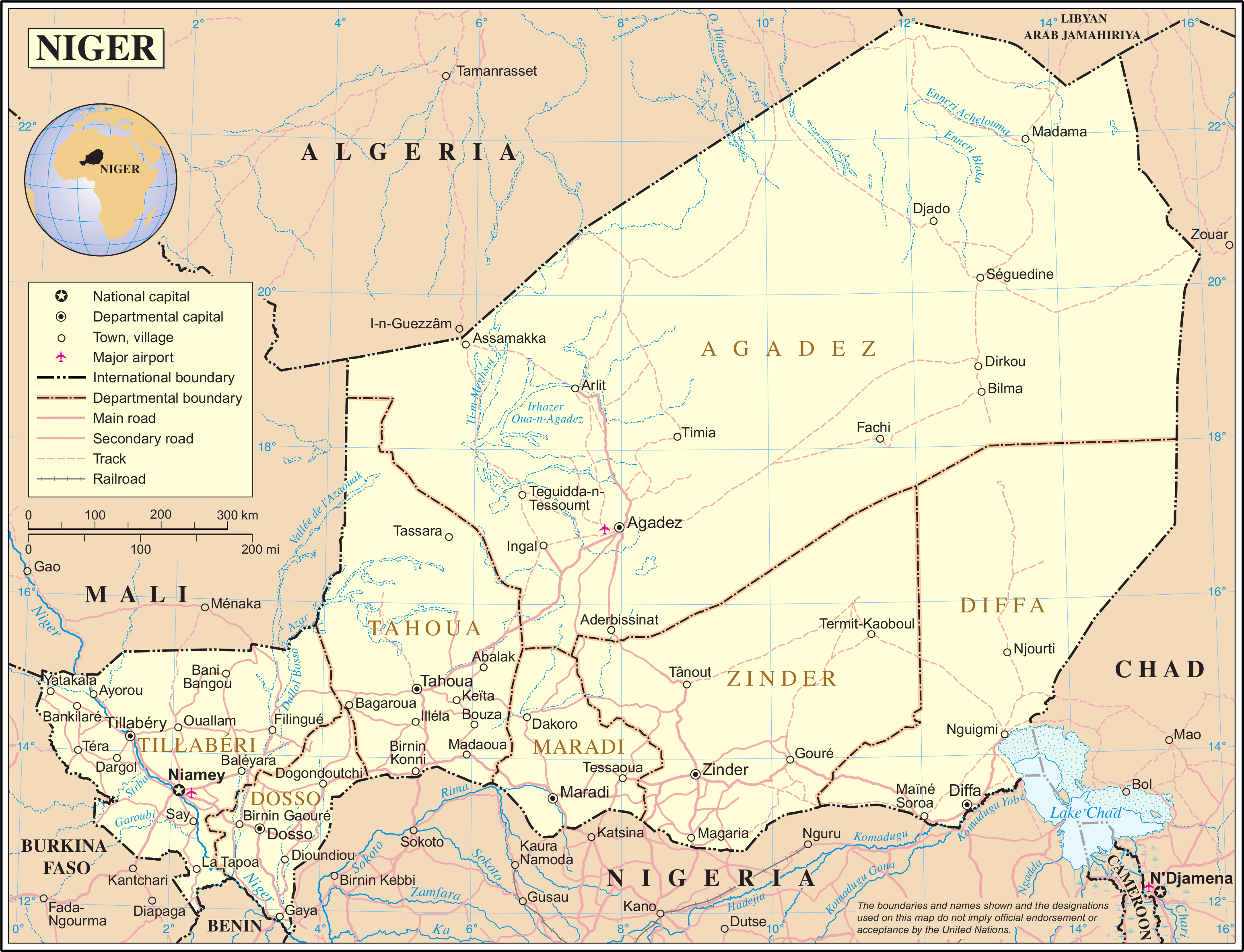
Map of Niger.

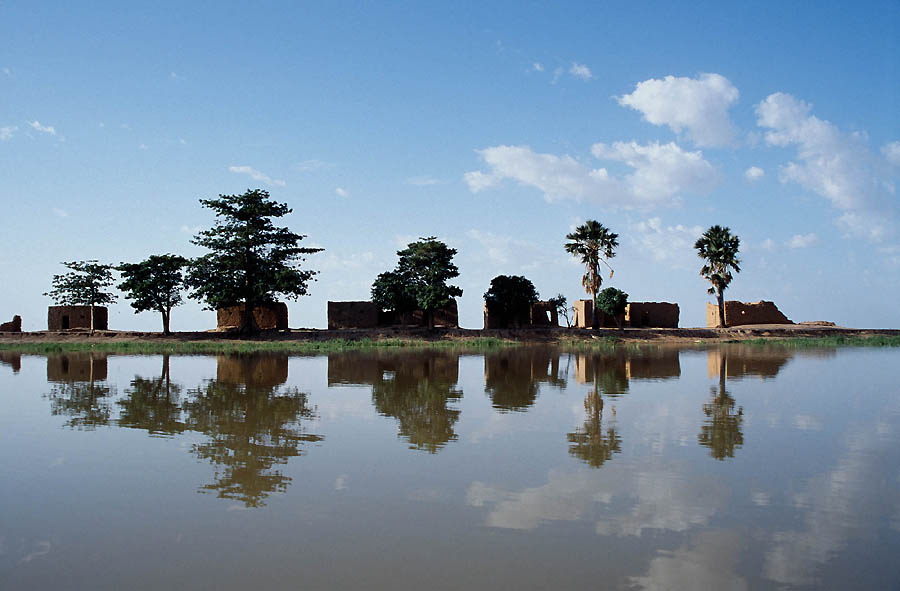
Mud houses on the center island at Lake Debo, a wide section of the Niger River

This is a list of rivers in Niger. This list is arranged by drainage basin, with respective tributaries indented under each larger stream's name.

== Gulf of Guinea ==
- Niger River
  - Sokoto River (Nigeria)
    - Rima River (Nigeria)
      - Goulbi de Maradi River
  - Mékrou River
  - Dallol Maouri
  - Dallol Bosso
    - Vallée de l'Azaouak
      - Vallée de l'Ahzar
      - Oued Ti-n-Amzi
  - Tapoa River
  - Goroubi River
  - Sirba River
  - Dargol River
  - Béli River (Gorouol River)

== Lake Chad ==
- Yobe River
- Dilia River
