= List of rivers of Burkina Faso =

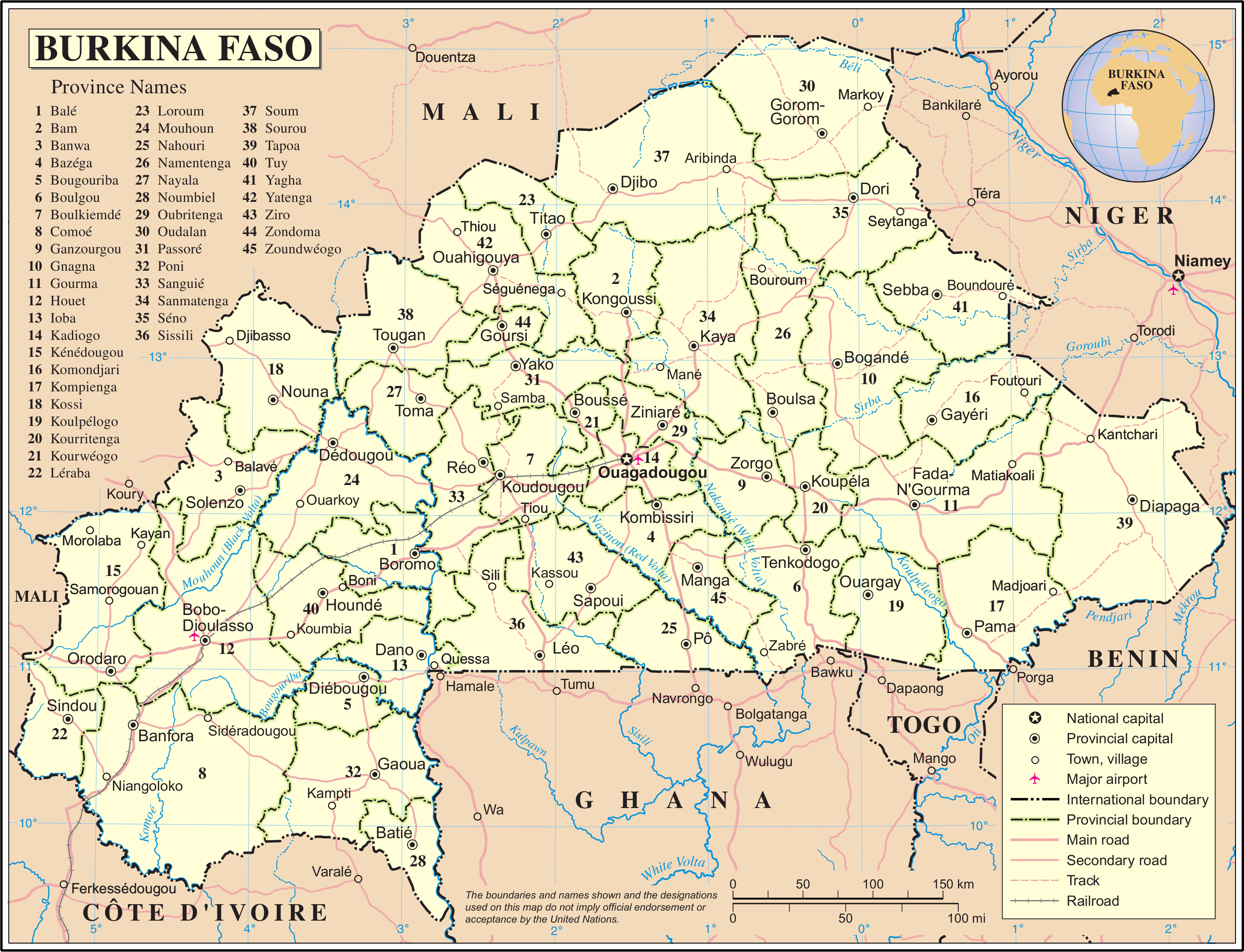
Map of Burkina Faso with main rivers

This is a list of streams and rivers in Burkina Faso. Burkina Faso has three main rivers — the Black Volta, the Red Volta and the White Volta. Areas near rivers are affected by tsetse flies and simulium flies. This list is arranged by drainage basin, with respective tributaries indented under each larger stream's name.

== Gulf of Guinea ==
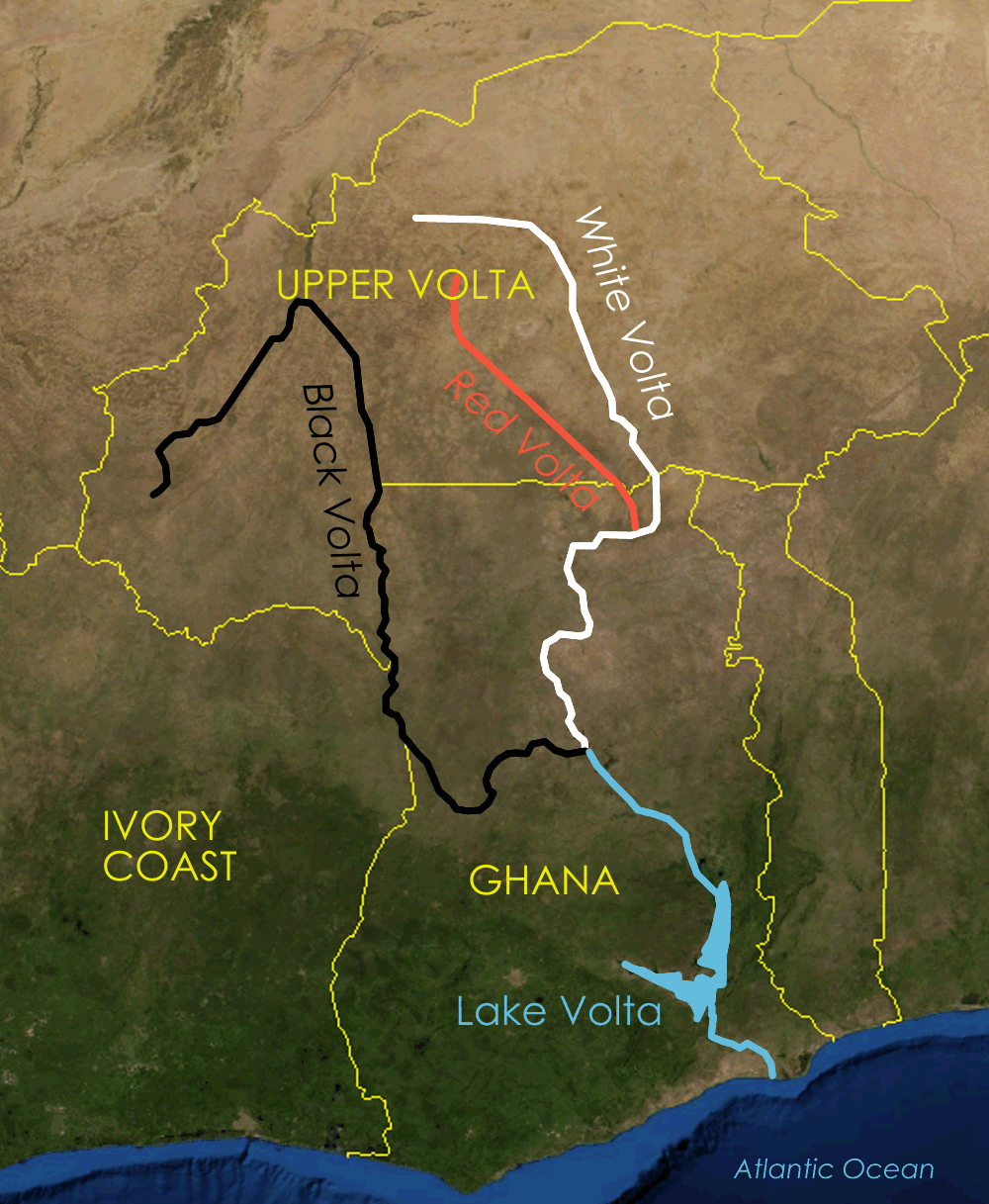
The Volta river system

- Komoé River
  - Iringou River
  - Léraba River
- Volta River (Ghana)
  - Oti River (Pendjari River)
    - Koulpéolgo River
  - Black Volta (Mouhoun River)
    - Bougouriba River
    - Sourou River
  - White Volta (Nakambé)
    - Kulpawn River
      - Sisili River
    - Red Volta (Nazinon)
- Niger River (Niger)
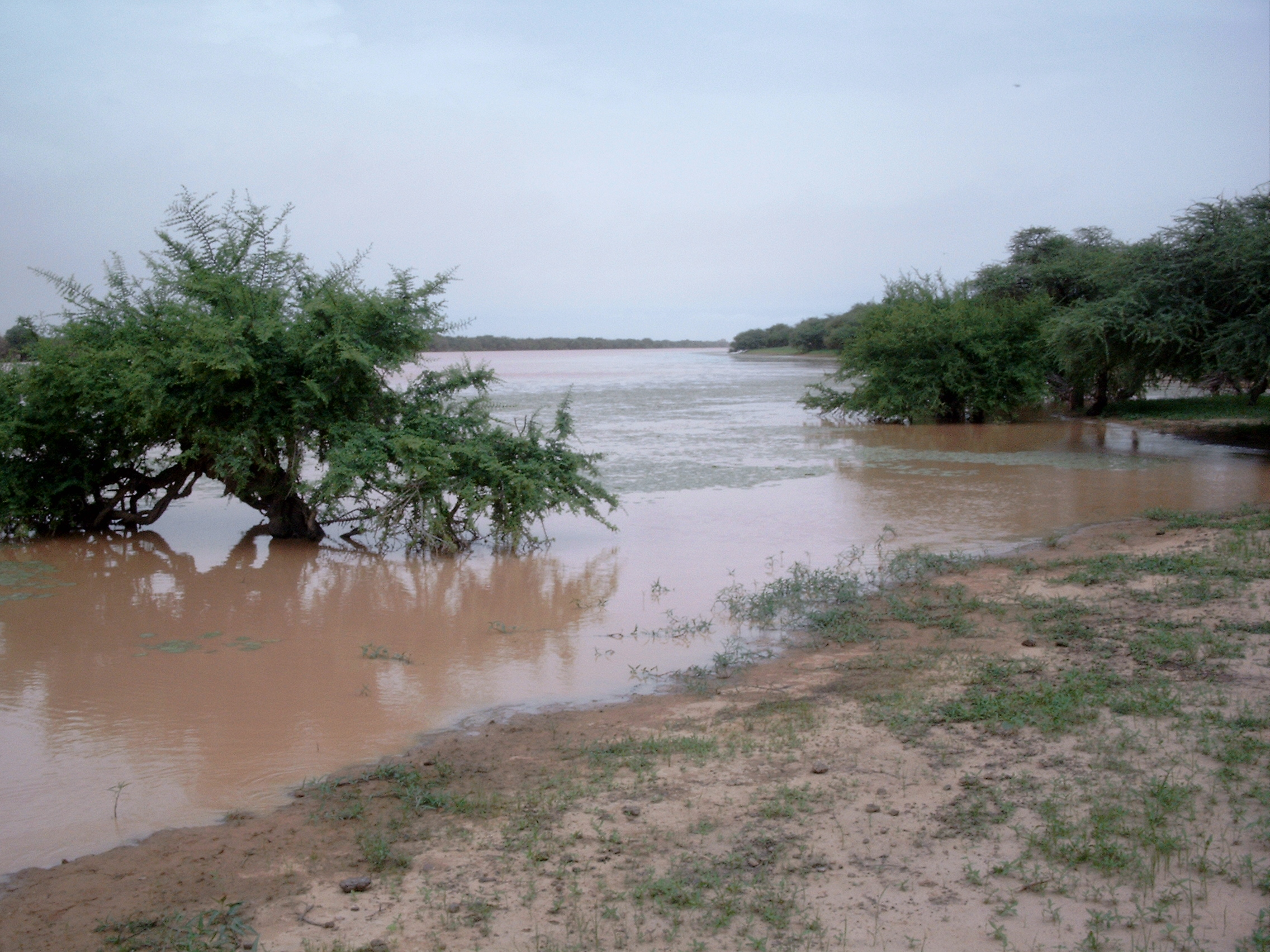
  Béli River in the rainy season
  - Mékrou River
  - Tapoa River
  - Goroubi River
  - Sirba River
  - Béli River
  - Bani River (Mali)
    - Banifing River
