= Mountains of Kong =

Mythical chain of mountains

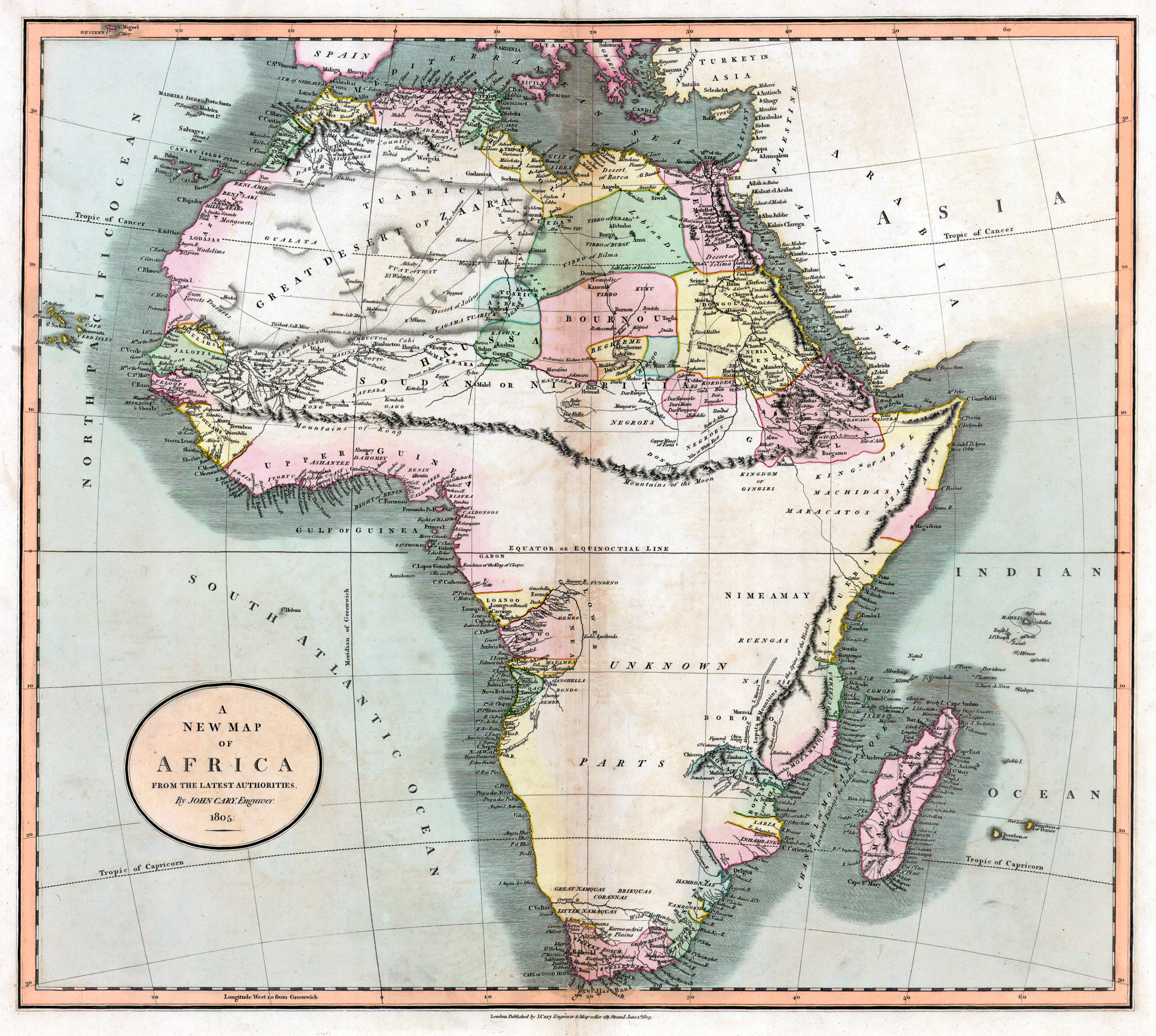
A map of Africa, made by John Cary in 1805, showing the Mountains of Kong extending eastwards to the Mountains of the Moon.

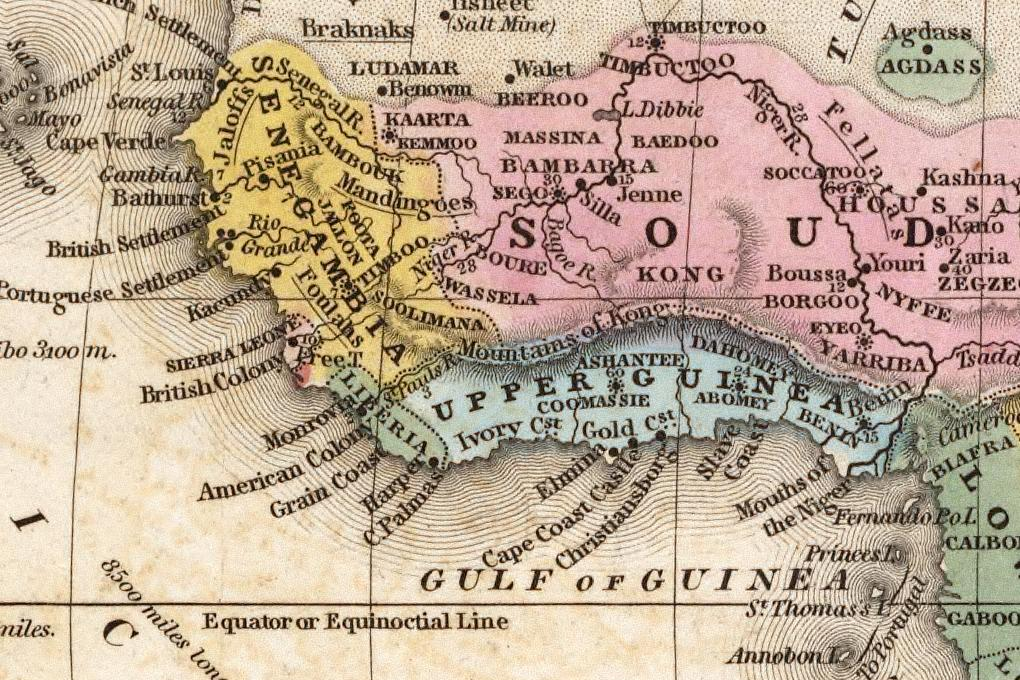
The Mountains of Kong on a West African Map from 1839.

The Mountains of Kong are a legendary mountain range charted on maps of Africa from 1798 through to at least the late 1880s. The mountains were once thought to begin in West Africa near the highland source of the Niger River close to Tembakounda in Guinea, then continue east to the equally legendary Mountains of the Moon in Central Africa, thought to be where the White Nile had its source. None of these mountains actually exist.

== History ==
In 1796 Mungo Park was exploring the regions around the river Niger and his notes say he observed to the South ‘some very distant mountains’ and was told that they lay in a kingdom called Kong.

1798, a map resulting from his exploration of the area showed this west-to-east mountain range for the first time. It was produced by the English cartographer James Rennell, who showed the Niger evaporating inland at Wangara. This range was intended to support his own theory on the course of the Niger River, and eventually led to a major impact on the mapping industry to include the mountains. In 1802, Aaron Arrowsmith released a map that included the Mountains of Kong as a main physical geographic feature of western Africa, which encouraged other publishers to update their maps to match.

The German map-maker Johann Reinecke included the mountains in his map of 1804 as the Gebirge Kong. In 1805, the London engraver John Cary showed them for the first time linking to the Mountains of the Moon.

Various nineteenth-century explorers of West Africa included the range on maps they produced or whose production they directed after exploring the area. These include French explorer René Caillié, who explored the highlands of Guinea at Fouta Djallon, near the source of the Niger; the Cornish explorer Richard Lemon Lander and his younger brother John; and Scottish explorer Hugh Clapperton, who also sought the course of the Niger River in its upper reaches. The historians Thomas Basset and Phillip Porter have identified forty maps, published between 1798 and 1892, showing the mountains.

Despite the failure of other later explorers to locate the range, it continued to appear on maps until late in the nineteenth century.

Cartographers began to stop including the mountains on maps after French explorer Louis Gustave Binger established that the mountains were fictitious, in his 1887–89 expedition to chart the Niger River from its mouth in the Gulf of Guinea and through Côte d'Ivoire.

In 1928, Bartholemew's Oxford Advanced Atlas still contained them in its index locating them at 8° 40' N, 5° 0' W.

== Related namings ==
The town of Kong, Ivory Coast dates to the 12th century and bears the name that it gave to the mountains. This rose in power during the 17th century to form the Kong Empire, which eventually passed under French colonial rule.

== Gallery of maps ==
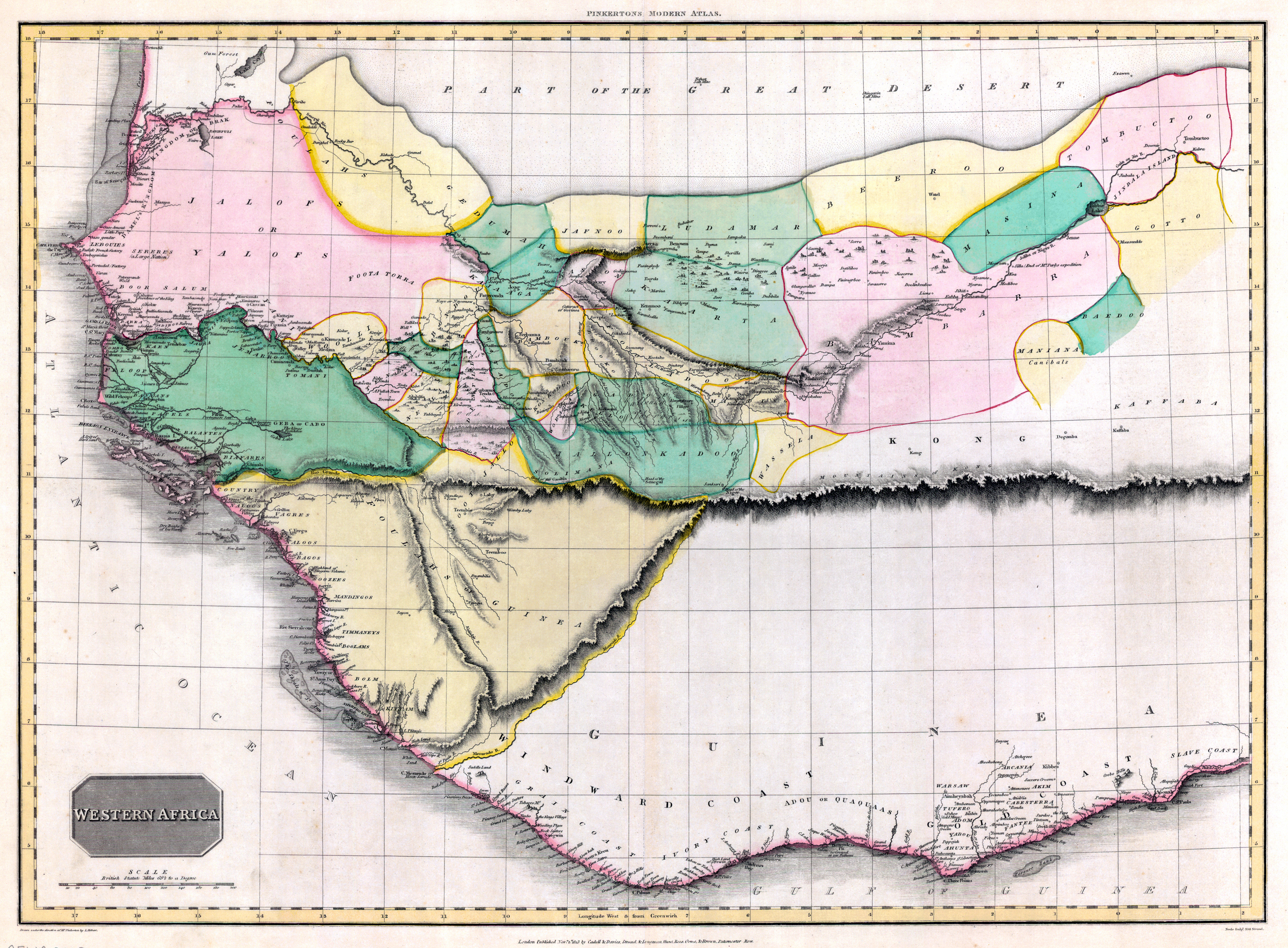
A map of Africa, made by John Pinkerton in 1813.

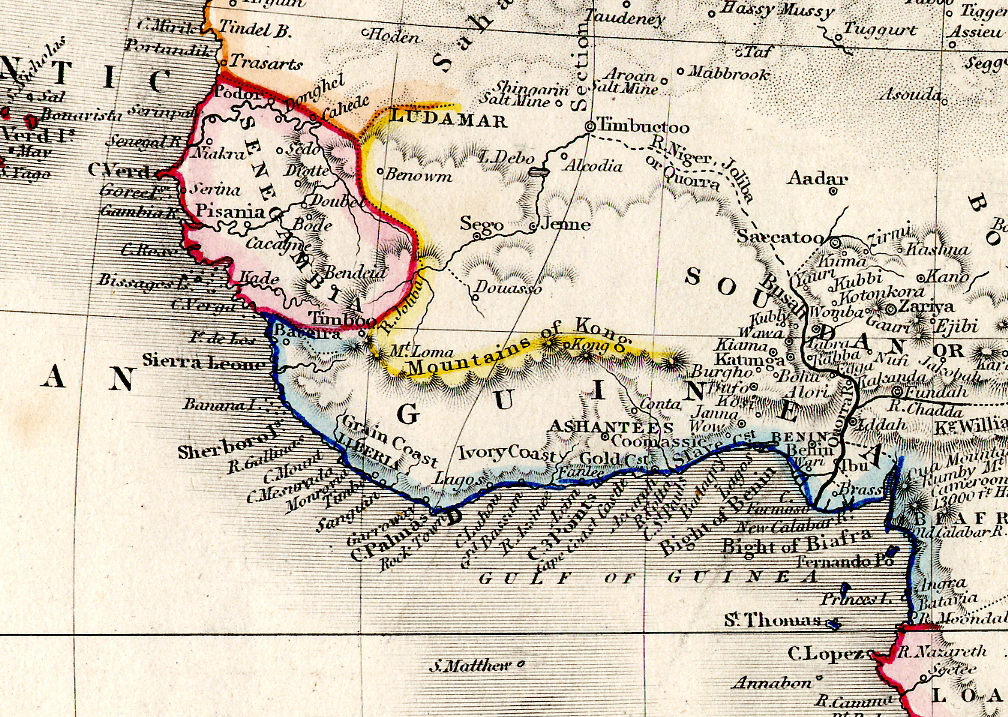
The Mountains of Kong on the "Africa" map in Milner's Atlas, 1850.

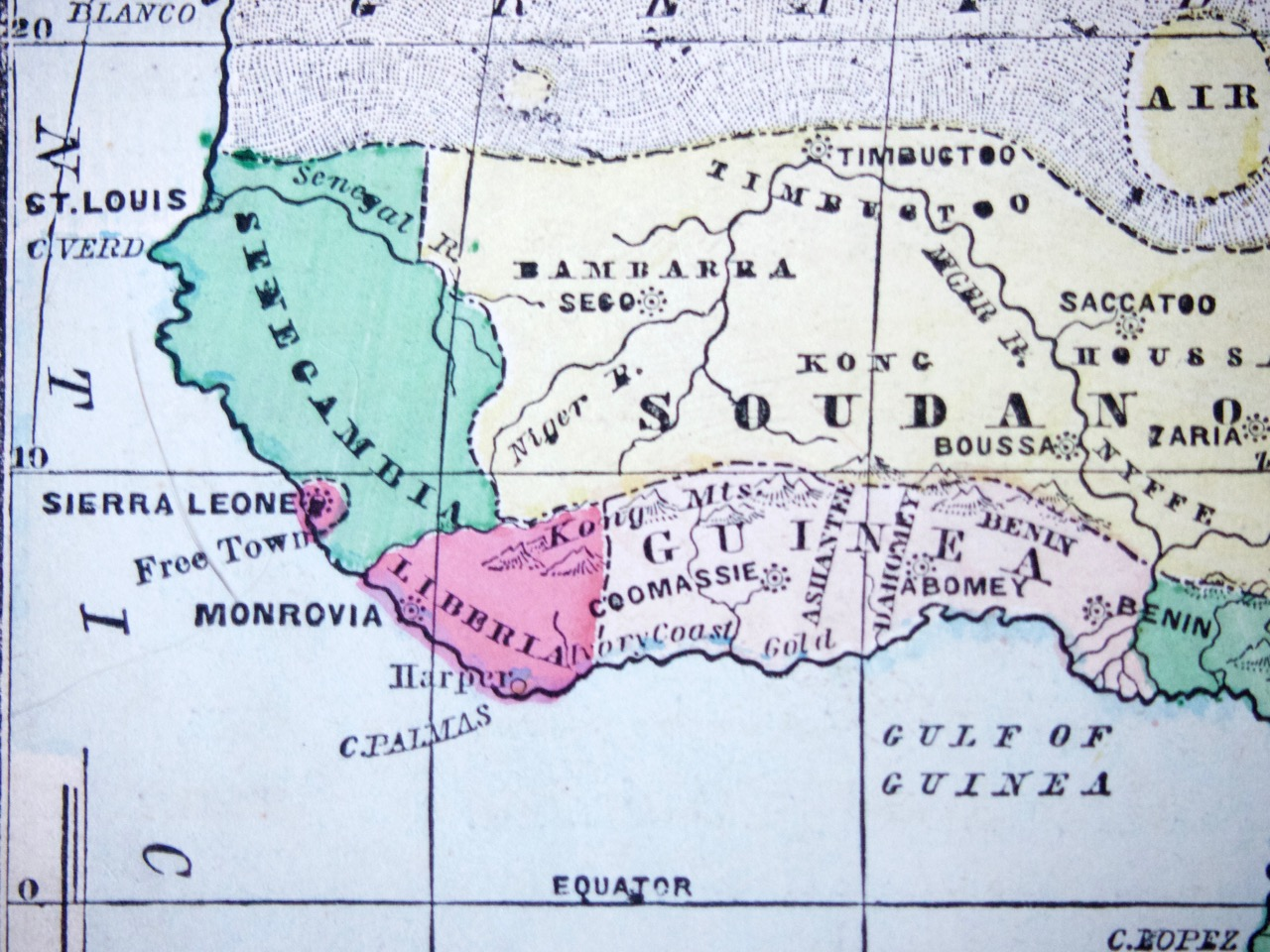
1872 detail of Monteith's lesson book African map.

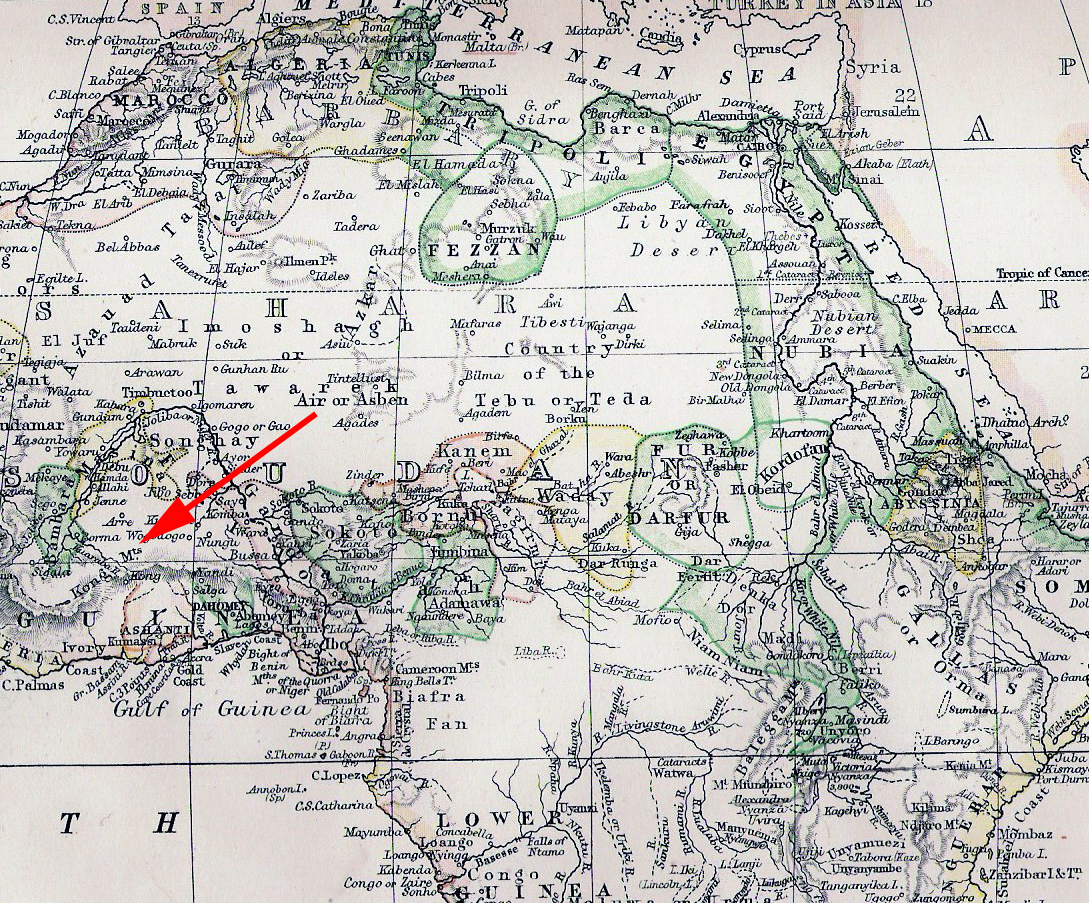
From a 19th-century atlas (1882), "Kong Mountains" marked (red arrow).

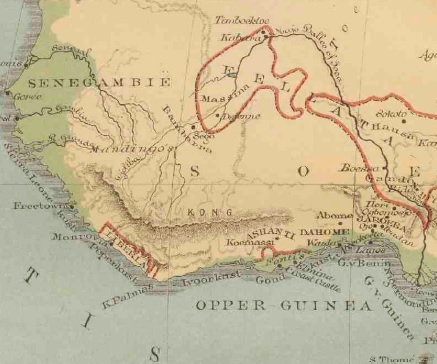
Mountains of Kong in Dutch atlas (1877), situated in western Africa.
