= Gurara =

Gurara may refer to:

- Gurara, Nigeria, a local government area in Nigeria
- Gurara (Algeria), or Gourara, a region of Algeria north of the Tuat
- Gurara language, a Berber language of Algeria

== See also ==
- Gurara Waterfalls, in Nigeria
- Basa-Gurara, a language of Nigeria
