= Tinkisso River =

River in Guinea

Coordinates: 11°21′16″N 9°09′49″W

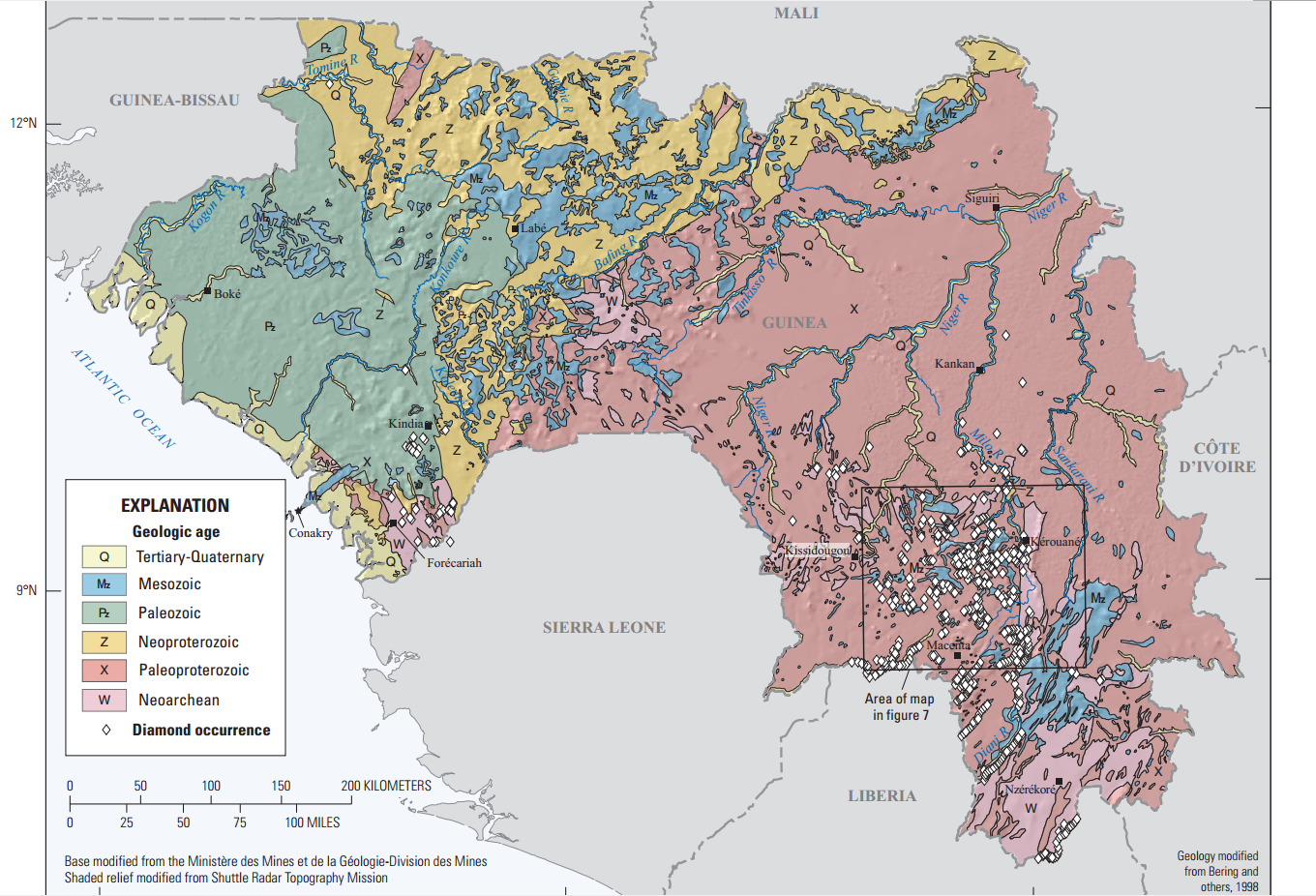
Geological map of Guinea showing the course of the Tinkisso

The Tinkisso River is a river in Guinea in west Africa. The river is sourced near Dalaba in the Fouta Djallon mountain range, north of Mamou and snakes approximately north-east and then east across the plains of Guinea, until it runs into the River Niger at Siguiri. The river is approximately 400 kilometres (250 miles) in length.

The river and the surrounding plains were designated a Ramsar site by the Niger Basin Authority and the Guinean government in 2002. The river and its tributaries are the home to species of manatee.
