= Niger River =

Major river in West Africa

Niger River: Fleuve Niger (French); Joliba (Maninka); Jeluba (Bambara); Mayo Ɓalewo 𞤃𞤢𞥄𞤴𞤮 𞤄𞤢𞤤𞤫𞤮 (Fula); Egerew ⴻⴳⴻⵔⴻⵡ (Tamasheq); Issa Beri (Zarma); Kwara (Hausa); Toru Beni (Ijo languages); Ọya (Yoruba); Óshimiri/ Oshimili (Igbo)
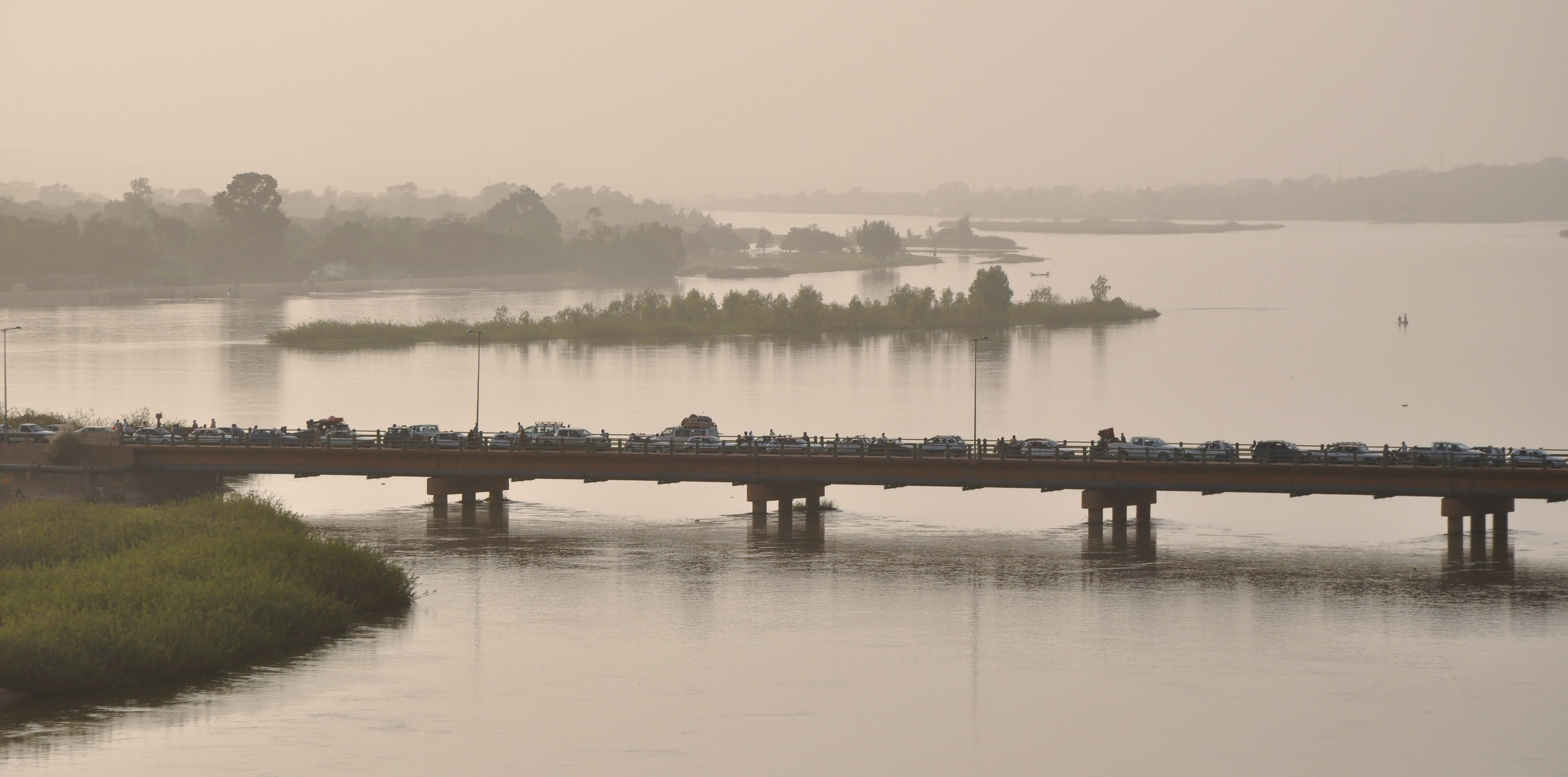
- The Pont Kennedy across the Niger at Niamey, early 2019
- Etymology: Unknown (possibly from Berber for River Gher or local Tuareg word n-igereouen meaning "big rivers")

Location
- Countries: Guinea; Mali; Niger; Benin; Nigeria
- Cities: Tembakounda; Bamako; Timbuktu; Niamey; Lokoja; Onitsha

Physical characteristics
- Source
  - location: Guinea Highlands, Guinea-Conakry
  - coordinates: 09°05′50″N 10°40′58″W
  - elevation: 850 m (2,790 ft)
- Mouth: Atlantic Ocean
  - location: Gulf of Guinea, Nigeria
  - coordinates: 5°19′20″N 6°28′9″E
  - elevation: 0 m (0 ft)
- Length: 4,200 km (2,600 mi)
- Basin size: 2,117,700–2,273,946 km^{2} (817,649–877,975 mi^{2})
- Width
  - average: 1.24 km (0.77 mi) to 1.73 km (1.07 mi) (Lokoja)
- Depth
  - maximum: 37 m (121 ft) (Lokoja)
- Discharge
  - location: Niger Delta
  - average: (Period: 2010–2018)270.5 km^{3}/a (8,570 m^{3}/s) (Note: Multiannual average: 9,275 m³/s (1921–1985))
  - minimum: 3,931 m^{3}/s (138,800 cu ft/s)
  - maximum: 15,200 m^{3}/s (540,000 cu ft/s)
- Discharge
  - location: Onitsha
  - average: (Period: 1971–2000)6,470.8 m^{3}/s (228,510 cu ft/s) (Note: Multiannual average: 7,000 m³/s (1914–1957))
- Discharge
  - location: Lokoja
  - average: (Period: 2000–2025)6,743.2 m^{3}/s (238,130 cu ft/s) (Note: Multiannual average: 6,332 m³/s (1915–2019))
  - minimum: 1,934 m^{3}/s (68,300 cu ft/s) (minimum record in 1916: 500 m³/s)
  - maximum: 21,872 m^{3}/s (772,400 cu ft/s)
- Discharge
  - location: Niamey
  - average: (Period: 2000–2025)978.8 m^{3}/s (34,570 cu ft/s)
  - minimum: 58.2 m^{3}/s (2,060 cu ft/s)
  - maximum: 1,996.6 m^{3}/s (70,510 cu ft/s)
- Discharge
  - location: Bamako
  - average: (Period: 1971–2000)1,091.7 m^{3}/s (38,550 cu ft/s)

Basin features
- Progression: Gulf of Guinea
- River system: Niger River
- Tributaries
  - left: Tinkisso, Sokoto, Kaduna, Gurara, Benue, Anambra
  - right: Niandan, Milo, Sankarani, Bani, Gorouol, Sirba, Goroubi, Mékrou, Alibori, Sota, Oli, Orashi, Warri

The Niger River (/ˈnaɪdʒər/ NY-jər; French: (le) fleuve Niger [(lə) flœv niʒɛʁ]) is the main river of West Africa, extending about 4,180 kilometres (2,600 miles). Its drainage basin is 2,117,700 km^{2} (817,600 sq mi) in area. Its source is in the Guinea Highlands in south-eastern Guinea (Faranah Region) near the Sierra Leone border. It runs in a crescent shape through southwest Mali and through southwest Niger, on the border with Benin, and then through Nigeria, discharging through a massive delta, known as the Niger Delta, into the Gulf of Guinea in the Atlantic Ocean. The Niger is the 14th-longest river in the world, and the third-longest river in Africa, exceeded by the Nile and the Congo River. Its main tributary is the Benue River.

== Etymology ==
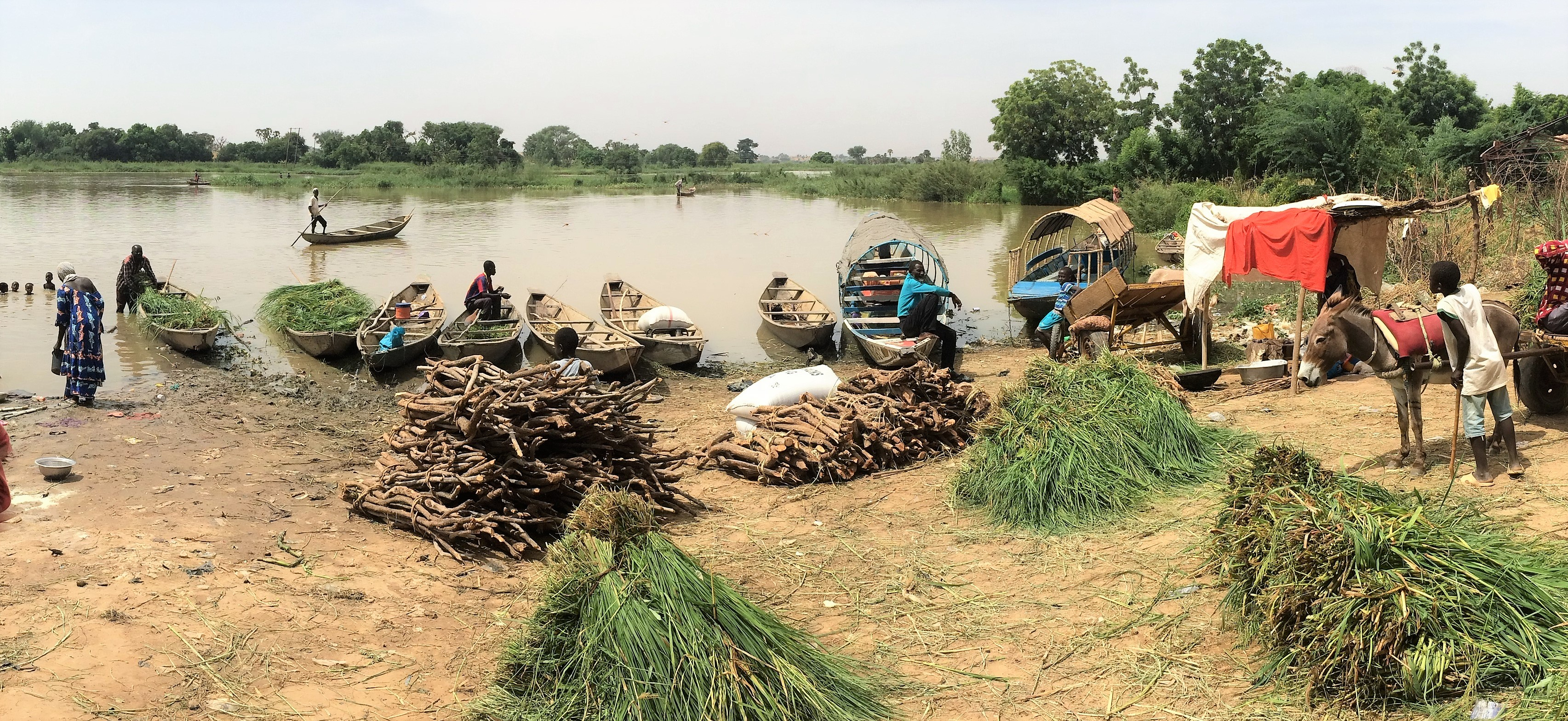
Commercial activity along the river front at Boubon, in Niger

The Niger has different names in the different languages of the region:

- Fula: 𞤃𞤢𞥄𞤴𞤮 𞤔𞤢𞥄𞤤𞤭𞤦𞤢 (Maayo Jaaliba)
- Manding: ߖߋ߬ߟߌߓߊ߬ (Jeliba) or ߖߏ߬ߟߌߓߊ߬ (Joliba, "great river")
- Tuareg: ⴴⵔⵓ ⵏ ⴴⵔⵓⵏ (Eġərəw n-Igərǝwăn, "river of rivers")
- Songhay: Isa "the river"
- Zarma: Isa Beeri "great river"
- Hausa: كوَرَ (Kwara)
- Nupe: Èdù
- Yoruba: Odo Ọya "named after the Yoruba goddess Ọya, who is believed to embody the river"
- Igbo: Orimiri or Orimili "great water"
- Ijaw: Toru Beni "the river water"

The earliest use of the name "Niger" for the river is by Leo Africanus in his Description of Africa, published in Italian in 1550. Nevertheless, "Nigris" was already the name of a river in West Africa, as mentioned by Pliny the Elder and Solinus, among others. Whether this river was the same as the actual Niger, or rather the river also known as Ger (currently known as Oued Guir, in Morocco), is a matter of discussion. This Nigris was said to divide "Africa proper" from the land of the (Western) Ethiopians to the south, and its name (as well as that of the river Ger) might well come from the Berber phrase gr-n-grwn meaning "river of rivers", as the current Tuareg name for the river Niger. As Timbuktu was the southern end of the principal Trans-Saharan trade route to the western Mediterranean, it was the source of most European knowledge of the region.

Medieval European maps applied the name Niger to the middle reaches of the river in modern Mali, but Quorra (Kworra) to the lower reaches in modern Nigeria, as these were not recognized at the time as being the same river. When European colonial powers began to send ships along the west coast of Africa in the 16th and 17th centuries, the Senegal River was often postulated to be the seaward end of the Niger. The Niger Delta, pouring into the Atlantic through mangrove swamps, and thousands of distributaries along more than 160 kilometres (100 mi), was thought to be coastal wetlands. It was only with the 18th-century visits of Mungo Park, who travelled down the Niger River and visited the great Sahelian empires of his day, that Europeans correctly identified the course of the Niger and extended the name to its entire course.

The modern nations of Nigeria, and Niger take their names from the river, marking contesting national claims by colonial powers of the "upper", "lower", and "middle" Niger river basin during the Scramble for Africa at the end of the 19th century.

== Climate ==
As part of the West Africa Sahel region, the Niger River has a hot climate characterized by very high temperatures year-round; a long intense dry season from October to May; and a brief, irregular rainy season linked to the West African monsoon.

== Geography ==
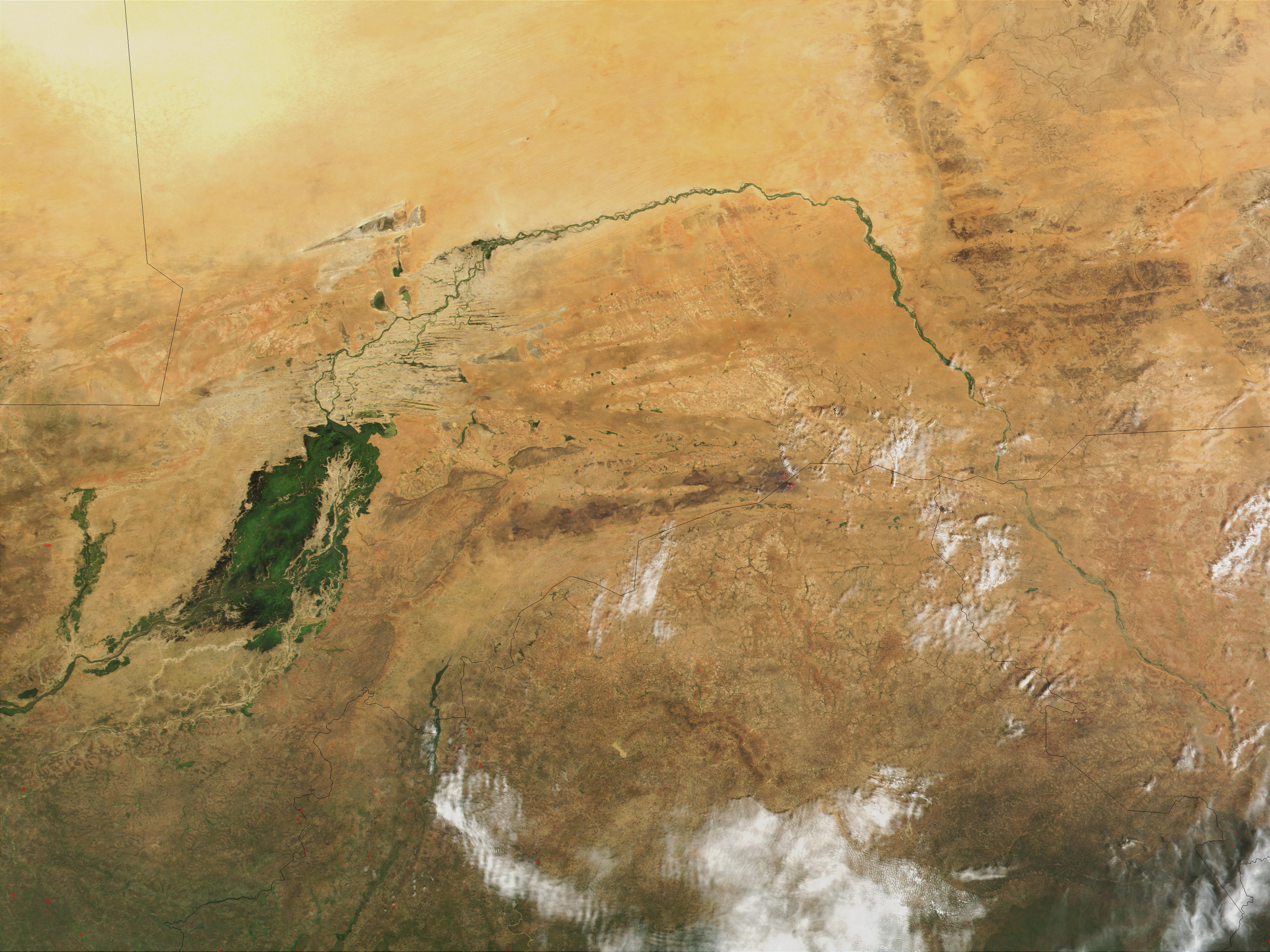
The great bend of the Niger River, seen from space, creates a green arc through the brown of the Sahel and Savanna. The green mass on the left is the Inner Niger Delta, and on the far left are tributaries of the Senegal River.

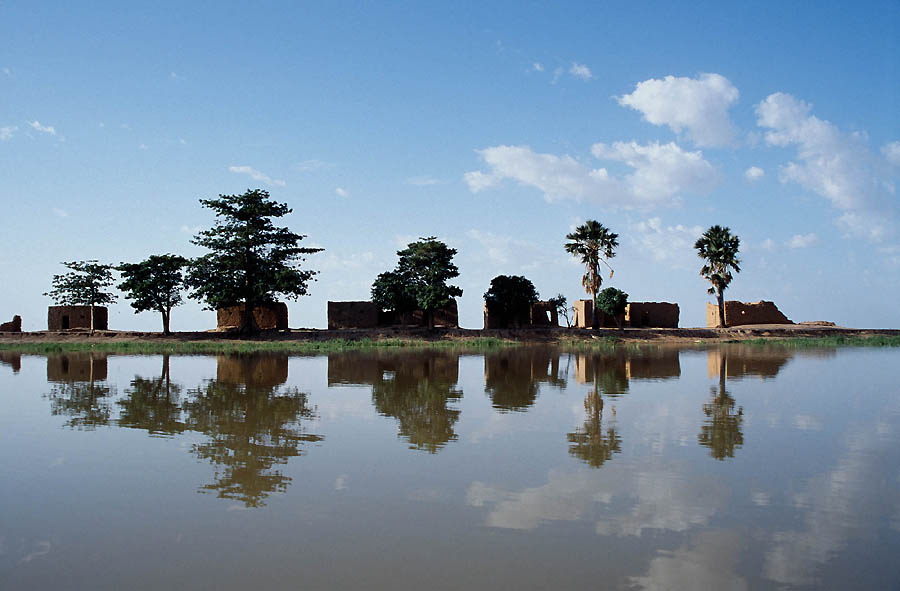
Mud houses on the center island at Lake Debo, a wide section of the Niger River

The Niger River is a relatively clear river, carrying only a tenth as much sediment as the Nile because the Niger's headwaters lie in ancient rocks that provide little silt. Like the Nile, the Niger floods yearly; this begins in September, peaks in November, and finishes by May. An unusual feature of the river is the Inner Niger Delta, which forms where its gradient suddenly decreases. The result is a region of braided streams, marshes, and large lakes; the seasonal floods make the Delta extremely productive for both fishing and agriculture.

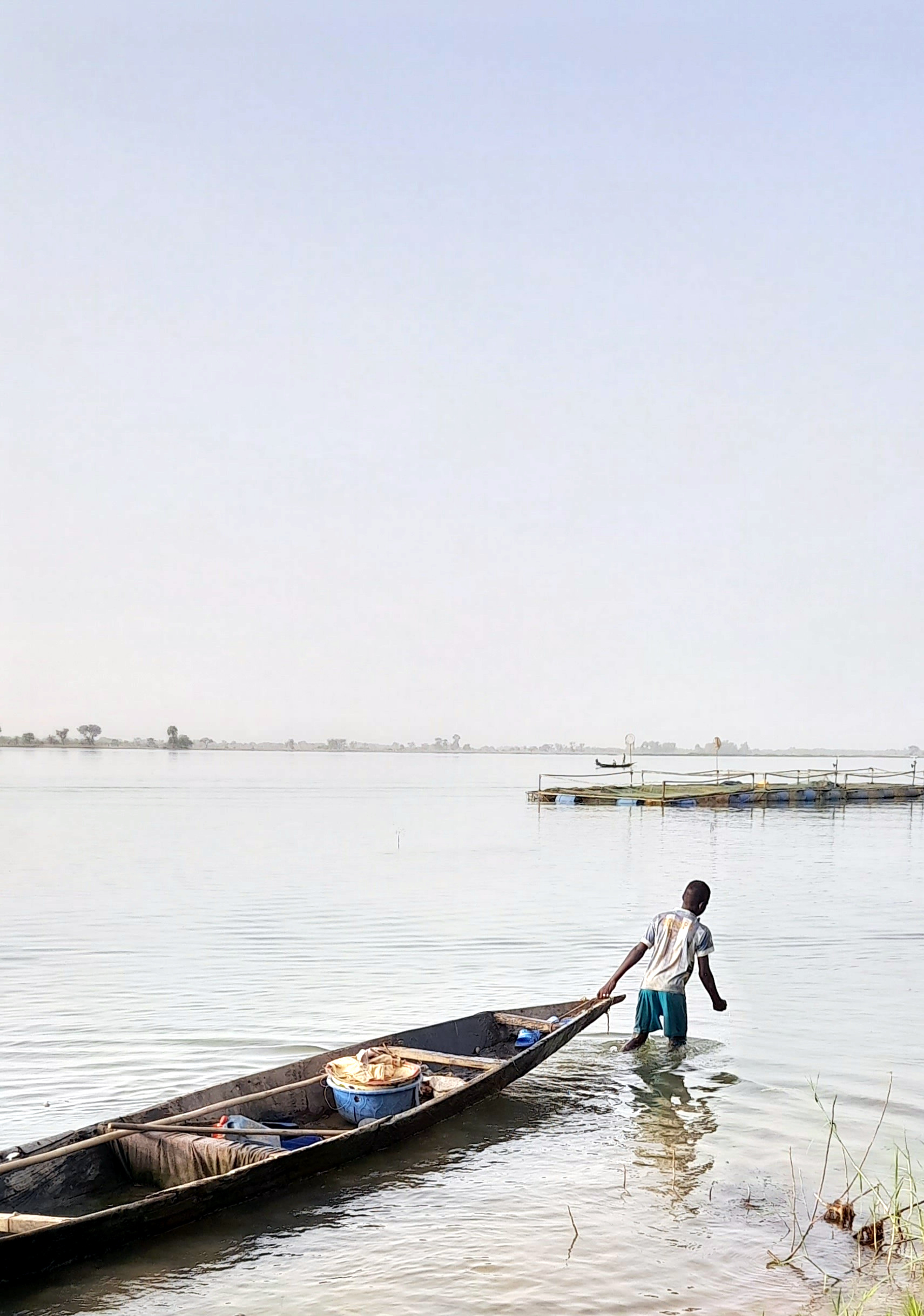
Boy bringing back his canoe on the Niger River (2022)

The river loses nearly two-thirds of its potential flow in the Inner Delta between Ségou, and Timbuktu to seepage and evaporation. The water from the Bani River, which flows into the Delta at Mopti, does not compensate for the losses. The average loss is estimated at 31 km^{3}/year but varies considerably between years. The river is then joined by various tributaries but also loses more water to evaporation. The quantity of water entering Nigeria was estimated at 25 km^{3}/year before the 1980s and at 13.5 km^{3}/year during the 1980s.

The most important tributary is the Benue River which merges with the Niger at Lokoja in Nigeria. The total volume of tributaries in Nigeria is six times higher than the inflow into Nigeria, with a flow near the mouth of the river standing at 177.0 km^{3}/year before the 1980s and 147.3 km^{3}/year during the 1980s.

=== Course ===
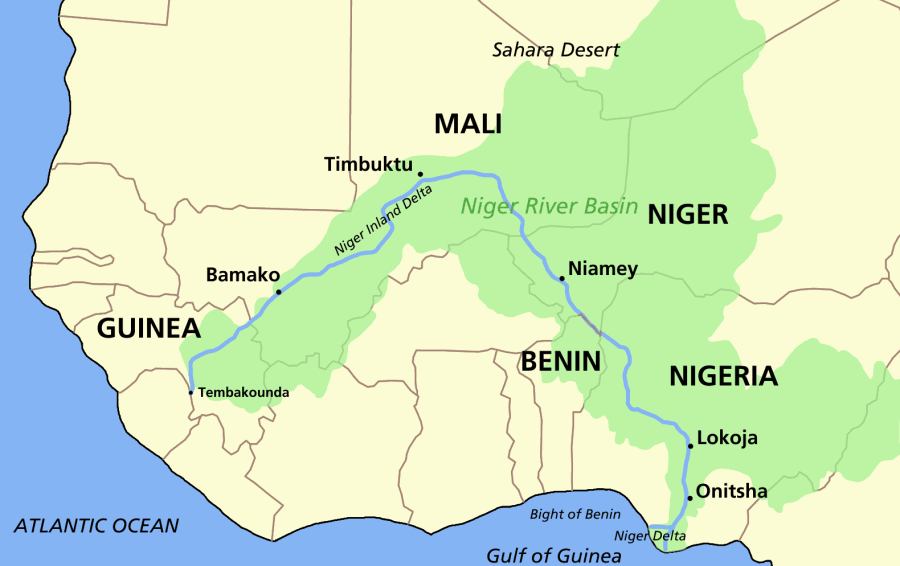
Map of the Niger, showing its watershed, and "inland delta"

The Niger takes one of the most unusual routes of any major river, a boomerang shape that baffled geographers for two centuries. Its source (Tembakounda) is 240 km (150 mi) inland from the Atlantic Ocean, but the river runs directly away from the sea into the Sahara Desert, then takes a sharp right turn near the ancient city of Timbuktu and heads southeast to the Gulf of Guinea. This strange geography apparently came about because the Niger River is two ancient rivers joined together. The upper Niger, from the source west of Timbuktu to the bend in the current river near Timbuktu, once emptied into a now dry lake to the east northeast of Timbuktu, while the lower Niger started to the south of Timbuktu and flowed south into the Gulf of Guinea. Over time upstream erosion by the lower Niger resulted in stream capture of the upper Niger by the lower Niger.

The northern part of the river, known as the Niger bend, is an important area because it is the major river and source of water in that part of the Sahara. This made it the focal point of trade across the western Sahara and the centre of the Sahelian kingdoms of Mali and Gao. The surrounding Niger River Basin is one of the distinct physiographic sections of the Sudan province, which in turn is part of the larger African massive physiographic division.

=== Drainage basin ===
The Niger River basin, located in western Africa, covers 7.5% of the continent and spreads over ten countries.

Niger River basin: areas and rainfall by country

Country	Area of the country within the basin			Average rainfall in the basin (mm)
Country	(km^{2})	(% of total basin)	(% of country within basin)	Average rainfall in the basin (mm)
Algeria	193,449	8.5	8%	20
Benin	46,384	2.0	40%	1,055
Burkina Faso	76,621	3.4	28%	655
Cameroon	89,249	3.9	19%	1,330
Chad	20,339	0.9	1.6%	975
Ivory Coast	23,770	1.0	7%	1,466
Guinea	96,880	4.3	39%	1,635
Mali	578,850	25.5	47%	440
Niger	564,211	24.8	45%	280
Nigeria	584,193	25.7	63%	1,185
For Niger basin	2,273,946	100.0	ns	690

Hydrometric stations on the Niger River:
Station	River kilometer (rkm)	Altitude (m)	Basin size (km^{2})	Multiannual average discharge		
Station	River kilometer (rkm)	Altitude (m)	Basin size (km^{2})	Year start	(m^{3}/s)	(km^{3})
Niger Delta	0	0	2,273,946	1914	7,922.3	250
Lower Niger
Onitsha	270	14	2,240,019	1914	6,470.8	204
Lokoja	480	34	2,204,500	1914	5,754.7	182
Baro	600	47	1,845,300	1914	2,349.8	74
Jebba	810	73	1,751,000	1970	1,457.3	46
Kainji Dam	900	100	1,711,300	1970	1,153.9	36
Middle Niger
Gaya	1,120	156	1,404,600	1929	1,086.7	34
Malanville	1,130	157	1,399,238	1929	1,086.7	34
Niamey	1,420	176	791,121	1929	893.4	28
Ansongo	1,770	241	647,527	1949	806.8	26
Gao	1,860	245	549,876	1947	875.6	28
Timbuktu	2,460	256	382,469	1975	950.7	30
Inner Delta
Diré	2,540	257	372,588	1924	1,113	35
Mopti	2,900	261	308,186	1922	1,742.9	55
Upper Niger
Ké Macina	3,050	271	143,361	1945	1,330	42
Ségou	3,200	280	132,838	1945	1,344.5	42
Koulikoro	3,440	289	119,029	1907	1,351	43
Bamako	3,500	316	114,800	1907	1,371.2	43
Siguiri	3,600	337	67,631	1967	919	29
Kouroussa	3,800	357	18,900	1950	232	7
Faranah	4,040	424	3,196	1950	69.5	2

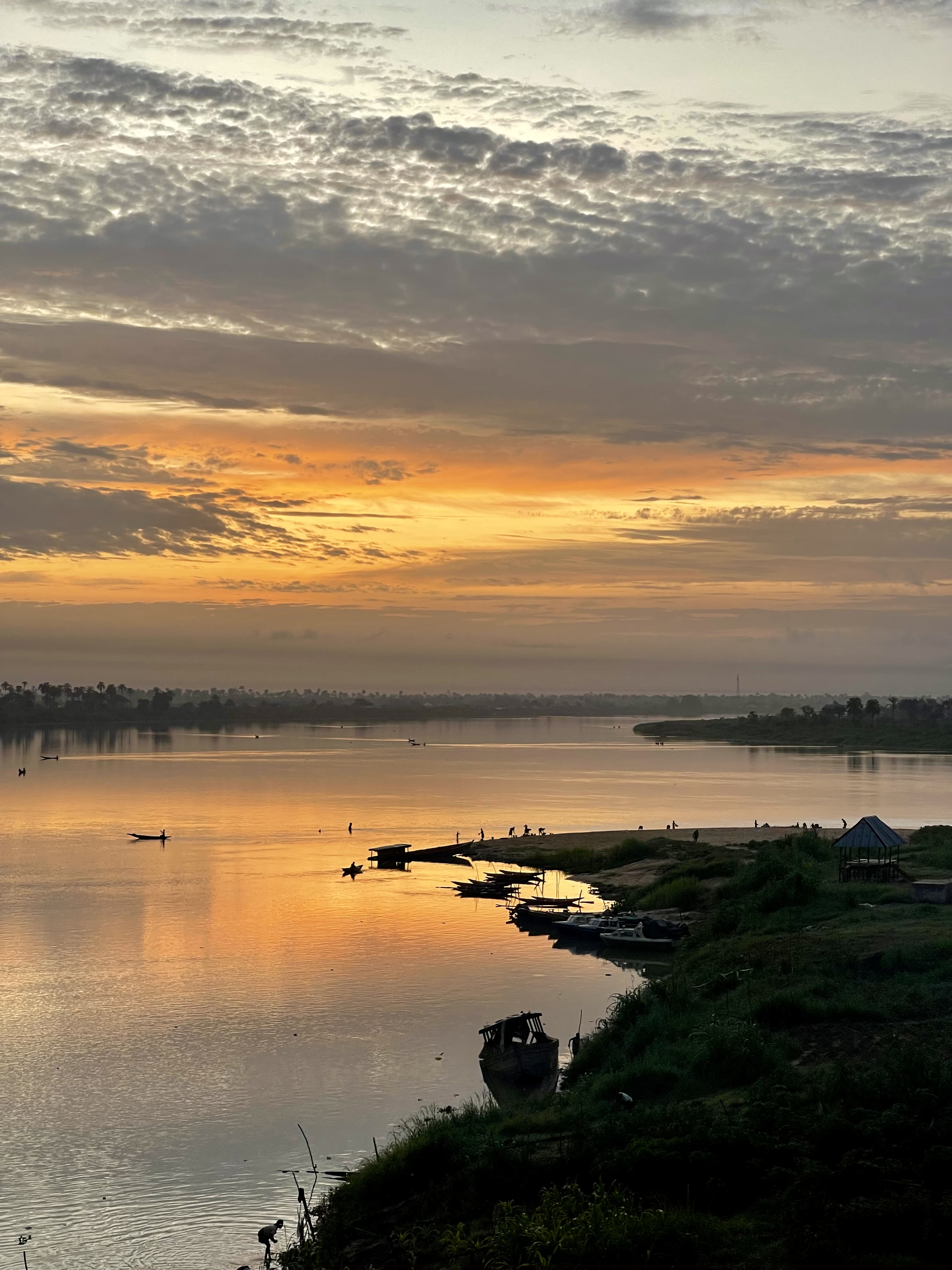
River Niger at Bomadi

== Discharge ==
Average discharge of the Niger River at Niger Delta (period from 2010 to 2018):

Year	Average discharge		
Year	km^{3}	m^{3}/s	cfs
2010	288.1	9,130	322,410
2011	245.7	7,786	274,960
2012	320.3	10,150	358,440
2013	224.4	7,111	251,120
2014	251.2	7,960	281,110
2015	235.3	7,456	263,320
2016	286.8	9,088	320,950
2017	270.9	8,585	303,160
2018	311.6	9,874	348,700
2010–2018	270.5	8,572	302,710

Average, minimum and maximum discharge of the Niger River at Koulikoro (Upper Niger), Niamey (Middle Niger) and Lokoja (Lower Niger). Period from 2000/06/01 to 2025/05/31.
Water year	Discharge (m^{3}/s)								
Water year	Koulikoro			Niamey			Lokoja		
Water year	Min	Mean	Max	Min	Mean	Max	Min	Mean	Max
2000/01	149	1,150	3,860	70.6	942	1,810	2,112	8,504	32,080
2001/02	140	1,270	5,520	48.9	895	1,680	2,157	5,338	18,885
2002/03	177	904	3,120	90.4	796	1,610	2,000	5,297	17,012
2003/04	92.7	1,230	5,210	21.6	922	1,870	1,592	6,225	19,025
2004/05	120	876	3,370	59	890	1,880	2,107	5,683	16,098
2005/06	121	1,060	3,400	73.9	856	1,660	1,801	4,849	13,792
2006/07	143	1,111	3,631	47.4	855	1,710	1,781	5,291	19,389
2007/08	34.2	962	4,854	33.2	925	1,840	2,227	6,767	19,941
2008/09	135	1,443	4,837	34	945	1,830	1,535	6,161	20,426
2009/10	142	1,302	4,660				2,101	7,637	20,534
2010/11	170	1,260	3,916				2,166	7,225	21,272
2011/12	92	924	3,912		801		1,835	5,736	16,912
2012/13	149	1,146	4,562	73	1,115	2,492	1,731	8,612	31,692
2013/14	137	1,080	6,297		852		1,546	5,783	16,430
2014/15	104	863	3,695	53	752	1,542	1,570	6,352	19,664
2015/16	129	1,002	3,719	53	958	2,123	1,753	6,054	27,285
2016/17	106	974	5,845		1,059		2,550	7,272	20,613
2017/18	77	677	2,338	107	801	1,791	2,058	6,781	21,020
2018/19	43	1,256	7,555		1,223		2,046	7,900	25,612
2019/20	174	933	4,158	10	1,060	2,677	1,594	8,751	24,800
2020/21	66	999	5,023	58	1,418	3,398	2,131	7,570	28,082
2021/22	77	824	3,275	135	1,106	2,121	2,021	5,913	17,688
2022/23	66	891	3,851	44	1,074	1,869	1,997	8,288	33,136
2023/24	55	748	3,401	44	874	1,595	2,107	7,491	20,578
2024/25	55	1,331	6,192	49	1,394	2,438	1,826	7,100	24,835

Niger River at Lokoja average, minimum and maximum discharge (1946 to 2023):
Water year	Discharge (m^{3}/s)			Water year	Discharge (m^{3}/s)		
Water year	Min	Mean	Max	Water year	Min	Mean	Max
1946/47	788	4,824	16,600	1985/86	1,110	4,601	15,800
1947/48	1,010	6,258	21,000	1986/87	1,210	4,027	11,400
1948/49	915	6,427	20,900	1987/88	1,390	3,849	11,800
1949/50	842	5,849	19,200	1988/89	1,070	4,615	15,100
1950/51	935	4,755	15,000	1989/90	1,110	5,589	16,300
1951/52	1,290	6,662	20,400	1990/91	1,790	5,045	14,800
1952/53	2,260	5,674	18,300	1991/92	1,770	6,387	18,400
1953/54	1,840	6,405	18,500	1992/93	1,930	5,570	15,300
1954/55	2,130	7,733	24,900	1993/94	1,949	4,908	11,895
1955/56	2,400	8,247	24,600	1994/95	1,945	5,915	20,418
1956/57	1,870	5,394	18,100	1995/96	1,945	6,284	17,713
1957/58	1,480	7,769	23,600	1996/97	2,103	6,020	19,914
1958/59	2,020	4,828	14,700	1997/98	2,406	5,677	15,548
1959/60	1,530	5,228	18,300	1998/99	2,315	7,175	23,491
1960/61	1,250	6,707	22,200	1999/00	2,618	7,652	23,090
1961/62	979	4,912	15,500	2000/01	2,112	8,504	32,080
1962/63	1,150	7,101	24,100	2001/02	2,157	5,338	18,885
1963/64	1,710	6,764	20,500	2002/03	2,000	5,297	17,012
1964/65	1,160	6,128	20,800	2003/04	1,592	6,225	19,025
1965/66	1,310	5,914	18,600	2004/05	2,107	5,683	16,098
1966/67	1,320	6,545	20,000	2005/06	1,801	4,849	13,792
1967/68	928	5,812	19,700	2006/07	1,781	5,291	19,389
1968/69	1,720	6,558	18,800	2007/08	2,227	6,767	19,941
1969/70	1,630	7,927	23,500	2008/09	1,535	6,161	20,426
1970/71	1,640	6,229	20,100	2009/10	2,101	7,637	20,534
1971/72	1,270	5,360	17,600	2010/11	2,166	7,225	21,272
1972/73	1,410	4,489	14,400	2011/12	1,835	5,736	16,912
1973/74	839	3,698	12,200	2012/13	1,731	8,612	31,692
1974/75	832	5,275	17,100	2013/14	1,546	5,783	16,430
1975/76	1,300	5,848	19,600	2014/15	1,570	6,352	19,664
1976/77	1,320	5,136	12,000	2015/16	1,753	6,054	27,285
1977/78	1,310	4,662	15,500	2016/17	2,550	6,555	20,613
1978/79	1,080	5,636	17,000	2017/18	2,058	6,781	21,020
1979/80	1,210	5,510	17,800	2018/19	2,046	7,900	25,612
1980/81	1,400	5,215	16,700	2019/20	1,594	8,751	24,800
1981/82	1,340	5,312	18,400	2020/21	2,131	7,570	28,082
1982/83	1,330	4,270	11,600	2021/22	2,021	5,913	17,688
1983/84	862	2,877	9,180	2022/23	1,997	8,288	33,136
1984/85	862	3,058	8,490	2023/24	2,107	7,491	20,578

== Tributaries ==
The main tributaries from the mouth:

Left tributary	Right tributary	Length (km)	Basin size (km^{2})	Average discharge (m^{3}/s)
Niger Delta
Sombreiro		60	1,500	65
	Warri	100	1,300	38.3
	Okpare	40	1,100	73.1
	Eriola	50	1,000	30.8
Ase (Asse)		180	3,500	133.6
	Orashi	205	2,800	147.8
Lower Niger
Anambra		256	14,014	400.3
	Otaw	40	1,100	48.9
	Awele (Edien)	80	3,300	111.2
	Ubo	70	1,400	25.8
	Aguro	70	1,900	28.9
	Oiryi (Oji)	67.72	927	15.7
Benue		1,400	338,385	3,477
Gurara		570	15,254	183.9
	Epu	80	800	11.7
Etsuan		70	1,450	16.6
	Kampe	175	9,560	126.5
Gbako		156	7,540	89.8
Kaduna		575	65,878	641.5
	Oro	113	4,500	71
Yunko		70	1,698	15.9
	Oyi	120	2,100	30.2
	Oshin	125	2,132	27.5
	Awun	115.5	6,300	81
Eku		90	3,230	25.3
	Moshi	232.22	9,400	69.5
	Oli	300	11,200	86.6
Kontagora		150	4,500	30.8
	Tama	55	900	4
	Menai	80	1,300	8.7
	Swashi	100	1,500	10.4
	Kpan	70	1,800	11.6
Malendo		220	9,127	62.9
Baduru		75	1,500	9.8
Dan Zakhi		110	3,000	26.7
Sokoto		628	193,000	294.1
	Shodu	100	3,900	22.3
Dallol Maouri		250	72,551	10.5
	Sota	254	13,500	50.3
	Alibori	408	13,650	55.6
	Diare	90	2,000	5.6
Middle Niger
Dallol Bosso		350	556,000	4.4
	Mékrou	410	10,635	32.5
	Tapoa	260	5,500	10.2
	Diamangou	200	4,400	5.5
	Goroubi	433	15.500	10.2
	Sirba	439	39,138	27.2
	Gorouol	250	60,842	9
Tilemsi			93,920	
Inner Delta
	Bani	1,100	129,400	559
Upper Niger
	Sankarani	679	33,288	305.6
	Fié	210	4,045	31.7
Koda (Koba)		80	4,940	7.7
Tinkisso		570	19,430	181
	Milo	430	13,590	188
	Niandan	300	12,930	251
	Mafou	160	4,075	62.3
Niantan		60		12.1
Bale		80		31.6

== History ==
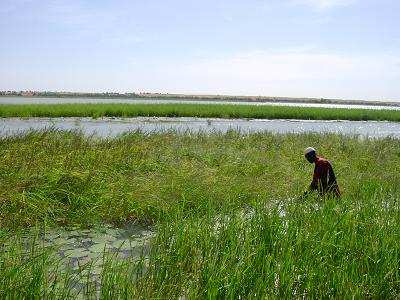
Growing African rice, Oryza glaberrima along the Niger River in Niger. The crop was first domesticated along the river.

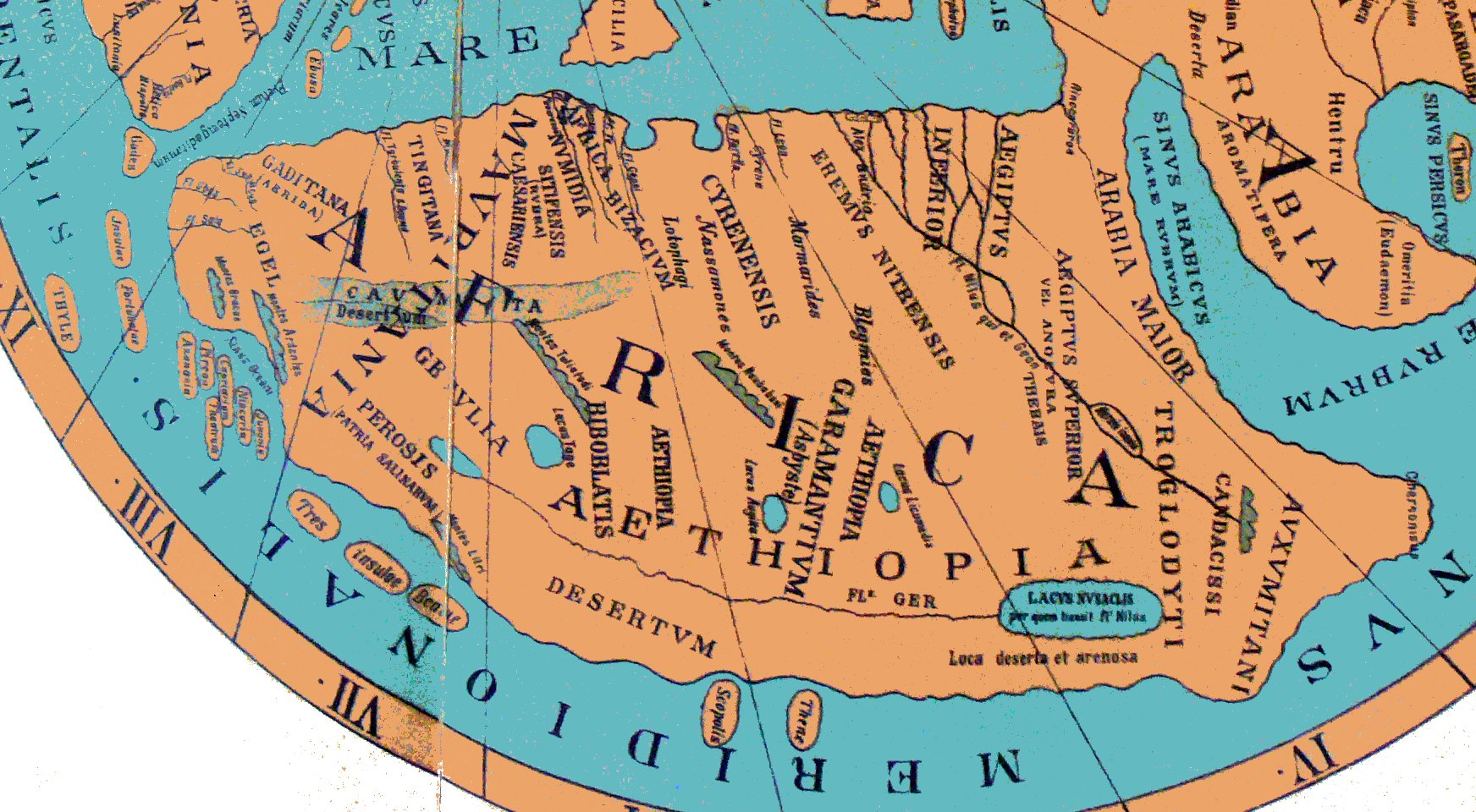
A reconstruction of the Ravenna Cosmography placed on a Ptolemaic map. The River Ger is visible at bottom. Note it is placed, following Ptolemy, as just south of the land of the Garamantes, in modern Libya, constricting the continent to the land from the central Sahara north.

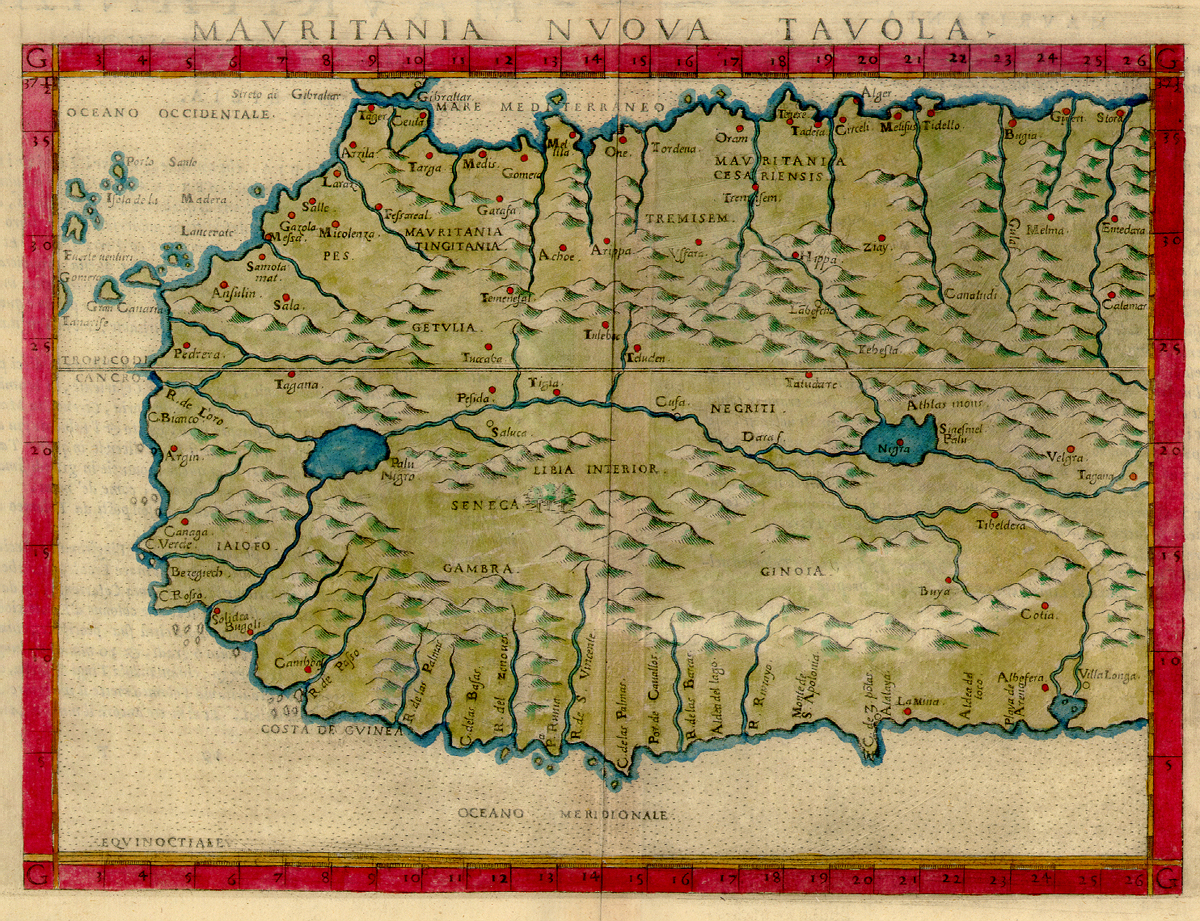
1561 map of West Africa by Girolamo Ruscelli, from Italian translation of Ptolemy's Atlas "La geografia di Claudio Tolomeo alessandrino, Nuovamente tradotta di Greco in Italiano". The writer was attempting to square information gleaned from Portuguese trade along the coast with Ptolemy's world map. The mouths of the Senegal River and Gambia River are postulated to flow into a lake, which also feeds the "Ger"/"Niger River", which in turn feeds the "Nile Lake" and Nile River.

At the end of the African humid period around 5,500 years before present, the modern Sahara Desert, once a savanna, underwent desertification. As plant species sharply declined, humans migrated to the fertile Niger River bend region, with abundant resources including plants for grazing and fish. Like in the Fertile Crescent, many food crops were domesticated in the Niger River region, including yams, African rice (Oryza glaberrima), and pearl millet. The Sahara aridification may have triggered, or at least accelerated, these domestications. Agriculture, as well as fishing and animal husbandry, led to the rise of settlements like Djenné-Djenno in the Inner Delta, now a World Heritage Site.

The region of the Niger bend, in the Sahel, was a key origin and destination for trans-Saharan trade, fueling the wealth of great empires such as the Ghana, Mali, and Songhai Empires. Major trading ports along the river, including Timbuktu and Gao, became centers of learning and culture. Trade to the Niger bend region also brought Islam to the region in approximately the 14th century CE. Much of the northern Niger basin remains Muslim today, although the southern reaches of the river tend to be Christian.

Classical writings on the interior of the Sahara begin with Ptolemy, who mentions two rivers in the desert: the "Gir" (Γειρ) and farther south, the "Nigir" (Νιγειρ). The first has been since identified as the Wadi Ghir on the north-western edge of the Tuat, along the borders of modern Morocco and Algeria. This would likely have been as far as Ptolemy would have had consistent records. The Ni-Ger was likely speculation, although the name stuck as that of a river south of the Mediterranean's "known world". Suetonius reports Romans traveling to the "Ger", although in reporting any river's name derived from a Berber language, in which "gher" means "watercourse", confusion could easily arise. Pliny connected these two rivers as one long watercourse which flowed (via lakes and underground sections) into the Nile, a notion which persisted in the Arab and European worlds – and further added the Senegal River as the "Ger" – until the 19th century.

While the true course of the Niger was presumably known to locals, it was a mystery to the outside world until the late 18th century. The connection to the Nile River was made not simply because this was then known as the great river of "Aethiopia" (by which all lands south of the desert were called by Classical writers), but because the Nile like the Niger flooded every summer. Through the descriptions of Leo Africanus and even Ibn Battuta – despite his visit to the river – the myth connecting the Niger to the Nile persisted.

Many European expeditions to plot the river were unsuccessful. In 1788 the African Association was formed in England to promote the exploration of Africa in the hopes of locating the Niger, and in June 1796 the Scottish explorer Mungo Park was the first European to lay eyes on the middle portion of the river since antiquity (and perhaps ever). He wrote an account in 1799, Travels in the Interior of Africa. Park proposed a theory that the Niger and Congo were the same river. Although the Niger Delta would seem like an obvious candidate, it was a maze of streams and swamps that did not look like the head of a great river. He died in 1806 on a second expedition attempting to prove the Niger-Congo connection. The theory became the leading one in Europe. Several failed expeditions followed; however the mystery of the Niger would not be solved for another 25 years, in 1830, when Richard Lander and his brother became the first Europeans to follow the course of the Niger to the ocean.

In 1946, three Frenchmen, Jean Sauvy, Pierre Ponty and movie maker Jean Rouch, former civil servants in the African French colonies, set out to travel the entire length of the river, as no one else seemed to have done previously. They travelled from the beginning of the river near Kissidougou in Guinea, walking at first till a raft could be used, then changing to various local crafts as the river broadened and changed. Two of them reached the ocean on March 25, 1947, with Ponty having left the expedition at Niamey, somewhat past the halfway mark. They carried a 16mm movie camera, the resulting footage giving Rouch his first two ethnographic documentaries: "Au pays des mages noirs", and "La chasse à l'hippopotame". A camera was used to illustrate Rouch's subsequent book "Le Niger En Pirogue" (Fernand Nathan, 1954), as well as Sauvy's "Descente du Niger" (L'Harmattan, 2001). A typewriter was brought as well, on which Ponty produced newspaper articles he mailed out whenever possible.

== Management and development ==
The water in the Niger River basin is partially regulated through dams. In Mali the Sélingué Dam on the Sankarani River is mainly used for hydropower but also permits irrigation. Two diversion dams, one at Sotuba just downstream of Bamako, and one at Markala, just downstream of Ségou, are used to irrigate about 54,000 hectares. In Nigeria the Kainji Dam, Shiroro Dam, Zungeru Dam, and Jebba Dam are used to generate hydropower.

The water resources of the Niger River are under pressure because of increased water abstraction for irrigation. The construction of dams for hydropower generation is underway or envisaged in order to alleviate chronic power shortages in the countries of the Niger basin. The FAO estimates the irrigation potential of all countries in the Niger river basin at 2.8 million hectares. Only 0.93m hectares (ha) were under irrigation in the late 1980s. The irrigation potential was estimated at 1.68m ha in Nigeria 0.56m ha in Mali, and the actual irrigated area was 0.67m ha and 0.19m ha.

== Trade routes and ecological importance in West Africa ==
The Niger River is a key river of West Africa and it is considered the third-longest river in Africa. The river extends approximately 2,600 miles from its source in the Fouta Djallon Highlands of Guinea through Mali, Niger, Benin, and Nigeria before emptying into the Gulf of Guinea. For close to centuries, The Niger River has been a vital economic lifeline, transportation for the peoples and the states of West Africa.

=== Trade routes of the Niger River ===
According to history, the Niger River has served as important trade and transportation corridors in West Africa. The river flows through Mali, Guinea, Niger, Benin, and Nigeria, the river facilitated the movement of goods and people across the region long before the invention of modern transportation systems like ships, and aeroplanes. During the middle ages, the river supported Ghanaians, Malians, and the Songhai Empires by connecting inland settlements with trans-Saharan trade routes.

==== Goods traded ====
The commodities transported along the Niger River were:

1. Gold
2. Salt
3. Kola nuts
4. Agricultural produce
5. Fish
6. Livestock
7. Textiles
8. Slaves

In recent times, the Niger River remains an important inland waterway supporting commerce, trade and transport. The river transport contributes to economic development, particularly in rural areas.

=== Ecological importance ===
The Niger River is one of Africa's most significant ecological systems. The Niger river basin supports many diverse habitats, including aquatic life, floodplains, savannas and forest reserves. The Inner Niger Delta, serves as a habitat for large species of migratory birds, fish, reptiles and mammals. The Inner Niger Delta covers approximately 20,000 km^{2} in the wet seasons and 3,900 km^{2} in the dry season, serving as a vital resource for fishing, farming and pastoralism that sustains millions of lives.

The Niger River is also the major source of freshwater for domestic use, irrigation and hydroelectric power generation. The Niger River waters irrigates extensive agricultural produce, such as millet, rice and vegetable cultivation. Additionally, the river helps regulate local climates by maintaining wetlands.

The Niger River faces multiple challenges including climate change, pollution, deforestation, overfishing and the construction of dams. These challenges pose a threat to both the ecological health of the river and the livelihoods of the populations that depends on its resources and life. In essence, sustainable management of the Niger River Basin is considered essential for the long-term economic and environmental safety of West Africa. Management authorities like the Niger Basin Authority (NBA) seeks to address these challenges to encourage management of this vital waterway. Another regulatory authority is the Integrated Water Resource Management (IWRM) is recognised as a body that promotes sustainable resource use across the basin's nine countries.

== See also ==
- Azawagh – Dry basin that once carried a northern tributary of the Niger River
- Niger Basin Authority – Intergovernmental organization in West Africa
