= Gurara Waterfalls =

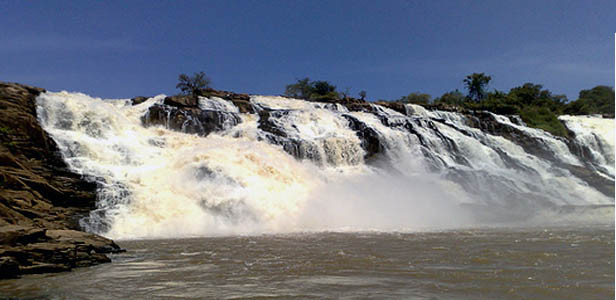
- Front view of the Gurara Waterfalls

- Location within Nigeria
- Location: Gurara, Niger State, Nigeria
- Coordinates: 9°18′52″N 7°01′16″E
- Type: Segmented
- Total height: 30 m (98 ft)
- Total width: 200 m (656 ft)

Gurara Waterfalls is located in Gurara, a local government area of Niger State, North Central Nigeria. The waterfalls is approximately 30 metres in height and it lies on the Gurara River along the Suleja-Minna Road.

== Myth and folklore ==
According to oral history, Gurara Waterfalls was discovered by a Gwari hunter called Buba in 1745 before some Europeans discovered it in 1925 after they found it as a recreation centre. Prior to the discovery of the waterfalls by the Europeans, Gurara Waterfalls was worshipped by people living in communities around it. Oral history also has it that Gurara Waterfalls and Gurara River were named after two deities called Gura and Rara.

== Tourism ==
Despite its chequered history, Gurara Waterfalls is one of the major tourist sites in Nigeria. There have been plans in recent times to turn it into a resort with a recreation centre and a seven-star hotel around it.

== Climate ==
Gurara waterfall has a semi-arid climate. Temperatures are generally warm to hot throughout the year, with average yearly temperatures around 68 °F (20 °C). Rainy season typically occurs from May to September, while the dry season lasts from October to April. The wind from the southwest and will blow at speeds of 10-38 kilometers per hour.

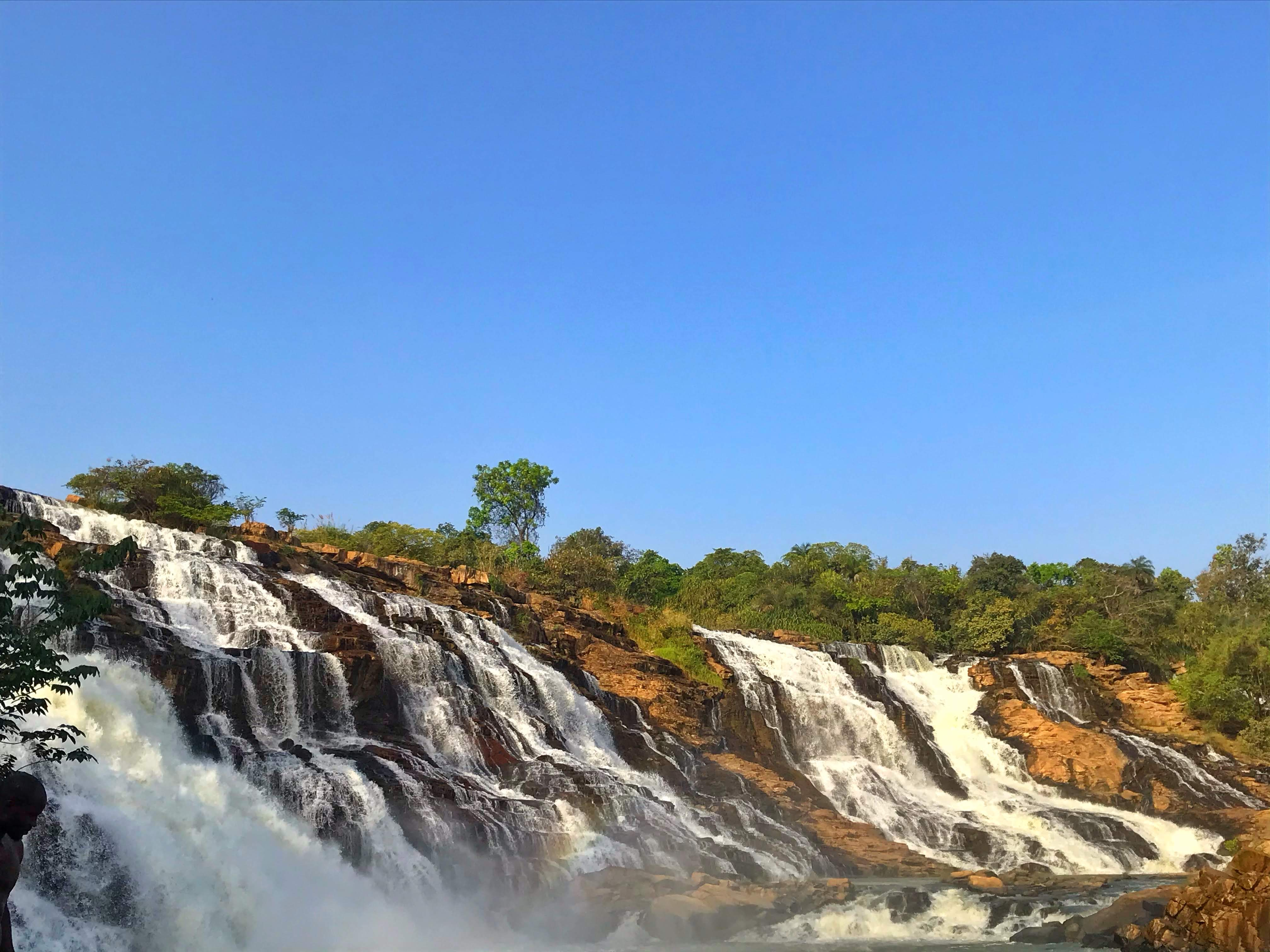
The Gurara Falls, Niger State, Nigeria

== See also ==
- List of waterfalls
