= Niandan =

Watercourse in Guinea

Coordinates: 9°10′35″N 10°04′24″W

The Niandan River is a tributary of the Niger River.

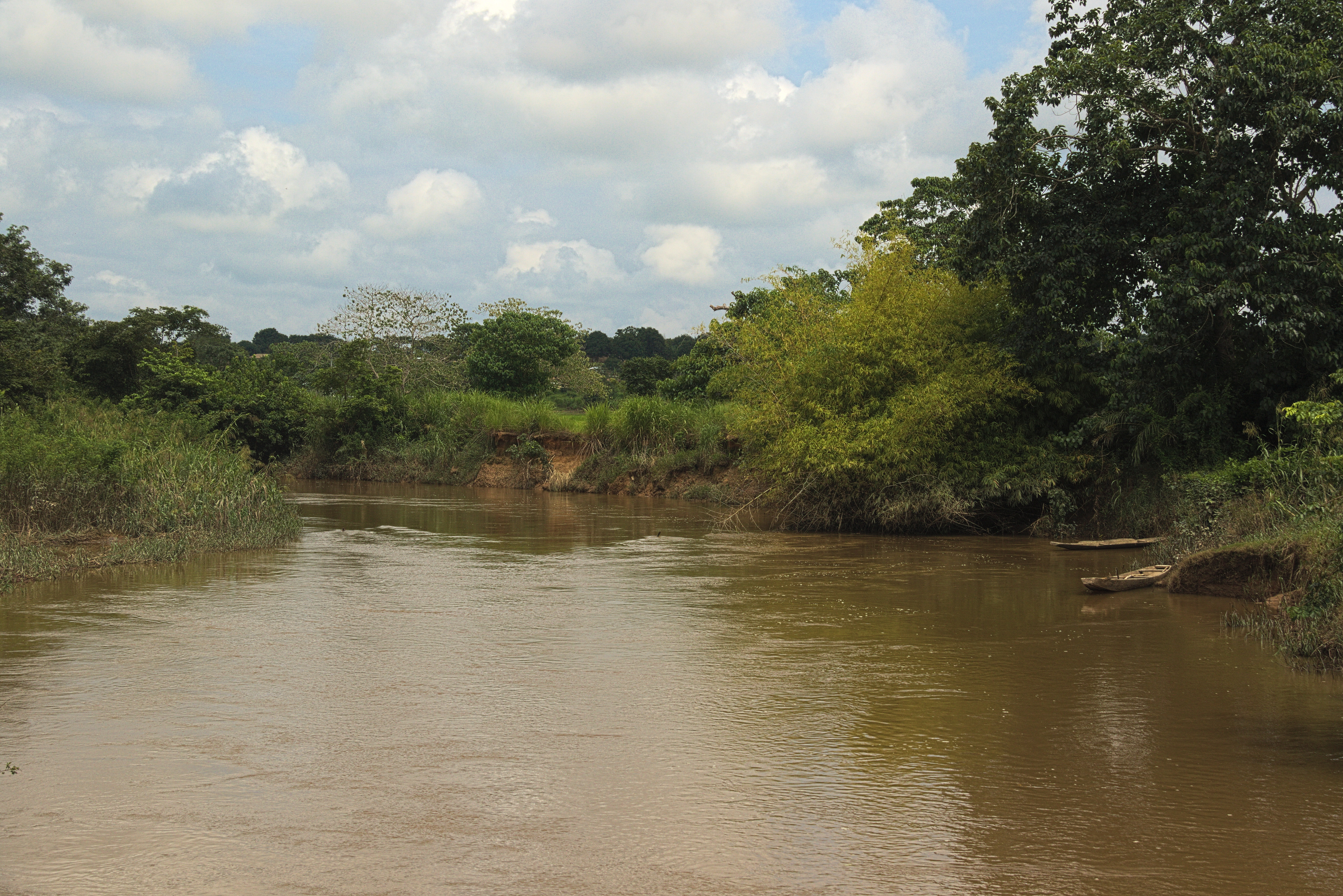
Niandan river near Kissidougou
