= Tembakounda =

River source in the Djallon Mountains, Guinea

Coordinates: 09°39′N 10°52′W

Tembakounda in Guinea is the location of the source of the Niger River, West Africa's longest river, which eventually empties at the Niger Delta into the Gulf of Guinea, 4,180 km (2,600 mi) distant. Tembakounda is in the Djallon Mountains, low mountains rising above the plateau area of the Guinea Highlands known as Fouta Djallon.
