= Suleja–Minna Road =

Road in Nigeria

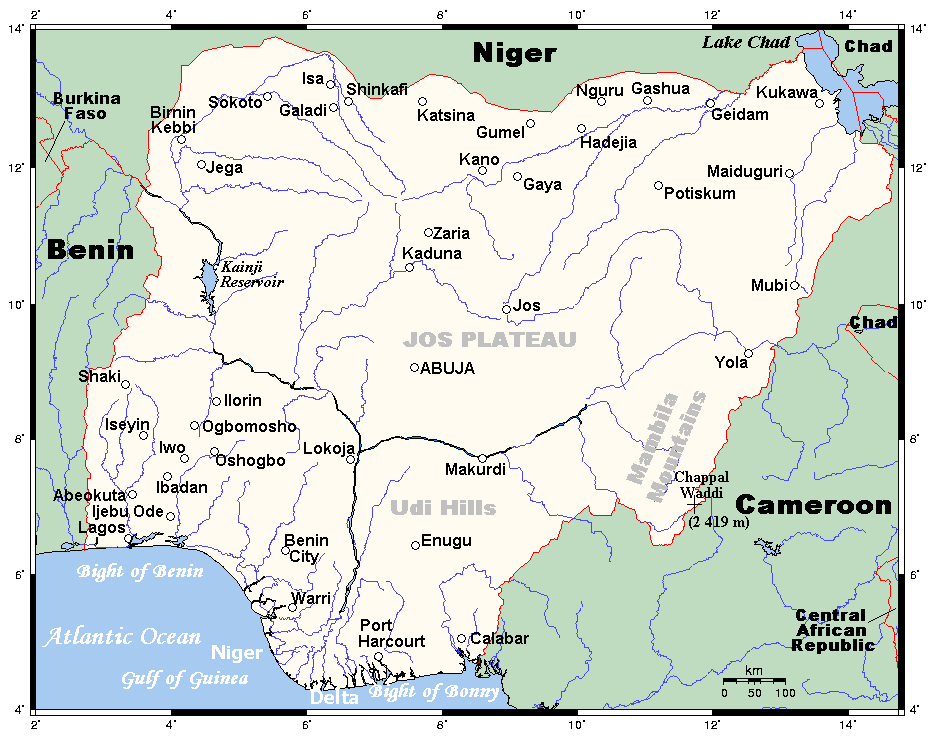

Route information
- Length: 40 km (25 mi)
- History: Reconstruction started in February 2010

Major junctions
- North end: Suleja
- West end: Minna

Location
- Country: Nigeria
- States: Niger State, Abuja

Highway system
- Transport in Nigeria

The Suleja–Minna Road is a 40 km carriageway connecting Abuja and Niger State. The road generally links the North-West part of Nigeria to Abuja. On 11 February 2015, the Federal Government of Nigeria under the Goodluck Jonathan administration kicked off the dualization of the Suleja-Minna road after several efforts by past administrations to redevelop it stalled.
