= Gurara, Nigeria =

Gurara
- LGA
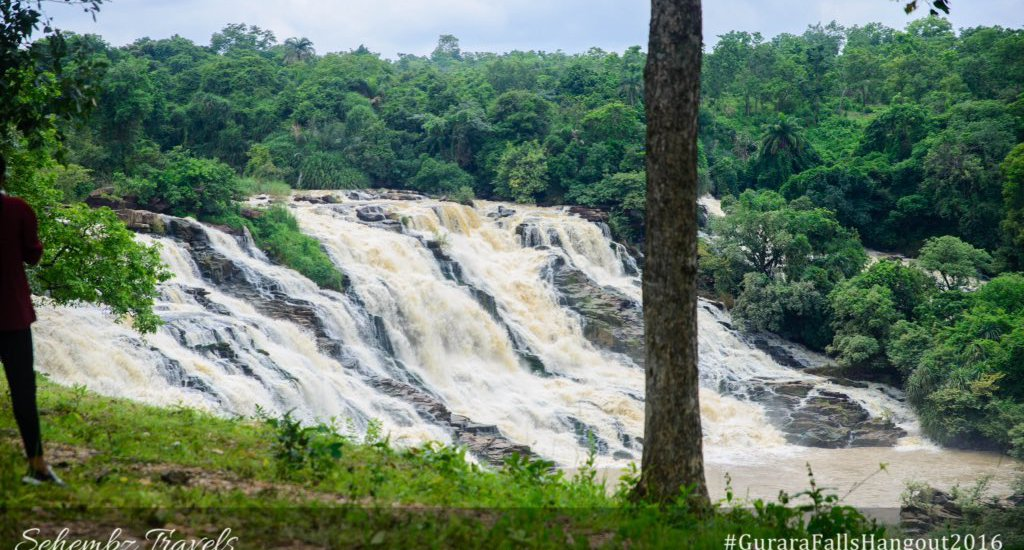
- View of Gurara waterfall
- Interactive map of Gurara
- Location in Nigeria
- Coordinates: 9°21′N 7°05′E
- Country: Nigeria
- State: Niger State
- Headquarter: Gawu

Government
  - Local Government Chairman and the Head of the Local Government Council: Adamu Gani

Area
  - Total: 954 km^{2} (368 sq mi)

Population (2006 census)
  - Total: 90,974
  - Density: 95.4/km^{2} (247/sq mi)
- Time zone: UTC+1 (WAT)
- 3-digit postal code prefix: 910
- ISO 3166 code: NG.NI.GU

Gurara is a Local Government Area in Niger State, Nigeria, adjoining the Federal Capital Territory. Its headquarters are in the town of Gawu. Major inhabitants are the Gwari people and Bassa people. The Gurara Waterfalls is found here.

It has an area of 954 km^{2} and a population of 90,974 at the 2006 census.

The postal code of the area is 910.

== Climate ==
Gurara experiences semi-arid weather. Trees don't grow here because of the drought, and the climate is warm to scorching all year. With grasses and occasionally bushes, it is primarily made of sand. Gurara experiences 20 °C (68 °F) average yearly temperatures and 1,930 mm (76 in) of annual precipitation. With an average humidity of 33% and a UV-index of 7, it is dry for 291 days out of the year.
