= Goroubi River =

Coordinates: 12°53′36.53″N 2°22′38.42″E

The Goroubi River is a right tributary of the Niger in western Africa. It rises in Burkina Faso and flows east, joining the Niger River in Niger.

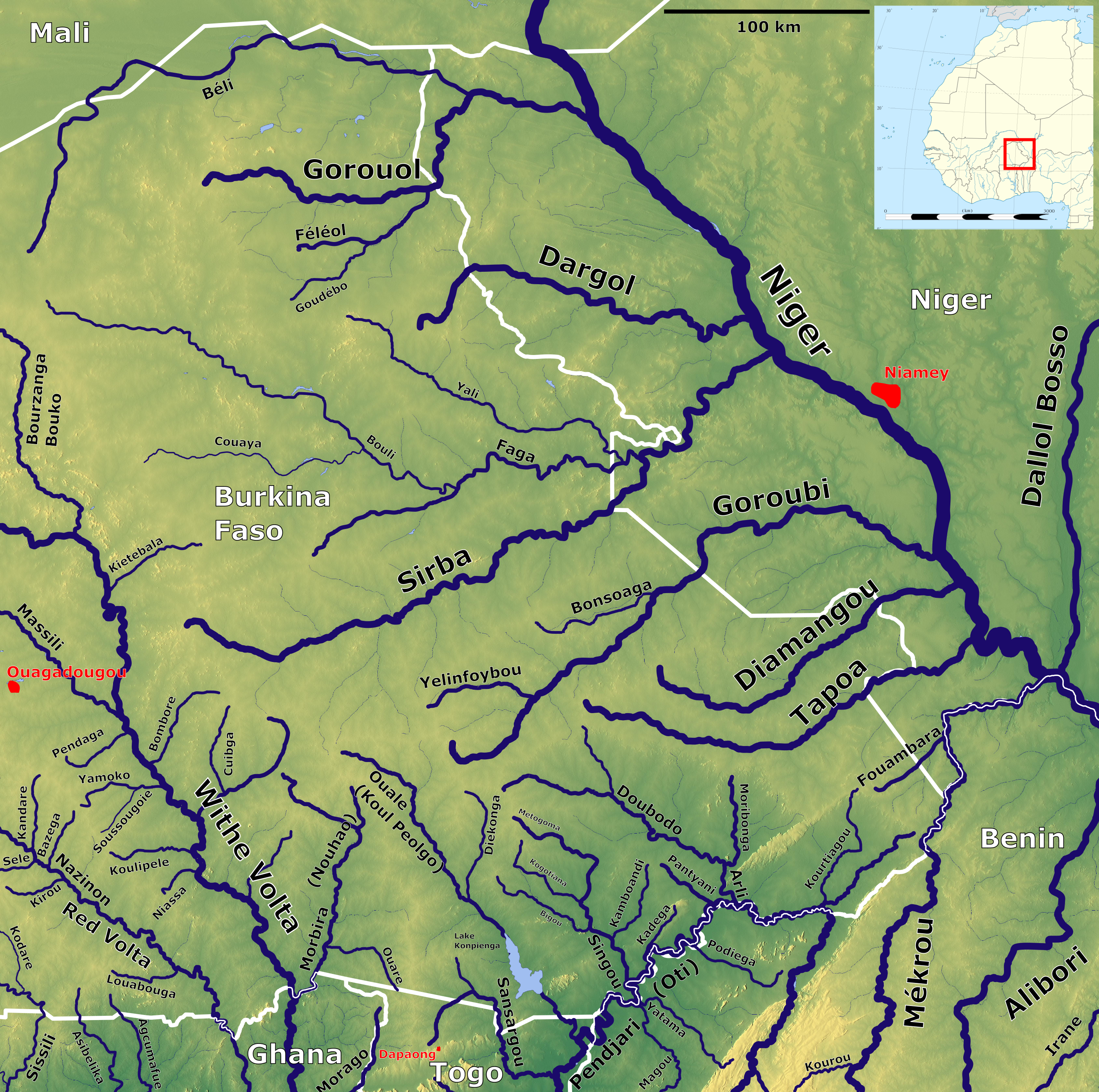

== Geography ==
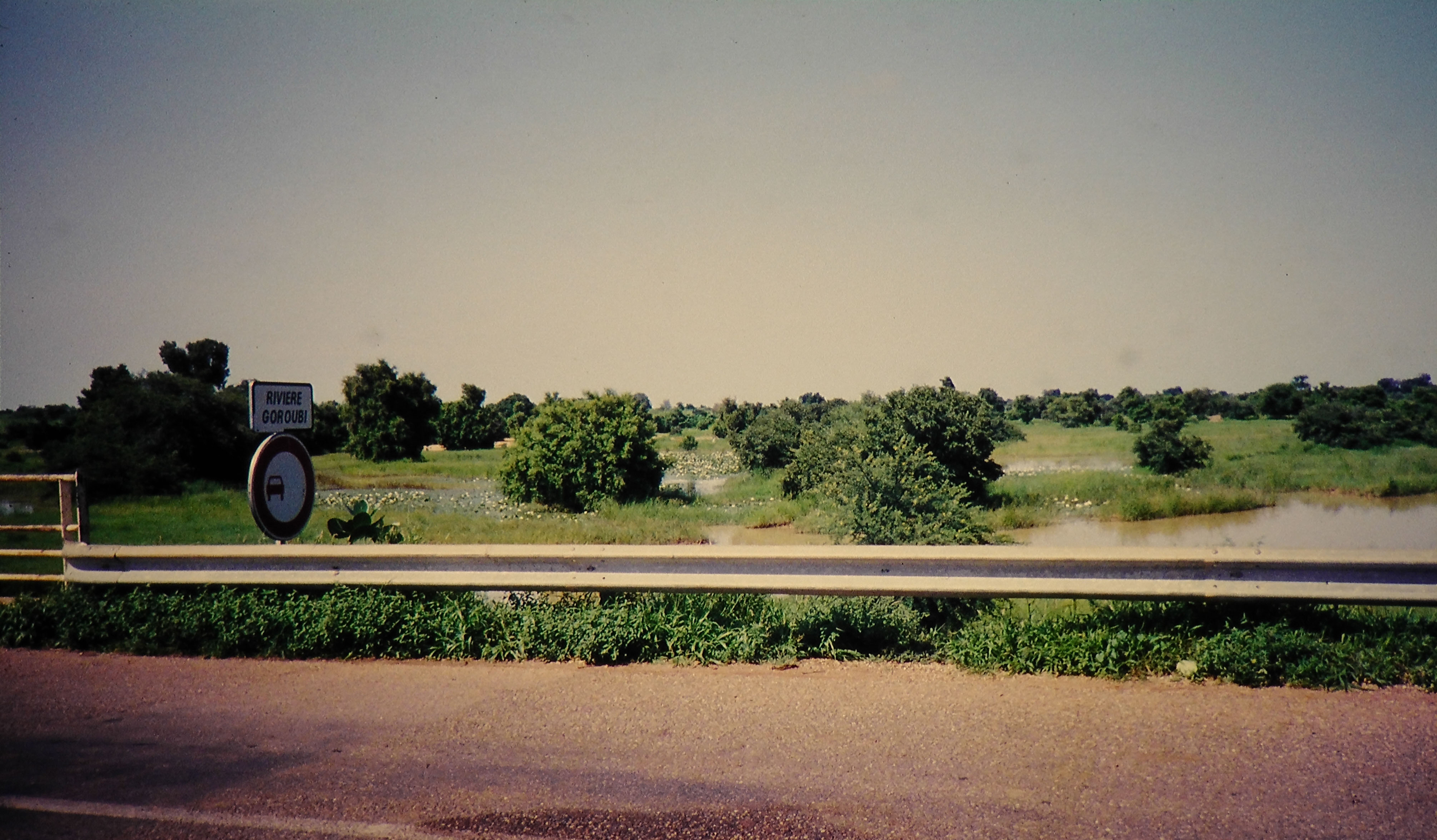
The Goroubi River in Niger

The Goroubi starts in Burkina Faso and flows north-east, then south east, it is joined by two rivers; the Digabari and the Tyenitiengal in Burkina Faso. It is a seasonal river that only flows during the rainy season.

The Goroubi joins the Niger 80 kilometers downstream south east of Niamey after the city of Say.
