= Mékrou River =

River in Benin, Burkina Faso and Niger

Coordinates: 12.4°N 2.81667°E

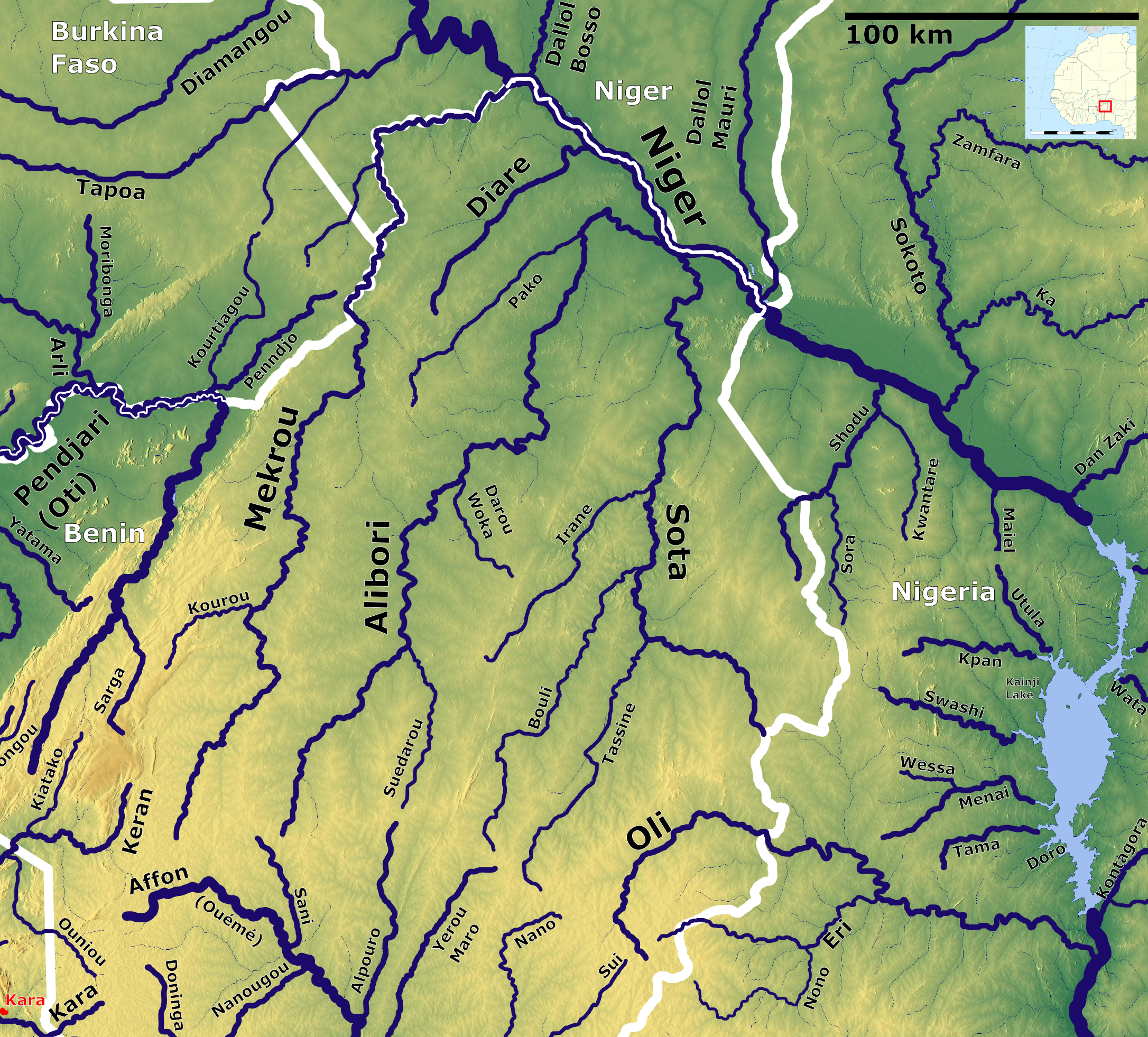

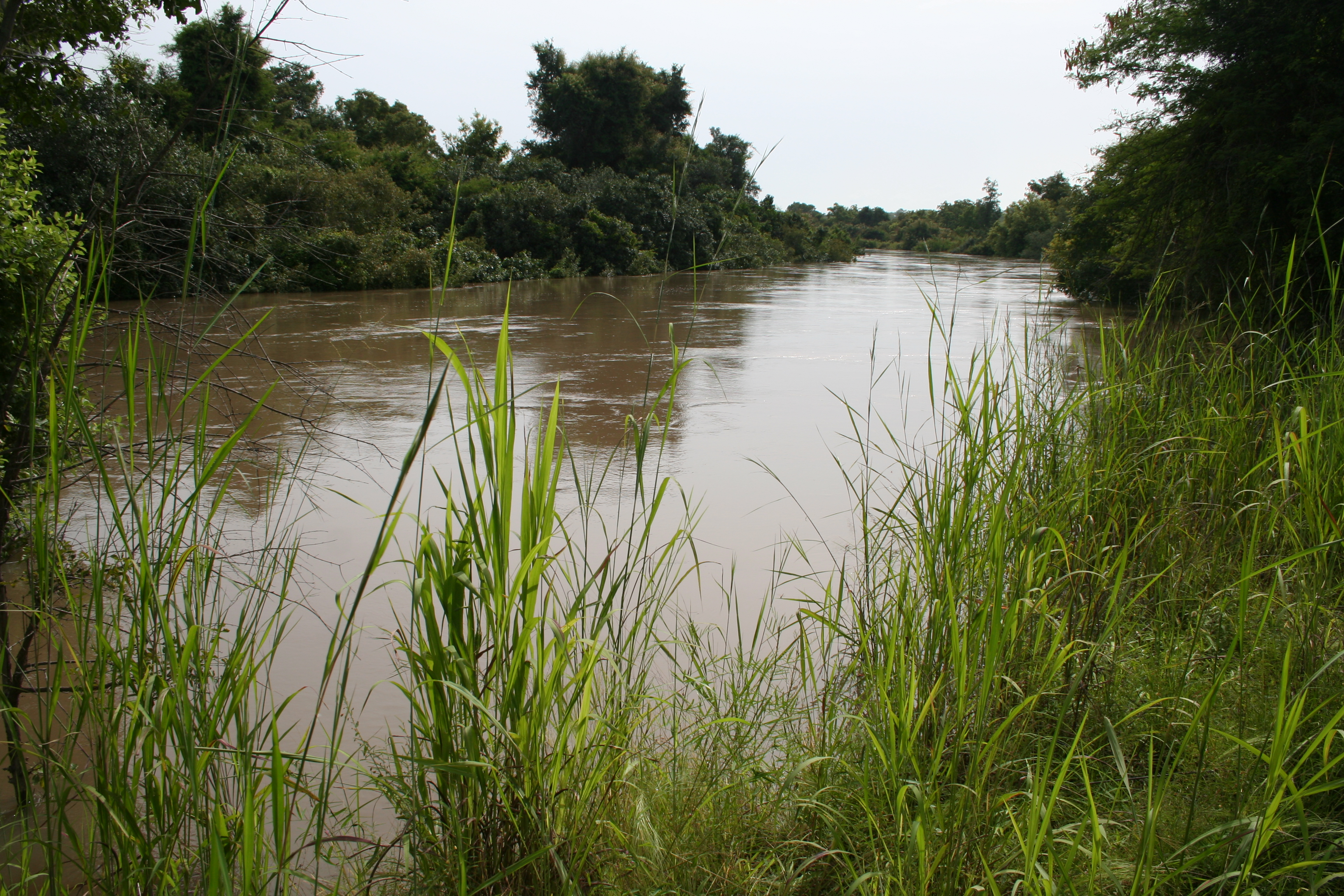
Mékrou River in the W-National Park

The Mékrou River is a river of Benin, Burkina Faso, and Niger. It flows through the W National Park.

A tributary of the Niger River, it begins in Benin north of Kouande and flows for 250 kilometers. It forms part of the border between Benin and Burkina Faso and between Benin and Niger. The proposed construction of the Dyondyonga electricity dam on the river has caused concern among environmentalists.
