= Sirba River =

River in Burkina Faso and Niger

Coordinates: 13°46′23″N 1°39′40″E

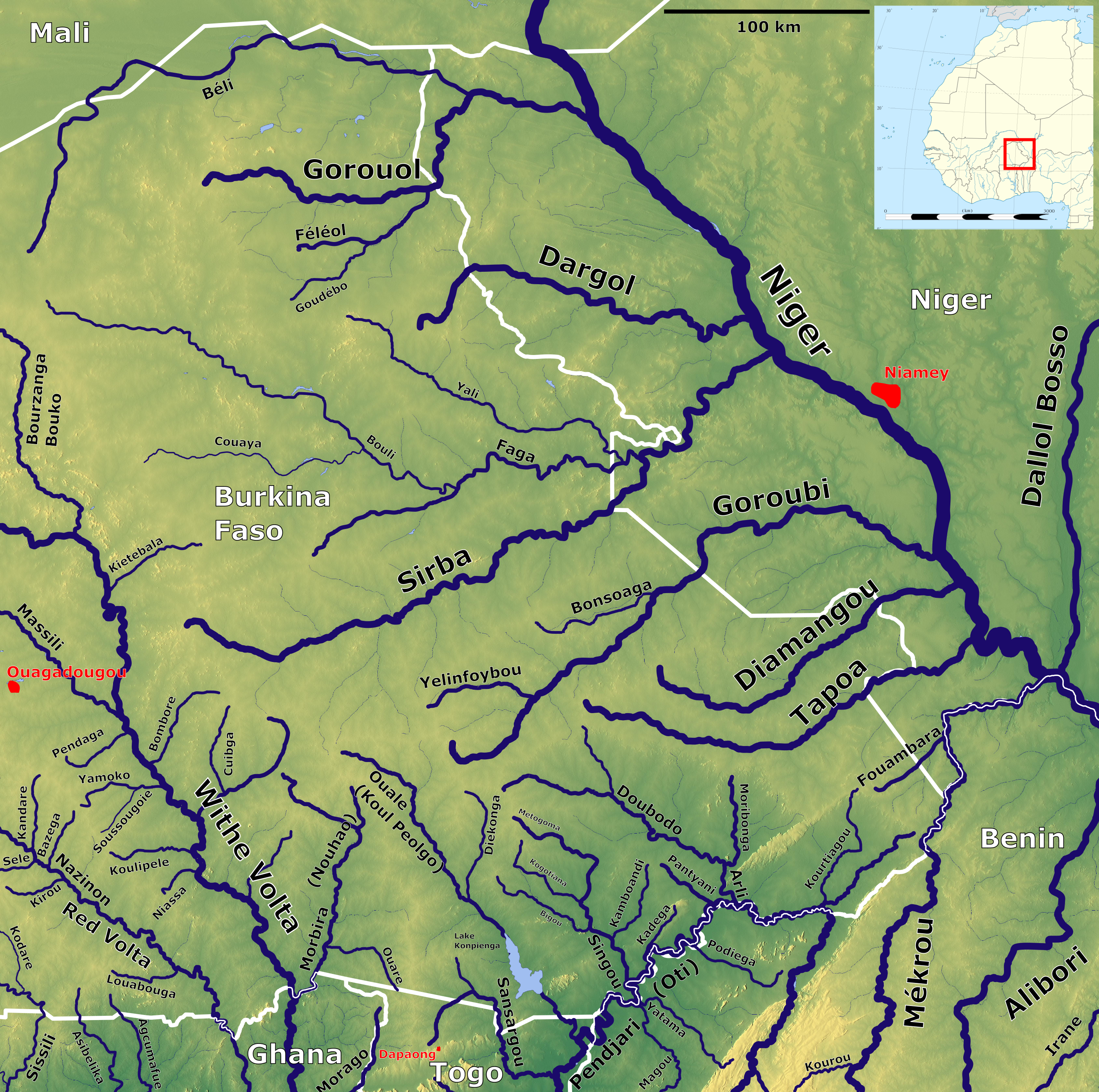

The Sirba River is a tributary of the Niger River in western Africa. The Sirba arises in Burkina Faso and flows east, crosses into Niger and then forms a short part of the international border between the two countries. It meets the Niger River at the midway point between the settlements of Gothèye and Karma in Niger, about 50 kilometres upstream from Niamey.

The river is subject to seasonal flooding.
