= Béli River =

River in Burkina Faso

Coordinates: 14°41′54″N 0°52′16″E

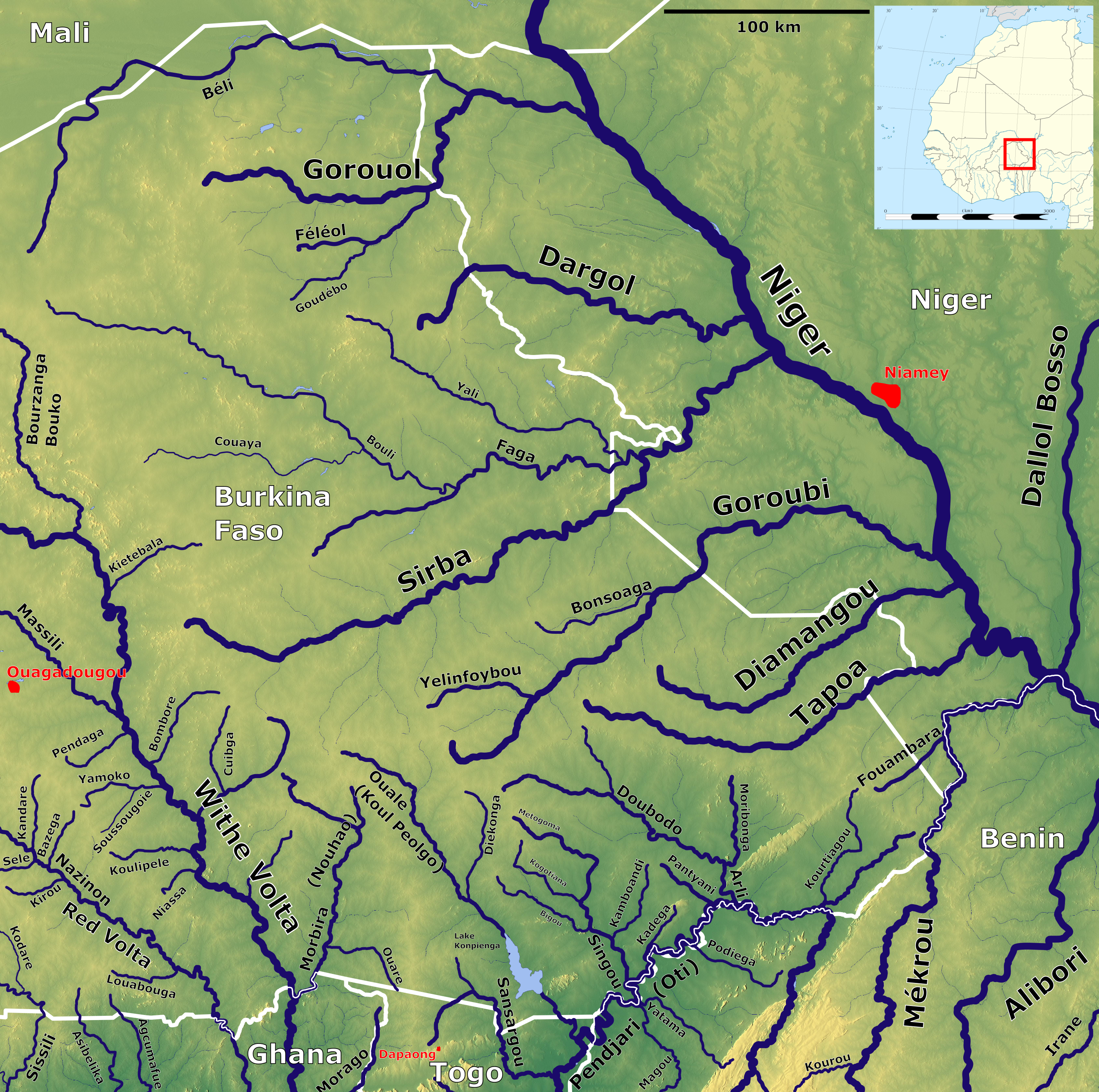

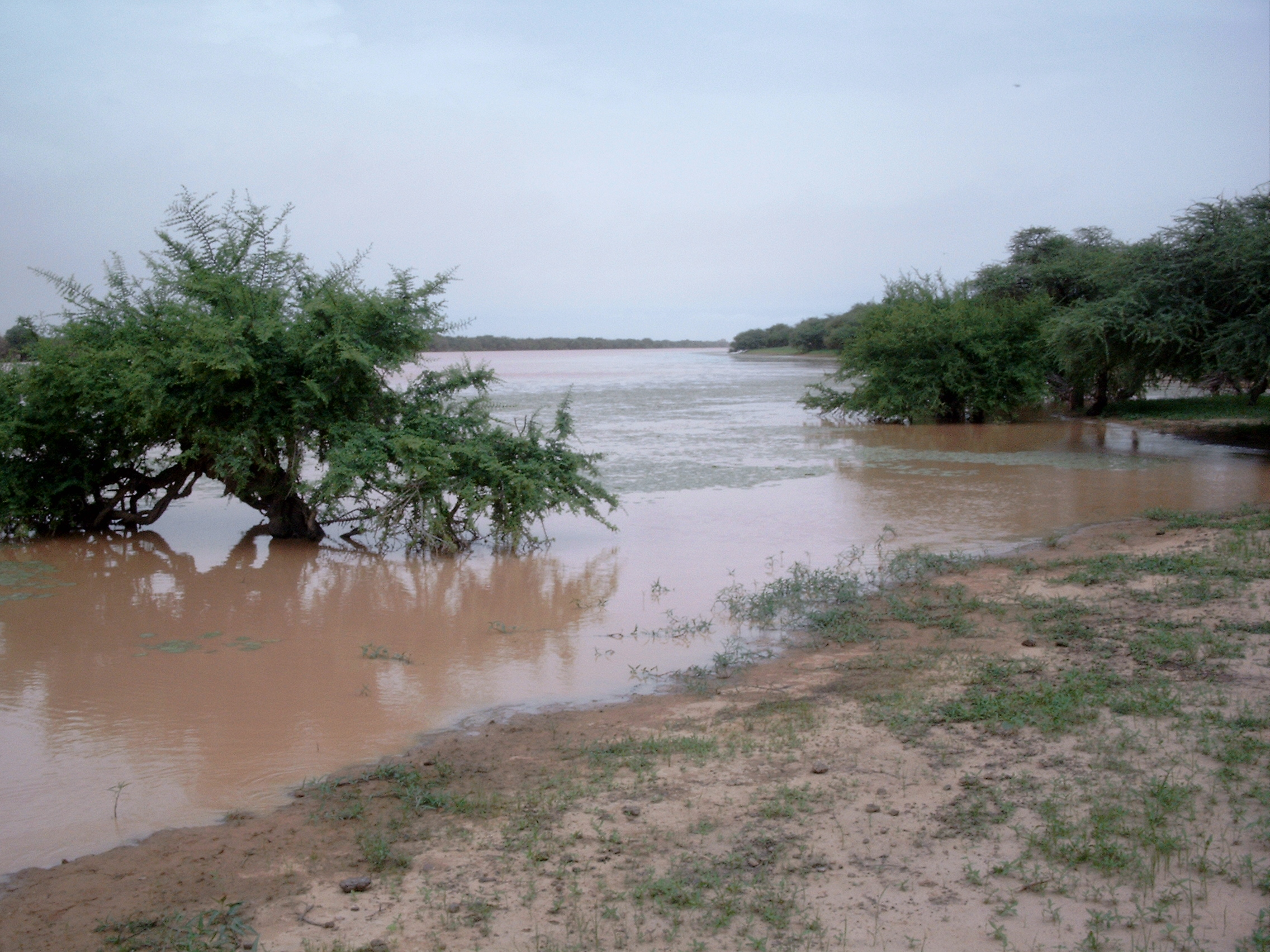

The Béli River or Gorouol is a seasonal river of northern Burkina Faso, just south of the Malian border. It is a western tributary of the Niger River, the confluence is near Ayourou.

BirdLife International has designated land around the Béli River as an important bird area with seven qualifying species.
