= List of rivers of Benin =

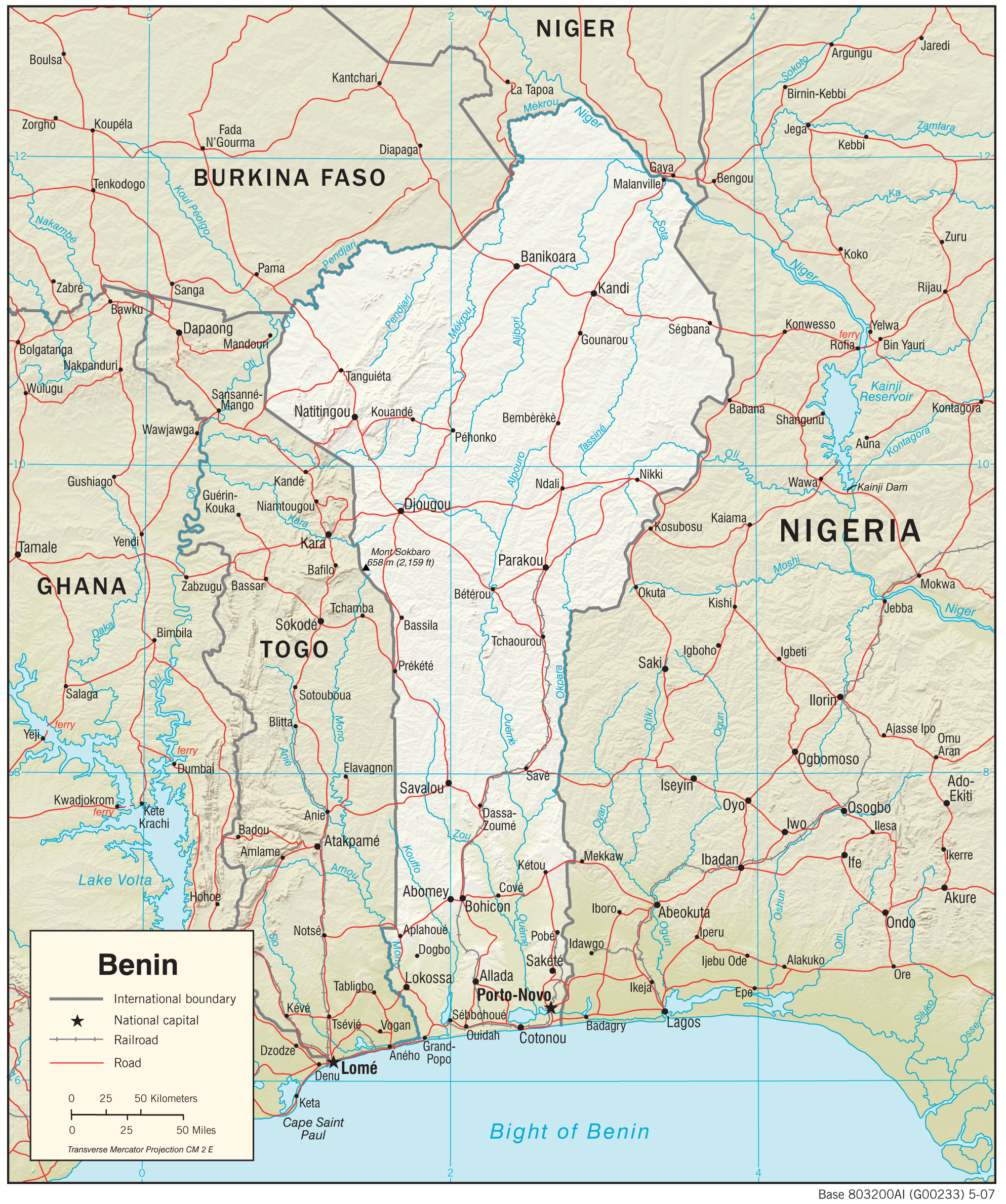
Map of Benin showing the main rivers and tributaries.

This is a list of rivers in Benin. This list is arranged west to east by drainage basin, with respective tributaries indented under each larger stream's name.

- Volta River (Ghana)
  - Oti River
    - Kara River
    - Pendjari River
- Mono River
  - Couffo River (Kouffo River)
- Ouémé River
  - Zou River
    - Agbado River
  - Okpara River
  - Alpouro River
- Niger River
  - Oli River
  - Sota River
    - Bouli River
    - Tassiné River
  - Alibori River
    - Pako River
  - Mékrou River
