= Mokole language (Benin) =

Yoruboid language spoken in Benin

Mokole
- Èdè Mɔ̄kɔ́lé
- Native to: Benin
- Region: Kandi
- Native speakers: 36,000 (2018)
- Language family: Niger–Congo?: Atlantic–Congo; Volta–Niger; yeai; Yoruboid; Edekiri; Mokole
- Writing system: Latin

Official status
- Recognised minority language in: Benin

Language codes
- ISO 639-3: mkl
- Glottolog: moko1243

Mokole (or Mokollé, Mokwale, Monkole, Féri) is a Yoruboid language spoken in the villages surrounding the town of Kandi in northern Benin. Its speakers constitute a sub-group of Yoruba originated people that are closely associated with the Bariba people of Benin.

They represent the northernmost group of Yoruba speaking people in West Africa and are an 'island' completely surrounded by the Bariba. Their dialect is most closely related to that of the Shabe lect of Yoruba even though the closest Shabe speaking villages of Alafia and Tchaourou are situated more than 270kms south.

== History ==
The Mokole people established themselves in northern Benin on the land strip between Kandi and Malanville in the current-day department of Alibori from the Oyo Empire of Yorubaland to the south around the sixteenth century.

== Locations ==
The following towns and villages are attested to have been founded by the Mokole speaking people.

- Angaradébou
- Iya
- Kandi
- Tui
- Saah
- Pede (Kpede)
- Guénè
- Lolo (Loro)
- Bensekou
