= Alibori River =

River in Benin

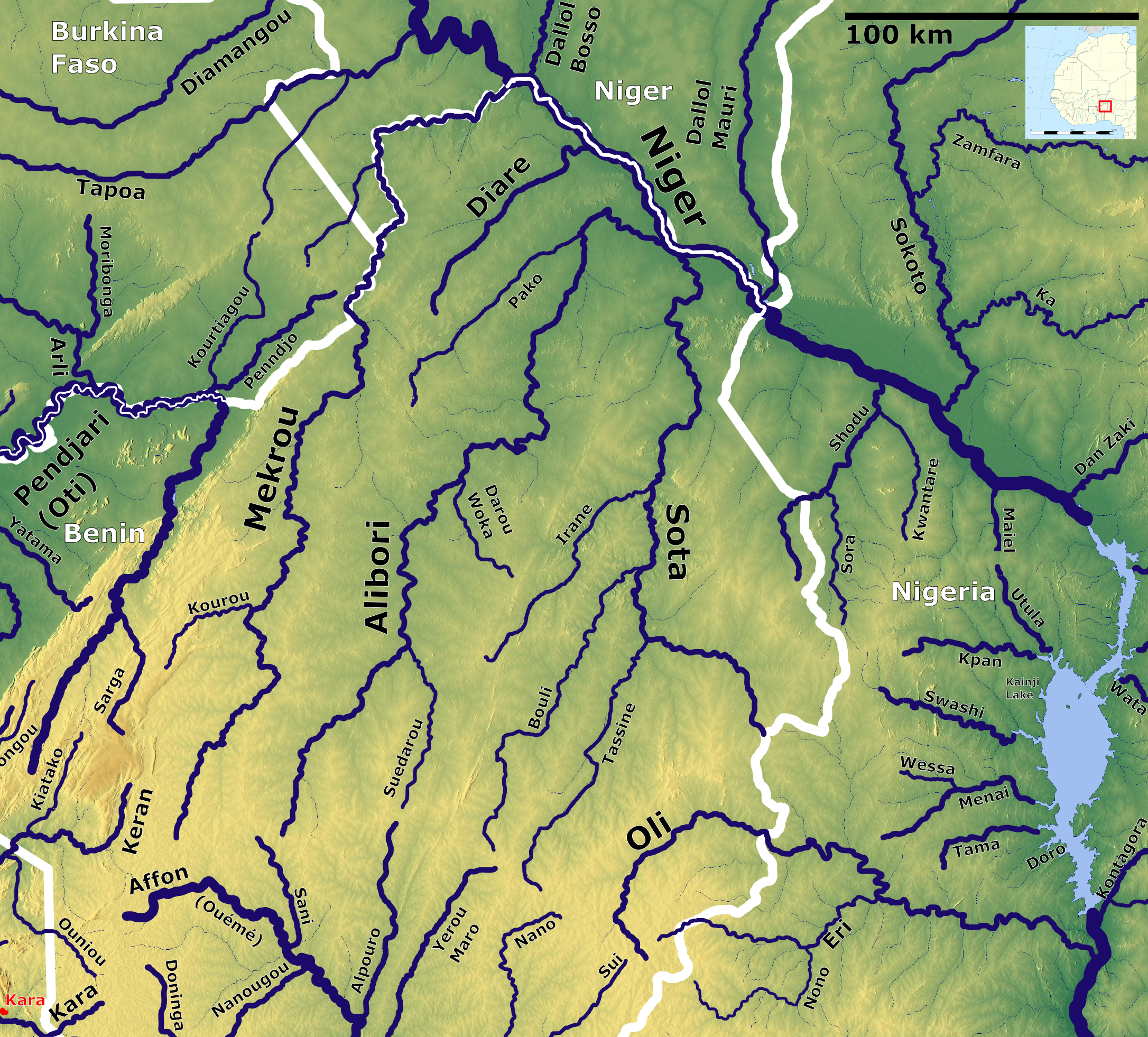
- North Benin with the Alibori in the Center

- Location of mouth in Benin

Location
- Country: Benin

Physical characteristics
- Mouth
  - coordinates: 11.933°N 3.291°E

Basin features
- River system: Niger River

The Alibori River is a river in the northeastern part of Benin. It rises near the village of Tobré in Atakora Department and flows northeast, ultimately emptying into the Niger River near Birni-Lafia. In Alibori Department it forms the eastern border of the communes of Banikoara and Karimama, as well the eastern boundary of W Transborder Park. The Pako River is one of its tributaries. It is populated with crocodiles.
