= Benin–Nigeria border =

International border

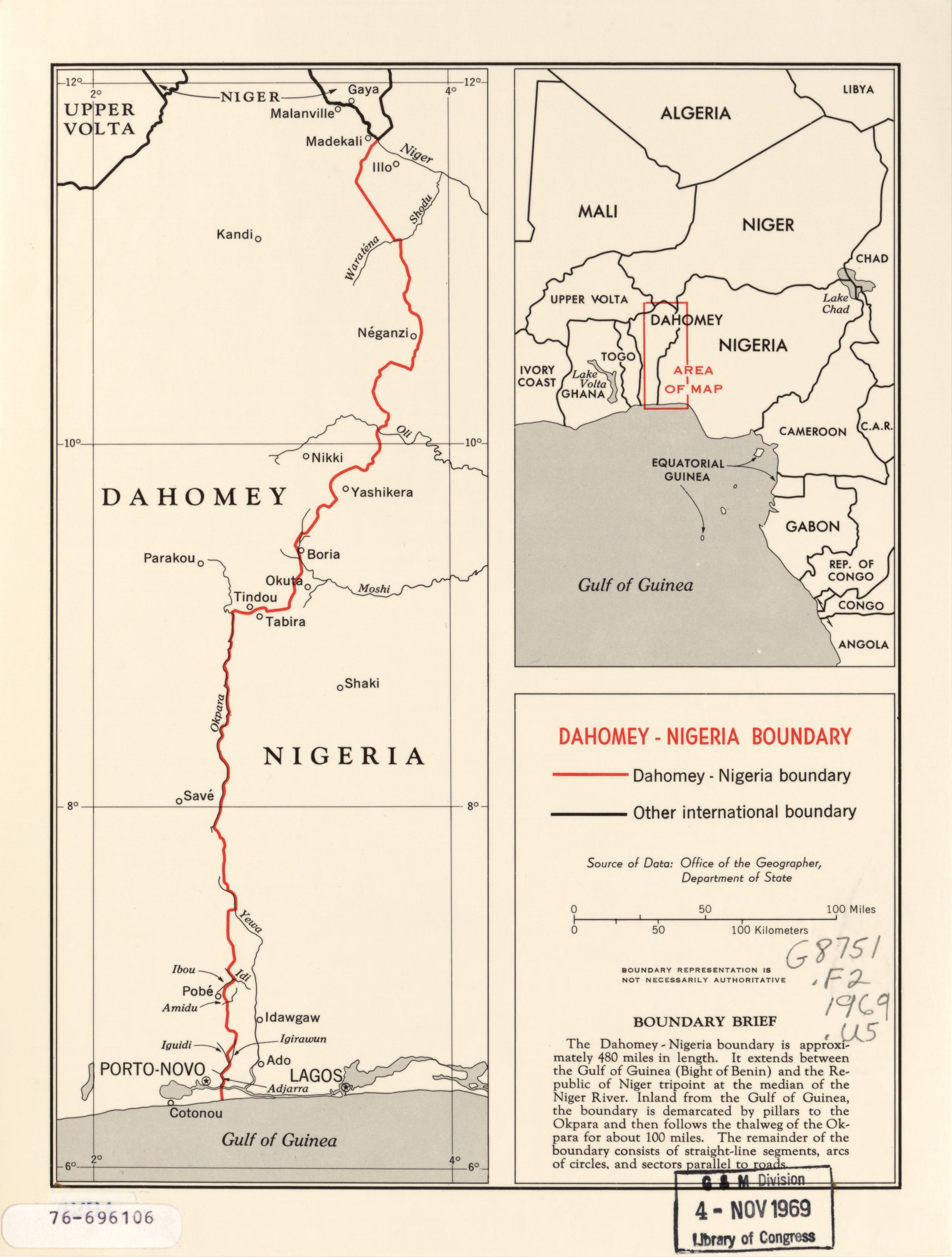
Map of the Benin-Nigeria border

The Benin–Nigeria border is 809 km (503 mi) in length and runs from the tripoint with Niger in the north down to the Bight of Benin in the south.

== Description ==
The border starts in the north at the tripoint with Niger in the Niger River and then proceeds in a roughly south-to-southwesterly direction overland, before reaching the Okpara River just east of Waria. The border then proceeds to the south, utilising the Okpara for circa 100 miles, various small streams, and several overland sections, before terminating at the Bight of Benin.

== History ==
During the second half of the 19th century France began creating small trading settlements on the West African coast. In 1851 a treaty of friendship was signed between France and the Kingdom of Dahomey in what is now southern Benin, followed by the creation of a protectorate in Porto Novo in 1863. The colony of Dahomey (the former name of Benin) was declared in 1894 and was later included within the much larger federal colony of French West Africa (Afrique occidentale française, abbreviated AOF) in 1899. Meanwhile, Britain had (via the Royal Niger Company) administered the area around Lagos since 1861 and the Oil River Protectorate (Calabar are the surrounding area) since 1884. As Britain expanded into the interior, two colonies were created - the Southern Nigeria Protectorate and the Northern Nigeria Protectorate. In 1900 the administration of these areas was transferred to the British government, with the Northern and Southern (including Lagos and Calabar) protectorates united as the colony of Nigeria in 1914.

A rough delimitation between the two territories as far north as the 9th parallel had been negotiated on 10 August 1889; this was further clarified in more detail via an agreement of 12 October 1896. An Anglo-French treaty of 14 June 1898 confirmed this border, and extended it northwards up to the river Niger. This border was confirmed by a treaty of 19 October 1906, with some minor changes made in 1912 following on-the-ground demarcation which were later finalised officially via an exchange of notes in 1914. The section between the Atlantic and the Okpara river was marked on the ground by 142 concrete beacons, the boundary being formed by a straight line between them.

As the movement for decolonisation grew in the post-Second World War era, Britain and France gradually granted more political rights and representation for their African colonies. Dahomey declared full independence on 1 August 1960, followed by Nigeria on 1 October 1960, and their mutual frontier became an international one between two states.

By 2004-05 many of the boundary markers from the original demarcation were missing, prompting Benin and Nigeria to re-demarcate some sections of the border.

== Settlements near the border ==
=== Benin ===
- Mandécali
- Segbana
- Néganzi
- Basso
- Waria
- Adékambi
- Pobè
- Porto-Novo

=== Nigeria ===
- Bani
- Samia
- Swate
- Babana
- Yashikera
- Suya
- Orieke
