= Orou Gnonrou =

- Village
- Country: Benin
- Department: Alibori Department
- Commune: Banikoara
- Arrondissement: Banikoara
- Time zone: UTC+1 (WAT)

Orou Gnonrou is a village in the commune of Banikoara in the Alibori Department of northern Benin.
