= Agbado River =

River in Benin

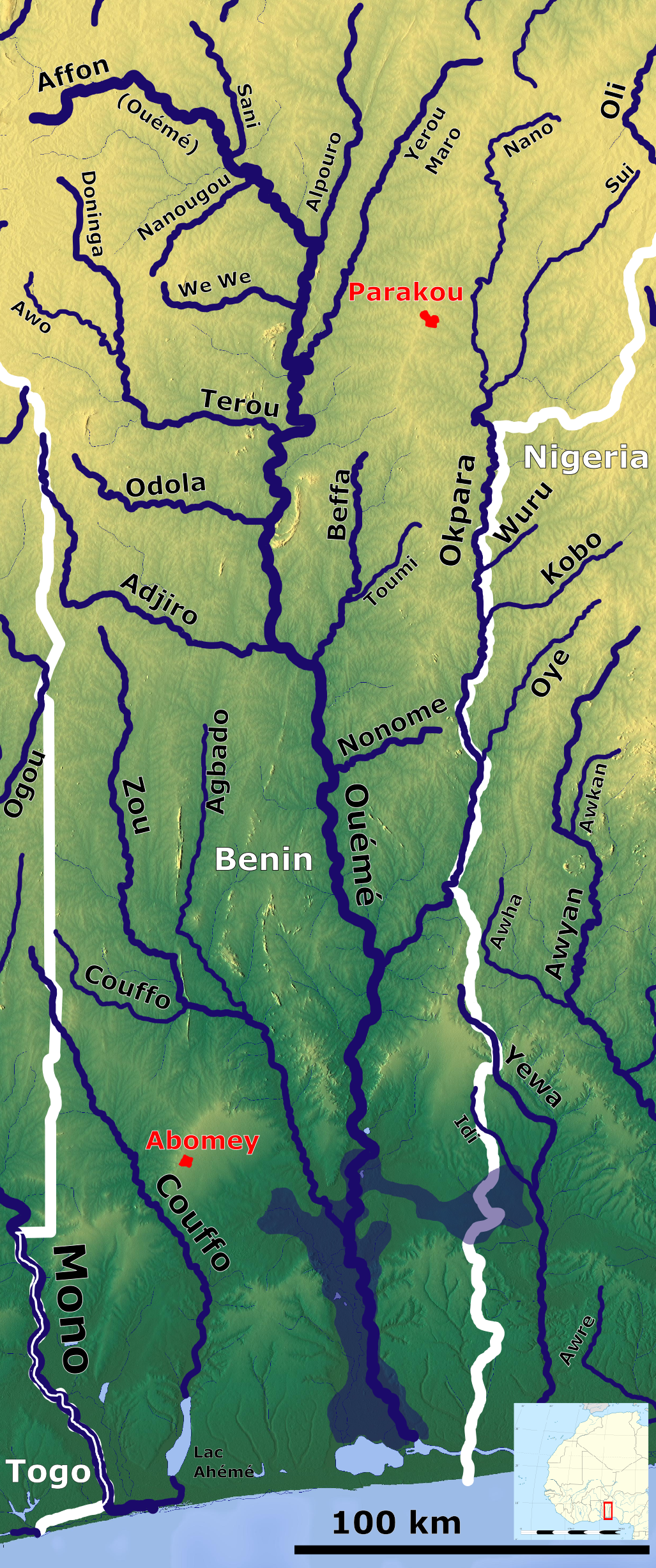
- Ouémé River system with the Zou and the Agbado river (south west)

- Location of mouth

Location
- Country: Benin

Physical characteristics
- Mouth
  - coordinates: 7.565°N 2.129°E

The Agbado River is a river of Benin. It flows through Maxi territory to the north of Abomey. It flows south from its source in northern Collines Department, passes the town of Savalou, and discharges into the Zou River at the Atchérigbé Classified Forest near Setto.

== Overview ==
The Agbado River is a river in central Benin and a tributary of the Zou River, one of the two principal tributaries of the Ouémé River, the country's largest river system. The river rises in the northern part of the Collines Department, flows generally southward through the vicinity of Savalou, and joins the Zou River within the Atchérigbé Classified Forest near Setto. As part of the Ouémé drainage basin, the Agbado contributes to one of the most important hydrological systems in Benin, supplying water for agriculture, rural communities, and downstream ecosystems. The Agbado River is also shown as a tributary of the Zou River in modern cartographic representations of the Ouémé basin.

== Geography ==
The Agbado River drains part of the crystalline basement plateau of central Benin. From its headwaters in the Collines Department, it flows through a landscape characterized by wooded savanna, agricultural land, and gallery forests before reaching the Zou River. The basin lies within the wider Ouémé watershed, which extends across much of central and southern Benin and ultimately discharges into the Gulf of Guinea through the Ouémé Delta.

== Hydrology ==
The hydrological regime of the Agbado River reflects the tropical climatic conditions of central Benin. Streamflow is highly seasonal, with discharge increasing during the rainy season and declining substantially during the dry season. Because the river forms part of the Zou–Ouémé system, its flow contributes to the seasonal flood dynamics that characterize the Ouémé Basin.

Hydrological studies of the Ouémé Basin indicate that river discharge is controlled primarily by seasonal rainfall, catchment geology, soil properties, and land cover. Although no long-term gauging station is known for the Agbado River itself, its behaviour is consistent with that of neighbouring tributaries of the Zou River, which experience marked wet-season flooding followed by prolonged low-flow conditions.

== Environment ==
The Agbado River flows through a transition zone between Sudanian and Guinean vegetation types. Riparian forests along its banks provide habitat for aquatic organisms, birds, amphibians, and small mammals while helping stabilize riverbanks and reduce soil erosion. The river also transports sediments and nutrients into the Zou River, thereby contributing to the ecological functioning of the wider Ouémé Basin.

== Human use ==
The Agbado River is used by nearby rural communities for domestic water supply, artisanal fishing, livestock watering, and small-scale agriculture. During the rainy season, floodwaters replenish floodplain soils that support crop production, while in the dry season the river remains an important local water resource. Agricultural activities within the catchment are dominated by food crops and, in some areas, cotton cultivation.

== Environmental issues ==
Like many tributaries of the Ouémé Basin, the Agbado River is potentially affected by soil erosion, agricultural runoff, and diffuse pollution associated with fertilizer and pesticide use. Basin-wide monitoring programmes have documented pesticide residues and seasonal variations in water quality within the Ouémé watershed, highlighting the importance of integrated watershed management and continued environmental monitoring.

== Scientific importance ==
Although the Agbado River has received relatively little individual scientific attention, it forms part of the extensively studied Ouémé River Basin, which has served as a reference catchment for research on tropical hydrology, climate variability, flood forecasting, water quality, land-use change, and integrated water resources management in West Africa.

== See also ==
- Zou River
- Ouémé River
- List of rivers of Benin
