= Ouémé =

Ouémé may refer to:

- Ouémé Department, one of the twelve departments of Benin
- Ouémé River, a river in the countries of Benin and Nigeria
