= Founougo =

- Arrondissement and town
- Location in Benin
- Coordinates: 11°28′51″N 2°31′56″E
- Country: Benin
- Department: Alibori Department
- Commune: Banikoara

Population (2002)
  - Total: 30,527
- Time zone: UTC+1 (WAT)

Founougo is a town and arrondissement in the Alibori Department of northeastern Benin. It is an administrative division under the jurisdiction of the commune of Banikoara. According to the population census conducted by the Institut National de la Statistique Benin on February 15, 2002, the arrondissement had a total population of 30,527. Founougo lies on the savanna plateau with climate and vegetation typical of Benin's transitional agricultural zones. The economy is predominantly agricultural.

== Geography ==
Founougo is a town and arrondissement in the Alibori Department of northeastern Benin. It is an administrative division under the jurisdiction of the commune of Banikoara. It lies on the savanna plateau and experiences a tropical, wet savannah climate.

== Demographics ==
The arrondissement had a total population of 30,527 inhabitants. As a part of broader Banikoara region, most of the commune area is arable, and agriculture and livestock are the primary livelihood sources. Crops grown include cotton, maize, sorghum, and cowpeas. Borgou cattle from Founougo form a central part of the local farming system, animal grazing corridors have been established along Gomparou–Founougo–Kandèrou for rearing of the cattle.

== Infrastructure ==
A bridge over the Founougo dam was inaugurated in May 2019 to improve connectivity and resilience to floods in the region. A stadium was opened in February 2020 to provide sports facilities. A health center was opened August 2020, equipped with maternity and inpatient wards. In August 2024, solar power units were installed to augment power generation capacity.
