= Kandi Airport =

Airport in Alibori, Benin

- IATA: KDC; ICAO: DBBK

Summary
- Airport type: Public
- Serves: Kandi
- Location: Benin
- Elevation AMSL: 958 ft / 292 m
- Coordinates: 11°8′42.2″N 2°56′25.6″E

Map
- Location of Kandi Airport in Benin

Runways
Direction	Length		Surface
Direction	m	ft	Surface
07/25	1,372	4,500	DIRT
- Source: Landings.com

Kandi Airport (IATA: KDC, ICAO: DBBK) is a public use airport located near Kandi, Alibori, Benin.
