= Analcime =

Zeolite mineral

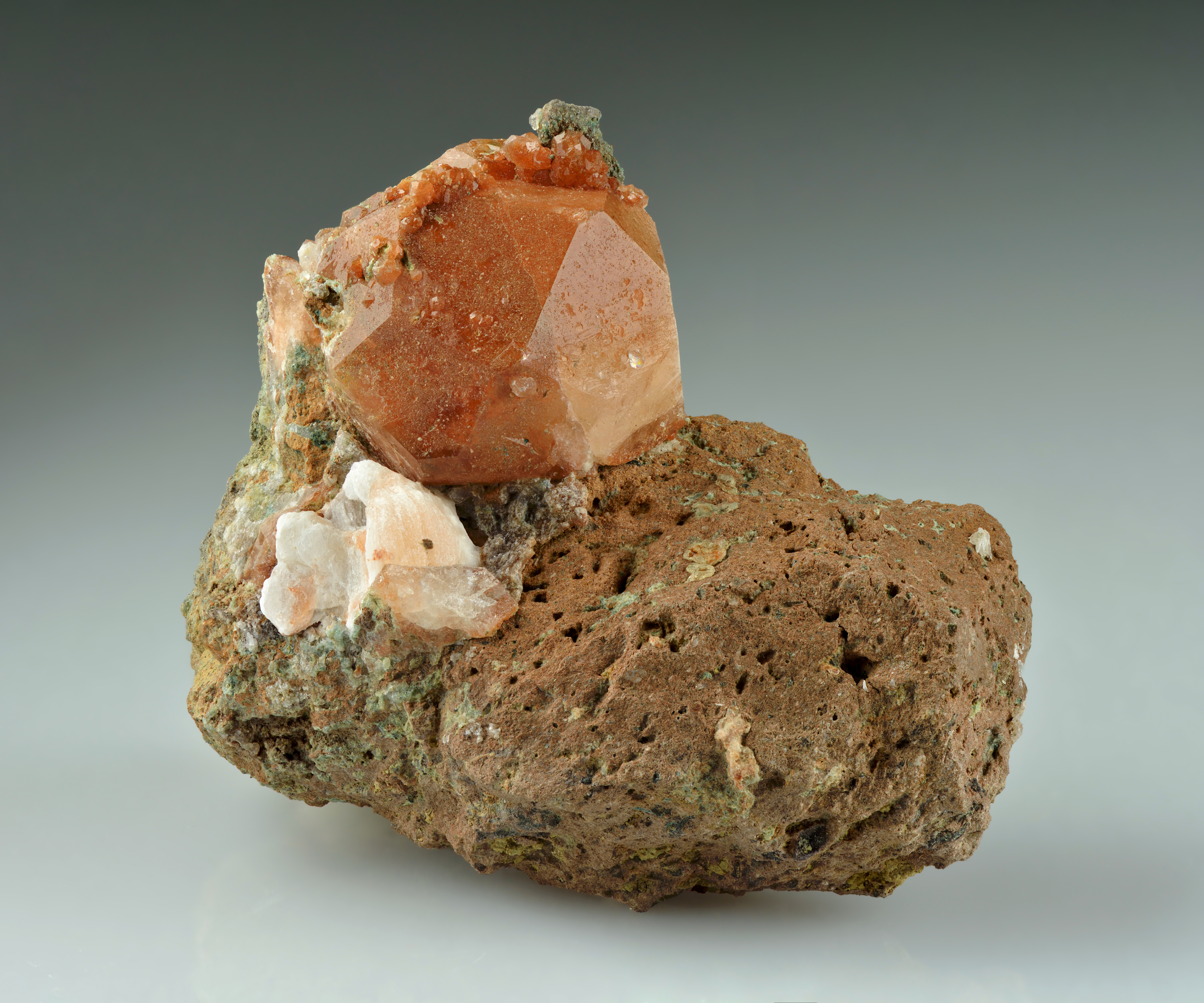
- Reddish crystals of analcime up to 1.8 cm in size on matrix

General
- Category: Tectosilicate minerals
- Group: Zeolite group
- Formula: NaAlSi_{2}O_{6} · H_{2}O
- IMA symbol: Anl
- Strunz classification: 9.GB.05
- Crystal system: Orthorhombic
- Crystal class: Dipyramidal (mmm); H-M symbol: (2/m 2/m 2/m)
- Space group: Ibca

Identification
- Formula mass: 220.15
- Color: White, colorless, gray, pink, greenish, yellowish
- Crystal habit: Typically in crystals, usually trapezohedrons, also massive to granular.
- Twinning: Polysynthetic on [001], [110]
- Cleavage: Indistinct on {001}, {010}, {100}
- Fracture: Uneven to subconchoidal
- Mohs scale hardness: 5–5.5
- Luster: Vitreous
- Streak: White
- Diaphaneity: Transparent to subtransparent to translucent
- Specific gravity: 2.24–2.29
- Optical properties: Isotropic; anomalously biaxial (−)
- Refractive index: n = 1.479–1.493
- Pleochroism: None
- Ultraviolet fluorescence: Short UV = Greenish blueish white Long UV = Green, creamy white-yellow
- Fusibility: 3.5
- Other characteristics: Weakly piezoelectric and pyroelectric; weakly electrostatic when rubbed or heated

Analcime (/əˈnælsiːm, -saɪm/; from Ancient Greek ἀνάλκιμος (análkimos) 'not strong') or analcite is a white, gray, or colorless tectosilicate mineral. Analcime consists of hydrated sodium aluminium silicate in cubic crystalline form. Its chemical formula is NaAlSi_{2}O_{6} · H_{2}O. Minor amounts of potassium and calcium substitute for sodium. A silver-bearing synthetic variety also exists (Ag-analcite).

Analcime is usually classified as a zeolite mineral, but structurally and chemically it is more similar to the feldspathoids. Analcime is not classified as an isometric crystal, as although the crystal structure appears to be isometric, it is usually off only by a fraction of an angle. However, there are truly isometric samples of the mineral, which makes its classification even more difficult. Due to the differences between the samples being too slight, there's no merit from having multiple species names, so as a result analcime is a common example for minerals occurring in multiple crystal systems and space groups.

It was first described by French geologist Déodat de Dolomieu, who called it zéolithe dure, meaning hard zeolite. It was found in lava in Cyclops, Italy. The mineral is IMA approved, and had been grandfathered, meaning the name analcime is believed to refer to a valid species til this day.

== Properties ==
Analcime crystals always look pseudocubic. Its common crystal forms include trapezohedron, truncated trapezohedron with cubic faces, and more rarely either as a truncated trapezohedron, or the crystals can take the shape of a truncated cube that is typical to bixbyites. The crystals can occur either individually, as interconnected, form groups on plates or even in druzy form. Crystal masses can also form veins sometimes. Individual crystals are euhedral, meaning they have well defined faces. When on a matrix, the mineral takes a granular habit, meaning the crystals become anhedral. The color of the mineral varies due to trace impurities. The mineral is weakly piezoelectric and pyroelectric, meaning it produces a weak electric charge when it's rubbed or heated, hence the name analcime. Other characteristics include the fact that the mineral can have a blueish white fluorescence when inspected under short UV light, and a creamy white-yellow one inspected under long UV light. It does not show any pleochroic or radioactive properties. Analyses regarding the mineral's symmetry vary in results, however the most prevalent one being tetragonal. The mineral usually has polysynthetic twins, which are only visible in thin sections when the specimen is inspected under polarized analyzed light. Analcime mainly consists of oxygen (50.87%), silicon (25.51%), aluminum (12.26%), sodium (10.44%) but otherwise has a negligible amount of hydrogen (0.92%) as well. The highest quality specimens take the form of a trapezohedron, and can reach up to 25 cm. These specimens are associated with serandite, aegyrine and natrolite, and can be found at Mont Saint-Hilaire, Quebec. Of the pinkish-white specimens, the mineral takes the shape of well-formed cubes which can exceed 10 cm, originating from several sites in Val di Fassa, Trentino, Italy.

== Formation and associated minerals ==
Analcime occurs as a primary mineral in analcime basalt and other alkaline igneous rocks. It also occurs as cavity and vesicle fillings associated with prehnite, calcite, and zeolites. Analcime forms in sedimentary rocks at temperatures below about 100 °C (212 °F), and so its presence indicates that the rock has experienced shallow diagenesis. Although it is common in igneous rocks (namely basalts and trachy-basalts), it is more rarely found in phonolites. Associations include zeolites, calcite and prehnite; however, it is also found in nepheline syenites and their pegmatites. It forms a series with pollucite.

== Locations ==
Well known locations for sourcing analcime include Croft Quarry in Leicestershire, UK; the Cyclopean Islands east off Sicily and near Trentino in northern Italy; Victoria in Australia; Kerguelen Island in the Indian Ocean; in the Lake Superior copper district of Michigan, Bergen Hill, New Jersey, Golden, Colorado, and at Searles Lake, California in the United States; and at Cape Blomidon, Nova Scotia and Mont Saint-Hilaire, Quebec in Canada; and in Iceland, and in Namibia. Siberian samples from Nidym and Toura provide us with white crystals of 18 cm. Samples of the Cyclopean Islands are known for their beautiful and clear crystals, just like the crystals of Kings Valley and Springfield in Oregon, which can reach up to 6 cm. Coleman, Alberta in Canada is known for producing beautiful red crystals.

== Usage ==
Other than its aesthetic values, analcime currently presents no use. Crystallized specimens are sought after by collectors, and the mineral is hardly ever made into jewelry. The crystals made into jewelries are uncut and handcrafted. It has lacking use as a microporous material. This is due to the fact that analcime has a compact structure and thus it has a strong resistance to diffusion of both molecules and cations. Analcime-bearing tuffs are sometimes used as building materials.

== See also ==
- List of minerals
