= Kandi, Benin =

Kandi
- Commune, arrondissement and city
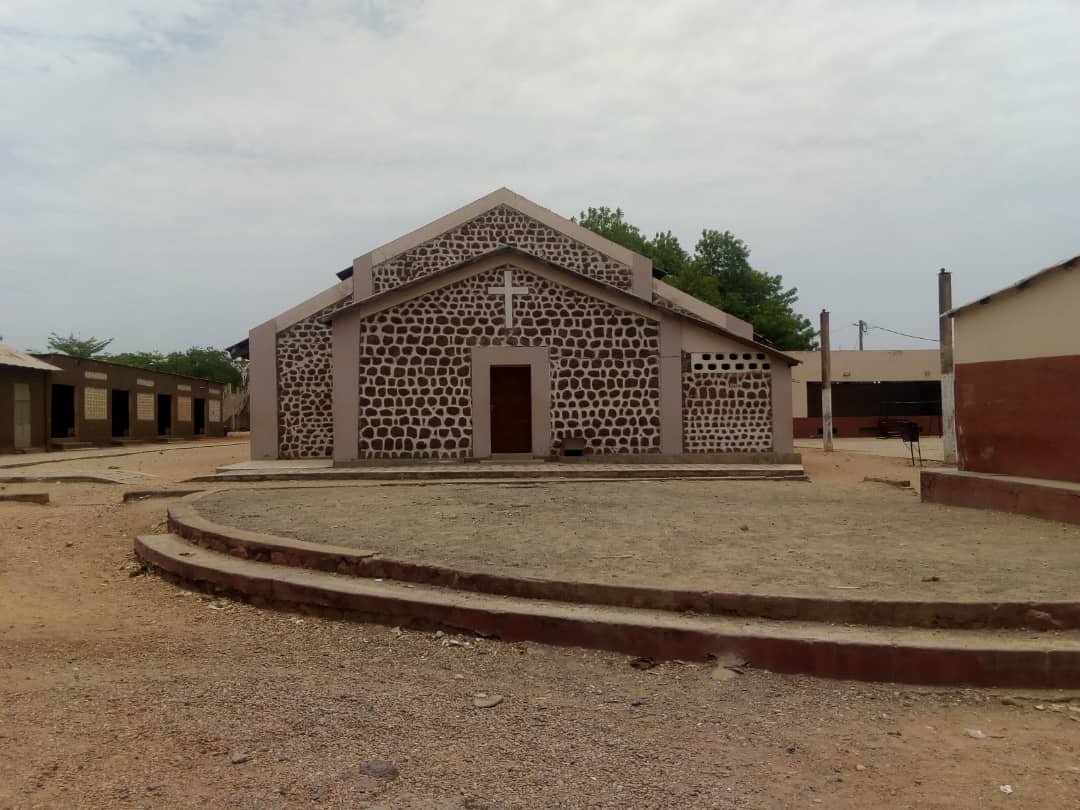
- Cathedral of Our Lady of Mount Carmel

- Location in Benin
- Coordinates: 11°07′43″N 2°56′13″E
- Country: Benin
- Department: Alibori Department

Area
  - Total: 3,421 km^{2} (1,321 sq mi)
- Elevation: 288 m (945 ft)

Population (2013)
  - Total: 177,683
  - Density: 51.94/km^{2} (134.5/sq mi)
- Time zone: UTC+1 (WAT)
- Postal address: BP: 30
- Area code: (+229) 23

Kandi [kɑ̃.di] is a town, arrondissement and commune in the Alibori Department of eastern Benin. Originally a market town, Kandi is now primarily a farming centre. It lies on the nation's main north-south highway, 650 km (400 mi) from Cotonou and 523 km (325 mi) north of Porto-Novo. The town is the capital of the department of Alibori. The commune covers an area of 3,421 km^{2} (1,321 sq mi) and as of 2013 had a population of 177,683 people. The town itself had a population of 27,227 in 2002.

== History ==
Kandi is claimed by the royal family to have been founded by elephant hunters of the Sinaboko (King) from the Bariba Kingdom of Nikki, one of the major capitals of the Borgu Confederation. However, what is more historically accurate is that in the first half of the eighteenth century (1700s), a number of aristocrats belonging to the Wasangari group of Nikki migrated into the already existing Mokole villages of Kandi and Guénè to establish themselves as a ruling social class. This is corroborated by the accounts of certain locals interviewed in a 2014 report where they stated that both Kandi and Guene were founded by Mokole people, and that in the case of Guene, the Wasangari did not conquer the town by force but by 'charming' the locals and cajoling them into allowing the Bariba taking power/control.

The neighboring villages are of the Bariba people in south and west, and the Mokole-Yoruba in the north and east. The migratory origin of the Bariba starts off in Bussa, Nigeria, while that of the Mokole traces back to populations who migrated during the period of the foundation of the Oyo Empire around the sixteenth century.

== Administrative divisions ==
Kandi is subdivided into 10 arrondissements: Kandi I, Kandi II, Kandi III, Angaradébou, Bensékou, Donwari, Kassakou, Saah, Sam and Sonsoro. They contain 39 villages and nine urban districts.

== Economy ==
Most of the population are engaged in agricultural activities, followed by trade, transportation and handicrafts. There are notable iron deposits of high quality in the vicinity. The main crops grown are maize, cotton, kapok, millet and peanuts.

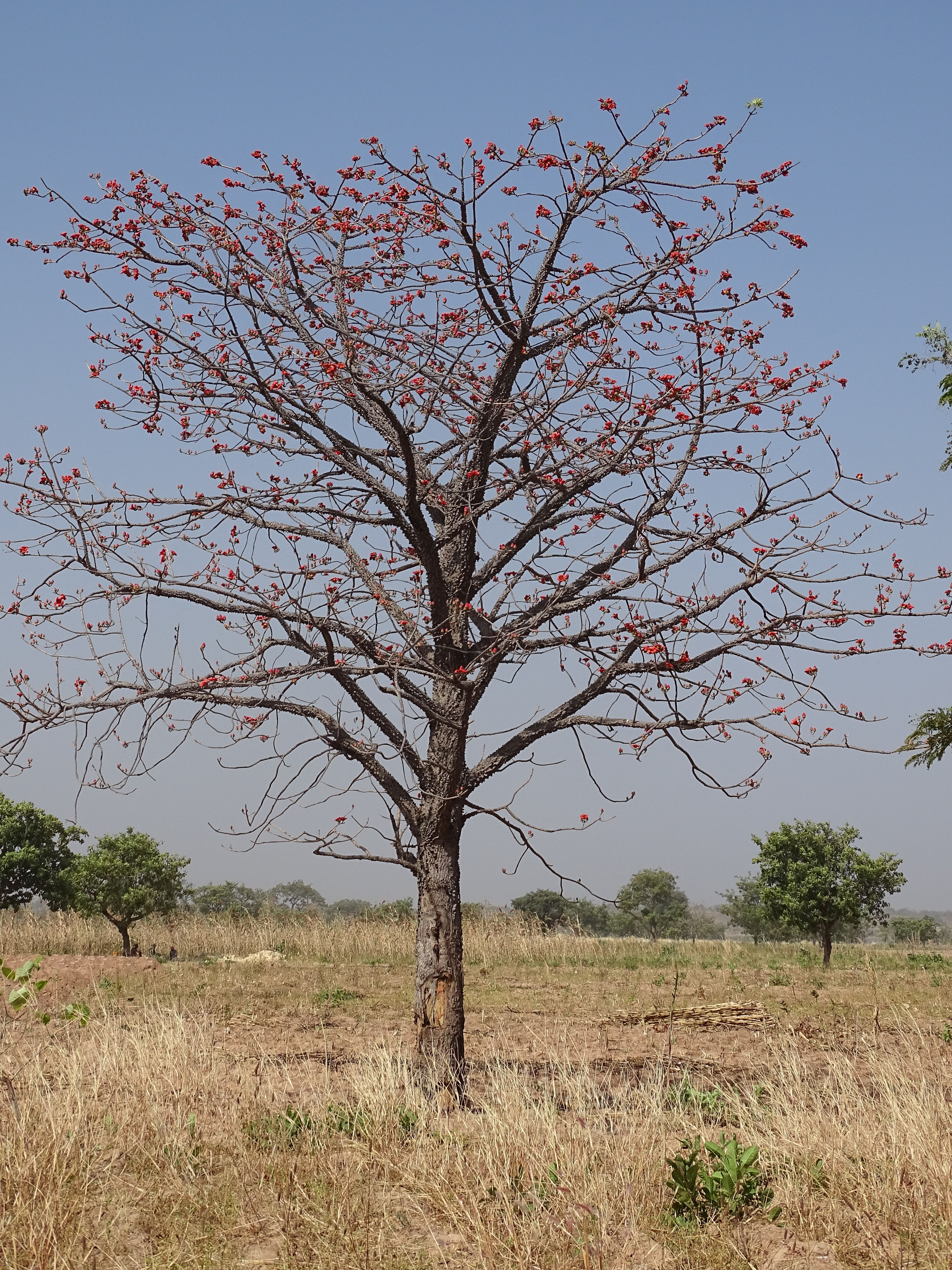
Bombax costatum around Pendjari National Park in Benin

Bombax costatum ('false kapok'; 'Kapokier à fleurs rouges') is locally important as an agriforest subsistence crop: its flowers and calices are used as food; its leaves provide fodder, while kapok fibre is obtained from its seed pods. For Benin as a whole, cotton (Gossypium spp.) is the most important crop for its international trade: In 2018, ninety-five percent of the country's cotton production was exported; cotton earned eighty percent of Benin's export income. As a cash crop, it makes a crucial contribution to the incomes of local farmers. Kandi is a major centre of the cotton-growing region and cotton-ginning factories in the commune provide local employment.

== Transport ==
The town is situated on the RNIE 2 highway and is served by Kandi Airport, which is located north of the main town.

== Geography ==
The commune of Kandi is located 650 kilometres (400 mi) from Cotonou, in the Sudanian savanna zone. Communally it is bounded to the north by Malanville, south by Gogounou, west by Banikoara and to the east by Ségbana.

=== Climate ===
Kandi has a tropical savanna climate (Köppen climate classification Aw).

Climate data for Kandi (1961–1990, extremes 1921–present)
Month	Jan	Feb	Mar	Apr	May	Jun	Jul	Aug	Sep	Oct	Nov	Dec	Year
Record high °C (°F)	41.2 (106.2)	43.0 (109.4)	43.3 (109.9)	43.9 (111.0)	43.3 (109.9)	40.9 (105.6)	38.9 (102.0)	39.9 (103.8)	39.8 (103.6)	41.5 (106.7)	39.5 (103.1)	39.5 (103.1)	43.9 (111.0)
Mean daily maximum °C (°F)	33.6 (92.5)	36.4 (97.5)	38.4 (101.1)	38.6 (101.5)	36.2 (97.2)	33.3 (91.9)	30.9 (87.6)	30.2 (86.4)	31.1 (88.0)	34.2 (93.6)	35.3 (95.5)	33.8 (92.8)	34.3 (93.7)
Daily mean °C (°F)	24.9 (76.8)	27.8 (82.0)	30.9 (87.6)	32.1 (89.8)	30.4 (86.7)	28.1 (82.6)	26.4 (79.5)	26.0 (78.8)	26.2 (79.2)	27.8 (82.0)	26.5 (79.7)	24.8 (76.6)	27.7 (81.9)
Mean daily minimum °C (°F)	16.1 (61.0)	19.2 (66.6)	23.4 (74.1)	25.6 (78.1)	24.6 (76.3)	22.9 (73.2)	21.9 (71.4)	21.8 (71.2)	21.4 (70.5)	21.4 (70.5)	17.7 (63.9)	15.8 (60.4)	21.0 (69.8)
Record low °C (°F)	10.0 (50.0)	12.6 (54.7)	15.2 (59.4)	17.0 (62.6)	16.5 (61.7)	14.9 (58.8)	18.6 (65.5)	19.0 (66.2)	15.0 (59.0)	14.0 (57.2)	10.8 (51.4)	5.0 (41.0)	5.0 (41.0)
Average precipitation mm (inches)	0.3 (0.01)	1.3 (0.05)	6.9 (0.27)	35.5 (1.40)	122.6 (4.83)	148.2 (5.83)	213.2 (8.39)	263.2 (10.36)	197.5 (7.78)	52.5 (2.07)	0.1 (0.00)	0.0 (0.0)	1,041.3 (41.00)
Average precipitation days (≥ 1.0 mm)	0	0	1	4	9	11	16	19	16	6	0	0	82
Average relative humidity (%)	33	28	36	52	65	75	82	85	85	76	54	40	59
Mean monthly sunshine hours	271.0	239.3	240.7	238.6	247.0	233.1	202.7	174.6	195.3	261.0	281.5	285.1	2,869
Source 1: NOAA (precipitation, sunshine hours 1991-2020)
Source 2: Deutscher Wetterdienst (humidity, 1951–1967), Meteo Climat (record highs and lows)

== See also ==
- Congregation of Christian Retreat
