= Bagou =

Bagou may refer to:

- Bagou, Benin, a town and arrondissement in Alibori Department, Benin
- Bagou Station, a station on the Beijing Subway in China
