= Tokey Banta =

Tokey Banta Toké-Banta
- Village
- Location in Benin
- Coordinates: 11.303°N 2.417°E
- Country: Benin
- Department: Alibori Department
- Commune: Banikoara
- Arrondissement: Banikoara

Population
  - Total: 2,258
- Time zone: UTC+1 (WAT)

Tokey Banta or Toké-Banta is a village in the commune of Banikoara in the Alibori Department of northern Benin.
