= Derou Garou =

- Village
- Location in Benin
- Coordinates: 11.293°N 2.397°E
- Country: Benin
- Department: Alibori Department
- Commune: Banikoara
- Arrondissement: Banikoara

Population
  - Total: 2,683
- Time zone: UTC+1 (WAT)

Derou Garou is a village in the commune of Banikoara in the Alibori Department of northern Benin.
