= Arbonga =

- Village
- Location in Benin
- Coordinates: 11°22′49″N 02°26′04″E
- Country: Benin
- Department: Alibori Department
- Commune: Banikoara
- Arrondissement: Banikoara

Population
  - Total: 2,512
- Time zone: UTC+1 (WAT)

Arbonga is a village in the commune of Banikoara in the Alibori Department of northern Benin.
