= Bouli River =

River in Benin

Coordinates: 10.917°N 3.205°E

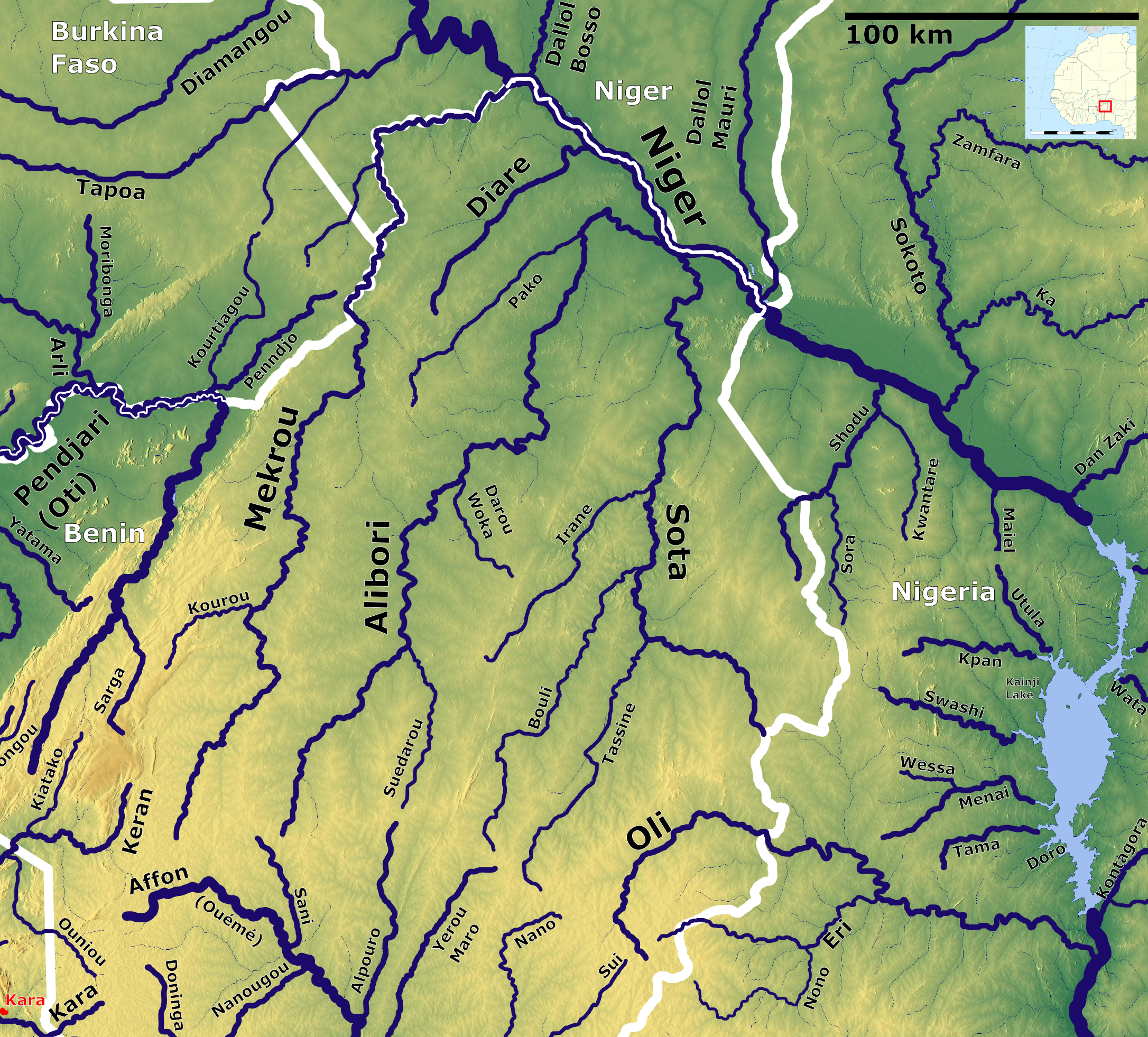
North Benin with the Bouli in the center south

The Bouli River is a river of Benin. A tributary of the Sota River, its headwaters are located north of Ina in Borgou Department and the river flows northeast, meeting the Sota near Bensékou in Alibori Department.
