= Kompa (disambiguation) =

Kompa may refer to:

- Kompa, Benin, a town and arrondissement in Benin
- Kompas, an Indonesian newspaper

== See also ==
- Kompa, a popular Haitian musical genre
