= Gogounou =

- Commune, arrondissement and city
- Location in Benin
- Coordinates: 10°50′19″N 2°50′10″E
- Country: Benin
- Department: Alibori Department

Area
  - Total: 4,910 km^{2} (1,900 sq mi)
- Elevation: 305 m (1,001 ft)

Population (2013 census)
  - Total: 117,793
  - Density: 24.0/km^{2} (62.1/sq mi)
- Time zone: UTC+1 (WAT)
- Postal address: BP: 07
- Area code: (+223) 23

Gogounou [gɔ.gu.nu] is a town, arrondissement and commune in the Alibori Department of Benin, about 35 kilometres south of Kandi. The commune covers an area of 4910 square kilometres and as of 2013 had a population of 117,793 people.

== Geography ==
Gogounou is located 71 kilometres (44 miles) from Kandi and 628 kilometres from Cotonou. It is bounded to the north by the communes of Kandi and Banikoara, south by Bembéréké and Sinendé, west with Kérou and to east by Ségbana.

== Administrative divisions ==
Gogounou is subdivided into 6 arrondissements; Gogounou, Bagou, Gounarou, Ouara, Sori and Zoungou-Pantrossi. They contain 34 villages and 4 urban districts.

== Economy ==
Most of the population are engaged in agricultural activities followed by trade, transportation and handicrafts. 29 980,00 hectares of land are devoted to agriculture, accounting for 9.96% of the total land area. The main crops grown are maize, cotton, sorghum, and yams.

As of May 2009, Gogounou has five hours of electricity per night from 7 pm until midnight. The two primary sources of water in Gogounou are wells and foot powered pumps. The town of Gogounou has a post office, faxed telephone line service, and four cellular communication services available as of August 2009. These are Bell Benin (BBcom), Global Com (Glo), MTN and Moov. Networks with GSM enabled networks that can provide internet access through mobile devices.

== Education ==
The town of Gogounou has at least two public primary schools, one Catholic private primary school, and one secondary school. The secondary school is known as CEG Gogounou and has 754 male and 626 female students as of January 2010. There are 37 primary schools within the entire commune.
