= Weterou =

- Village
- Location in Benin
- Coordinates: 11°17′57″N 2°26′18″E
- Country: Benin
- Department: Alibori Department
- Commune: Banikoara
- Arrondissement: Banikoara

Population
  - Total: 2,552
- Time zone: UTC+1 (WAT)

Weterou is a village in the commune of Banikoara in the Alibori Department of northern Benin.
