= Kandi II =

- Arrondissement
- Location in Benin
- Coordinates: 11°07′59″N 02°56′07″E
- Country: Benin
- Department: Alibori Department
- Commune: Kandi

Population (2002)
  - Total: 10,465
- Time zone: UTC+1 (WAT)

Kandi II is an arrondissement of the Alibori Department of northeastern Benin. It is an administrative division under the jurisdiction of the commune of Kandi and forms part of the area of the city itself. According to the population census conducted by the Institut National de la Statistique Benin on February 15, 2002, the arrondissement had a total population of 10,465.
