= Toura =

- Arrondissement and town
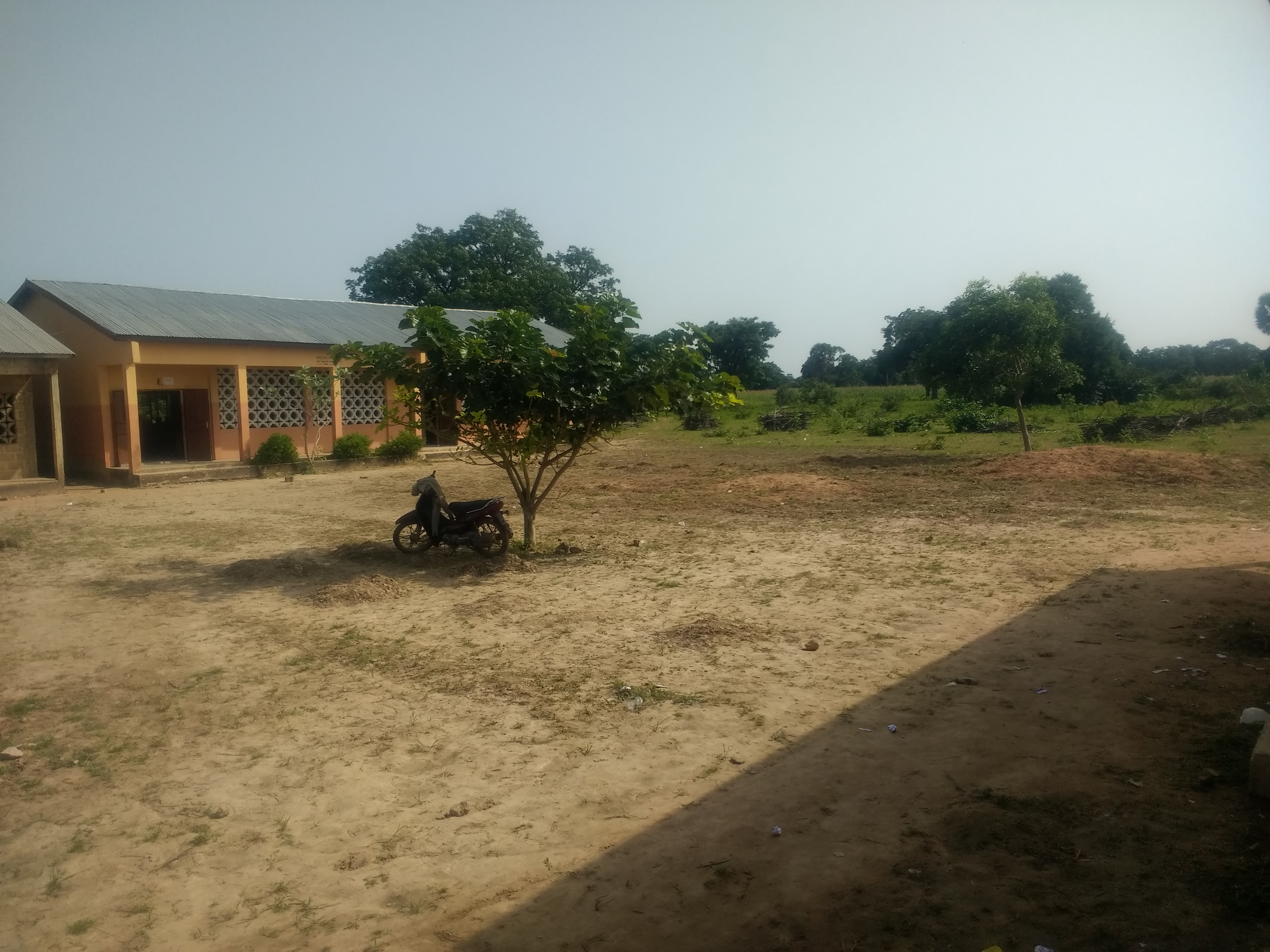

- Location in Benin
- Coordinates: 11°14′37″N 2°22′59″E
- Country: Benin
- Department: Alibori Department
- Commune: Banikoara

Population (2002)
  - Total: 13,110
- Time zone: UTC+1 (WAT)

Toura is a town and arrondissement in the Alibori Department of northern Benin. It is an administrative division under the jurisdiction of the commune of Banikoara. According to the population census conducted by the Institut National de la Statistique Benin on February 15, 2002, the arrondissement had a total population of 13,110.
