= Zou River =

River in Benin

Coordinates: 7.0014°N 2.4044°E

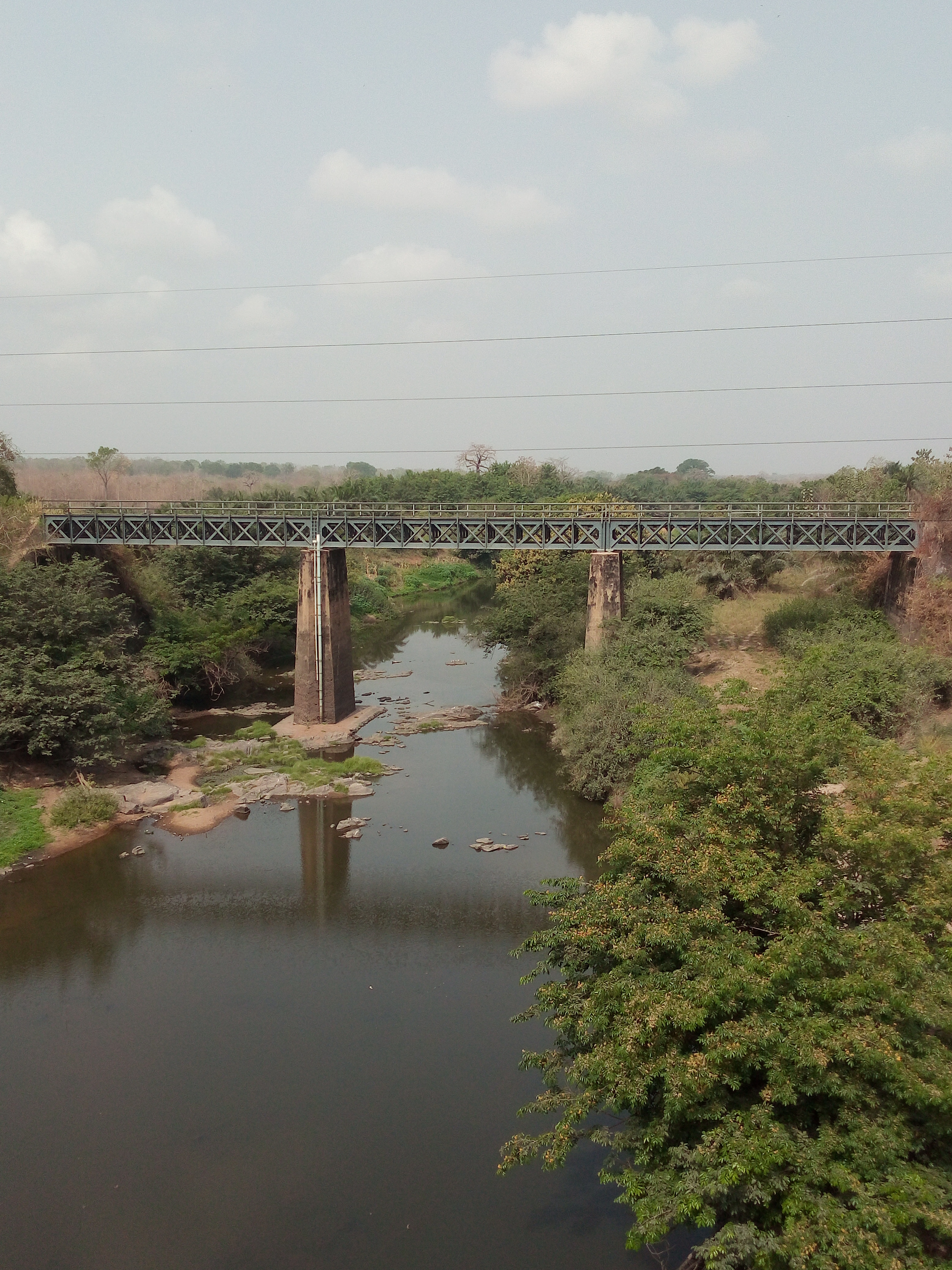

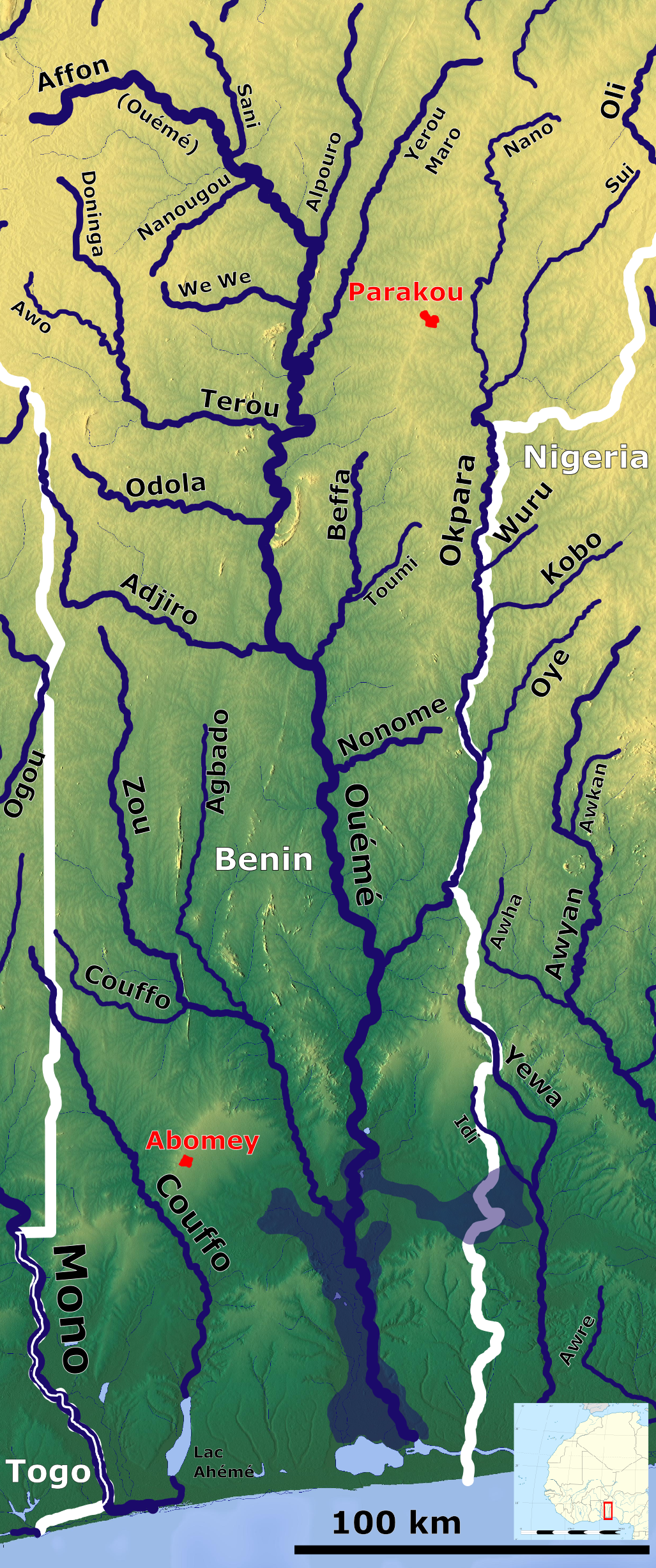
- Ouémé River system with the Zou (south west)

- Location of mouth

Location
- Countries: Benin

Basin features
- River system: Ouémé River

The Zou is a river of south-western Benin. It drains into the Ouémé River. The river banks are inhabited in parts by the Mahi people near the Togo border.

== See also ==
- List of rivers of Benin
