= Malanville =

- Commune, arrondissement and city
- Location in Benin
- Coordinates: 11°52′0″N 3°23′0″E
- Country: Benin
- Department: Alibori Department

Area
  - Total: 3,016 km^{2} (1,164 sq mi)
- Elevation: 160 m (520 ft)

Population (2013 census)
  - Total: 168,006
  - Density: 55.70/km^{2} (144.3/sq mi)
- Time zone: UTC+1 (WAT)
- Postal address: BP: 51
- Area code: (+229) 23

Malanville [ma.lɑ̃.vil] is a city, arrondissement and commune in the Alibori Department of northeastern Benin, located across the River Niger from Niger. It is known as a centre of cross-border trade and has a major market. Malanville is also a centre for rice-growing. The commune covers an area of 3016 square kilometres and as of 2013 had a population of 168,006 people.

== Demographics ==
Malanville has an extremely diverse population consisting of a large Muslim community, large Christian community, French speakers and speakers of local languages, as well as several practitioners of local religions. The cuisine is a mixture of African and European. Despite the differences that exist between these groups, they live side by side in peace and share public and private sector responsibilities.

== Geography ==
Malanville is located in Bénin's northern region, along the Bénin/Niger border, located 733 kilometres from Cotonou. It is connected to the city of Gaya, Niger via a bridge over the Niger River. It resides approximately 35 km down the Niger River from Karimama which it is indirectly connected to via road. The terrain and climate are desert-like, arid, and sunny, and have little water.

Communally, Malanville is bounded to the north by Niger, the south by Kandi and Ségbana, to the west by Karimama and to the east by Nigeria.

== Administrative divisions ==
Malanville is subdivided into five arrondissements; Malanville, Garou, Guénè, Mandécali and Tomboutou . They contain 20 villages and 12 urban districts.

== Economy ==
The population of Malanville engages primarily in agricultural activities, followed by trade, transportation and handicrafts. The main crops grown are rice, onions, groundnuts and tomatoes. The tourism sector is growing as the shared border with Niger allows visitors to experience National Park W, a game reserve with elephants, giraffe, etc. Services such as hotels and restaurants are starting to develop due to greater levels of tourism.

== Culture and education ==
There is a high school and three elementary/middle schools, but there is not any type of cultural center or public library in Malanville.
