= Karimama, Benin =

Karimama
- Commune, arrondissement and city
- Location in Benin
- Coordinates: 12°04′N 3°11′E
- Country: Benin
- Department: Alibori Department

Area
  - Total: 6,102 km^{2} (2,356 sq mi)
- Elevation: 164 m (538 ft)

Population (2013 census)
  - Total: 66,675
  - Density: 10.93/km^{2} (28.30/sq mi)
- Time zone: UTC+1 (WAT)
- Area code: (+229) 95

Karimama [ka.ʁi.ma.ma] is a town, arrondissement and commune in the Alibori Department of northeastern Benin. The commune covers an area of 6102 square kilometers and as of 2013 had a population of 66,675 people. The town lies on the border with Niger.

== Geography ==
The commune of Karimana is located 778 kilometres from Cotonou and lies on the Niger River. Communally it is bounded to the north and east by Niger, south by Malanville and to the west by Banikoara.

== History ==
Karimama was founded by Gurma or Gourmanché speaking people from Burkina Faso in the eighteenth century along the Niger river valley amongst Dendi people.

== Administrative divisions ==
Karimana is subdivided into 5 arrondissements; Karimama, Birni-Lafia, Bogo-Bogo, Kompa and Monsey. They contain 16 villages and 2 urban districts.

== Economy ==
Most of the population are engaged in agricultural activities followed by trade, transportation and handicrafts. The main crops grown are maize, cotton, sorghum, cowpeas, peanut, okra, cassava, onion, potatoes and rice.

== Climate ==
Karimama has a hot semi-arid climate (Köppen BSh) with an arid, sweltering dry season and a less hot but oppressively humid wet season.

Climate data for Karimama
Month	Jan	Feb	Mar	Apr	May	Jun	Jul	Aug	Sep	Oct	Nov	Dec	Year
Mean daily maximum °C (°F)	33.6 (92.5)	36.6 (97.9)	39.5 (103.1)	40.4 (104.7)	38.1 (100.6)	35.5 (95.9)	32.5 (90.5)	31.4 (88.5)	32.7 (90.9)	36.1 (97.0)	36.5 (97.7)	33.9 (93.0)	35.6 (96.0)
Daily mean °C (°F)	25.8 (78.4)	29 (84)	32.1 (89.8)	33.6 (92.5)	32.5 (90.5)	30.1 (86.2)	27.8 (82.0)	27 (81)	27.6 (81.7)	29.3 (84.7)	28.1 (82.6)	26 (79)	29.1 (84.4)
Mean daily minimum °C (°F)	18 (64)	21.5 (70.7)	24.8 (76.6)	26.9 (80.4)	27 (81)	24.7 (76.5)	23.2 (73.8)	22.7 (72.9)	22.6 (72.7)	22.6 (72.7)	19.8 (67.6)	18.1 (64.6)	22.7 (72.8)
Average rainfall mm (inches)	0 (0)	0 (0)	2 (0.1)	17 (0.7)	49 (1.9)	111 (4.4)	165 (6.5)	191 (7.5)	130 (5.1)	19 (0.7)	0 (0)	0 (0)	684 (26.9)
Source: Climate-Data.org
