= Madécali =

- Arrondissement and town
- Location in Benin
- Coordinates: 11°42′16″N 03°32′58″E
- Country: Benin
- Department: Alibori Department
- Commune: Malanville
- Time zone: UTC+1 (WAT)

Madécali is an arrondissement in the Alibori Department of northeastern Benin. It is an administrative division under the jurisdiction of the commune of Malanville. According to the population census conducted by the Institut National de la Statistique Benin on February 15, 2002, the arrondissement had a total population of 14,105.
