= Cyclopean Isles =

Island group

Coordinates: 37°33′41.4″N 15°09′58.7″E

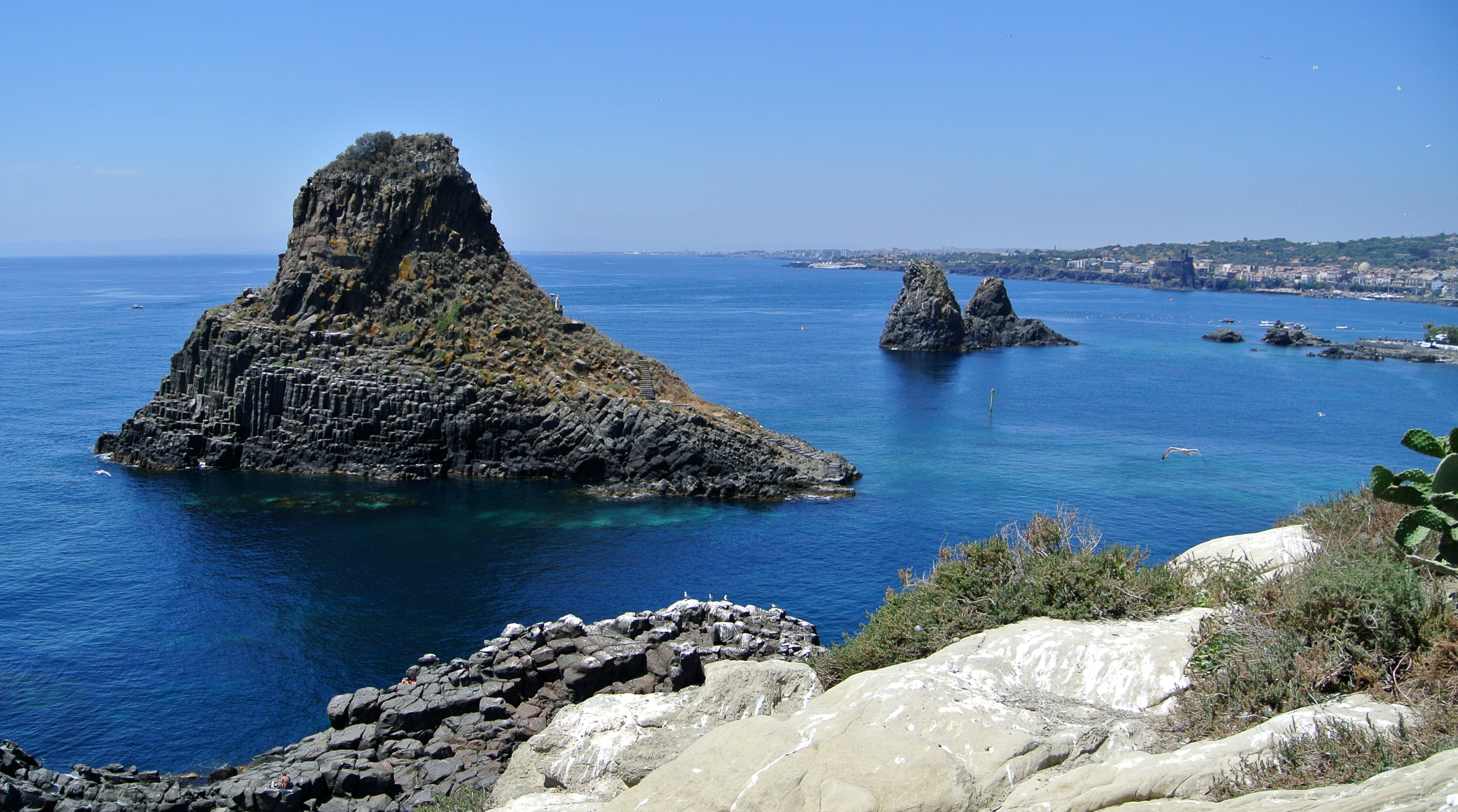
Cyclopean Isles seen from Lachea

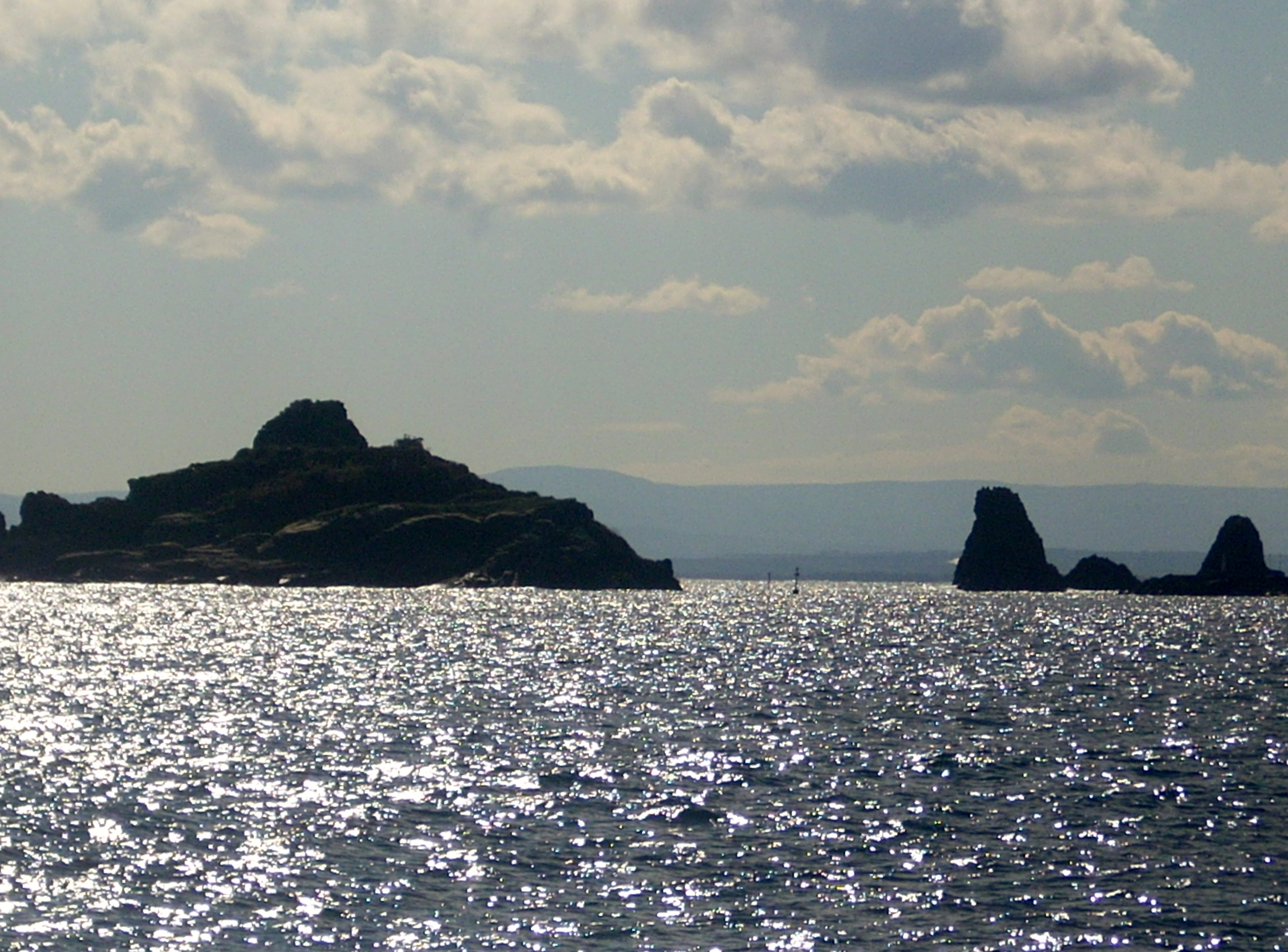
Panoramic view of the Cyclopean Isles as seen from Capo Mulini

The Cyclopean Isles (Italian: Isole Ciclopi), noted for their rows of basaltic columns piled one above another, lie not far from Mount Etna off the eastern coast of Sicily in the Mediterranean Sea.

== Geology ==
Formed about 500,000 years ago, the Cyclopean Isles are of volcanic origin and may at one time have been attached to Sicily.

The Cyclopean Isles strongly resemble the Giant's Causeway on the northern coast of Northern Ireland, and the Isle of Staffa off the western coast of Scotland. The latter, closest in appearance to the Cyclopean pair, differs mainly in having the columns piled in terraces, one above another.

A mineral known as analcime can be found in the Cyclopean Isles and was first discovered on the Cyclopean Isles in lava by French geologist Déodat de Dolomieu.

== Homer's legend ==
There is an ancient tradition that the islands at one time formed part of the mainland of Sicily.

Homer has a curious story about the manner in which they became detached, towards the end of the ninth book of the Odyssey. When Odysseus visited Sicily it was inhabited by the Cyclopes, said to have had only one eye, on the forehead.

Odysseus encounters one of their number, Polyphemus, on his journey home to Ithaca, who kills two of Odysseus's men. Stuck inside Polyphemus's cave because he and his men are unable to move the boulder that blocks the entrance, Odysseus supplies Polyphemus with a special wine until he falls asleep, and blinds him by drilling the Cyclops's own wooden walking stick into his eye. Polyphemus opens the cave boulder and the Greeks escape to their ship; Polyphemus calls to the other Cyclopes for help and Odysseus, from the distance of his ship, begins to taunt and to jeer at him. Homer (Alexander Pope's translation) says:

These words the Cyclops' burning rage provoke:
From the tall hill he rends a pointed rock;
High o'er the billows flew the massy load,
And near the ship came thund'ring on the flood.
It almost brushed the helm, and fell before:
The whole sea shook, and refluent beat the shore.

Odysseus boasts that it was "Odysseus ... Son of Laertes" who had burnt out Polyphemus's eye. Polyphemus invokes the vengeance of his father Poseidon, and:

A larger rock then heaving from the plain,
He whirled it round--it rung across the main:
It fell and brushed the stern: the billows roar,
Shake at the weight, and refluent beat the shore.
