= Okpara River =

River in Benin/Nigeria

Coordinates: 6°26′N 2°33′E

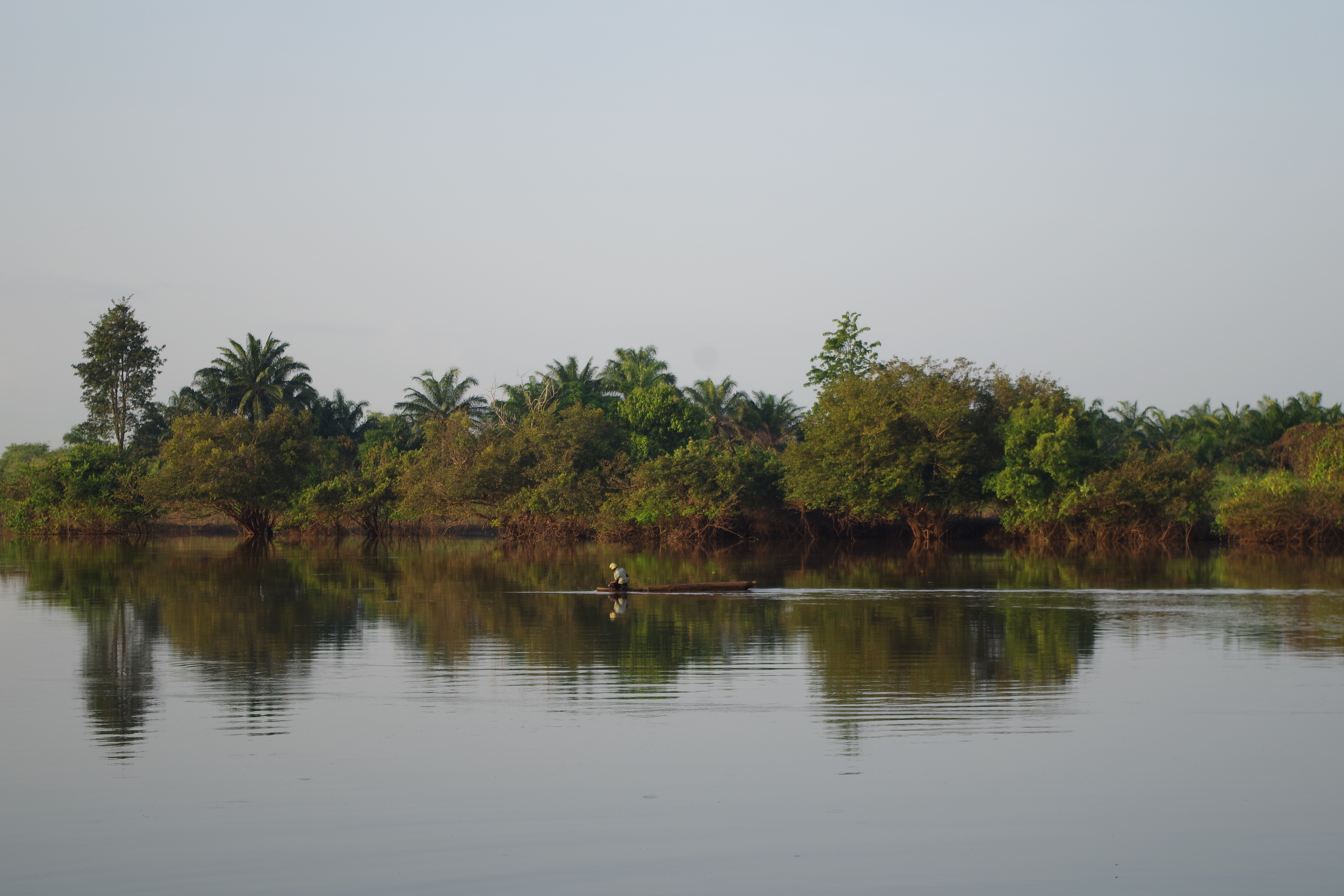
The waters of the Okpara River in Benin

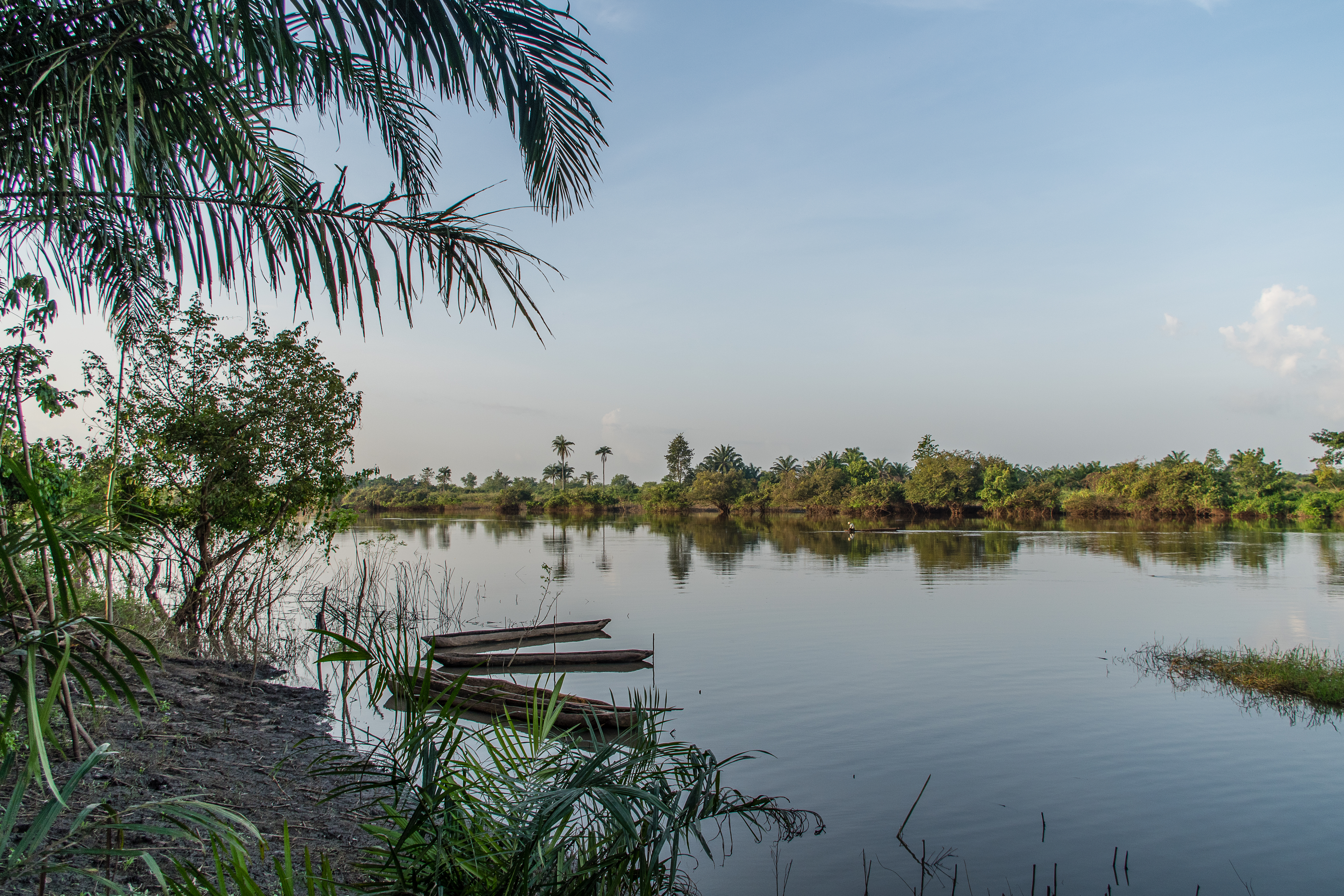
Okpara River

The Okpara River is a river of Benin. Originating in Borgou Department, it flows south and becomes the border between Nigeria and Benin before re-entering Benin and flowing into the Ouémé River, which ultimately drains into the Atlantic Ocean. Several villages along the river are disputed between Benin and Nigeria.

== Pollution ==
Report says that the Okpara River heavily contaminated by toxic metals.

== Climate ==
Okpara River is a stream in Nigeria. It is located at an elevation of 75 metres above sea level. It has coordinates of 7°45'0" N and 2°28'60" E in DMS or 7.75 and 2.48333. It is a Stream body of running water moving to a lower level in a channel on land.
