= Ségbana =

- Commune, arrondissement and city
- Location in Benin
- Coordinates: 10°55′40″N 3°41′40″E
- Country: Benin
- Department: Alibori Department

Area
  - Total: 4,471 km^{2} (1,726 sq mi)
- Elevation: 258 m (846 ft)

Population (2013 census)
  - Total: 89,268
  - Density: 19.97/km^{2} (51.71/sq mi)
- Time zone: UTC+1 (WAT)
- Postal address: BP: 14
- Area code: (+229) 23

Ségbana [seg.ba.na] is a town, arrondissement and commune located in the Alibori Department of Benin. The commune covers an area of 4471 square kilometres or 1726 square miles and as of 2013 had a population of 89,268 people.

== Geography ==
The commune of Ségbana is located 722 kilometres (449 miles) from Cotonou and lies on the Niger River. Communally it is bounded to the north by Malanville, south by Kalalé, west by Kandi and Gogounou and east by Nigeria. The elevation is 258 metres (846 feet).

== History ==
With the Séro Kpéra camp in Parakou, the civil prison of Ségbana was, during the 1980s under the regime of President Mathieu Kérékou, a prison establishment specially assigned to the detention of political prisoners, sometimes presented as a place of torture, but this point is not confirmed by the filmed testimonies of former prisoners. According to them, the tortures were rather practiced in the Parakou camp.

== Administrative divisions ==
Ségbana is subdivided into 5 arrondissements; Ségbana, Libantè, Liboussou, Lougou and Sokotindji. They contain 25 villages and 5 urban districts.

== Economy ==
Most of the population are engaged in agricultural activities followed by trade, transportation and handicrafts. The main crops grown are maize, cotton, sorghum, and yams.
