= Alpouro River =

River in Benin

- Location of mouth

Location
- Country: Benin
- Department: Borgou

Physical characteristics
- Mouth
  - coordinates: 9.534°N 2.339°E

Basin features
- River system: Ouémé River

The Alpouro River is a river in Borgou Department, Benin. It drains into the Ouémé River in Ouémé-Supérieur Classified Forest south of Bori.
