= Pako River =

River in Benin

Coordinates: 11.941°N 3.029°E

The Pako River is a river in Alibori Department, Benin. It is a tributary of the Alibori River.
