= Tobré =

Coordinates: 10°12′N 2°08′E

- Arrondissement and town
- Interactive map of Tobré
- Country: Benin
- Department: Atakora Department
- Commune: Péhunco

Population (2002)
  - Total: 16,912
- Time zone: UTC+1 (WAT)

Tobré is a town and arrondissement in the Atakora Department of northwestern Benin. It is an administrative division under the jurisdiction of the commune of Péhunco. According to the population census conducted by the Institut National de la Statistique Benin on 15 February 2002, the arrondissement had a total population of 16.912.
