= Banikoara =

- Commune, arrondissement and city
- Location in Benin
- Coordinates: 11°18′N 2°26′E
- Country: Benin
- Department: Alibori Department

Area
  - Commune, arrondissement and city: 4,383 km^{2} (1,692 sq mi)
- Elevation: 300 m (980 ft)

Population (2013)
  - Commune, arrondissement and city: 248,621
  - Density: 56.72/km^{2} (146.9/sq mi)
  - Metro: 28,402
- Time zone: UTC+1 (WAT)
- Postal address: BP: 01
- Area code: (+223) 29

Banikoara [ba.ni.kwa.ʁa] is a town, arrondissement and commune located in the Alibori Department of Benin. It lies 69 kilometers west of Kandi at the heart of the most productive cotton-growing region in Benin. Its name is a Europeanized version of a Bariba phrase meaning "Bani's town", and honors its founder, Bani Gansé.

Banikoara, like many areas of Benin, is home to a constituent monarchy.

== Administrative divisions ==
Banikoara is subdivided into 10 arrondissements; Banikoara, Founougo, Gomparou, Goumori, Kokey, Kokiborou, Ounet, Sompérékou, Soroko and Toura. They contain 53 villages and 11 urban districts.

The arrondissement of Banikoara contains the villages of Arbonga, Demanou, Derou Garou, Kokire, Kommon, Kori Ginguiri, Tokey Banta, Wagou, Weterou and Yadikparou.

== Demographics ==
The commune covers an area of 4383 square kilometres and as of 2002 had a population of 152,028 people. In 2008 there was an estimated 24,917 living in the main town.

== Economy ==
Most of the population are engaged in agricultural activities followed by trade and handicrafts. 51 024,00 hectares of land are devoted to agriculture, accounting for 7.32% of the total land area. The main crops grown are maize, cotton, sorghum and cowpeas.

Electricity used in Banikora often has to be produced by a generator due to a defective solar system and unreliable mains electricity. The telephone lines are in poor condition, which makes it difficult to maintain a regular and reliable connection for Internet access. Banikoara is 60 kilometres from the nearest hard road and its development is hampered by its isolation until infrastructure develops.

== Media ==
UNESCO has donated four computers and other equipment and provided an initial two-week training and been responsible for the establishment of a radio station in Banikoara in 1994. They had provided education to local people in basic IT and Internet skills since February 2002, text processing, photocopying, scanning, printing and photography.
