= Alibori Department =

Department of Benin

Alibori
- Department
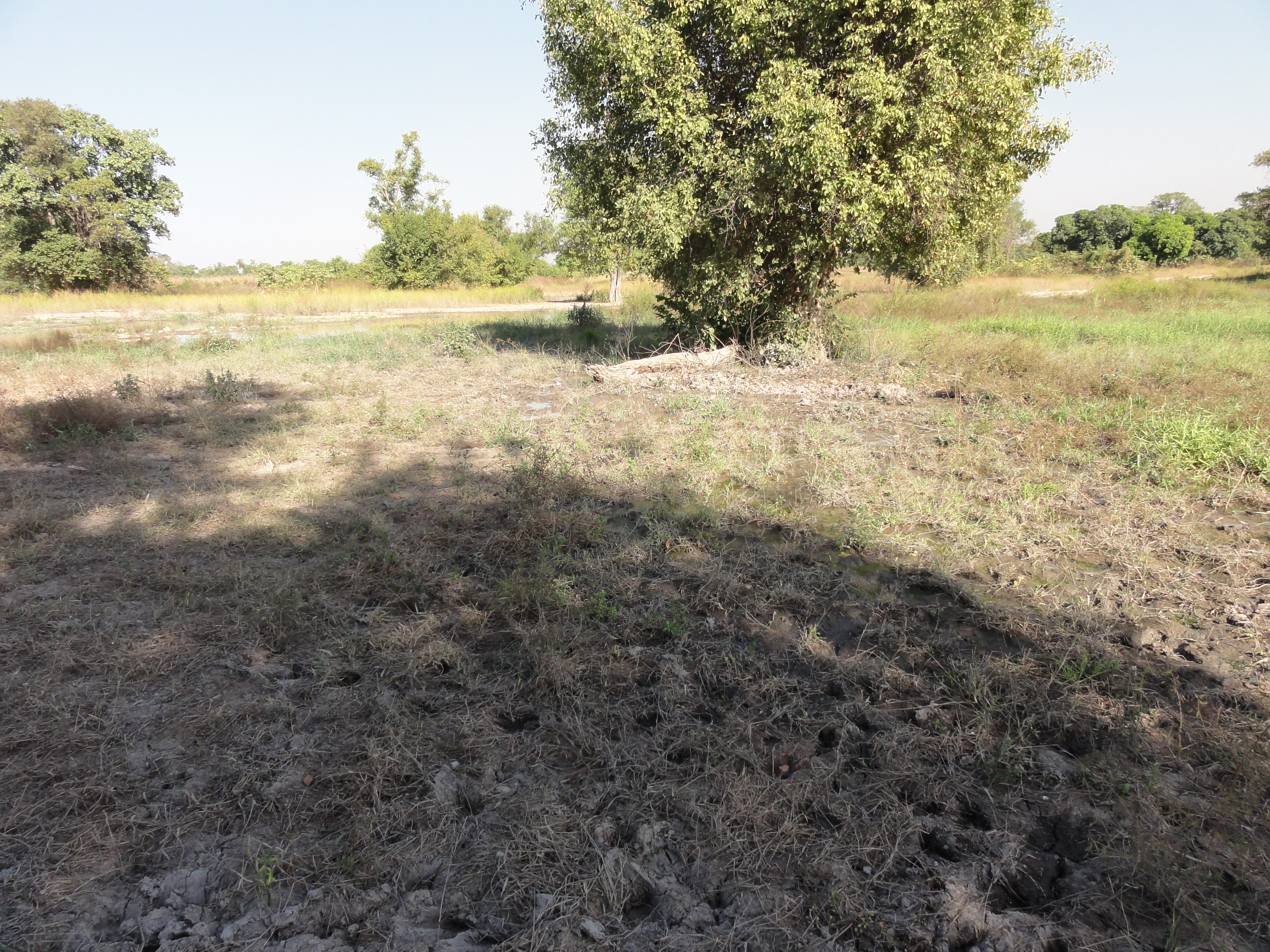

- Map highlighting the Alibori Department
- Coordinates: 11°07′43″N 02°56′13″E
- Country: Benin
- Capital: Kandi

Area
  - Total: 26,242 km^{2} (10,132 sq mi)

Population (2013 Census)
  - Total: 868,046
  - Density: 33.079/km^{2} (85.673/sq mi)
- Time zone: UTC+1 (WAT)

Alibori [a.li.bɔ.ʁi] is the largest and northernmost department (French: département) of Benin. Externally the department borders the countries of Burkina Faso, Niger, and Nigeria, and internally the departments of Atakora and Borgou. The department of Alibori was created in 1999 when it was split off from Borgou Department and is named after the Alibori River.

As of 2013, the total population of the department was 867,463, with 431,357 males and 436,106 females. The proportion of women was 50.30%. The total rural population was 75.70%, while the urban population was 24.30%. The total labour force in the department was 201,622, of which 25.40% were women. The proportion of households with no level of education was 83.70%.

== Geography ==
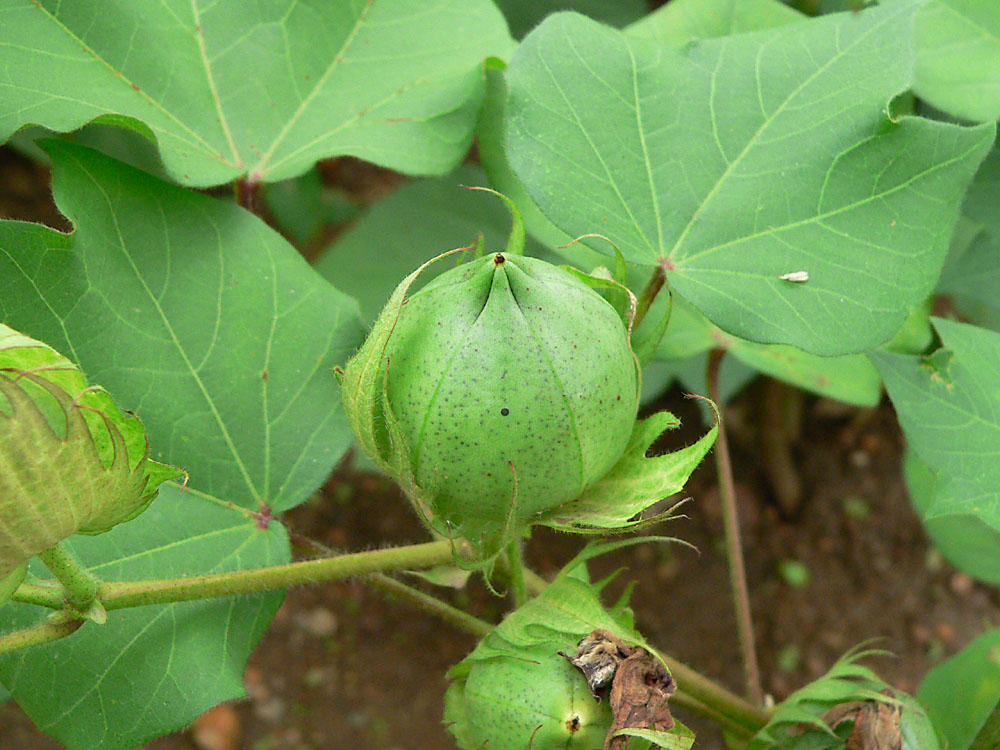
Cotton plants cultivated near Kandi

Alibori borders Niger to the north, Nigeria to the east, Borgou Department to the south, Atakora Department to the west, and Burkina Faso to the north-west. Alibori is a fertile region consisting of highland and savannah. Cotton, maize and cassava are the major crops grown. The northeast plains slope down to the valley of the Niger River which, along with the Mékrou River, forms the border with Niger. Other major rivers include the Alibori River, Sota River and Pako River. The department contains the bulk of Benin's section of the trans-boundary W National Park.

The climate is mostly humid and tropical. The northern regions of Benin, in general, receives one season of rainfall from May to September, compared to the southern regions which receive two spells from March to July and September to November. Harmattan winds blow from the northeast from December through March. The average temperature from April to June is 40 °C (104 °F) in Karimama, while the temperature ranges between 12 and 25 °C (54 and 77 °F) between November and March. The average elevation of the department is 200 m (660 ft) above the mean sea level.

=== Settlements ===
Kandi is the departmental capital; other major settlements include Banikoara, Gounarou, Guénè, Malanville and Ségbana.

== Demographics ==
Religious census
Religion	Percent(%)
Muslim	81.3%
Methodist	0.5%
Vodoun	0.5%
Catholic	8.6%
Celestial	0.2%
Other Christian	0.9%
Other Traditional	1.8%
Other	0.4%
Other Protestant	0.4%

According to Benin's 2013 census, the total population of the department was 867,463, with 431,357 males and 436,106 females. The proportion of women was 50.30%. The total rural population was 75.70%, while the urban population was 24.30%. The proportion of women of childbearing age (15 to 49 years old) was 22.00%. The foreign population was 28,636, representing 3.30% of the total population in the department. The labour force participation rate among foreigners aged 15–64 years was 26.40%. The proportion of women among the foreign population constituted 47.60%. The number of households in the department was 108,351 and the average household size was 8. The intercensal growth rate of the population was 4.60%.

Among women, the average age of first marriage was 18.2 and the average age at maternity was 27.2. The synthetic index of fertility of women was 5.7. The average number of families in a house was 1.7 and the average number of persons per room was 2.0. The total labour force in the department was 201,622, of which 25.40% were women. The proportion of households with no level of education was 83.70% and the proportion of households with children attending school was 23.00%. The crude birth rate was 40.9, the general rate of fertility was 185.90 and the gross reproduction rate was 2.80.

The main ethnolinguistic groups in the department are the Bariba, Dendi and Fulani. Other groups include the Boko, Gurma, Kyenga and the Mokole Yoruba.

== Administrative divisions ==
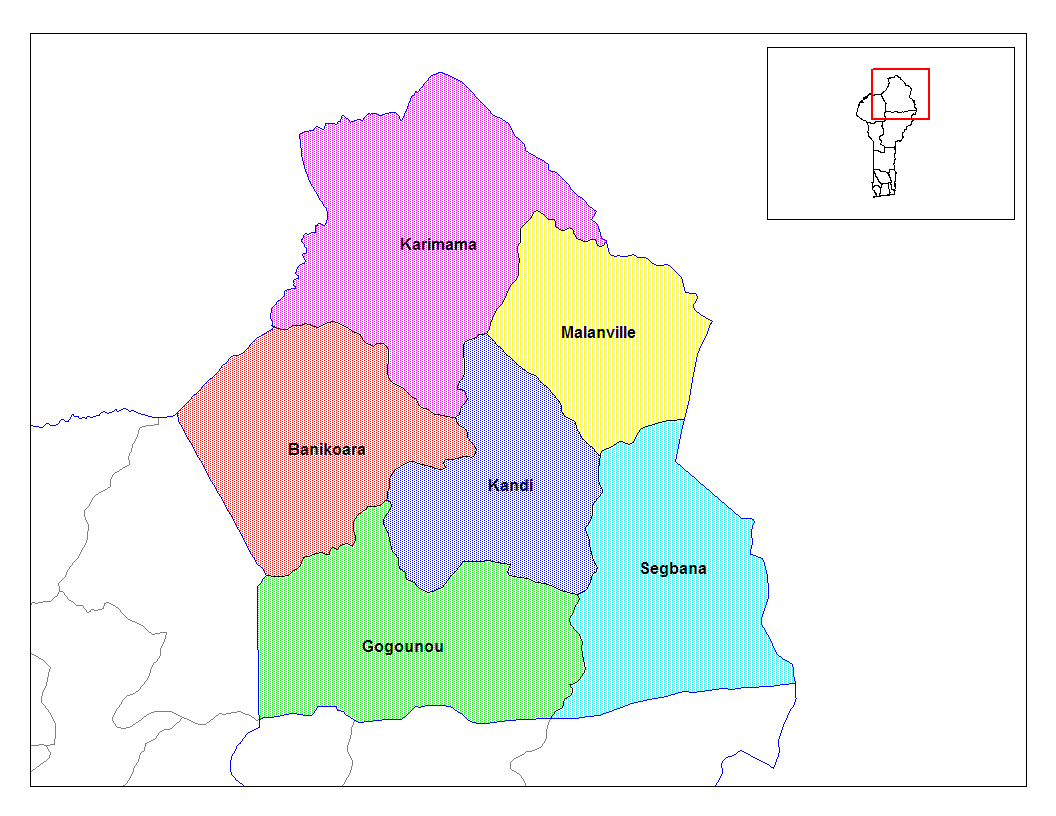
Communes of Alibori

The department of Alibori was created in 1999, when it was split off from Borgou Department. Since 2008, the department's capital has been Kandi. Alibori is subdivided into six communes, each centered at one of the principal towns: Banikoara, Gogounou, Kandi, Karimama, Malanville and Ségbana.

Benin originally had six administrative regions (départements), which have now been bifurcated to make 12. Each of the deconcentrated administrative services (directions départementales) of the sectoral ministries takes care of two administrative regions. A law passed in 1999 transformed the sous-prefectures, the lowest level of territorial administration, into local governments. Municipalities and communal councils have elected representatives who manage the administration of the regions. The latest elections of the municipal and communal councils were held in June 2015.
