= Bariba people =

Bariba Baatonu / Baatombu
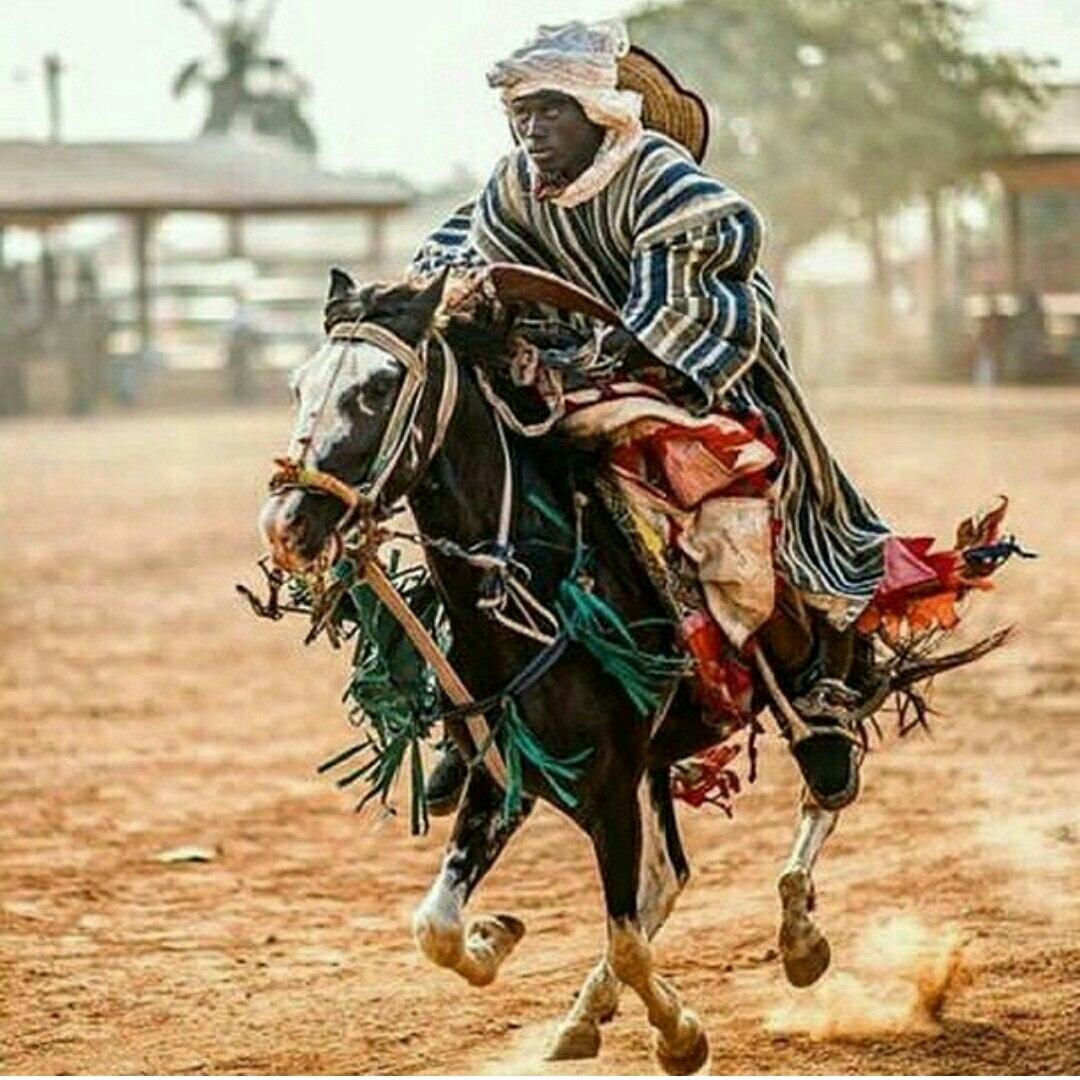

Total population
- c. 1.4 million

Regions with significant populations
- Benin: 687,300 (2010)
- Nigeria: 400,000 (2016)

Languages
- Bariba, Dendi, Hausa, Fulfulde, Yoruba French, English

Religion
- Primarily Islam, with a minority practicing traditional African religion

Related ethnic groups
- Gur: Dagomba, Gurma, Gurunsi, Mossi, Somba, Yoruba, Nupe, Dendi and others

The Bariba people, self designation Baatonu (plural Baatombu), are the principal inhabitants of Borgou and Alibori Departments, Benin, and cofounders of the Borgu kingdom of what is now northeast Benin and west-central Nigeria. In Nigeria, they are domiciled in the Baruten local government area of western Kwara State. There are perhaps a million Bariba, 70% of them in Benin, where they constitute the fourth largest ethnic group in the country, comprising approximately 1/11 or 9.2% of the national population.

The Bariba are concentrated primarily in the north-east of the country, especially around the city of Nikki, which is considered the traditional Bariba capital. At the end of the 18th century (1782), they became independent from the Yoruba of Oyo and formed several kingdoms in the Borgou region. The colonization of Benin (then Dahomey) by the French at the end of the 19th century, and the imposition of an Anglo-French artificial border, ended Bariba trade in the region.

One of their noted festivals is the annual Gani festival of which horse riding is a prominent element.

The Bariba people hold an important place in the history of the country. During the late 19th century, Baribawas known to constitute independent statesand dominate with kingdomsin cities like Nikki and Kandi in the northeast of the country. In the town of Pehunko, there are approximately 200,000 Bariba people out of 365,000 inhabitants.

Agriculture is the dominant occupation for the Bariba. They grow corn, sorghum, rice, cotton, cassava (tapioca), yams, beans, palm oil, peanuts, Soya beans and some poultry and livestock. Religion plays an important role in the Bariba tribe and they are primarily Islamic. However, a number of Bariba communities have their own indigenous beliefs.

== Language ==
Baatonum, also known as Bariba (also Baatombu, Baatonu, Barba, Baruba, Berba and many other names and spellings), is the language of the Bariba people of Benin and Nigeria. It was one of the languages of the traditional state of Borgu.

== History ==
=== Origins ===
According to some versions of their history, the Wasangari first settled in the region of Nikki-Wenu around 1480, it having been occupied from 1350 by the Baatonu natives. Coming from the East, they initially settled in Bussa in what is now Nigeria, where Kisra, the legendary Wasangari horseman from Persia had formed an alliance with Mansa Doro left Bussa for Nikki-Wenu with his groom Sero, the son of Kisra who entrusted Mansa Doro with the education of Sero. Before leaving the region again to join Kisra, Mansa Doro nominated his protégé Sero as the new chief. Decked out in hunting attire, the groom was established by the populations of Nikki-Wenu as Sounon Sero, King of Nikki.

=== Sime Dobidia, father of the dynasties ===
Sabi Sime, the youngest son of Sounon Sero, later became Sime Dobidia, and through marriages with the native clans Baatonu, Boko and Hausa, founded the dynasties of the Empire of Nikki. His sons, endowed with the royal emblems of trumpets and white spurs, took control of villages of their respective mothers. Those parental ties were the basis of the political structure established by the Wasangari.

The royal dynasties are founded by:

1. Sero Baguiri, the ancestor of the dynasty of the Karawe
2. Kpe Gounon Kaba Wouko, the ancestor of the dynasty of the Gbassi
3. Sero Kpera I, the ancestor of the dynasty of the Makararou
4. Kpe Lafia Gamabrou, the ancestor of the dynasty of Lafiarou
5. Sero Kora Bakarou, the ancestor of the dynasty of Korakou

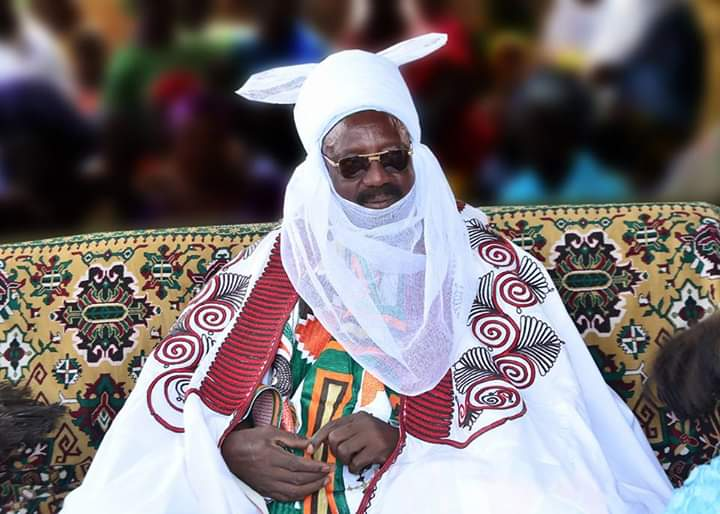
A Wassangari prince

== Society ==
=== Caste system ===
The Bariba society features the caste divisions typical of the West African region. There are caste divisions.

1. The Wassangari are the first component of the population. It is the aristocracy of the riders originating from Bussa. It's the caste of the nobles. The emperor or Sinaboko, as well as, the Gnon Kogui, the Queen Mother, take part of this caste. The Wassangari clan held political power in most of the Empire, the various dynasties of the Nikki Empire being placed under the authority of one of the Wasangari sub-clans.
2. After the Wassangari, come the Bariba natives or Baatonu natives who constitute the pure people. They are also farmers and artisans, they descend from pre-existing populations. They are still represented by "chiefs of land", the most notable of which, The Ministers and the Sinadunwiru, hold high office. They are members of the Council of Ministers and the second is called to the regency at the death of the King. The griots, several horsemen, blacksmiths, musicians and others Baribas take part integrally of this caste.
3. According to a Bariba custom, a child who is born abnormally or who goes out by the shoulder, or by the feet or other, or a child who pushes the teeth from the top is a child of misfortune. If he stays in the family, she will endure enough suffering through her fault. Instead of killing this child, he will be entrusted to the Fulbe who will be responsible for raising him until he grows up. In no case will he return to his family whether he is a prince's son or a peasant's son. And it is all these children who form the third component of the population, namely the Gando. The Gando are gathered in a neighborhood outside the city and do not have to marry Bariba. Marriages are between Gando except during a particular circumstance that we will explain later. The Gando are responsible for supplying the Royal Grain Court. The Gando are Baribas who talk the Fulfulde
4. The fourth caste is the caste of the Fulbe. The Baribas are excellent farmers and are closely linked to the Fulbe, who farm livestock on their territory. The Borgou, a region of wooded savannah alternating with vast plains irrigated by rivers, is an ideal location for the intensive livestock farm-ing carried out by the Fulbe, semi-nomadic Fula populations. The Baatonu allow the Fulbe to use pasture lands, particularly fallow or recently harvested land, and frequently entrust them with their own livestock in exchange for payment in meat and milk from the Fulbe; thus the populations cohabit in harmonious complicity. When visiting a village, the Fulbe, nicknamed Pullo by their hosts, are the guests of the Baatonu. The Fulbe are also represented at the court of the Baatonu chiefs who guarantee their protection against livestock pillaging. The Fulbe contribute to the Gaani economy by providing livestock and milk to their Emperor.
5. Finally, there are foreigners who are usually Muslims. Originally from northern Nigeria, the Hausa and the Dendi are traders and merchants.

== Culture ==
=== The origins of the Gaani ===
The yearly Gaani festival, presided over by the Emperor of Nikki, or in his absence the chiefs of the Bouay, Kika and Sandiro provinces, assembles all the provincial chiefs and their populations, who come to renew allegiance to the Emperor and receive his blessing. More than 150,000 persons converge to Nikki from all over to participate in the spectacular ceremony where the vitality of the Baatonu culture is celebrated and parental and fraternal links between dynasties are nurtured. Everyone brings presents, however modest, to contribute to the magnificence of the festivities. The Gaani is the second festival in the Baatonu calendar, following the fire festival or Donkonru, that takes place at the New Year. The Gaani is associated with the notion of nasara, evoking joy, victory and freedom and is a time for ecstasy and communion. By animating and perpetrating the memories that unite them, it nourishes and re-news solidarity and fraternity within the Baatonu people, endorsing their values of welcome and sharing. An animistic tribal ceremony, it was later incorporated into the Muslim calendar and thus coincides with the Mawlid which is celebrated by Muslims to commemorate the birth of the Prophet. The festival is organized according to the lunar calendar and is always held on a Tuesday, Thursday, Saturday or Sunday; it cannot be held on any other day of the week.*

=== The Fantasia ===
The Fantasia, a traditional equestrian show, simulates military at-tacks. Initially practised in the Maghreb where it was also known as the “powder game” or “horse game”, the fantasia is an Arab - Turkish - Berber equestrian art tradition. Recorded since the 16th century, it was formally recognized in the 18th century and became a popular subject for artists from Delacroix to Orientalist painters such as Eugene Fromentin and Maria Fortuny. The horsemen, astride richly harnessed mounts and carrying rifles loaded with black powder, simulate a cavalry charge, the culminating point of which is the simultaneous shooting of their firearms. In some regions camels are used instead of horses and in others the attack is carried out on foot. The Baatonu have been featuring the fantasia for the Gaani since the days of Sime Dobidia, as well as on the occasion of important events such as wed-dings, births and religious festivals. Due to increasing interest, demonstrations or parades in the equestrian tradition can also be organized for visitors

The horse, a central element in Baatonu tradition, is a prevailing symbol of the Empire, and festivals are greatly enhanced by their presence. The majestic horses’ harnesses and richly-coloured riders’ costumes are meticulously prepared several months in advance. The horsemen, mainly from the class of the dignitaries, compete in dexterity and audacity in powerful demonstrations of strength and mastery with their audacious stunts and dazzling processions. The equestrian tradition began when Sunon Sero, a resident of Nikki-Wenu, rode to Nikki on horseback to visit his son Sime Dobidia during the Gaani. Sime Dobidia established the tradition and transformed the Gaani into an equestrian demonstration assembling horsemen from throughout the empire.

=== Trumpets and drums, attributes of power ===
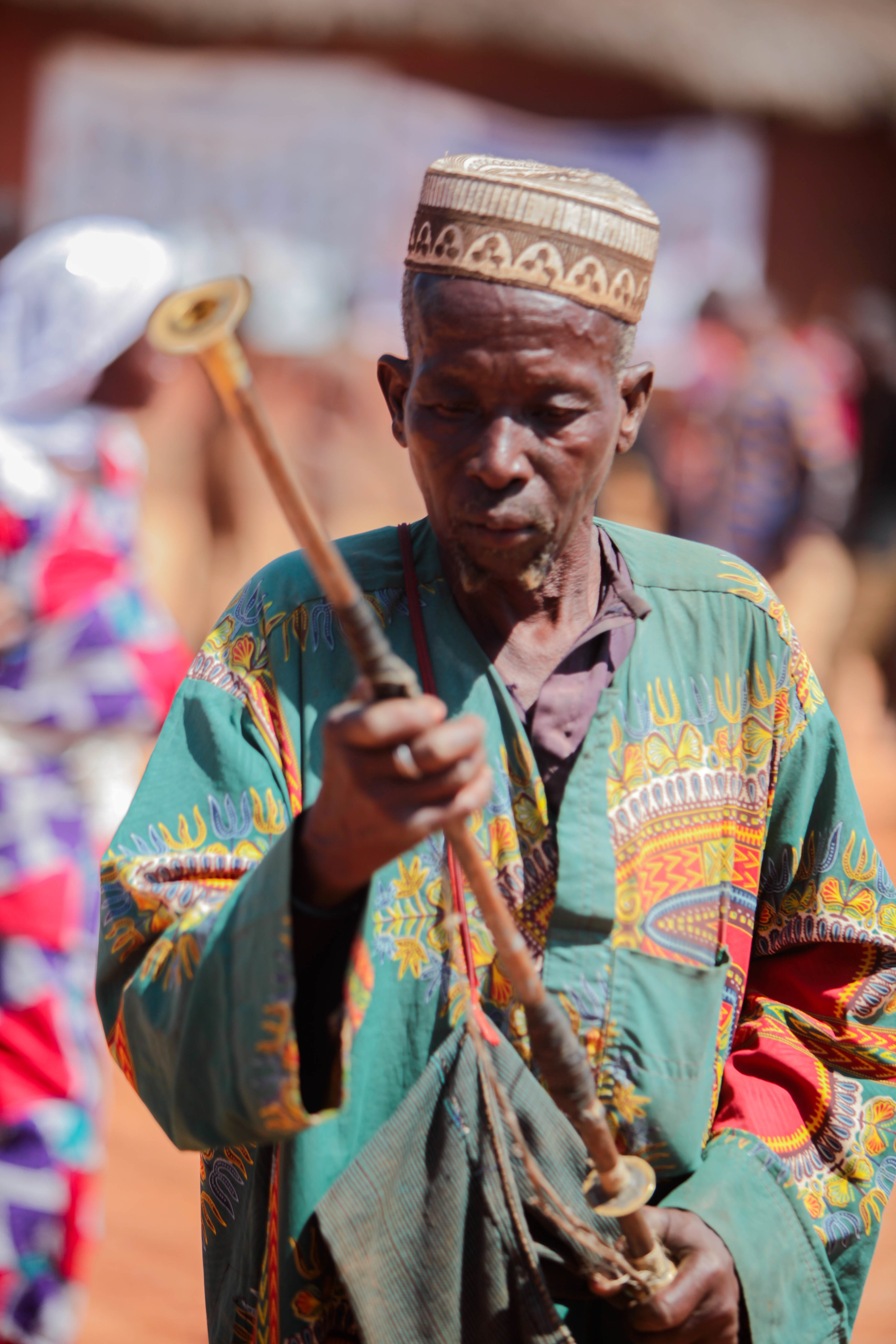
Kankangi player.

The sacred drums and royal trumpets symbolize the power of the Empire and are the embodiment of its memory and continuity. The dense, nonchalant sound of the drums and the suave timbre of the trumpets, as well as the myths the instruments perpetuate, accompany the Gaani festivities and resound in the hearts of the faithful throughout the year. To parade before the illustrious drums is a privilege granted by the clan. Two noteworthy sacred instruments are the imposing male and female sacred drums, the Barabakaru and the Barapiibu, which are between 125 and 127 centimetres high and made of baobab wood and beef hide. They are played at the Emperor's entrance by initiates and used during the Gaani, but also for other events during the year: enthronement, Friday prayers, etc. Another drum, the Bara Kaaru, which is still kept in a small temple on the Baro Kpira farm in the Banikuara region, is played by the Bara Yogo who is a member of the ancient family of griots.

Like spurs, trumpets were introduced to the Baatonu country by the Wasangari under the influence of the Hausa of Nigeria. The sacred trumpet is directly associated with power and is used by the Baatonu people in the royal courts of the Atacora, Donga and Borgou. Since all sacred instruments are the property of the king, only a few kings and chiefs have the privilege of owning one. Its manufacture and use are exclusive to initiated members of the royal court. The Kankangi ancestor of trumpeters was himself a member of the royal family. The Kankangi trumpet comprises two parts that fit together. The male trumpets are longer than the female ones (171 cm as opposed to 158 cm on average). The trumpets are played to the glory of the Emperor or to accompany his travels, but also to announce the holy day Friday and during grand ceremonies (Gaani or the Shaving of princes). Despite their sacred status, these trumpets are now reproduced in a somewhat anarchic manner.

=== Dress ===
The men's costumes are varied and indicate their social status. Their day-to-day outfit, the Turu, is a large ankle-length, generally sleeve-less tunic made from thick ecru cotton hessian. The knee-length Dansigi or shirt is sometimes used as an under-garment. The Sokoto or large-waisted tapered trousers, has a matching fabric belt. The ber-muda-style demberu is made from fabric for the Wasangari or animal skin for the hunters and farmers. Luxury attire for important days takes the form of the more elegant tako with its tasteful colours. A Tako-gonna, which is the same colour as guinea fowl, can be worth as much as three oxen. Generally speaking, the Baatonu favour dyed loincloths as opposed to the Fulbe who are happier wearing white loin-cloths, sometimes with brightly coloured stripes.

Fabric hats, whether ecru or brightly coloured, are primordial for the men; indeed, wearing hats in public used to be compulsory. The white Furogomba and the black-and-white Furogona are worn by princes and dignitaries. Dawani caps wrapped in long white or red turbans are used by Baatonu chiefs and Muslims. Furobakuro hats are worn by ordinary citizens, whereas village chiefs and horsemen have the privilege of wear-ing brimmed bowl-shaped or cone-shaped Keseru. The subtleties to wear-ing hats comprise a language unto itself. A hat folded at the front evokes a prince who aspires to a superior status. The braggart wears a mounted hat. A hat sitting on the back of the head indicates bravado: this man fears nothing and no-one! Ordinarily, the hat would sit on the right or the left.

Compared with the richness of the men's clothing, women's outfits can appear more modest, simply comprising a loincloth, skirt and head-scarf. The clothes correspond to their ages: young girls wear long loincloths or short skirts whereas married women wear two loincloths and a headscarf. Their relatively simple outfits are enhanced by the numerous items of jewellery acquired since the development of the caravan trade: earrings, silver bracelets, necklaces with carved porcelain or glass pendants and mirrors contribute to the women's style and seductiveness.

=== Songs and Dances ===
Singing is extremely important to the Baatonu and they have repertoires covering all aspects of daily life in the Empire. Wuru songs retrace the life of hunters and daily scenes, but can sometimes branch out into more erotic subject matter. Teke songs celebrate the typical values of Baatonu humanism and often use opposites to illustrate their messages – generosity and rapacity, bravery and cowardice, fidelity and infidelity, etc. – to encourage virtuous behaviour; thus, some of the songs are aimed at in-stilling a responsible attitude towards sexuality in young people, especially girls. Others accentuate courage and persistence when faced with an enemy.

The Wuru dance, which used to be performed during funeral ceremonies for native Baatonu families, remains a prestigious ritual dance also performed at popular celebrations. The dancers’ costumes, made from animal skins and native fabrics covered with several rows of cowrie shells and amulets, make quite an impression on the assembly, sometimes to the point of fright-ening them. The rapid pace of the dance is set by the pounding rhythm of their accessories: a gravel-filled gourd in one hand and a piece of animal skin in the other.

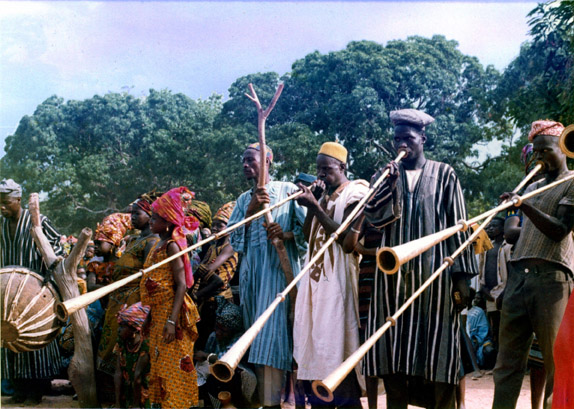
A group of Kirikou with trumpets, Kankangui

The popular Teke dance, which has no sacred function, is carried out by mature men using 40-centimetre cylindrical sticks. In this dance, rival groups or villages compete with each other. The Teke is danced in pairs and in general, six to eight couples confront each other on the floor. The many varying rhythms are associated with specific dance steps. The Sinsennu dance is carried out by young men. Its name refers to the chains of balls made from the leaves of Palmyra palm shoots decorated with small stones that the dancers wrap round their calves, making a sound similar to that of castanets. A flute, a talking tom-tom and a drum contribute to the sound of the Sinsennu, producing the particular harmony specific to the dance.

The Gbangba, danced by young Wasangari aged between 18 and 25, is identified by its solemn, mournful rhythm. It was for-merly used to announce the death of a king and to accompany the preparations for burial ceremonies. A war dance, it also an-nounces the start of a conflict. The Fulbe carry out the Sinna which imitates flagellation, and the Gesegesere.

=== Foods ===
Yams are the queen of cultures in Baatonu gastronomy. Their traditional dish is Sokuru, prepared from yams and served with different types of sauce: aubergine, bissap, Guinea sorrel, climbing leaves, beef, mutton or chicken. Yams are also eaten pureed (Pereku) or ground and dried (Yennu). The traditional dish of millet paste is now sometimes replaced by corn paste mixed with manioc. Manioc is also used to make gari. Although the Baatonu regularly consume corn and bean-based dishes in their daily life, they generally only sell Waakye (mixture of rice and beans).

== Gallery ==
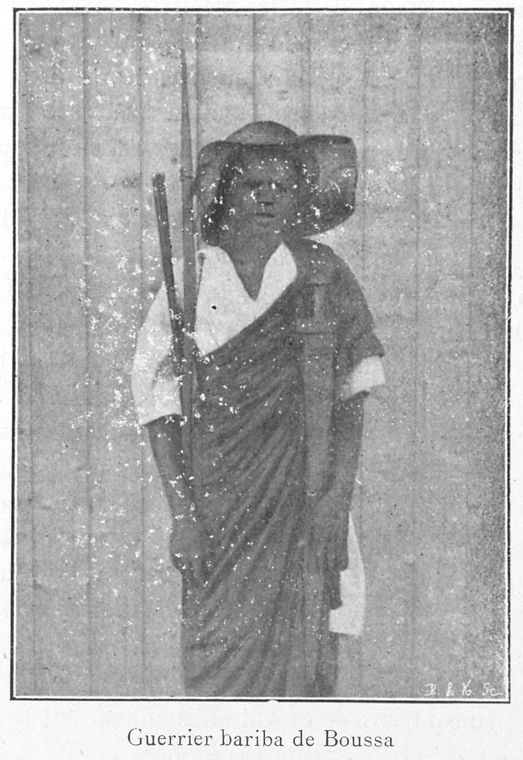
Bariba warrior, 1900.

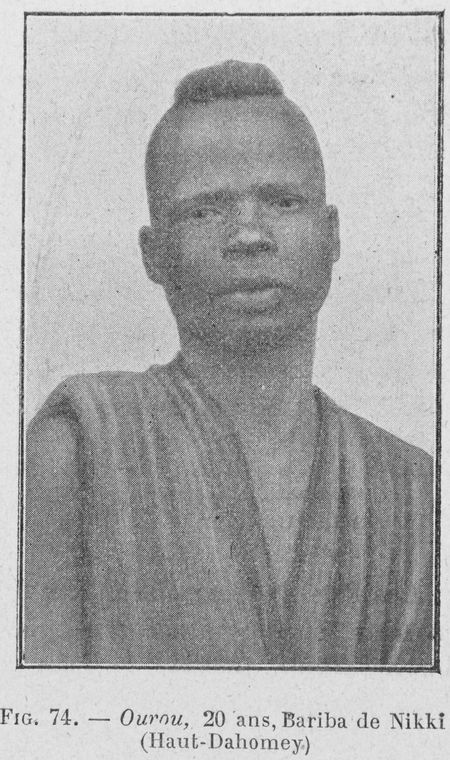
Ourou, a 20-year-old Bariba from the state of Nikki, 1920.

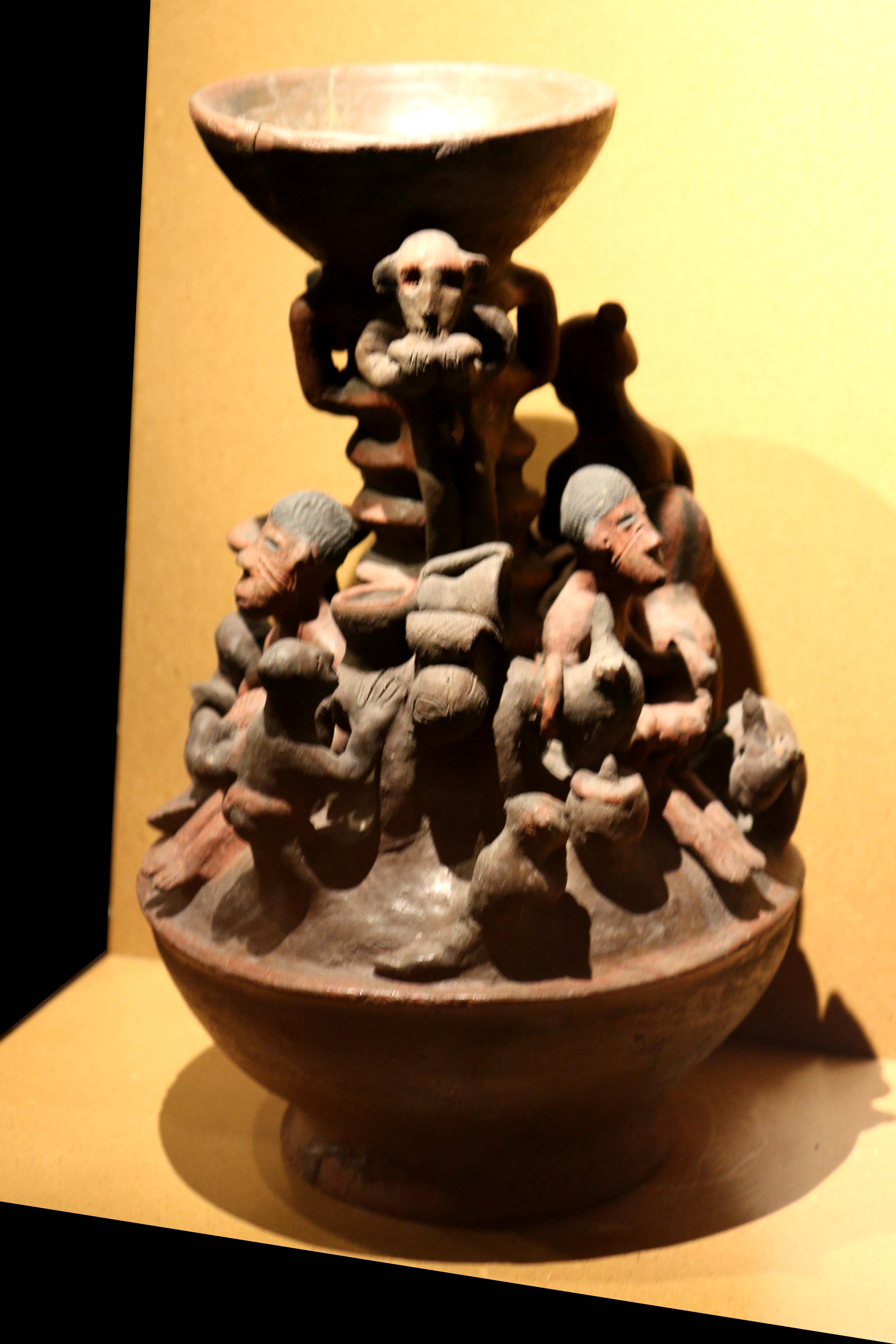
Ceremonial Bariba clay lamp.

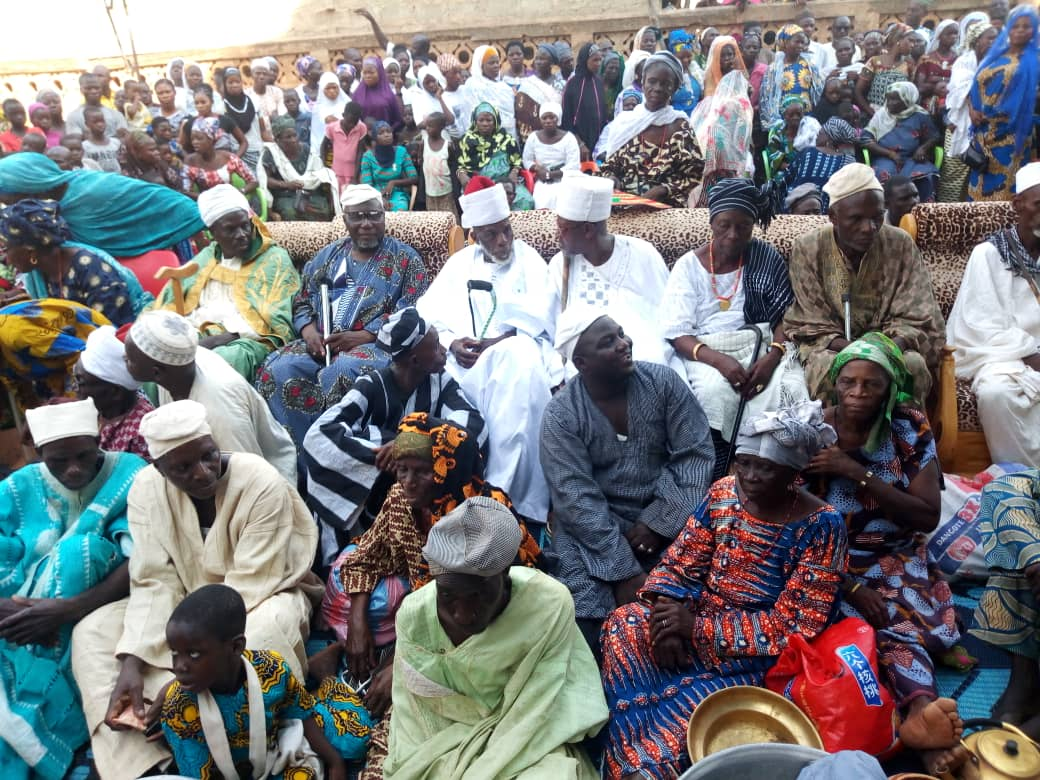
Delegates sitting during festival

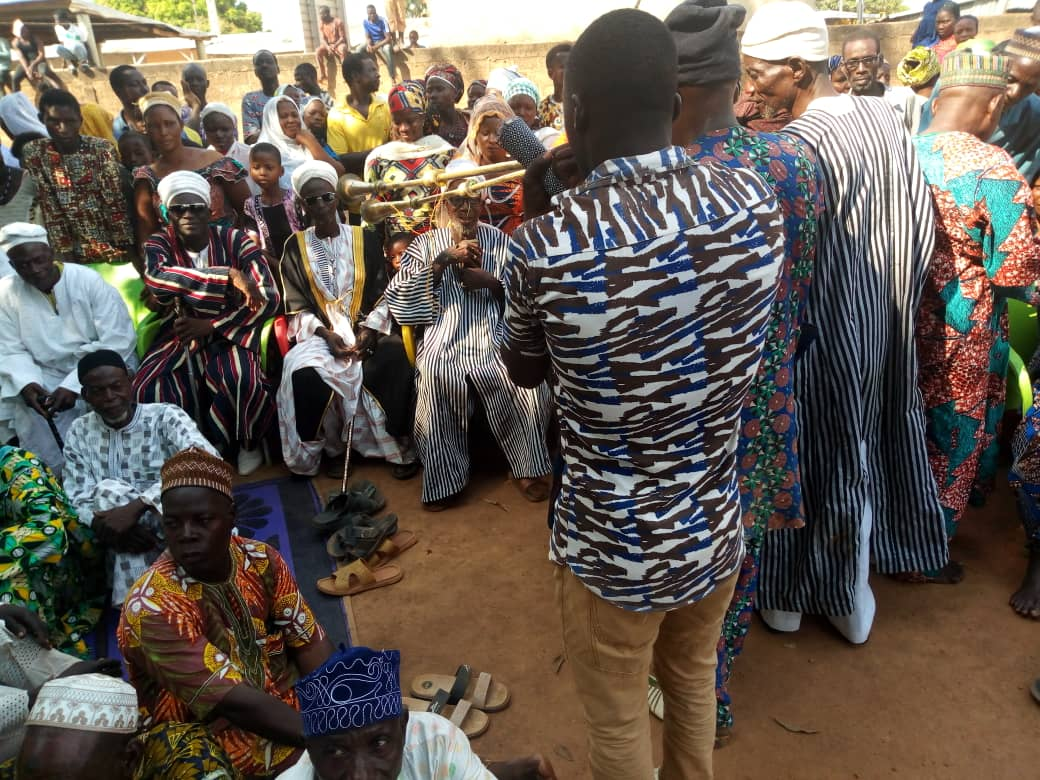
A group of Bariba

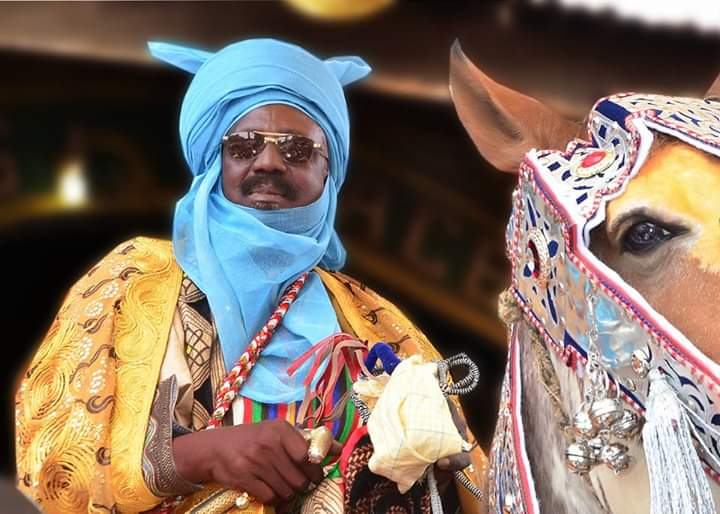
A Wasangari man

== Notable Bariba people ==
- Odo Chabi
- Steve Mounié
- Stéphane Sessègnon
- Farooq Kperogi

== See also ==
- Rulers of the Bariba state of Kwande
