= Anglo-French Convention =

Anglo-French Convention may refer to:

- Anglo-French Convention of 1882
- Anglo-French Convention of 1889
- Anglo-French Convention of 1898
- Anglo-French Convention of 1917
