= Borgu Emirate =

- Traditional state
- Location in Nigeria
- Coordinates: 9°53′N 4°31′E
- Country: Nigeria
- State: Niger State

The Borgu Emirate is a Nigerian traditional state with its capital in New Bussa, Niger State, Nigeria. The Emirate was formed in 1954 when the Bussa and Kaiama emirates were merged. These emirates, with Illa, were formerly part of the Borgu state, which was partitioned between the French colony of Benin and the British protectorate of Nigeria in 1898.

== Rulers ==
=== Bussa ===
A partial list of rulers of Bussa, who took the title Kibe, and later were also styled Sarkin Bussa (King of Bussa):

Start	End	Ruler
	1730	Kiseru Brodi
1730	1750	Yerima Bussa dan Kiseru Brodi
1750	1766	Kigera I dan Kiseru Brodi
1766	1791	Jibrim dan Yerima Bussa (d. 1791)
1791	1792	Yerima Ibrahim dan Jibrim
1793	1835	Kitoro Gani Zara dan Jibrim (d. 1835)
1835	1843	Kisaru Kisan Dogo dan Jibrim
1843	1844	Beraki dan Jibrim
1844	1862	Waruko Gajere dan Maikuka (d. 1862)
1862	1895	Kigera II Jibrim Dan Toro dan Kitoro (d. 1895)
1895	November 1903	Wuru Yaro Kisaru Kisan Dogo dan Kitoro (d. 1903)
19 December 1903	April 1915	Kitoro Gani Kilisha Yerima dan Dan Toro (1st time; see Bussa rebellion)
April 1915	19 April 1917	(occupied by Yawuri)
19 April 1917	Oct/Nov 1924	Jibrim dan Dan Toro
6 November 1924	21 August 1935	Muhammadu Kitoro Gani Kilisha Yerima dan Dan Toro (2nd time)
29 August 1935	1954	Wuru Babaki dan Dan Toro (regent to 17 September 1935) (d. 1968)
25 January 1937	1954	Muhammadu Sani (then ruler of Borgu)

=== Kaiama ===
A partial list of rulers of Kaiama, who were styled Sarkin Kaiama (King of Kaiama):

Start	End	Ruler
	7 October 1912	Mora Tasude
1912	Apr 1915	Jimi
1915	13 February 1917	Mashi
Apr 1917	1921	Yerima Kura
1921	1954	Haliru Kiyaru

=== Borgu Kingdom ===
Kings of Borgu since 1954, styled Sarkin Borgu:

Start	End	Ruler
1954	1968	Muhammadu Sani dan Dan Toro
1968	3 February 2000	Musa Muhammadu Kigera III dan Muhammadu Sani (d. 2000)
12 February 2000	26 February 2002	Isiaku Musa Jikantoro
26 February 2002	30 October 2015	Haliru Dantoro Kitoro III dan Muhammadu Sani (b. 1938)
11 November 2015		Muhammad Haliru Dantoro Kitoro IV (b. 1966)
