= List of public art in Cornwall =

This is a list of public art in the county of Cornwall, England. This list applies only to works of public art on permanent display in an outdoor public space. For example, this does not include artworks in museums.

Image	Title / subject	Location and coordinates	Date	Artist / designer	Type	Material	Dimensions	Designation	Wikidata	Notes
	Mercury	Mount Edgcumbe Country Park	Ancient Roman	Unknown	Statue on pedestal	Marble	Life size	Grade II		
	Wayside cross	Madron	Ancient (at least early medieval)			Granite	Approximately 1 metre			
	Artemis/Diana	Mount Edgcumbe Country Park		unknown		stone	Life size			
	Sir James Tillie	Beside Pentillie Castle, Pillaton	Late 17th century	unknown	Statue on plinth	Lead & stone		Grade II*		
	Jubilee Rock	Pendrift Common, Bodmin Moor	Decorated 1810	Lieut. John Rogers	Decorated rock	Granite		Grade II	Q26435200	Restored and amended 1859 and 1887
	Lander's Monument	Lemon Street/Falmouth Road, Truro	1852	Neville Northey Burnard	Statue on column	Granite		Grade II*	Q17533999	
More images	Humphry Davy	Market Place, Penzance	1872	T. & W. Wills	Statue on pedestal	Marble & granite	Life size	Grade II	Q26436847	
	Mary (mother of Jesus)	The Bidwell, Botusfleming	19th century in 14th century restored housing	Unknown	Statue in niche		Below life size	Grade II		
	Isambard Kingdom Brunel	below Royal Albert Bridge, Saltash	Early 20th century		Statue	Brass	Life size			
	Isambard Kingdom Brunel	below Royal Albert Bridge, Saltash	Early 20th century	After Carlo Marochetti	Bust on pedestal	Brass				
	Saint Winwaloe	Gunwalloe	Early 20th century			White stone	Life size			
	Monument to Penn Symons	Victoria Gardens, Saltash	1901	Alfred Drury	Relief panel on tapered column	Bronze and stone		Grade II		
More images	War memorial	The Strand, Newlyn	1920	Edward Prioleau Warren (architect) & Leonard Stanford Merrifield	Celtic cross with relief panel	Stone and bronze		Grade II	Q66478950	Monument designed by Warren with relief panel by Merrifield.
More images	War memorial	Boscawen Street, Truro	1922	Joseph Whitehead & Sons (sculptor)	Statue on pedestal	Bronze & granite		Grade II	Q26569911	
More images	Duke of Cornwall's Light Infantry memorial	Duke of Cornwall's Light Infantry Museum, Bodmin	Erected 1924	Leonard Stanford Merrifield	Statue on pedestal and steps	Bronze and granite		Grade II*	Q26585734	
More images	Richard Trevithick	S. Terrace/Cross St./Trevenson St., Camborne	1928	Leonard Stanford Merrifield	Statue on pedestal with plaques	Gilded bronze and stone	Below life size	Grade II	Q26647292	
	Armstrong memorial	Madron	1929		1929 sculpture group on 19th century chest	Granite		Grade II		
	Alice Winand Van Wulfften Palthe, died 1922	Church Square, Stratton	1920s or 1930s	Toma Rosandić	Statue on block	Bronze & stone	Life size	Grade II		
	Saint Michael	Trelissick Road, Hayle	1934	Unknown	Statue on base	Freestone statue & granite base	Life size	Grade II		
	Epidauros II	The Malakoff, St Ives	1961	Barbara Hepworth	Abstract sculpture	bronze				
	Dual Form	The Guildhall, St Ives	1965	Barbara Hepworth	Abstract sculpture	Bronze				
	Children	Tresco Abbey Gardens, Tresco, Isles of Scilly	1991	David Wynne	Sculpture group	Bronze	Life size	Grade I		
	Fisherman using rope to fish	Harbour promenade, Newlyn	Late 20th century			Brass/Copper	Life size			
	Grey seal	Pennyland Rocks, Harbour Entrance, Looe	20th century			Bronze	Life size			
	The Drummer	Lemon Quay, Truro	2011	Tim Shaw	Sculpture	Tin and copper	15ft tall			
	Ann Glanville	Saltash	2013		Seated statue	Fibreglass	Life size			

== See also ==
- Mount Edgcumbe Country Park — Over a dozen examples of what can be considered art rather than landscaping feature in the country park, including a triumphal arch and numerous decorative public garden ornaments.
- Stone crosses in Cornwall
