= Lander Brothers =

The Lander Brothers are:

- John Lander
- Richard Lander
