= 1992 Nigerian Senate elections in Niger State =

1992 Nigerian Senate election in Niger State

The 1992 Nigerian Senate election in Niger State was held on July 4, 1992, to elect members of the Nigerian Senate to represent Niger State. Haliru Dantoro representing Niger North, Dangana Ndayako representing Niger South and Ibrahim Kuta representing Niger East all won on the platform of the National Republican Convention.

== Overview ==
Affiliation	Party		Total
Affiliation	SDP	NRC	Total
Before Election			3
After Election	0	3	3

== Summary ==
District	Incumbent	Party	Elected Senator	Party
Niger North			Haliru Dantoro	NRC
Niger South			Dangana Ndayako	NRC
Niger East			Ibrahim Kuta	NRC

== Results ==
=== Niger North ===
The election was won by Haliru Dantoro of the National Republican Convention.

1992 Nigerian Senate election in Niger State
Party	Candidate	Votes	%
NRC	Haliru Dantoro		
Total votes			
NRC hold			

=== Niger South ===
The election was won by Dangana Ndayako of the National Republican Convention.

1992 Nigerian Senate election in Niger State
Party	Candidate	Votes	%
NRC	Dangana Ndayako		
Total votes			
NRC hold			

=== Niger East ===
The election was won by Ibrahim Kuta of the National Republican Convention.

1992 Nigerian Senate election in Niger State
Party	Candidate	Votes	%
NRC	Ibrahim Kuta		
Total votes			
NRC hold			
