= Bussa rebellion =

1915 rebellion in Nigeria

Coordinates: 10°19′N 4°36′E

- Part of World War I
| Date | June 1915 |
| Location | Bussa, British Nigeria |
| Result | British victory |

Belligerents
| British Empire: British Nigeria | Supporters of the Emir of Bussa |

Commanders and leaders
| (British Nigeria) District Officer Hamilton-Brown | Sabukki |

Units involved
| West African Frontier Force (WAFF); Nigerian police | Rebels |

Strength
| | 600 rebels |

Location of Bussa in Nigeria

The Bussa rebellion, also known as the Boussa rebellion, was a small insurrection in the town of Bussa against the policy of indirect rule in British-ruled Nigeria in June 1915. The rebellion was triggered by the British deposition of the local Emir of Bussa, Kitoro Gani, and his replacement with a Native Administration. The rebels attacked and killed around half of the members of the Administration, while the rest fled, leaving the rebels in control in Bussa. Despite the ongoing Kamerun campaign against the German Empire, the British were able to use a small force of soldiers which quickly suppressed the rebellion incurring no casualties. The Bussa Rebellion was the subject of a major work by British historian Michael Crowder.

== Background ==
During World War I, the increased demands on the colonial state, combined with its growing shortage of manpower, put strain on British and French colonial holdings in West Africa. Uprisings in British Nigeria and French Dahomey in particular served to "embarrass" European colonial powers and special precautions were taken to suppress them. Rebellions by the Egba people and the Iseyin were the cause of particular concern.

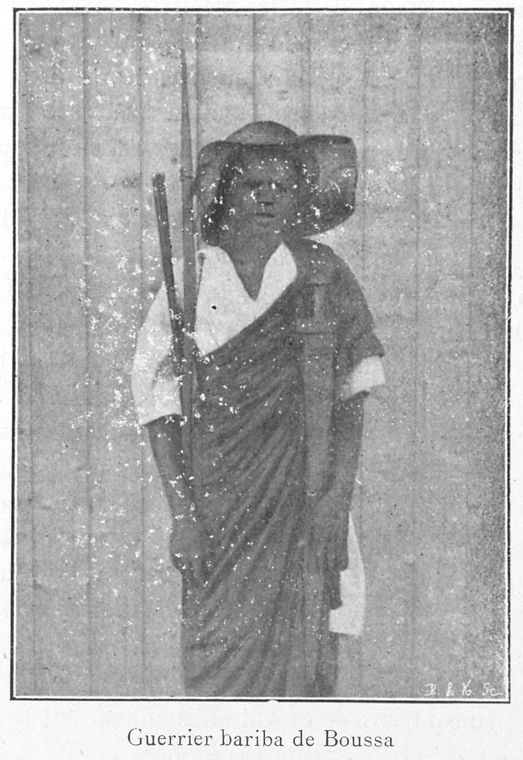
A Bussa warrior, photographed around 1900.

Bussa was located in Borgu Province, in the west of Northern Nigeria. Traditionally, Bussa had been part of the Borgu Emirate, but it had been conquered by the British and annexed into the Northern Nigeria Protectorate. Between 1912 and 1914, under the auspices of Frederick Lugard, Northern and Southern Nigeria were merged into a single Nigerian protectorate. Lugard was a chief proponent of allowing limited self-determination to local states, known as indirect rule, based on traditional tribal groups but within the aegis of general British control.

Lugard argued that where possible, pre-colonial aristocrats or kings should be retained as indirect rulers in British service to give greater legitimacy to the system. The hereditary emir of Bussa, Kitoro Gani, was judged to be a weak ruler who did not have enough influence to collect taxes or fill quotas of labourers to work on building railways. In 1912, therefore, the resident at Yelwa, A. C. Boyd, forced a major administrative reform on the Borgu Emirate which was divided up into administrative areas, each ruled by a beit-el-mal, or Native Administration. In Bussa, the Administration was put under the control of Turaki, a former royal advisor. Taxes were also raised.

== The Rebellion ==
The precise date of the start of the insurrection is unknown, but it occurred in early June 1915. A force of around 600 rebels, led by Sabukki, a local prince, occupied Bussa. The rebels were armed with bows and arrows and succeeded in capturing and killing half the members of the new Native Administration established just three months previously. The remaining members of the Administration fled the district. Although small, the rebellion caused panic because the British authorities were so short of troops.

=== Suppression of the Rebellion ===
The local British District Official, Hamilton-Brown, received news of the rebellion on 16 June. The fighting with German forces in the Kamerun campaign limited the forces which were at his disposal but Hamilton-Brown managed to levy a small force from the West African Frontier Force (WAFF) and the Nigerian police. The government force moved into Bussa and skirmished with the rebels, although no soldiers were killed and only 150 shots were fired. Sabukki fled to nearby French Dahomey but the rebellion did not spread into the French colony.

== See also ==
- Adubi War - a 1918 uprising in Nigeria
- African theatre of World War I
- Chilembwe uprising - a 1915 uprising against British rule in Nyasaland
- Women's War - a 1929 uprising by women in southern Nigeria against British-imposed Warrant chiefs

== Bibliography ==
- Crowder, Michael (1973). Revolt in Bussa: A Study of British 'Native Administration' in Nigerian Borgu, 1902–1935. London: Faber and Faber. ISBN 978-0-571-09395-3.
- Crowder, Michael, ed. (1978) [1971]. West African Resistance: The Military Response to Colonial Occupation. Hutchinson University Library for Africa (rev. ed.). Sydney: Hutchinson. ISBN 978-0-09-134031-5.
