= Lander's Monument =

Memorial in Truro, Cornwall, England

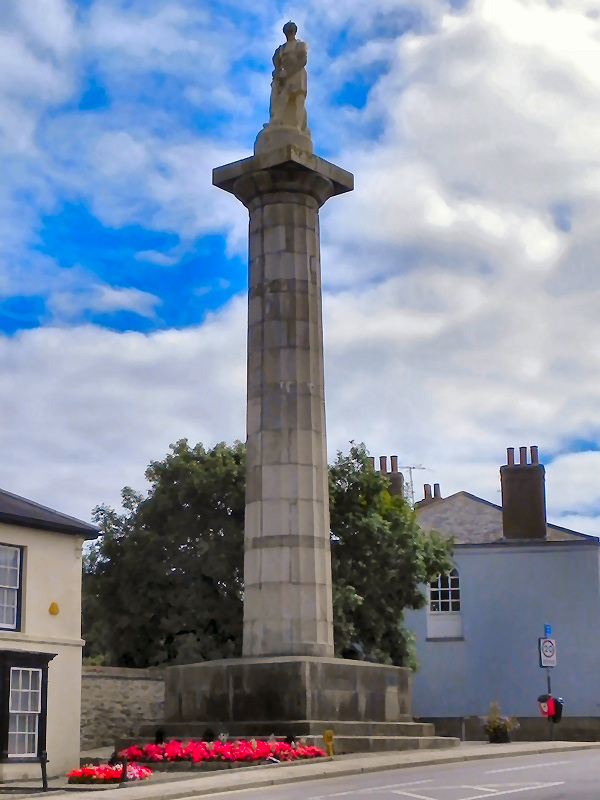

- Location within Cornwall
- 50.25938°N 5.05486°W
- Location: Truro, Cornwall, England

Listed Building – Grade II*
- Official name: Lander's Monument
- Designated: 29 December 1950
- Reference no.: 1282638

Lander's Monument is a memorial to Richard Lander on Lemon Street, in Truro, the county town of Cornwall in south west England. The monument is a grade II* listed building.

== Background ==
Richard Lander (1804–1834) was an explorer born and educated in Truro. At the age of 13, he was sent as a servant on an expedition to the West Indies. On his return to England, he served several wealthy families with whom he travelled in Europe. He assisted Major W. M. G. Colebrooke on an expedition to Cape Colony (in modern-day South Africa) in 1823, then Hugh Clapperton on an expedition to West Africa in 1825. They explored the lands around the Niger River until 1827, when Clapperton died. Lander made his way back to the coast and thence to England with Clapperton's papers. He published the papers largely unedited in 1829, along with his own journal, then in 1830 published an edited version in two volumes.

In January 1830, Lander and his brother, John, departed Truro on an expedition to find the source and trace the course of the Niger River. They reached Yelwa (in modern-day Nigeria) before navigating downstream in canoes, becoming the first Europeans to discover that the Niger drained into the Atlantic. Lander was awarded the Royal Geographical Society gold medal and the brothers' journals were published by John Murray to great acclaim, then translated into multiple languages. Richard died in 1834 from an infected gunshot wound sustained on another African expedition.

== Design and history ==
The monument consists of a tall Doric column by the architect Philip Sambell, completed in 1835, surmounted by a statue of Lander by the sculptor Neville Northey Burnard in 1852. The building work was executed by Bowden of Helston. The column is in dressed grey granite and stands on a substantial square plinth carved from ashlar. The site was donated by Sir Charles Lemon, a local public figure. The monument fell over in 1836, the year after its construction, but was repaired.

The monument is one of several to Lander. His wife and daughter erected a memorial in the Savoy Chapel in London, but this was destroyed by fire in 1864. The RGS paid for a stained-glass window as a replacement but this was destroyed by enemy bombing during the Second World War.
