= Borgu =

Region in Africa

- 15th century
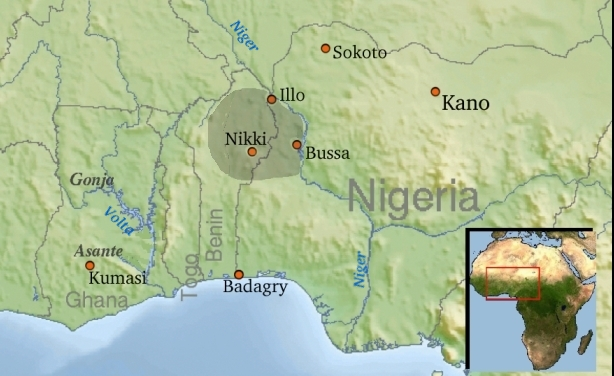
- Borguland
- Capital: Bussa (traditional); Nikki (political)
- Government: Confederation
- History
  - Established: 15th century
  - Anglo-French Convention of 1898: 14 June 1898
- Currency: Mithqal
Succeeded by
Northern Nigeria Protectorate; French Dahomey

Borgu is a region and former country split between north-west Nigeria and the northern Republic of Benin. It was partitioned between Great Britain and France by the Anglo-French Convention of 1898. People of Borgu are known as Bariba or Borgawa.

== History ==
=== Founding ===
According to the Kisra legend known all over Borgu, the petty kingdoms of the country were founded by Kisra, a hero who according to an oral tradition immigrated from Birnin Kisra ("the town of Kisra") in Arabia, but also claiming descent from Kanem-Bornu. Before his arrival, Borgu was politically unorganized. Local societies were organized by lineage, and villages rarely fought against one another. Kisra's sons are said to have been the founders of the main kingdoms of Borgu: Bussa, Illo, and Nikki. While the historicity of the Kisra legend is unclear, it likely commemorates an invasion and occupation of Borgu by horse-mounted warriors in the 15th century. The Kisra legend was an important cultural touchstone for these warriors and their descendants the Wasangari, reinforcing their claim to power and promoting the mutual cooperation and defense that underpinned the Borgu confederacy.

=== On the Defensive ===
Beginning in the late 15th century, the rising power of the Nupe people posed a serious threat to Borgu. When they crushed the neighboring Oyo, Alaafin Onigbogi found refuge in Borgu. His successor Ofinran founded a new Oyo capital at Igboho, but the two polities had forged a strong anti-Nupe alliance that became critical to Oyo developing a cavalry force.

Borgu was attacked by the Songhai emperor Sunni Ali in the 1490s, winning a crushing victory at Gwangwarake. Askia Mohammed I returned in 1505, perhaps with an eye to converting the stubbornly pagan Wasangari to Islam or controlling the developing Wangara-dominated trade routes. The campaign was a very difficult one; sources recall that the Songhai suffered serious defeats, but also briefly occupied Bussa and brought high-ranking captives back to Gao. In 1558 and 1563, Askia Daoud renewed the Songhai assault on Bussa, devastating the region.

=== Oyo Era ===
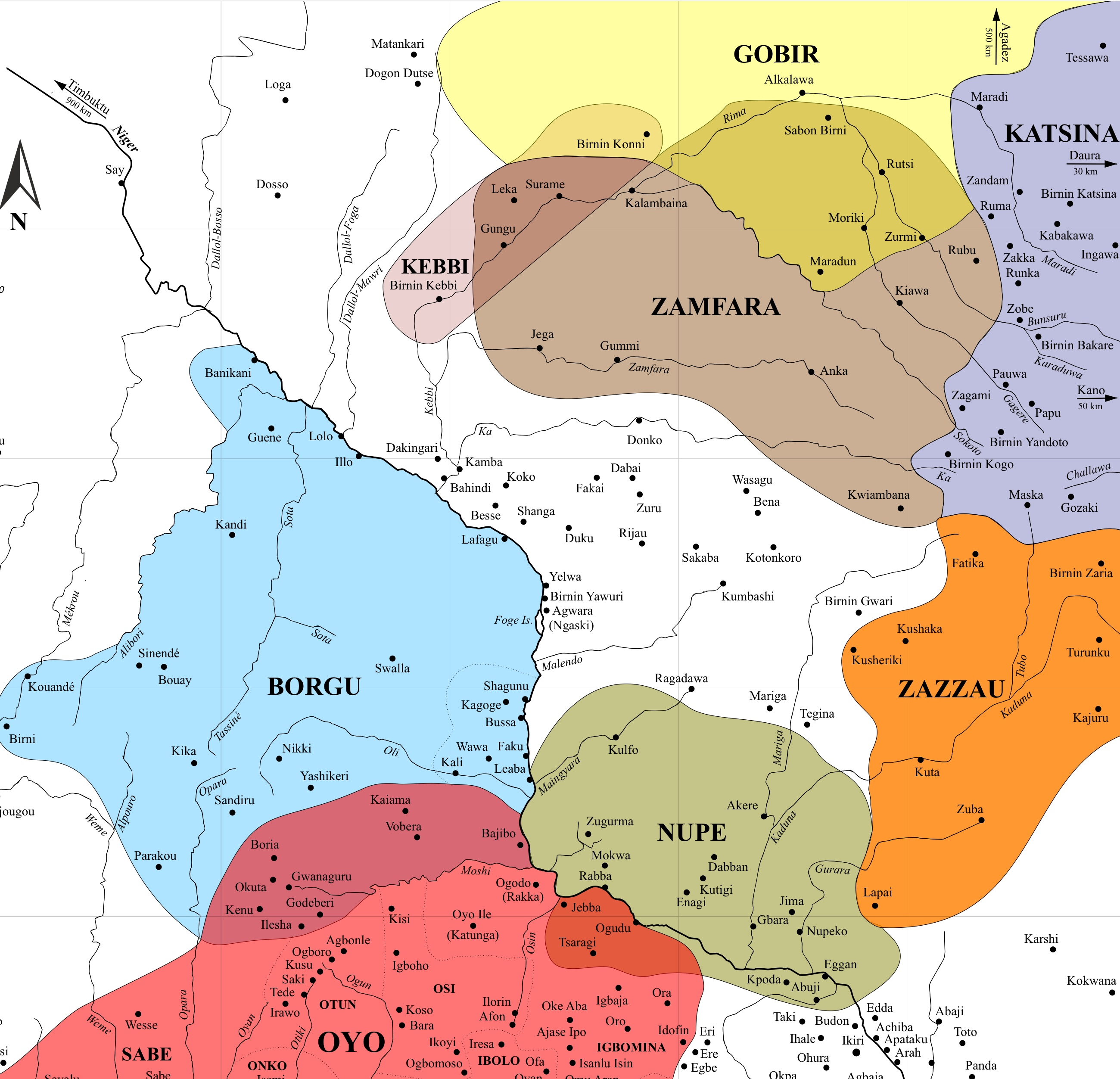
Map of Borgu and its neighbors in the late 18th-century

After the collapse of the Songhai Empire in 1591, Oyo turned against their former allies and reduced much of Borgu to vassalhood. This lasted until 1783, when Borgu regained complete independence by defeating Oyo at Gberegburu, although it continued to make tributary payments to the empire until 1818. In the mid 18th century Dahomey attacked Borgu but were repulsed.

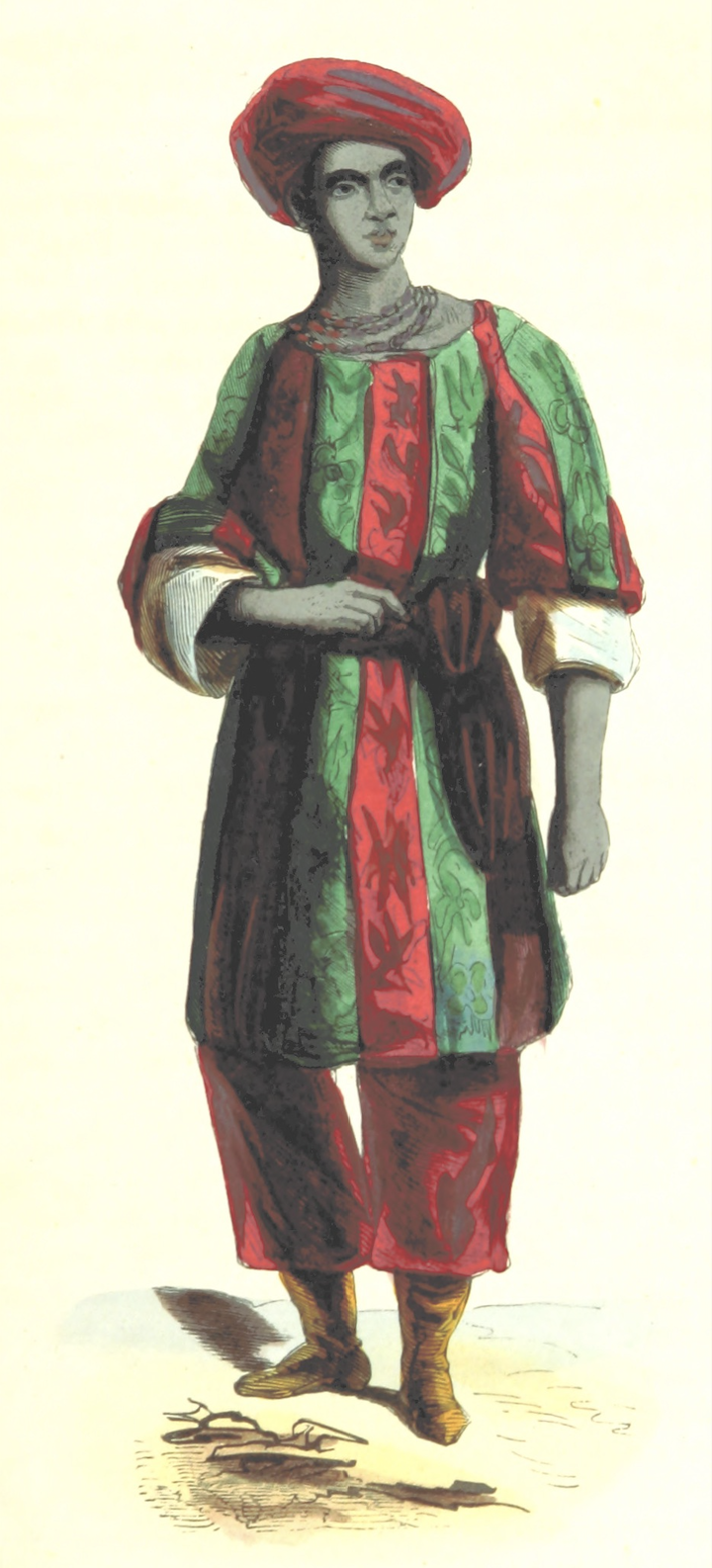
Hand coloured lithograph of the "King of Bussa" made by Auguste Wahlen in 1844

By the 1820s, Oyo was a shell of its former self. Fulani jihadists had taken control of Ilorin and ransacked the capital. Alaafin Oluewu looked to Borgu, which was also suffering raids, to join him in an effort to push back the Muslims. Siru Kpera, king of Nikki, led a strong Bariba contingent to war in 1837, and were met with initial success. But disunity amongst the Oyo contingents spelled disaster. Siru Kpera was killed, along with Alaafin Oluewu and the leaders of Wawa and Kaiama.

While Borgu did not ultimately fall to the Fulani, defeat did help fracture unity between the different Wasangari princes. Peripheral chiefdoms became increasingly powerful, appropriating trade revenues and raiding caravans indiscriminately. Foreign merchants, backed by their home countries, took control of trade routes. By the late 19th century the Bariba were divided and weak.

=== Colonial era ===
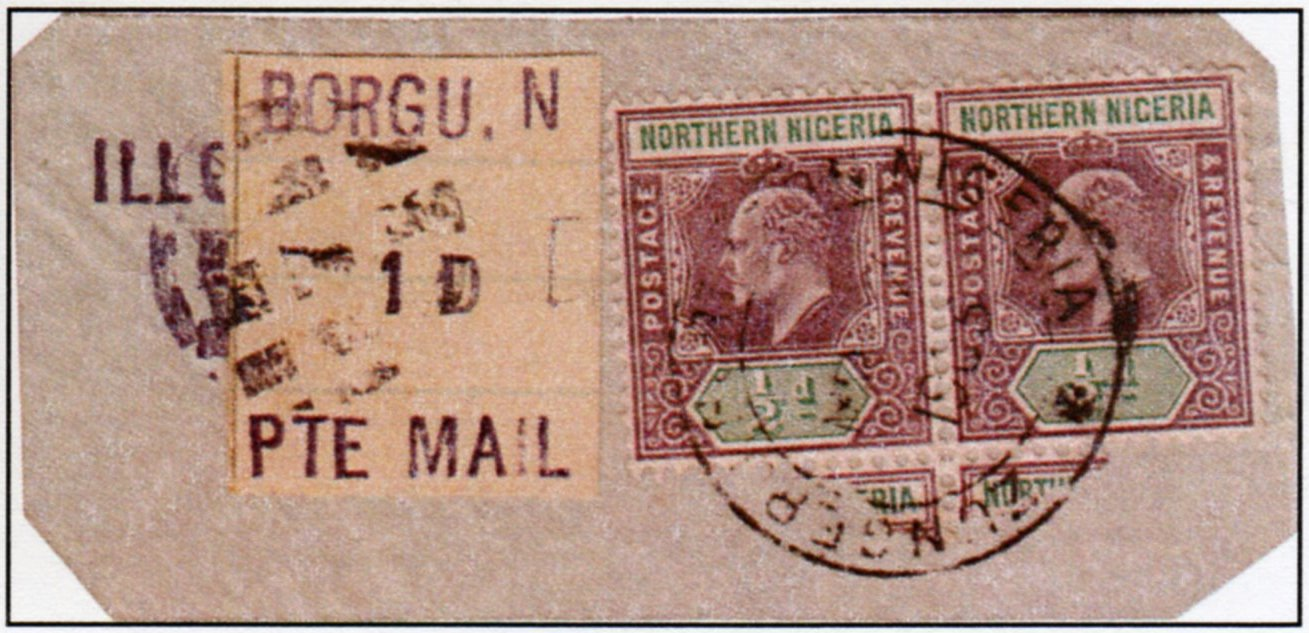
British colonial stamps for the Northern Nigeria Protectorate used at Borgu and Zungeru

When Great Britain and France penetrated the region in the late 19th century, they saw Borgu as an important strategic area. Although located within the territory claimed by the Royal Niger Company, the European nations' rivalry for control of the trade on the River Niger led to occupation of areas by the French, for instance at Illo, and the stationing of the British West African Frontier Force at Yashikera and elsewhere. With the 'Race for Nikki' in 1894, both Britain and France established treaties with the most powerful monarch in Borgu, who was soon overshadowed by colonial power.

The exact border between French and British spheres of influence was settled in 1898, dividing Borgu in two. The British half of Borgu became part of the Northern Nigeria Protectorate; the French half was joined to French Dahomey. British posts were established along the Niger River and at Jebba, Zungeru, Lokoja and Illo, and a mail route was established between them for communication with Britain.

== Government ==
Borgu was a confederation of kingdoms led by members of the Wasangari political class who came together for mutual defense. The three major kingdoms are Bussa, Illo and Nikki. Bussa is traditionally considered to be the spiritual centre of Borgu, Nikki the centre of political power and Illo the commercial emporium. Other Borgu states included Parakou, Kaiama, Kouande, Kandi, and Yashikeri. Bussa enjoyed a status as 'older brother' to the other Borgu rulers, but in practice only controlled some of its weaker neighbors. The unity of the federation was underpinned by the shared Kisra legend and the Gaani harvest festival.

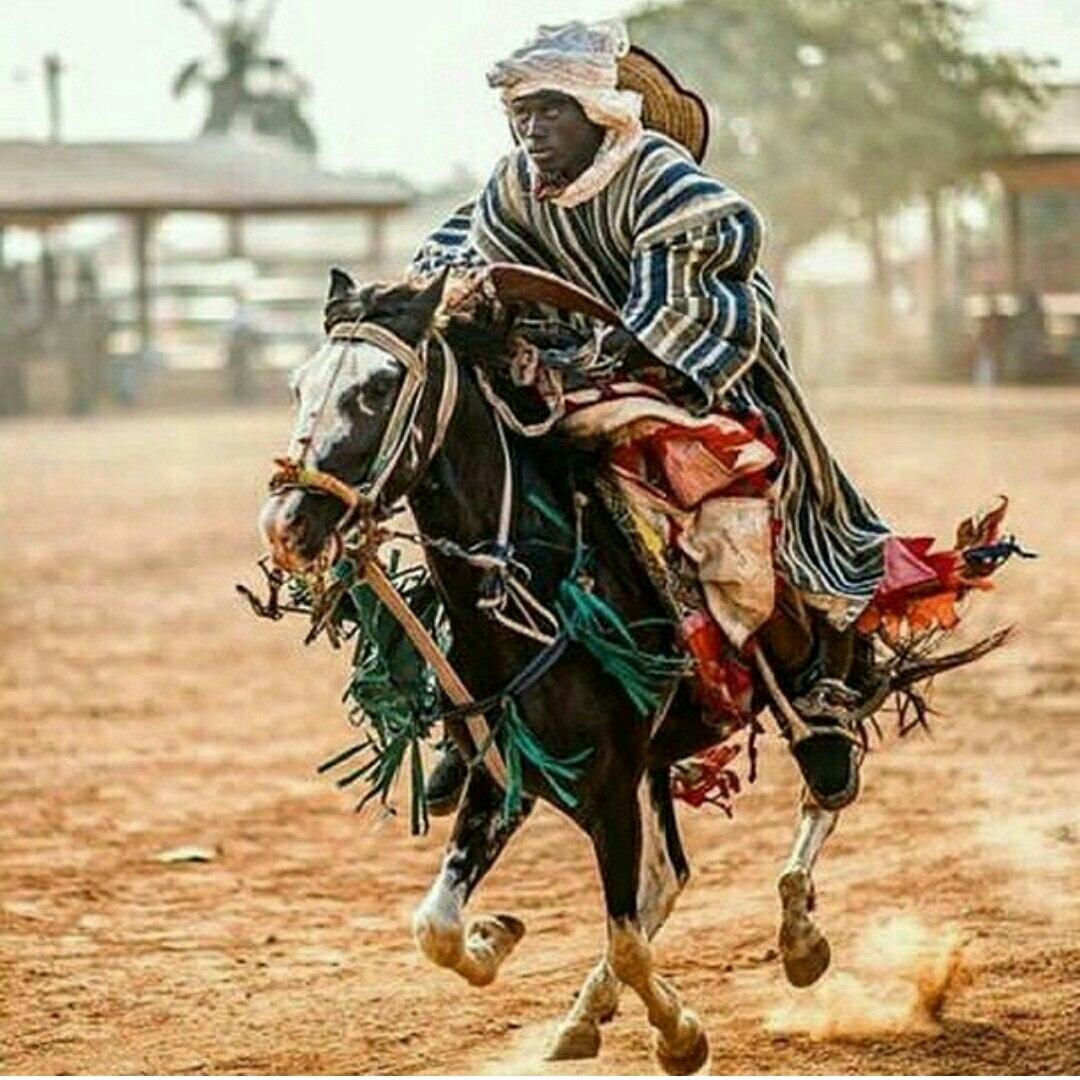
A Borgawa equestrian showcases his skills at the Gaani festival.

== Economy ==
The basis of the economy was agriculture, with yam and sorghum the staple crops. Beginning in the 16th century, however, Borgu became an important crossroads for trade routes bringing kola from Gonja and the Ashanti Empire to Hausaland, leading to the diversification and monetarization of the local economy. Trade was dominated by the Wangara, and relatively few Borgawa engaged in long-distance trade; until the increasingly insecure environment of the 19th century led to the Wangara's marginalization and the rise of a class of local women merchants.

== Religion ==
The Wasangari were historically committed pagans, reluctantly allowing the presence of the Muslim Wangara and never allowing them any political power. Only in 1920 did the first Wasangari prince, the Emir of Bussa, convert to Islam.

== See also ==
- Rulers of the Bariba state of Kwande

== References and sources ==
Sources

- Adekunle, Julius (1994). "Borgu and Economic Transformation 1700-1900: The Wangara Factor". African Economic History. 22 (22): 1–18. doi:10.2307/3601665. JSTOR 3601665.
- Adekunle, Julius (2008). "The Wasangari: Politics and Identity in Borgu". Anthropos. 3 (2): 435–445. JSTOR 40467422.
- Akinwumi, Olayemi (1999). "Oral Traditions and the Political History of Borgu". Anthropos. 4 (1): 215–221. JSTOR 40465704.
- Akinwumi, Ogundiran (2020). The Yoruba: A New History. Indiana University Press. ISBN 9780253051509.
- Gomez, Michael (2018). African dominion : a new history of empire in early and medieval West Africa. Princeton, NJ: Princeton University Press. ISBN 9780691177427.

Further Reading

- Kuba, Richard: Wasangari und Wangara: Borgu und seine Nachbarn in historischer Perspektive, Hamburg 1996.
- Lombard, Jacques: Structures de type féodal en Afrique noire: Étude des relations sociales chez les Bariba, Paris 1965.
- Stewart, Marjorie: Borgu and its Kingdoms, Lewiston 1993.
