= John Lander (explorer) =

English explorer of western Africa

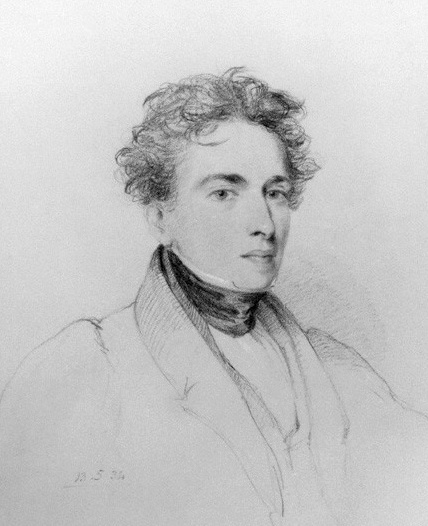
- Born: John Lander; 29 December 1806; Truro, Cornwall
- Died: 16 November 1839 (aged 32); 23 Wyndham Street, Bryanston Square, London
- Occupation: Explorer

John Lander FRGS (29 December 1806 – 16 November 1839) was the younger brother of English explorer Richard Lemon Lander and accompanied him on his second expedition to western Africa.

== Family ==
John Lander was the fourth son of John Lander, Truro innkeeper and noted wrestler, and Mary Penrose. While Richard went to sea at a young age, John was an apprentice in the printing trade. On his return from Africa he married Marry Livett in Truro. Four children survived infancy; their youngest daughter Emily, died 6 January 1880. He died of inflammation of the lungs, although it is alleged that he died of an illness contracted in Africa.

== Expedition ==
In 1830 the brothers went on an expedition to determine the course of the Niger River. They landed at Badagry in present-day Nigeria, took Clapperton's route to Bussa, then ascended the river for 160 kilometres before descending to explore the Benue River and the Niger Delta. They returned to Britain in 1831. Richard returned to the Niger in 1832, but John was employed in the custom house in Liverpool and later in London through the patronage of Lord Goderich, the president of the Royal Geographical Society.
