= Altarnun Wesleyan Chapel =

Church in Cornwall, England

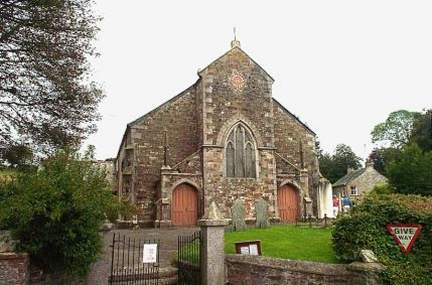

- Location within Cornwall
- 50.602584°N 4.5108634°W
- Location: Altarnun, Cornwall, England

Listed Building – Grade II
- Official name: Altarnun Methodist Chapel
- Designated: 23 November 1988
- Reference no.: 1142811

Altarnun Wesleyan Chapel is the former Methodist chapel in Altarnun in Cornwall. Completed in 1859, the chapel has been a Grade II listed building since 1988 and is now privately owned.

The chapel is built of snecked (the keying together of parallel courses of stone) local slatestone with granite dressings and a moulded plinth. The building has a slate roof with gable ends and is rectangular in shape with two entrances at the front set forward from the main building and each with lean-to roofs. The doors to these porches are 19th-century and are set in dressed granite four-centred arches. The left hand side of the building is rendered and the right side is hung with rag slates each with three square headed three-light windows.

Inside the 19th-century box pews originally had a raised central pew at the west end but which since has been removed. The 19th-century rostrum had a shallow niche to its rear with the text "Thy Word is God" inscribed. The Gothic organ case was Victorian while the partition fitted across the nave dividing the church in two was 20th-century work.

John Wesley often visited Trewint, lodging in Digory Isbell's home which is now a museum of Wesley and Methodism. The sculpted relief portrait of John Wesley over the doorway of the chapel was carved by the then 16 year-old Neville Northey Burnard who lived next door to the chapel.
