= Anglo-French Convention of 1889 =

Diplomatic agreement

The Anglo-French Convention of 1889 was a diplomatic agreement signed on August 10, 1889, between Great Britain and France, that delimited parts of their colonial boundaries in West Africa, notably between the British territory of the Gambia and the French colony of Senegal, and between Britain's Lagos Colony and French Dahomey. The Senegambian border was set at ten kilometers north and south of the river as far inland as Yarbutenda (near modern-day Koina, The Gambia), with a 10 km radius to mark the eastern border measured from the center of town. The British therefore controlled the river as far as it was navigable by sea-going vessels. Though widely seen as temporary at the time, this border set in 1889 has remained unchanged ever since.

== See also ==
- Anglo-French Convention of 1882
- Anglo-French Convention of 1898
- Entente Cordiale
- Proposed cession of the Gambia to France
