= Gani Festival =

Nigerian festival

Gani Festival or Sallar Gani
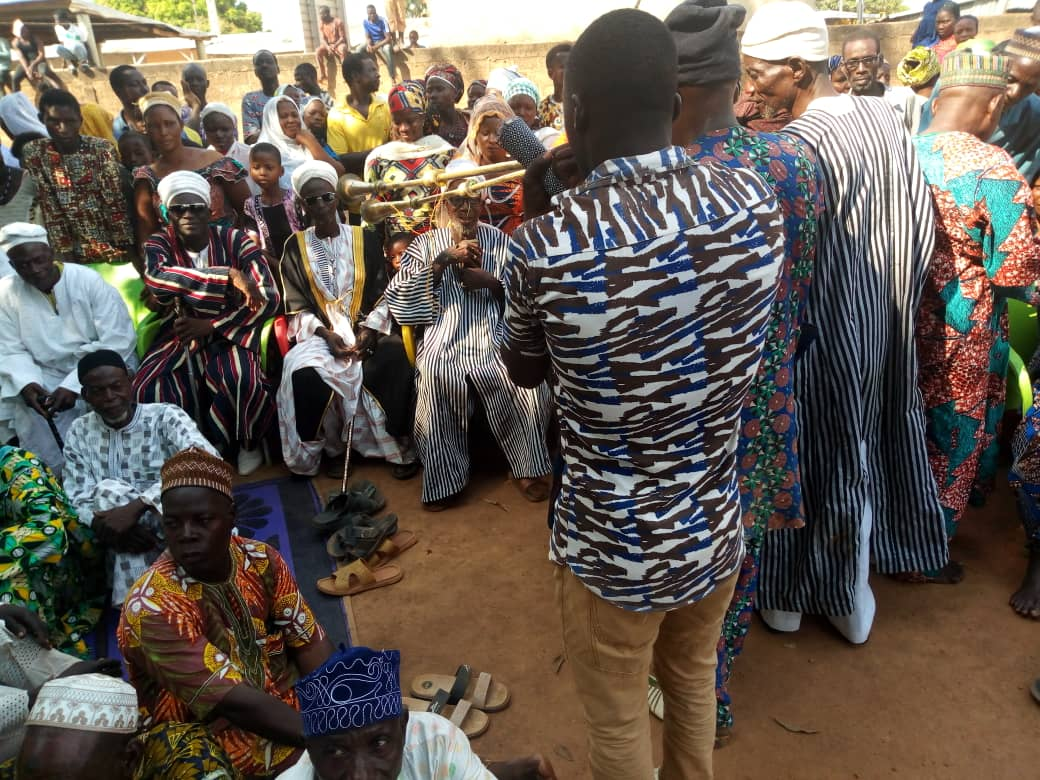
- Festival Gaani
- Language: Hausa

Origin
- Meaning: Local Wrestling
- Region of origin: Northern Region, Nigeria

The Gani Festival (Hausa: Sallar Gani) is an annual traditional festival celebrated mainly by four emirates in Northern Nigeria: Borno Emirate, Hadejia, Daura Emirate, and Gumel. This festival holds in the same way as Durbar festival of Eid al-Fitr and Eid al-Adha. The festival is held from the 12th of Rabi'al-Awwal every year in commemoration of the birth of Prophet Muhammad. Emir in company of his councils ride horses decorated with ornaments around the city. Members of the community also dress up in a special way on this day and make special food to share with family and friends. Hausa traditional music, encomium songs praising the Prophet, and dances are performed during the celebration. After the Durba, the king returns to the palace where he would be discussing with his cabinet on issues related to public affairs. The festival attracts the attention of tourists because it exhibits the culture of Hausas, Northern Nigeria and Africa.
