= Anglo-French Convention of 1882 =

1882 territorial settlement between the British and French colonies in West Africa

The Anglo-French Convention of 1882 was signed on 28 June 1882 between Great Britain and France. It confirmed the territorial boundaries between Guinea and Sierra Leone around Conakry and Freetown. However, it was never fully ratified by the French Chamber of Deputies although it was officially recognised by the British Foreign Office.

== See also ==
- Anglo-French Convention of 1889
- Anglo-French Convention of 1898
- Entente Cordiale
