= Hugh Clapperton =

British naval officer and explorer

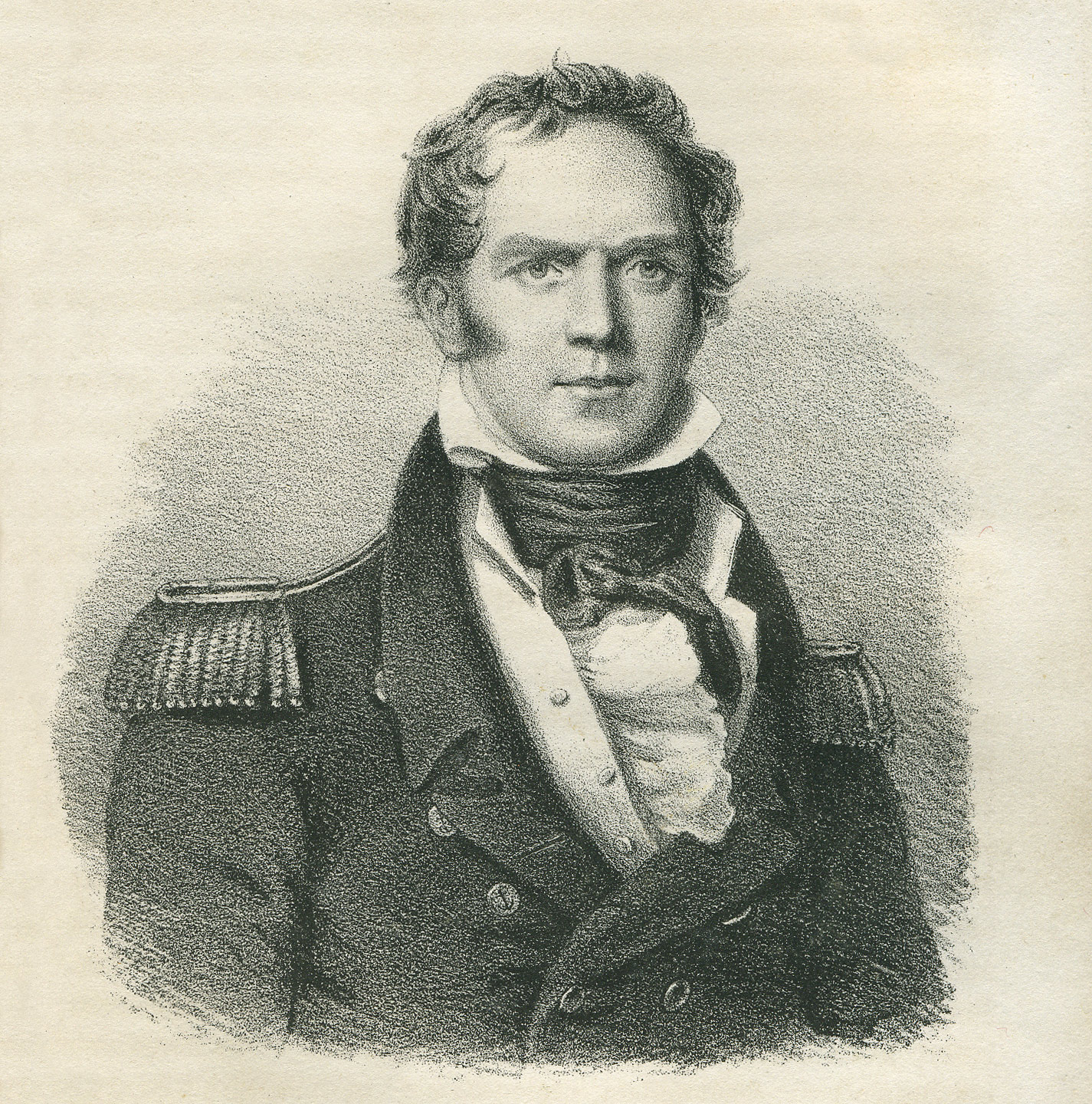
- An engraving by Thomas Goff Lupton from a picture by Gildon Manton (1828)
- Born: 18 May 1788; Annan, Dumfriesshire
- Died: 13 April 1827 (aged 38); Sokoto
- Known for: Exploration
- Parent(s): George Clapperton, Margaret Johnstone

Bain Hugh Clapperton (18 May 1788 – 13 April 1827) was a British naval officer and explorer of West and Central Africa.

== Early career ==
Clapperton was born in Annan, Dumfriesshire, where his father, George Clapperton, was a surgeon. He gained some knowledge of practical mathematics and navigation, and at thirteen was apprenticed on board a vessel which traded between Liverpool and North America. After having made several voyages across the Atlantic Ocean, he was impressed for the navy, in which he soon rose to the rank of midshipman. During the Napoleonic Wars he saw a good deal of active service, and at the storming of Port Louis, Mauritius, in November 1810, he was first in the breach and hauled down the French flag.

In 1814 Clapperton went to Canada, where he was promoted to the rank of lieutenant, and to the command of a schooner on the Canadian lakes. In 1817, when the flotilla on the lakes was dismantled, he returned home on half-pay. In 1820 Clapperton transferred to Edinburgh, where he made the acquaintance of Walter Oudney, who aroused his interest in African exploration.

== African exploration ==
After lieutenant G. F. Lyon had returned from an unsuccessful attempt to reach Bornu from Tripoli, the British government determined on a second expedition to that country. Walter Oudney was appointed by Lord Bathurst, then colonial secretary, to proceed to Bornu as consul, accompanied by Hugh Clapperton. From Tripoli, early in 1822, they set out southwards to Murzuk, where they were later joined by Major Dixon Denham, who found both men in a wretched condition. They eventually proceeded south from Murzuk on 29 November 1822. By this time, a deep antipathy had developed between Clapperton and Denham, Denham secretly sending home malicious reports about Clapperton having homosexual relations with one of the Arab servants. The accusation, based on a rumour spread by a disgruntled servant dismissed by Clapperton for theft, was almost certainly unfounded, and Denham later withdrew it but without telling Clapperton he had done so, leading the historian Bovill to observe that 'it remains difficult to recall in all the checkered (sic) history of geographic discovery.... a more odious man than Dixon Denham'.

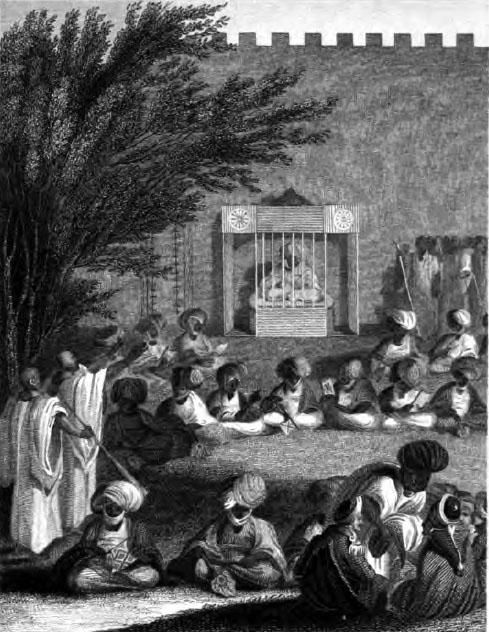
Denham and Clapperton received by Sheikh al-Kaneimi at Kuka

On 17 February 1823, the party eventually reached Kuka (now Kukawa in Nigeria), capital of the Bornu Empire, where they were well received by the sultan Sheikh al-Kaneimi, having earlier become the first white men to see Lake Chad. While they were at Kuka, Clapperton and Oudney parted company with Denham on 14 December to explore the course of the Niger River. Denham remained behind to explore and survey the western, south and south-eastern shores of Lake Chad, and the lower courses of the rivers Waube, Logone and Shari. However, only a few weeks later, Oudney died at the village of Murmur, located near the town of Katagum on the road to Kano. Undeterred, Clapperton continued his journey alone through Kano to Sokoto, the capital of the Fulani Empire, where by order of Sultan Muhammed Bello he was obliged to stop, though the Niger was only a five-day journey to the west. Exhausted by his travels, he returned by way of Zaria and Katsina to Kuka, where Denham found him barely recognizable after his privations. Clapperton and Denham departed Kuka for Tripoli in August 1824, reaching Tripoli on 26 January 1825. Their mutual antipathy unabated, they exchanged not a word during the 133-day journey. The pair continued their journey to England, arriving home to a heroes' welcome on 1 June 1825. An account of their travels was published in 1826 under the title Narrative of Travels and Discoveries in Northern and Central Africa in the years 1822–1823 and 1824.

Immediately after his return to England, Clapperton was raised to the rank of commander, and sent out with another expedition to Africa, the sultan Bello of Sokoto having professed his eagerness to open up trade with the west coast. Clapperton came out on HMS Brazen, which was joining the West Africa Squadron for the suppression of the slave trade. He landed at Badagry in the Bight of Benin, and started overland for the Niger on 7 December 1825, having with him his servant Richard Lemon Lander, Captain Pearce, and Dr. Morrison, navy surgeon and naturalist. Before the month was out Pearce and Morrison were dead of fever. Clapperton continued his journey, and, passing through the Yoruba country, in January 1826 he crossed the Niger at Bussa, the spot where Mungo Park had died twenty years before.

== Death ==
In July, Clapperton arrived at Kano and thence the Fulani capital Sokoto, intending to continue to Bornu and renew his acquaintance with the Kanuri leader Sheikh al-Kaneimi. However, the Fulani were now at war with al-Kaneimi, and Sultan Bello refused him permission to leave. After many months' detention, afflicted by malaria, depression, and dysentery, Clapperton died, leaving his servant Lander the only survivor of the expedition. Lander returned to the coast, and at Fernando Po by extraordinary coincidence met Clapperton's old antagonist, Dixon Denham, who duly relayed the news of Clapperton's demise to London.

== Legacy ==
Clapperton was the first European to make known from personal observation the Hausa states, which he visited soon after the establishment of the Sokoto Caliphate by the Fula. In 1829, the Journal of a Second Expedition into the Interior of Africa, &c., by Clapperton appeared posthumously, with a biographical sketch of the explorer by his uncle, Lieutenant-Colonel S. Clapperton, as a preface. Richard Lander, who had brought back the journal of his master, also published Records of Captain Clapperton's Last Expedition to Africa ... with the subsequent Adventures of the Author (2 volumes, London, 1830).

== Paintings and Engravings ==
Hugh Clapperton was painted in 1817 by Sir Henry Raeburn, the painting now residing in the United States. A later oil painting by Gildon Manton is held by the National Gallery of Scotland. The frontispiece to Clapperton's Narrative of Travels and Discoveries in Northern and Central Africa features an engraving by Thomas Goff Lupton.

== Works ==
- Clapperton, H. (1826). Difficult and Dangerous Roads – Travels in Sahara and Fezzan, 1822–1825. Eds. Bruce-Lockhart, J. & Wright, J. Sickle Moon Books, London. ISBN 978-1-900209-06-9
- Clapperton, Hugh; Lander, Richard (1829). Journal of a second expedition into the interior of Africa, from the Bight of Benin to Soccatoo by the late Commander Clapperton of the Royal Navy to which is added The Journal of Richard Lander from Kano to the Sea-Coast Partly by a More Easterly Route. London: John Murray.
- Denham, Dixon; Clapperton, Hugh; Oudney, Walter (1826). Narrative of Travels and Discoveries in Northern and Central Africa: In the Years 1822, 1823, and 1824 (2 volumes). London: John Murray. Scans: Volume 1, Volume 2
