= Illo =

Coordinates: 11.552°N 3.702°E

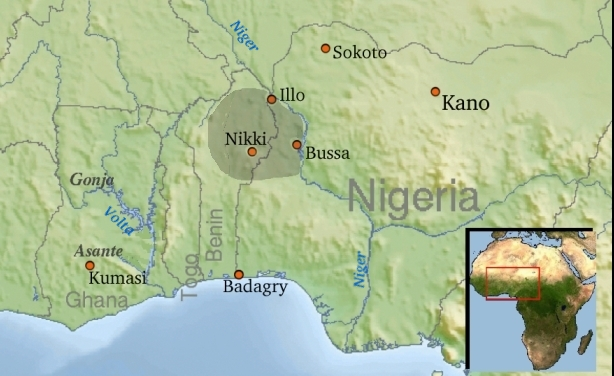
Location of Illo in the Borgu region.

Illo is a town in Kebbi State, Nigeria.

== Pre-colonial history ==
Illo was one of the Northern Borgu Kingdoms, small but wealthy, and it fought a number of wars with its neighbors in the nineteenth century including the Samba War and conflicts with Gwandu of the Sokoto Caliphate.

== Colonial era ==
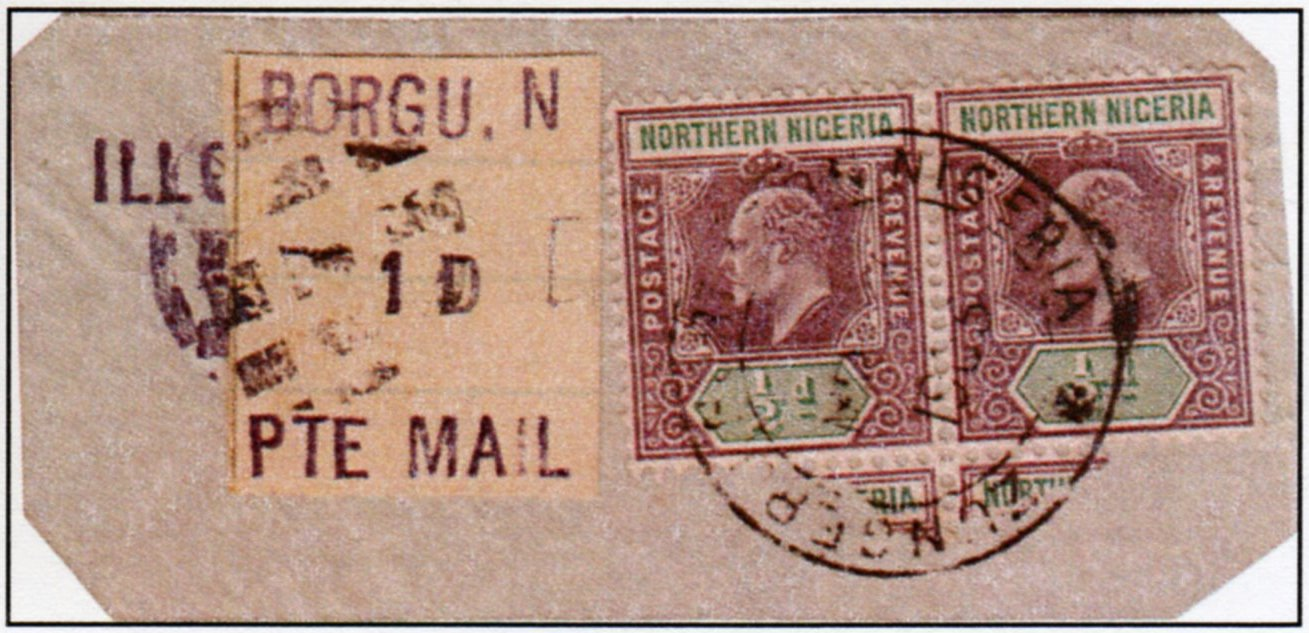
British colonial stamps for the Northern Nigeria Protectorate used from Illo.

In 1896 the French occupied Illo in response to the occupation of other towns in Borgu by the soldiers of the British West African Frontier Force. Both countries were vying for control of trade on the Niger River, but ultimately Illo fell into the British zone following the Anglo-French Delineation Agreement.

Later the British Government divided Nigeria into Northern and Southern Protectorates and Illo became part of the Northern Nigeria Protectorate. British posts were established along the Niger River and at Jebba, Zungeru, Lokoja and Illo, and a mail route was established between them for communication with Britain.
