= List of rulers of the Bariba state of Kwande =

This is the list of rulers of the Bariba state of Kouande.

== List of Rulers of the Bariba (Borgu) state of Kouande ==
Territory located in present-day Benin.

The king of Kouande is called "Bagana" meaning Bull.

Banga = Ruler.

Tenure	Incumbent	Notes
1709	Foundation of Kwanda state	
1790 to 1804	Woru Wari I Taburufa, Banga	
1804 to 1816	Woru Suru I Baba Tantame, Banga	
1816 to 1833	Soru I, Banga	
1833 to 1833	Bio Doko, Banga	
1833 to 1852	Buku Ya Dari Ginimu Siku, Banga	
1852 to 1883	Wonkuru Tabuko, Banga	
1883 to 1897	Woru Wari II, Banga	
5 March 1898 to 2 May 1904	Suanru, Banga	
May 1904 to February 1929	Gunu Deke, Banga	
9 December 1929 to 19 January 1943	Woru Suru II, Banga	
4 September 1943 to July 1949	Soru II, Banga	
1 January 1950 to 11 July 1957	Woru Wari III Tunku Cessi, Banga	
20 January 1958 to 1961	Imoru Dogo, Banga	

== See also ==
- Benin
- Bariba
- Bariba (Borgu) states
  - Rulers of the Bariba state of Kandi
  - Rulers of the Bariba state of Nikki
  - Rulers of the Bariba state of Paraku
- Lists of Incumbents
