= Neville Northey Burnard =

English sculptor (1818–1878)

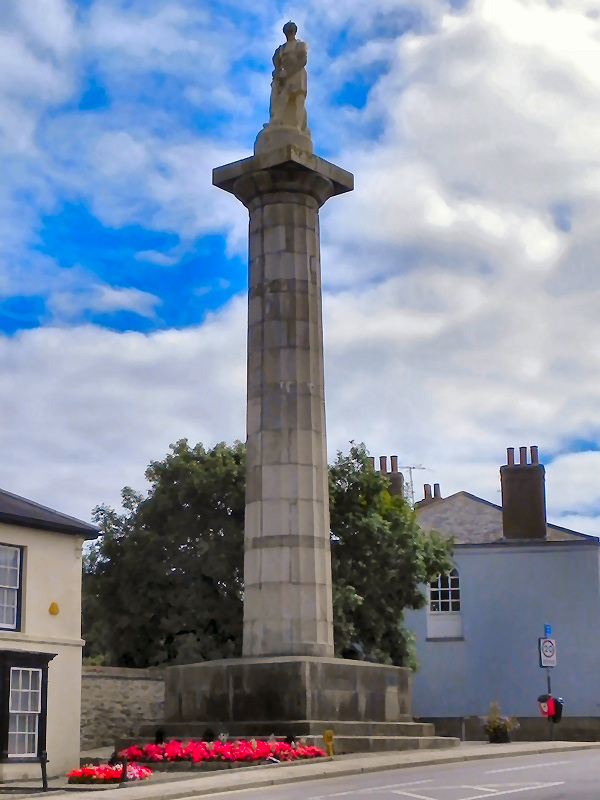
The Richard Lander Monument, Truro

Nevil or Neville Northey Burnard (11 October 1818 – 27 November 1878) was a 19th-century Cornish sculptor best known for his portrait figures.

== Life ==
Burnard was born in the village of Altarnun, on the edge of Bodmin Moor in Cornwall. He was the son of George Burnard, a local stonemason. He trained under his father and showed a talent from an early age. Aged sixteen years, he sculpted a relief portrait of John Wesley over the doorway of Altarnun Wesleyan chapel next to his home. He went on to win the Silver Medal of the Royal Cornwall Polytechnic Society for his group Laocoon and His Sons.

Around 1835 Sir Charles Lemon MP became his patron and took him to London where he persuaded Francis Chantrey to take him and train him further in his studio. Burnard exhibited at the Royal Academy from 1848 to 1873.

He became a celebrated society sculptor, was introduced to Queen Victoria, and his work was exhibited at the Royal Academy in London. He was in constant demand for public commissions, although he regularly returned to Cornwall. After turning to drink after the death of his daughter, he lost his wife and clients and returned to Cornwall permanently as a tramp. At one time he was reportedly discovered in a barn in St Cleer, where kindly folk looked after him until he went on the road again. He eventually died in Redruth Workhouse in 1878. He was buried in a pauper's grave in Camborne. In 1954 The Old Cornwall Society of Camborne erected a slate tombstone on his previously unmarked grave.

== Main works ==
Among his best known works are the statue of Richard Lander on the top of the Lander's Monument in Lemon Street, Truro, which he sculpted in 1852, (this has been the subject of much concern lately due to extensive erosion) and the memorial to Ebenezer Elliott in Sheffield (1854).

As well as many fine gravestones, he also sculpted busts of Richard Trevithick, (now in the County Museum and Art Gallery in Truro), Dr George Smith in Camborne's Wesley Chapel, and William Bickford-Smith, MP for Truro and Helston, now at Trevarno, Cornwall. Other examples of his work can also be seen in the Royal Cornwall Museum.

== Other works ==
- Bust of George Bellas Greenough in the Geological Museum in London (1859)
- Bust of Lord Macaulay in Westminster Abbey (1859)
- Bust of Richard Cobden (1866)
- Bust of William Thackeray in Plymouth Library (1867)
- Bust of Prof Edward Forbes (1867)
- Bust of Rt Hon John Bright (1869)
- Bust of William Gladstone (1871)
- Bust of Prince Albert for Truro Town Hall (1873)

== Recognition ==
Burnard is also the subject of a poem by fellow local and artist, the poet Charles Causley, 'A Short Life of Nevil Northey Burnard'; this poem can be read in the revised 2000 edition published by Picador of Causley's 'Collected Poems', pp. 133–5

== References and external links ==
- Jossie Marie's miscellany
- Rootsweb Cornish archives
- Altarnun
- Church memorials, The Benefice of Stithians
