= Haliru Dantoro =

Nigerian Emir and Politician (1938–2015)

Haliru Dantoro Kitoro III
- Emir Haliru Dantoro Kitoro III, Emir of Borgu Emirate
- Reign: 26 February 2002 – 30 October 2015
- Predecessor: Alhaji Isiaku Musa Jikantoro
- Successor: Alhaji Muhammad Sani Haliru Dantoro Kitoro IV
- Born: 1938; New Bussa, Northern Region, British Nigeria (now in Niger State, Nigeria)
- Died: 30 October 2015 (aged 76–77); Germany
- Dynasty: House of Gbemusu
- Religion: Islam

Haliru Dantoro Kitoro III (1938 – 30 October 2015) was a Nigerian traditional ruler and politician. He became Emir of the Borgu Emirate, a Nigerian traditional state located in Niger State, on 26 February 2002, following the overthrow of his predecessor, Alhaji Isiaku Musa Jikantoro. He served as Emir until his death on 30 October 2015.

== Life ==
Dantoro was born in 1938, the youngest of three children born to his parents, his hometown is New Bussa. He was active in the military administrations of Kwara State during Yakubu Gowon's government. Dantoro was a commissioner for Agriculture for a year and half and served briefly as Finance Commissioner for six months, thereafter he was posted as Commissioner of Trade until the 1975 July 29 coup that ushered in a new government. The next administration appointed him head of the board of The Herald, the state sponsored daily newspaper. In 1976, Dantoro was appointed chairman of the Niger River Basin Authority, a body to help farmers in Kwara, Niger and Kaduna States.

During the Second republic, he was a deputy chairman of Kwara State NPN, he also briefly served as Minister of the Federal Capital Territory in 1983 during the administration of President Shehu Shagari. However, his appointment as Minister of the Federal Capital Territory was abruptly ended by the Nigerian coup d'état in December 1983.

Dantoro also served as a Senator in 1992 as a member of the National Republican Convention, a former political party.

Emir Haliru Dantoro died at a hospital in Germany following a brief illness on 30 October 2015, at the age of 77.
