= Richard Lander =

British explorer

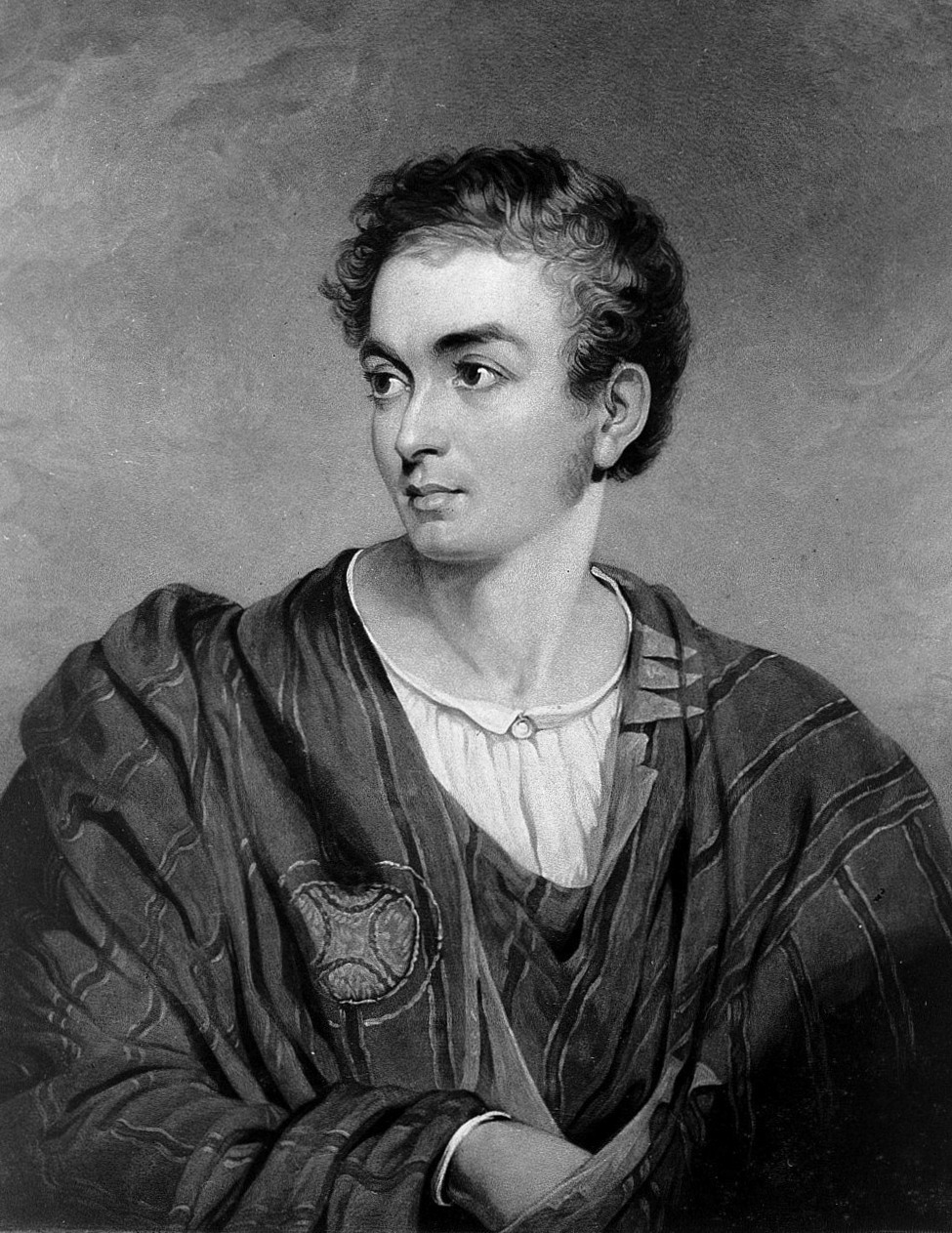
- Richard Lemon Lander
- Born: Richard Lemon Lander; 8 February 1804; Truro, Cornwall, England
- Died: 6 February 1834 (aged 29); Nigeria
- Cause of death: Injuries from a musket ball wound
- Occupation: Explorer

Richard Lemon Lander (8 February 1804 – 6 February 1834) was a British explorer of western Africa. He and his brother John were the first Europeans to follow the course of the River Niger, and discover that it led to the Atlantic.

== Biography ==
Richard Lander was the son of John Lander, a Truro innkeeper and noted wrestler, and was born in the Fighting Cocks Inn (later the Dolphin Inn). Educated at "Old Pascoe's" in Coombs Lane, Truro, until 1817 when, aged 13, he accompanied a merchant to the West Indies, where he suffered an attack of yellow fever in San Domingo. Returning home in 1818, he gained employment as a servant to several wealthy London families with whom he travelled in Europe.

Lander's explorations began as a servant to the Scottish explorer Hugh Clapperton with whom he went in 1823 to the Cape Colony, and then on to an expedition to Western Africa in 1825. Clapperton died on 13 April 1827 near Sokoto, in present-day Nigeria, leaving Lander as the only surviving European member of the expedition. He proceeded southeast to Kano and from there decided to travel south to Panda (misspelt Funda) on the Benue River which led him to becoming the first European to visit the important town of Zangon Katab whose people, the Atyap he described in his notes before returning through the Yoruba region to the coast and thence Britain in July 1828.

Commissioned by the British Government, Lander returned to West Africa in 1830, accompanied by his brother John. They landed at Badagri on 22 March 1830 and followed the lower River Niger from Bussa to the sea. After exploring about 160 kilometres of the River Niger upstream, they returned to explore by canoe the River Benue and Niger Delta. In the delta they were kidnapped by the locals at Aboh, and a large ransom was demanded by the local king Obi Ossai of Aboh kingdom, which was paid. The Lander Brothers were ransomed by Kingboy Amain, the heir to his father King Forday Kulo of Nembe Brass Kingdom, a Kingdom involved deeply in the oil palm trade and slave trade between the hinterland and critical to British interests, in present day Bayelsa State.

Kingboy Amain took them to Nembe and they arrived on Monday, 15 November 1830.

A few days later, on the 17th, Richard was taken to Akassa at the Nun estuary of the Niger River to persuade an English merchant Captain Luke, to repay the ransom along with other gifts paid by Kingboy Amain while John remained in Nembe between 17 and 23 November. John joined his brother Richard at the Nun estuary of the Niger at Akassa and subsequently sailed back to Britain.

The Lander Brothers admitted that the ransom was never paid back yet they were granted safe passage back to a British ship in their Journal despite the displeasure of Kingboy Amain in the Captain not repaying his money. He was instrumental in their safety and return.

Despite this setback, they were successful in determining the great river's course and termination. They travelled back to Britain from Fernando Po via Rio de Janeiro in 1831.

In 1832, Lander returned to Africa for a third and final time, as leader of an expedition organised by Macgregor Laird and other Liverpudlian merchants, with the intention of founding a trading settlement at the confluence of the Niger and Benue rivers, using two armed paddle steamers, the Quorra and the Alburkah. However, the expedition encountered difficulties, many personnel died from fever, and it failed to reach Bussa. While journeying upstream in a canoe, Lander was attacked by natives and wounded by a musket ball in his thigh. He managed to return to the coast but, the bullet being too deep to remove, gangrene set in, and he died. He was buried in the Clarence cemetery in Fernando Po. He was survived by his wife and daughter. According to a document in the John Holt papers in the Bodleian library (mss air s 1525 Box 11 folder3 p 8) the musket ball is in the Rotunda museum of artillery at Woolwich (Object Class XXX No 172 presented by Col Nichols RM, at whose house Lander died).

=== Legacy ===
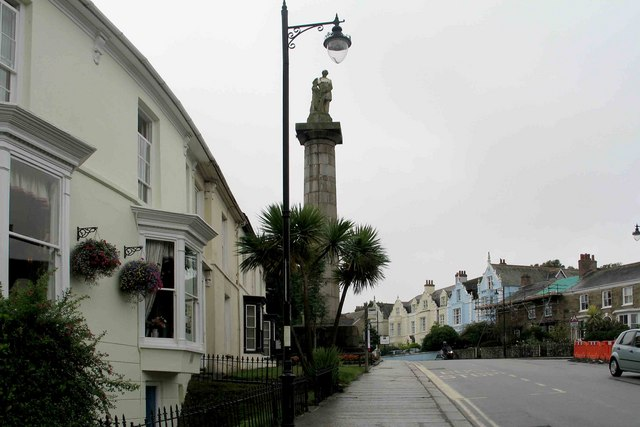
The Richard Lander Monument, Truro

In Truro, Lander's Monument by English sculptor Neville Northey Burnard stands at the top of Lemon Street, and Richard Lander School is named in his honour, as is housing estate Trelander which in Cornish means home or town of Lander.The building of the column commenced in 1835. In 1832 he became the first winner of the Royal Geographical Society Founder's Medal, "for important services in determining the course and termination of the Niger".

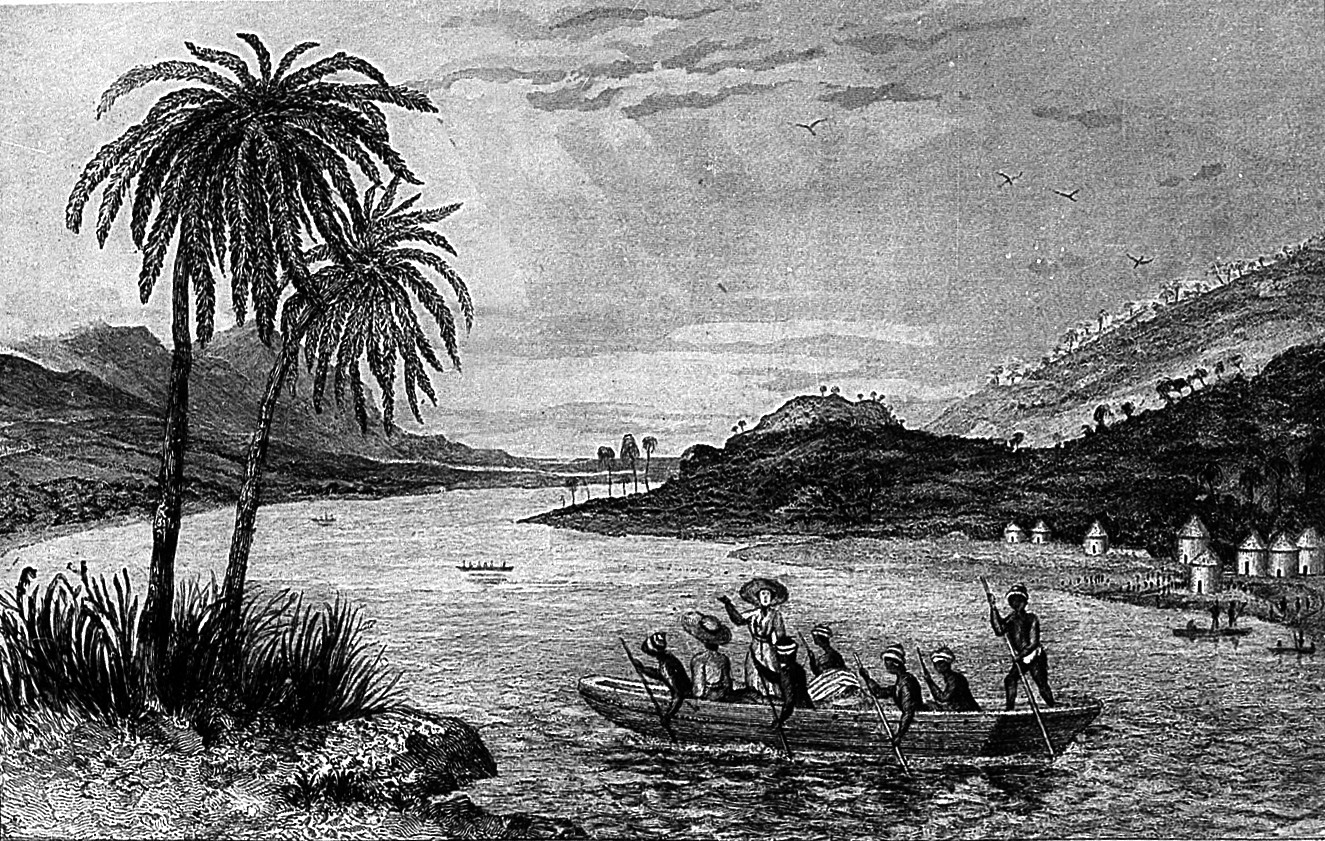
The Lander brothers travelling down the Niger

To mark the 200th anniversary of the birth of Richard Lander and celebrate the Lander brothers' achievements an "Expedition of Goodwill" was sent in November 2004 to retrace their river journey.

== Publications ==
- 1829: Clapperton, Hugh; Lander, Richard (1829). Journal of a second expedition into the interior of Africa, from the Bight of Benin to Soccatoo by the late Commander Clapperton of the Royal Navy to which is added The Journal of Richard Lander from Kano to the Sea-Coast Partly by a More Easterly Route. London: John Murray.
- 1832: Lander, Richard (1832). Journal of an Expedition to Explore the Course and Termination of the Niger. London: John Murray.

== See also ==
- List of explorers
- Explorations (disambiguation)
