= Anglo-French Convention of 1898 =

1898 treaty between Britain and France

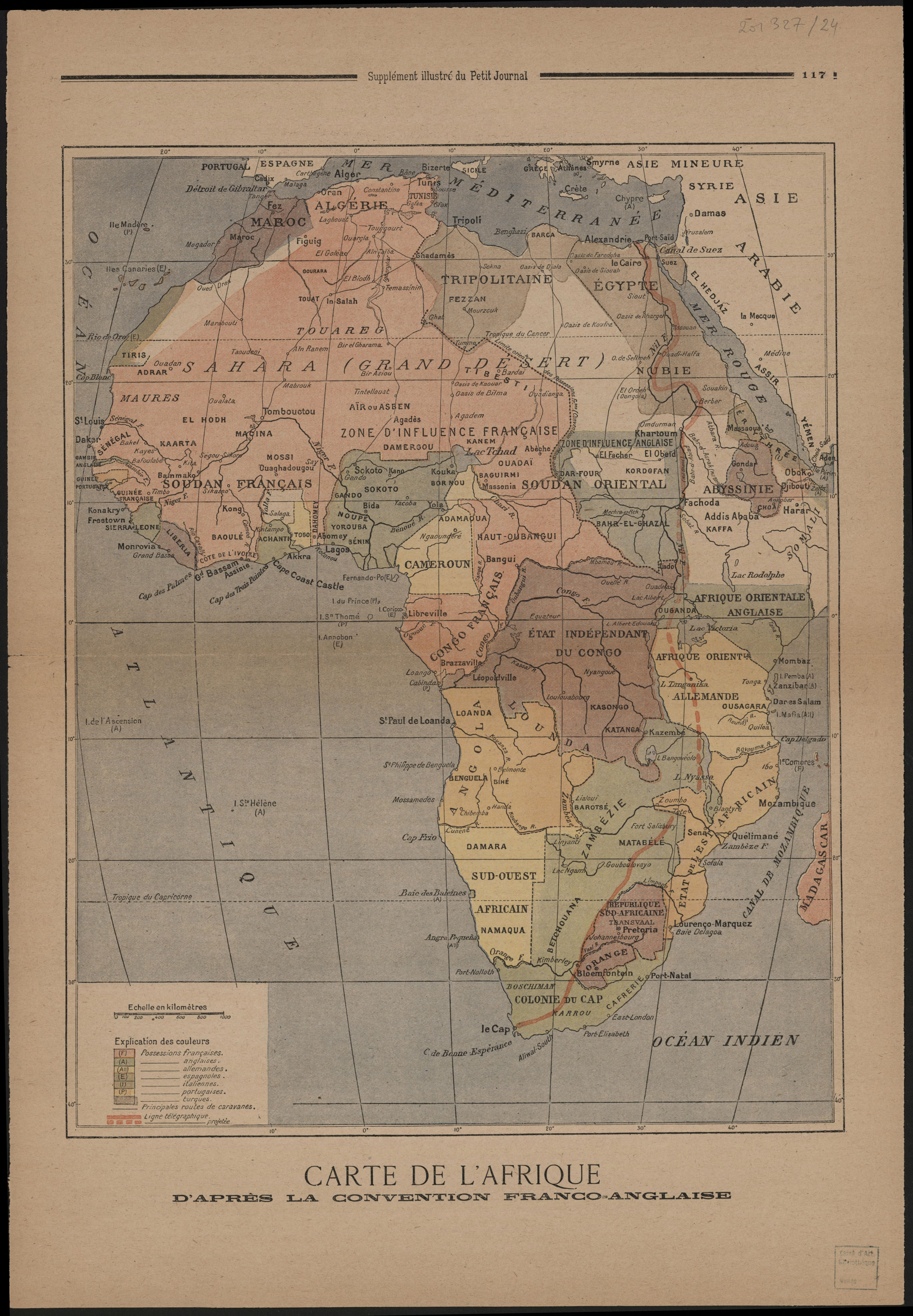
Map of Africa according to the Anglo-French convention.

The Anglo-French Convention of 1898, full name the Convention between Great Britain and France for the Delimitation of their respective Possessions to the West of the Niger, and of their respective Possessions and Spheres of Influence to the East of that River, also known as the Niger Convention, was an agreement between Britain and France that concluded the partition of West Africa between the colonial powers by finally fixing the borders in the disputed areas of Northern Nigeria. It was signed in Paris on 14 June 1898; ratifications were exchanged on 13 June 1899.

Article IV of this convention was completed by a declaration signed in London on 21 March 1899 that, after the Fashoda Incident, delimited spheres of influence in northern Central Africa and the Sudan.

== See also ==
- Anglo-French Convention of 1882
- Anglo-French Convention of 1889
- Entente Cordiale
