= Akinwumi Ogundiran =

- Born: 1966 (age 59–60)

Academic background
- Education: Obafemi Awolowo University; University of Ibadan
- Alma mater: Boston University
- Thesis: Settlement cycling and regional interactions in central Yorùbá-land, AD 1200-1900: archaeology and history in Ìlàrè district, Nigeria (2001)

Academic work
- Discipline: Archaeology & African History
- Institutions: Northwestern University

Akinwumi Ogundiran (born 1966) is the Cardiss Collins Professor of Arts and Sciences and Professor of History at Northwestern University. He is an archaeologist, anthropologist, and cultural historian, whose research focuses on the Yoruba world of western Africa, Atlantic Africa, and the African Diaspora. He was born in Ibadan, Nigeria, and migrated to the United States in 1993. He was Chancellor's Professor and Professor of Africana Studies, Anthropology & History at UNC Charlotte.

== Education ==
Ogundiran earned BA, First Class Honors from Obafemi Awolowo University in 1988, followed by an MSc from the University of Ibadan in 1991. In 2000, he completed his PhD at Boston University. His thesis was titled Settlement cycling and regional interactions in central Yorùbá-land, AD 1200-1900: Archaeology and history in Ìlàrè district, Nigeria.

== Career ==
Ogundiran worked as a newsroom editor at the Broadcasting Corporation of Oyo State (Nigeria) in 1991. He began his pre-doctoral teaching career in Nigeria at Delta State University and the University of Benin. His post-doctoral teaching took off in the Department of History at Florida International University, Miami. From 2008 to 2018, Ogundiran was Chair of the Africana Studies department at UNC Charlotte, where he was Chancellor's Professor and Professor of Africana Studies, Anthropology & History. He was appointed the Cardiss Collins Professor of Arts and Sciences and Professor of History at Northwestern University. His research addresses the archaeology of social complexity and cultural history in the Yoruba world of western Africa, especially questions of emergent communities, social complexity, and cultural history during the period 1000-1800 AD. Ogundiran has also facilitated collaborative research projects on the archaeology of Atlantic Africa and the African Diaspora. Other areas of work include Black Intellectual Thought, social sustainability, historiography, and cultural heritage.

From 1997 to 2000, Ogundiran directed the Eka Osun Project which studied regional interactions, historic landscape and social memory in Ilare District, Nigeria (1200–1900 CE). Between 2003 and 2011, he directed the Upper Osun Archaeological and Historical Project that investigates the cultural history of Atlantic Africa as experienced in the hinterlands of the Yoruba world, and the landscape history of the Osun Osogbo Sacred Grove. Most recently, he has been directing the Archaeology of Old Oyo Metropolis studying the political economy and social ecology of the Oyo Empire (1570-1836). His research has been funded by the National Humanities Center, the Wenner-Gren Foundation for Anthropological Research, the National Endowment for the Humanities, the American Philosophical Society, National Geographic, among others. In spring 2018, he was a Yip Fellow at Magdalene College, University of Cambridge.

Ogundiran has authored and edited several publications. These include Materialities of Ritual in the Black Atlantic which was named the Choice Outstanding Academic Title for 2015. His latest book is "The Yoruba: A New History" (Indiana University Press, 2020), winner of the 2022 Vinson Sutlive Book Prize and the Isaac Delano Prize in Yoruba Studies. He was awarded a Certificate of Special United States Congressional Recognition for Excellence in Service in 2007. In 2018, he received the Research Excellence Award from UNESCO-Affiliated Centre for Black Culture and International Understanding in Nigeria. He is the recipient of the 2021 First Citizens Bank Scholars Medal Award, UNC Charlotte's highest recognition for research excellence. Professor Ogundiran is a Fellow of the American Academy of Arts and Sciences, Fellow of the Nigerian Academy of Letters (FNAL), and Fellow of the Society of Antiquarians of London. He is also a member of Phi Kappa Phi.

He served as editor-in-chief of the journal African Archaeological Review in 2019-2023, and President of the Society of Africanist Archaeologists, 2023-25.

== Selected publications ==
- Archaeology and History in Ilare District, 1200-1900 (Cambridge Monograph in African Archaeology 55, 2002)
- Precolonial Nigeria (Africa World Press, 2005)
- Archaeology of Atlantic Africa and the African Diaspora (Indiana University Press, 2007)
- Power and Landscape in Atlantic West Africa (Cambridge University Press, 2012)
- Crises of Culture and Consciousness in the Postcolony: What is the future for Nigeria? (Institute of African Studies, University of Ibadan, Nigeria, 2012).
- Materialities of Ritual in the Black Atlantic (Indiana University Press, 2014)
- The Yoruba: A New History (Indiana University Press, 2020)
