= Bussa, Nigeria =

Bussa
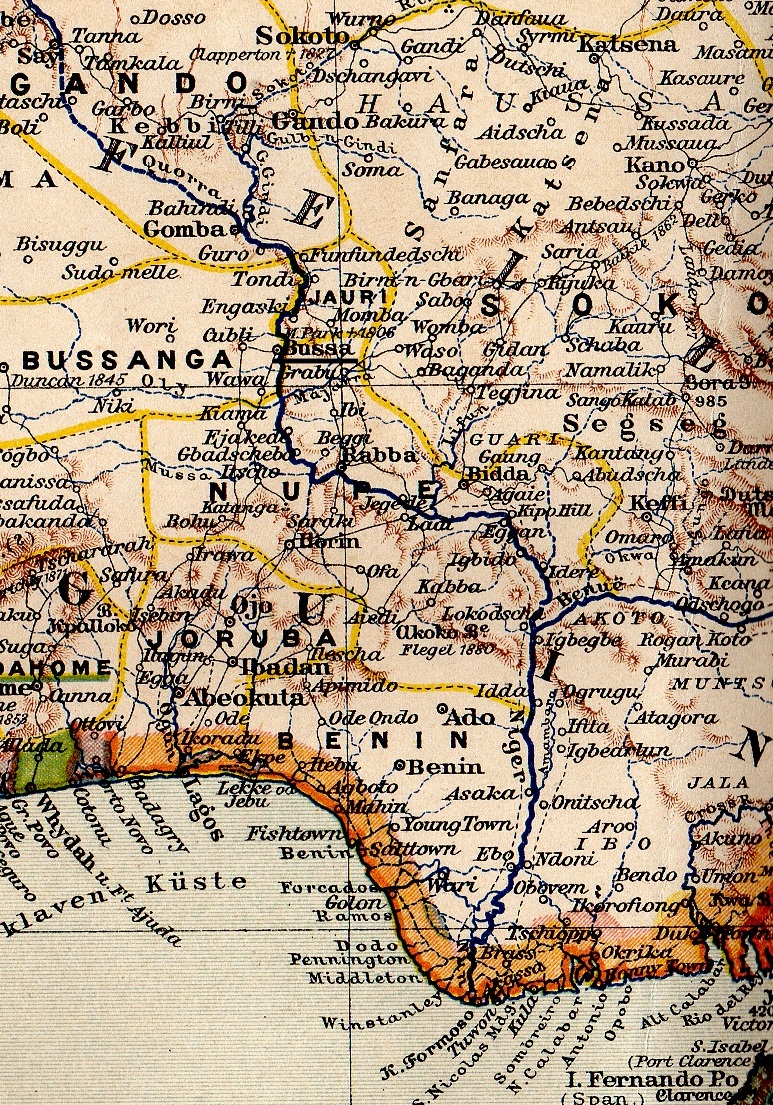
- Bussa (underlined, upper-left of centre) on an 1899 map of the Niger river

- Location within Nigeria
- Coordinates: 9.91°N 4.58°E
- Arrival of Kisra: c. 1325
- Filling of Lake Kainji: 1968

Bussa, also known as Boussa in older texts, was one of the main cities and kingdoms of the Borgu federation in northern Nigeria. It was the farthest navigable point on the Niger River from the coast, just above the rapids. The town site is now covered by Lake Kainji, which was created in 1968 with the construction of the Lake Kainji dam. The town was re-located to what is now called New Bussa.

== History ==
Bussa was founded by Woru, the eldest son of Kisra, and the became point from which the Wasangari spread throughout Borgu. They developed a political system that incorporated the indigenous Karabonde earth-priests as important members of the royal court. Although it is the oldest and traditional leader of the Borgu confederacy, Bussa was sometimes overshadowed by the more economically and politically powerful city of Nikki.

Bussa was attacked by the Songhai Empire in the 1490s, in 1505, and again in the middle of the 1500s. Despite fierce resistance, the Songhai occupied the city and devastated the surrounding region. After the collapse of the Songhai Empire in 1593, the Oyo Empire moved in and reduced Bussa to a tributary. This lasted until 1783, when Borgu regained independence by defeating Oyo at Gberegburu.

In 1806, British explorer Mungo Park drowned near Bussa while on his second expedition to trace the course of the Niger River. Richard Lander (1804–1834) an explorer relates that after the death of Mungo Park, the inhabitants of Bussa were attacked by a raging epidemic, which was regarded as a visitation from heaven. "Take care not to touch the whites lest you perish like the people..."

By the 1820s, Oyo was a shell of its former self. Fulani jihadists had taken control of Ilorin and ransacked the capital. Alaafin Oluewu looked to Borgu, which was also suffering raids, to join him in an 1837 effort to push back the Muslims. The king of Bussa joined an army led by Siru Kpera, the king of Nikki, which had initial success but eventually suffered a calamitous defeat. Of the main leaders, only the Bussawa escaped.

During 1894-1898 Bussa was disputed between Great Britain and France. In 1897, Bussa became part of the British Niger Coast protectorate.In 1915, an uprising took place in Bussa against the British policy of indirect rule. In 1920 the Emir of Bussa converted to Islam, and the population gradually followed his example in the following decades.

== References and sources ==
Sources

- Adekunle, Julius (2008). "The Wasangari: Politics and Identity in Borgu". Anthropos. 3 (2): 435–445. JSTOR 40467422.
- Akinwumi, Olayemi (1999). "Oral Traditions and the Political History of Borgu". Anthropos. 4 (1): 215–221. JSTOR 40465704.
- Akinwumi, Ogundiran (2020). The Yoruba: A New History. Indiana University Press. ISBN 9780253051509.
- Gomez, Michael (2018). African dominion : a new history of empire in early and medieval West Africa. Princeton, NJ: Princeton University Press. ISBN 9780691177427.
