= Islam in Senegal =

The Great Mosque of Touba, is one of the largest mosques in Senegal.

Islam is the predominant religion in Senegal. 89 percent of the country's population is estimated to be Muslim. Islam has had a presence in Senegal since the 11th century. Sufi brotherhoods expanded with French colonization, as people turned to religious authority rather than the colonial administration. The main Sufi orders are the Tijaniyyah, the Muridiyyah or Mourides, and to a lesser extent, the pan-Islamic Qadiriyyah and the smaller Layene order. Approximately 1% are Shiites.

== History ==
=== Introduction of Islam ===
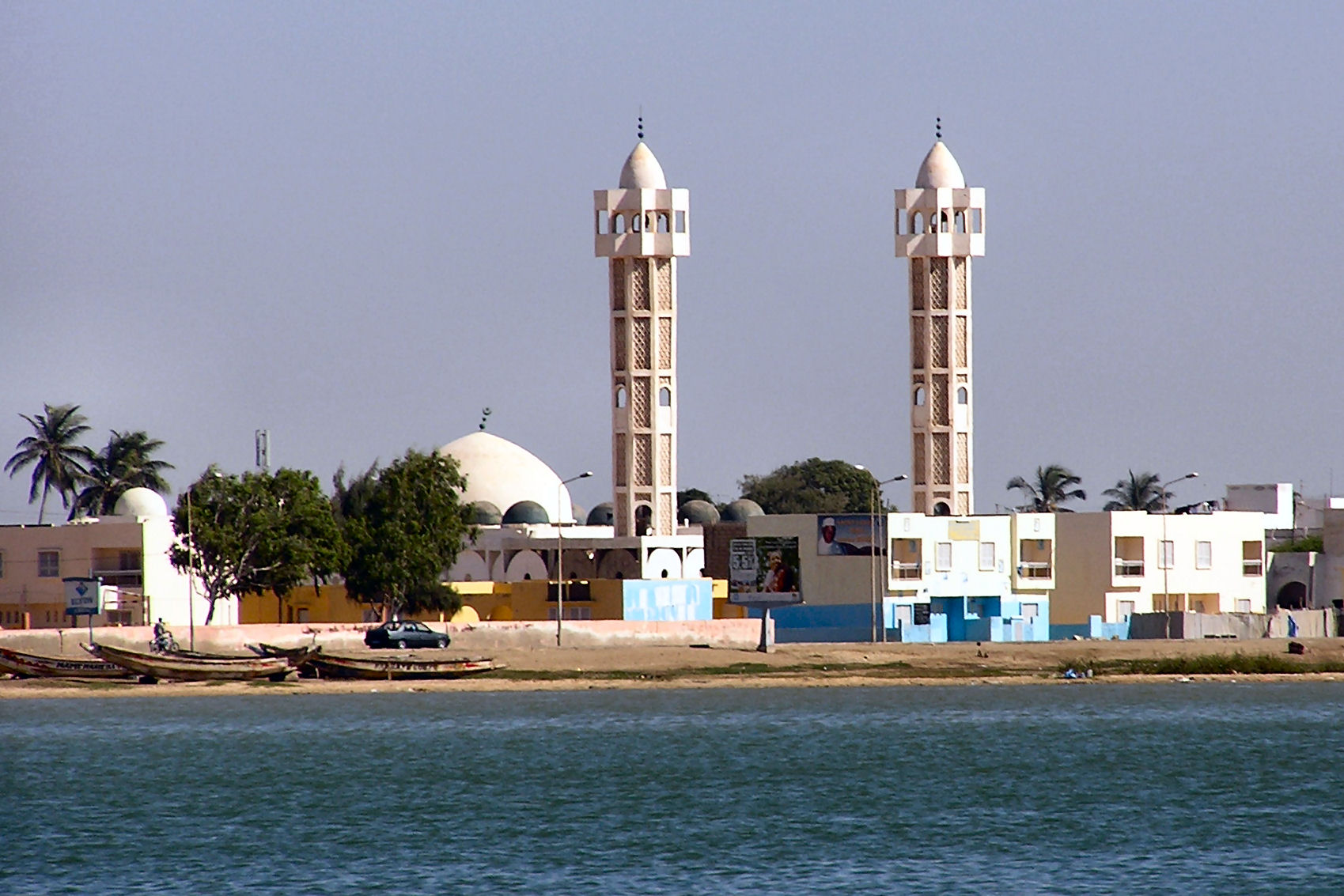
A mosque in Saint-Louis, Senegal.

For nearly a millennium, there has been a Muslim presence in Senegal. Islam's influence in the area began with the conversion of King of Takrur, War Jabi in 1040, likely as a result of the Trans-Saharan trade between North and West Africa. The King attempted to convert his subjects, who are now referred to as Tukulors or the Toucouleur people, in the first attempt to convert an entire region in this area. Other empires, such as the Jolof empire, were more resistant to Islam in favor of their traditional religion. Even in areas where an Islamic presence was found, many continued traditional animist practices, according to Portuguese accounts.

=== Expansion of Islam ===
During the 17th and 18th centuries, Islam was used as a structure of power and militarism. In the 17th century, Islam became the religion of the elite and merchant classes. In 1776, the Tukulors overthrew the Denianke Dynasty and constructed a theocratic oligarchy. Influenced by other Islamic movements throughout West Africa, they worked militaristically to convert traditional religious states and establish Muslim theocratic states. This expansion ceased temporarily when the Tukulors failed to convert the traditional states of the Serer, who defeated them and killed their 19th-century leader Maba Diakhou Ba at the Battle of Fandane-Thiouthioune in order to preserve their Serer religious faith. One such movement from Western Sudan was the Qadiriyya Sufi brotherhood, who traversed the Senegalese countryside gaining followers. This movement was eclipsed by the Tijaniyyah brotherhood.

=== French colonialism and Islam ===
During the 18th century, the French began to colonize the nation. Senegalese Muslims took a variety of responses to French colonization. Especially in the countryside, the Senegalese joined Sufi brotherhoods to unite against colonization. The popularity of the Tijaniyyah brotherhood marks this shift; Islam became "a rallying point for African resistance to the French". Omar Saidou Tall first created a Tijani brotherhood in West Africa after he was initiated into the Tijaniyya during his hajj to Mecca. In his attempt to create a Tijani Islamic empire in Senegal, Tall is described as the "most eminent of the Muslim clerical warriors".

The marabouts, leaders and sources of guidance in Sufi brotherhoods, became alternative sources of authority in dissidence from the French. Later, the Mouride brotherhood would serve this same role of resistance for the Senegalese. Many Mourides were former political authorities who lost their positions as the French took over, and were searching for a new source of power. The French felt threatened and targeted the leaders of these movements. The founder of the Mourides, Cheikh Amadou Bamba was arrested twice by the colonial administration. This injustice only furthered his popularity and the Mourides' extreme veneration of their leader. To this day, Cheikh Bamba is honored as an important leader of resistance in Senegal.

Other Muslims chose to cooperate with the French, and even gain positions of power within the French government. Senegal was the only colony in Black Africa in which the French used "assimilationist tactics", allowing elite Senegalese citizenship and political power if they became assimilated into French culture. In the cities, especially the Four Communes the French created, Muslim Sufi marabouts, religious authorities, were involved in Senegalese politics. Some argue that the marabouts collaborated with the French out of best interests for Senegal, because they felt they had no other choice. However, Muslim Reform movements responded angrily to the marabouts' collaboration with French authorities, calling these moves hypocritical. The most common of these Reformists was the Union Culturelle Musulmane, founded by Cheikh Toure in 1953, led by religious scholars, some of whom studied in Cairo universities.

These Reformists were responding to French colonial repression of Islamic culture in Senegal. As Mbacke states, the administration's "ultimate aim was to dominate minds" in order to take over the nation, and they saw Islam as standing in their way. Having enforced a secular state, the French also limited the establishment of Qur'anic schools, created secular rather than Islamic curriculum in public schools, restricted public access books on Islamic topics, limited contacts with Senegal and the Middle East, restricted hajj pilgrimages to Mecca, arrested and killed Muslim scholars.

== Sufi Islam ==
=== Sufi brotherhoods ===
In Senegal, 95% of Muslims belong to a Sufi brotherhood, more than any Muslim population in the world. The two largest orders are the Tijaniyyah and the Muridiyyah or Mourides, although the pan-Islamic Qadiriyyah and the smaller Layene brotherhood are also represented in parts of the country. In creating a brotherhood, each founder often has the objective of uniting all Muslims. However, in practice, those within a brotherhood often emphasize the superiority of their brotherhood's path over others. Mosques are created by specific brotherhoods, though individuals are free to attend whichever mosque they prefer.

The Qadiriyyah is the smallest and oldest brotherhood in Senegal. It was introduced in the 18th and 19th century by missionaries from Mauritania and the Niger Bend.

More Senegalese Sufis identify with the Tijaniyya order than any other. This order was brought to Senegal by El Hadj Umar Tall (1780-1840), who attempted to create an Islamic empire and organize all Muslims. Though he largely failed during his lifetime, the order has since expanded greatly. The Tijanis place a strong emphasis on Koranic education, and have created schools for girls as well. There are three dynasties of Tijanis, depending on the marabout a following owes most allegiance to: the Sy and Niasse in Wolof and Serer, and the Tall in Tukulor. The Niasses are sometimes seen as radical and a threat to Senegalese national authority, but Tijanis have otherwise maintained strong relationships with the Senegalese government.

The Mouride order is the most tightly organized and influential of Senegal's Sufi brotherhoods. When first created, the Mourides proclaimed their superiority over the Tijaniyya, who in turn responded with violent repression of the Mourides. The Mourides were founded by Cheikh Ahmadou Bamba (1850-1927) who strongly rejected the French colonial powers, and this position attracted many political leaders who lost their positions due to French occupation. Every year, thousands of Senegal make a pilgrimage to Touba for a religious festival held by the Mourides to honor Cheikh Bamba. Many have written of the Mourides because a deviationist faction of this brotherhood has become radical and at times dangerous. This faction does not represent a majority of Mourides and a Pew Report on Senegalese religion revealed that 92% of Senegalese do not associate the word "violent" with Muslims.

The Layene are a small but growing Sufi brotherhood. They are often rejected by the larger Muslim population for beliefs some call un-Islamic, including their founder's assertion that he was a Prophet.

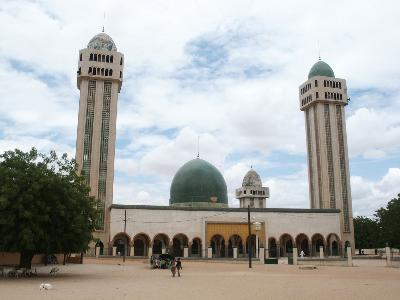
A mosque in Kaolack, Senegal.

=== Practices ===
The Sufi brotherhoods or tariqas in Senegal are organized in elaborate hierarchies. The most powerful leader is the caliph-general, a term enforced by the colonial French and only used in Mouride and Layene orders. The founder of the brotherhood is its first caliph-general, and his position is inherited by succeeders. Secondary to the caliph-generals are shaykhs or marabouts, who act as intermediaries and provide instruction for their murids, or aspirants.

Marabouts rely on donations from their followers, called murids or taalibes. In turn, marabouts work with their followers, often arranging marriages or resolving disputes. Followers perform the harsh work of tending to the caliph's peanut or grain fields, and "the most ambitious or lucky ones" assist the caliph with his private or public affairs with the hope of receiving spiritual teachings.

Traditionally, parents often sent their children to live with their marabout and become taalibes. These children may engage in harsh work in the countryside, or beg for donations in urban areas. This practice has sparked a response from UNICEF and other human rights organizations, who argue that these practices constitute child abuse. These Western organizations often claim this problem is new and on the rise. They associate this practice with parents' inabilities to raise their children, economic strain, or uncontrolled fertility. On the contrary, scholars have found that this practice has existed for centuries, acts as a source of moral training for children, and is actually in decline.

Members of brotherhoods also create smaller associations or daairas within their communities. These groups meet informally to sing religious songs, pray, engage in other types of devotion, and discuss the history of their brotherhood. They also organize religious activities, such as trips to see their marabout. Daairas may be created by residents of a neighborhood, employees of a business, or students at a university. These associations revitalize the connection between marabout and follower, even when separated by distance. Daairas are present in all Senegalese brotherhoods.

=== Women and leadership ===
Senegalese women are active in Sufi brotherhoods. They often organize or play significant roles within daairas, a brotherhood's smaller community associations. Women play a public role in the community doing volunteer work, collecting money for the marabout, organizing religious visits, or promoting the daaira's activities on the radio or television.

Though rare, women can even become spiritual leaders or marabouts within the brotherhood. The Mourides have had one female marabout, Sokhna Magat Diop, who inherited her father's position. Qadiriyya women have also attained the position of marabout.

Senegal has already had a female Muslim prime minister, Mame Madior Boye.

== Shia Islam ==
Shia Islam in Senegal is practiced by small number of Senegalese people, as well as by the Lebanese community in Senegal.

Shia Islam is the primary religion of the Lebanese community in Senegal, which has been established in Senegal for over a century. It is also practiced by a growing number of native Senegalese, including the Wolof and Fula peoples.

Since the 1970s, and especially with the arrival of the Mozdahir community and their leader Cherif Mohamed Aly Aidara in the early 2000s, the number of native Shi'i Senegalese has steadily increased in both urban and rural areas. According to Leichtman (2017), Mozdahir's various rural development projects help bridge the urban-rural divide among Shi'i Muslims in Senegal, and have helped to increase the number of Shi'i Muslims in Senegal.

== Popular culture ==
The importance of Sufism is evident in Senegal's modern popular culture. Nearly every Senegalese singer has a song incorporating themes of Sufi history. Especially common are praise songs honoring individual Sufi leaders, as well as work having to do with the controversy of spiritual leaders involving themselves in politics. International stars such as Baaba Maal and Youssou N'Dour incorporate Sufi themes into their work. Youssou N'Dour's entire album Egypt deals with Sufism. N'Dour describes the album as an exploration of his own personal faith, as well as a means of connecting North African and Arab Islam to West African Sufism.

== See also ==
- Religion in Senegal
- Muslim brotherhoods of Senegal
- Mouride
- Tijani
- Sufism
- Islam in Africa
- Shia Islam in Senegal

== Notes ==
1. Mbye, 447-448
2. Ousman, 80-82
