= Serigne Mouhamadou Moustapha Mbacké =

Caliph of the Mouride Brotherhood
- In office 1927–1945
- Succeeded by: Serigne Mouhamadou Fallilou Mbacké

Personal details
- Born: 1888 Daaru Salaam, Senegal
- Died: July 13, 1945 (aged 56–57) Touba, Senegal
- Children: Serigne Cheikh Ahmadou Mbacke Gainde Fatma, Serigne Mbacké Madina
- Parent(s): Amadou Bamba, Soxna Aminata Lo

Serigne Mouhamadou Moustapha Mbacké (Serigne Muhammadu Moustapha Mbacke; Wolof: Sëriñ Muhammadu Mustafaa Mbàkke; 1888-1945) was a Senegalese religious leader. He served as the first Caliph of the Mouride brotherhood, a large Sufi order based in Senegal, from 1927 until his death on July 13, 1945. He was the first son of Sufi saint and religious leader Sheikh Amadou Bamba.

== Life ==
Serigne Mouhamadou Moustapha Mbacké was born in 1888 in Daaru Salaam, Senegal. His mother was Soxna Aminata Lo, while his maternal uncle, Serigne Ndame Abdu Rahman Lo, taught him Quranic studies. He became the first Mouride caliph after his father, Sheikh Amadou Bamba, died in 1927.

=== Construction of the Great Mosque of Touba ===
Cheikh Moustapha undertook one of the main projects of the Mouride community: the construction of the Great Mosque of Touba. In 1928, he obtained from the colonial private council the registration of a 400-hectare land lease on which the mosque was to be built. He began by laying the Diourbel-Touba railroad line. Construction of the railroad was a condition imposed by the colonial authorities to thwart the Touba Mosque project. With the determination of Chekh the new khalife, work began on November 11, 1929. The 50-km stretch was completed on February 14, 1921.

The construction of the Great Mosque of Touba itself was marked by major disputes due to attempts to slow down the project. On October 16, 1930, Cheikh Mouhamadou Moustapha Mbacke summoned the administrator Pierre Tallerie, in charge of building the grand mosque, before the Dakar tribunal hors classe, for fraud. MP Blaise Diagne, who had great admiration for Cheikh Ahmadou Bamba, played a decisive role in the dispute between Serigne Modou Moustapha and Tallerie. The case was won by the Chekh Mouhamadou Moustapha Mbacke (1st Khalifa of the Mourides), with the support of MP Blaise Diagne, Mr Lamine Guèye and Serigne Massourang Sourang. Mouhamadou Moustapha Mbacké began work on Touba's Grand Mosque in 1932 (the official building permit was issued in 1929). The first stone was laid on March 4, 1932. Work continued until 1939, when the outbreak of the Second World War brought work to a temporary halt. Work resumed only 8 years later under the Khalifate of Serigne Mouhamadou Fallilou Mbacké, 2nd Khalifa.

=== Initiator of the first Touba Magal ===
In 1928, Cheikh Moustapha organized the first Magal of Touba after his father. Under his leadership, the holy city, the capital of Mouridism, had its first borehole installed in Ndame. The first Magal in 1928 was attended by 70,000 people. Today, the last Magal on September 4, 2023 brought together a record of 5,875,536 people.

=== Mediator for peace ===
Cheikh Moustapha was also a great conciliator. During the 1st Dakar-Niger railway workers' strike of 1938, during which there were very violent clashes between workers and railway agents, Cheikh Moustapha played the role of a conciliator. He began by laying the Diourbel-Touba railroad line. He offered to mediate on behalf of the Governor General, and visited the main centers of the conflict. The railroad workers, faced with the princely bearing of this great religious leader and his wise words, agreed to put an end to their movement.
