= Serigne Abdou Khadr Mbacké =

Caliph of the Mouride Brotherhood
- In office 1989–1990
- Preceded by: Serigne Abdou Ahad Mbacké
- Succeeded by: Serigne Saliou Mbacké

Personal details
- Born: 1914; Daaru Alimul Kabir, Ndame, Senegal
- Died: 1990; Touba, Senegal

Serigne Abdou Khadr Mbacké (Serigne Abdu Qadr Mbacke; Wolof: Sëriñ Abdu Xaadir Mbàkke; 1914-1990) was a Senegalese religious leader. He served as the fourth Caliph of the Mouride brotherhood, a large Sufi order based in Senegal, from 1989 until his death in 1990. He was the son of Sufi saint and religious leader Sheikh Amadou Bamba.

== Life ==
Serigne Abdou Khadr Mbacké was born in 1914 at Daaru Alimul Kabir in Ndame, Senegal to Amadou Bamba (father) and Soxna Aminata Bousso (mother). He had the shortest term out of any other Mouride caliph, having served as Caliph for only eleven months.
