= Marabout =

Sufi religious leader and teacher in West Africa

In the Muslim world, the marabout (Arabic: مُرابِط, romanized: murābiṭ, lit. 'one who is attached/garrisoned') is a descendant of Muhammad (Arabic: سـيّد, romanized: sayyid and sidi in the Maghreb) and a Muslim religious leader and teacher who historically had the function of a chaplain serving as a part of an Islamic army, notably in North Africa and the Sahara region, in West Africa, and historically in the Maghreb.

The marabout is often a scholar of the Quran, or religious teacher. Others may be wandering holy men who survive on alms or as spiritual directors of Muslim religious communities, often as muršid ('guide') of Sufi orders. The term marabout is also used for the mausolea of such religious leaders (cf. maqām, mazār, in Palestine also walī/velī).

== West Africa ==
=== Muslim religious teachers ===
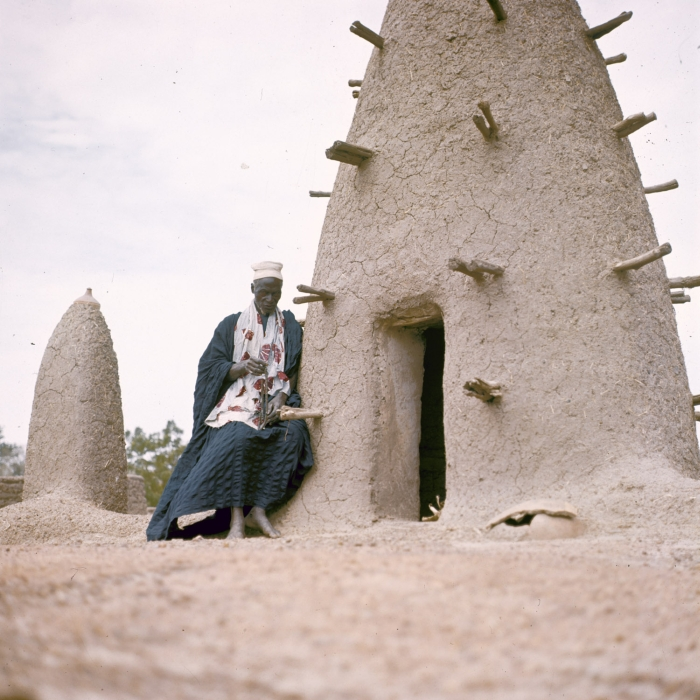
Picture of a marabout in the Republic of Upper Volta (now Burkina Faso) c. 1970

Muslim Sufi brotherhoods were one of the main organizing forms of Islam in precolonial West Africa, and with the spread of Sufism into the area, the marabout's role combined with local practices throughout Senegambia, the Niger River Valley, and the Futa Jallon. Here, Sufi Muslim believers follow a marabout, elsewhere known as a muršid ('guide'). The term marabout was also adopted by French colonial officials, and applied to most any imam, Muslim teacher, or secular leader who appealed to the Islamic tradition.

Today marabouts can be traveling holy men who survive on alms, religious teachers who take in young talibes at Quranic schools, or distinguished Muslim religious leaders and scholars, both in and out of the Sufi brotherhoods which dominate the Islamic spiritual life in Senegambia.

In the Muslim brotherhoods of Senegal, marabouts are organized in elaborate hierarchies; the highest marabout of the Mourides, for example, has been elevated to the status of a "caliph" or "ruler of the faithful" (Amir al-Mu'minin). Older, North African-based Sufi brotherhoods such as the Tijaniyyah and the Qadiriyyah base their structures on respect for teachers and religious leaders who, south of the Sahara, often are called marabouts. Those who devote themselves to prayer or study, either based in communities, religious centers, or wandering in the larger society, are named marabouts. In Senegal and Mali, these marabouts rely on donations to live. Often there is a traditional bond to support a specific marabout that has accumulated over generations within a family. Marabouts normally dress in traditional West African robes and live a simple, ascetic life.

=== Syncretic spiritualists ===
The spread in sub-Saharan Africa of the marabout's role from the 8th through 13th centuries created in some places a mixture of roles with pre-Islamic priests, local healers, and diviners. Thus, many fortune tellers and self-styled spiritual guides take the name marabout, something rejected by more orthodox Muslims and Sufi brotherhoods alike. The recent diaspora of West Africans (to Paris in particular) has brought this tradition to Europe and North America, where some marabouts advertise their services as fortune tellers. An eshu of Quimbanda, Marabô, is believed to have carried this esoteric and shamanic role into Brazil. Contemporary marabouts in Senegal advertise on television and have hot lines.

=== Political influence ===
==== 15-18th centuries ====
Marabouts have been prominent members of Wolof society since the arrival of Sufi brotherhoods from the Maghreb in the 15th century. Their advanced knowledge of the Quran and esteemed reputation have often allowed them to act as traders, priests, judges, or magicians in conjunction with their roles of community religious leaders. Additionally, because of their ability to read and write, village chiefs would frequently appoint marabouts as secretaries or advisers as a means to communicate with neighboring rulers.

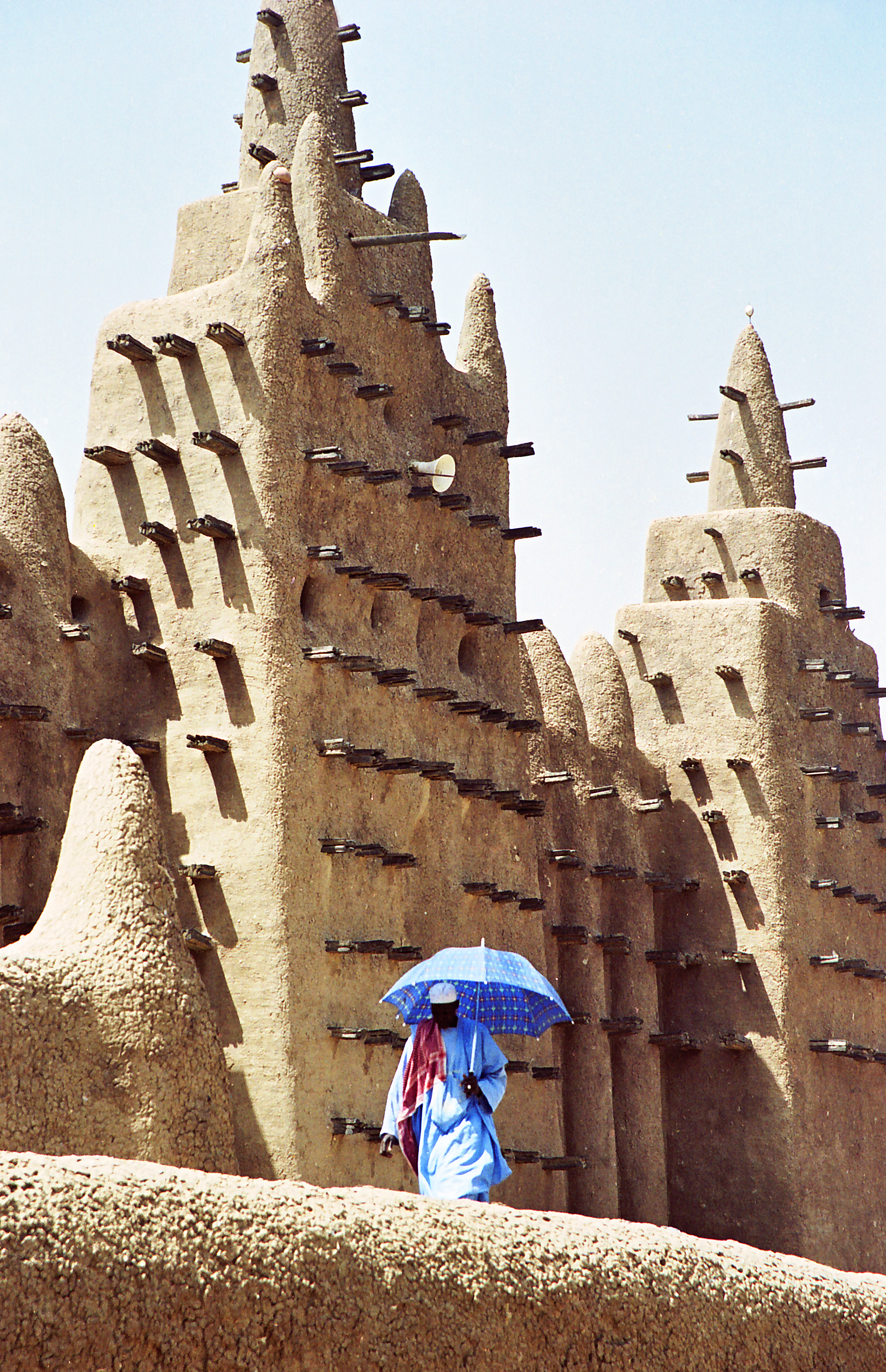
Marabout in Djenné, Mali

The marabouts' expanding influence in politics paired with their unique allegiance of the Muslim community eventually posed a real threat to the chiefs who had appointed them. In 1673 the Marabout War broke out in the Senegal River valley, with Nasr ad-Din, a Berber marabout, leading a Muslim coalition to overthrow several secular kingdoms before eventually being defeated. In 1776, inspired by the rise of the Imamate of Futa Toro, the marabouts of Cayor again began to agitate for political power. The Damel pre-emptively attacked, sparking a rebellion in which the marabouts were defeated and many were sold into slavery. The surviving marabouts played an important role in founding the Lebou republic and its capital Dakar on the Cap-Vert peninsula.

Militant Islam once again emerged as a potent force in the Wolof states in the middle of the 19th century. Militant marabouts primarily of Tukulor origin, called "warrior marabouts", completely rejected the authority of local chiefs and sought to establish theocratic Muslim states. As the authority of chiefs and royal armies were undermined by propaganda and military force used by the warrior marabouts, Muslim resistors turned to local marabouts for guidance and protection from their oppressors. After three decades of war and conflict, the warrior marabouts were gradually ousted from the Wolof states as French colonists began to take a tighter hold on the region. As confidence in the leadership abilities of chiefs and rulers declined as a result of the conflict, marabouts emerged as the most trusted and revered source of leadership in Wolof communities.

==== Post-French colonization ====
French colonizers had difficulties adjusting to ruling over Muslim societies. Particularly in West Africa, constructing institutions of colonial rule that did not favor certain constituencies while neglecting others proved to be a tricky task. The French opted for forms of indirect rule through the local aristocracy in an effort to maintain order and keep administrative costs down, but found that many subjects detested these colonial chiefs and rulers and tended to gravitate towards their local marabouts. Marabouts were admired for their transparency and righteousness as they were known to renounce political powers, while ensuring economic, social, and religious stability within their communities. Since the judgment of marabouts is so influential, the success or failure of a politician would be almost entirely contingent on the support of more prominent marabouts. Because of this, politicians would try to appease marabouts by agreeing to promote their Sufi brotherhood's best interests in turn for their endorsement, with some politicians believing that winning an election would be impossible without the support of a marabout. This political dynamic, based on patronage and exchanges, would lead to a somewhat of an alliance between marabouts and the French colonizers. Along with endorsing certain politicians in exchange for favors, French colonial administrators sought out marabouts and heads of Sufi brotherhoods to act as intermediaries between colonial administrators and West African Muslims to ensure appropriate allocation of power and resources to avoid any potential conflict.

==== Post-independence ====
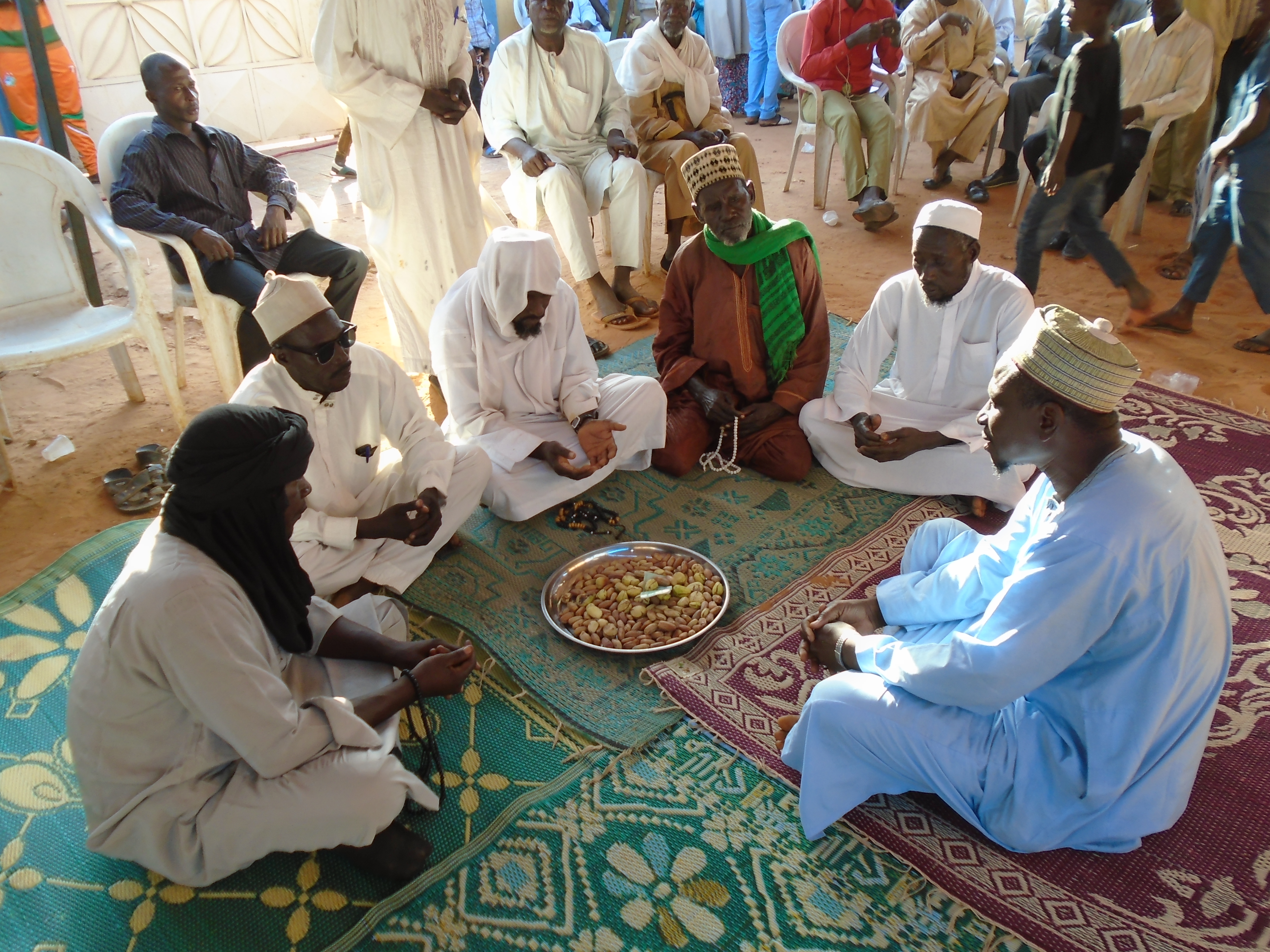
Marabouts reciting Al-Fatiha during a baptism in Niger

After Senegal gained its independence from France in 1960, marabouts and leaders of Sufi Brotherhoods (also marabouts), or the Khalife-Général, have continued to play influential roles in Senegalese politics. Some have questioned the utility of having clientelist relationships between marabouts and government officials in a modern democracy. The new "grandson" generation of marabouts has cultivated a more independent and secular political outlook and have proven that they are willing to question the authority of their predecessors. In Senegal's 1988 presidential election, Khalife-Général Abdou Lahatte Mbakke supported Abdou Diouf for reelection. Both as public endorsement and as a reward for installing new roads and street lamps in Touba while in office, the Khalife-Général declared a ndiggël (a binding command issued by the Khalife-Général to all members of the Mouride Brotherhood) that proclaimed that all men must vote for Diouf. Although multiple Khalife-Général have issued 'ndiggël politique' in support of a presidential candidate in previous elections, several marabouts of the "grandson" generation openly rejected the command by voting for the opposition instead. These marabouts believed that the ndiggël violated their secular political rights, which was a sentiment shared among many other Mourides in Touba.

In 1997, a rural council of Touba Mosquée in Senegal issued a set of new taxes meant to fund an ambitions development project in the holy city. City merchants promptly voiced their displeasure of the new taxes and threatened to kick the rural council, whose members were all appointed by the Mouride Khalife-Général, out of the city. Although tax revolts are not uncommon elsewhere, this incident was particularly noteworthy as the merchants' blatant refusal exhibited a departure from typical state-society relations in Senegal. Declining economic performance in Senegal may lead to more taxes in the future, which means political actors may have to adjust or fundamentally alter their clientelist relationships with marabouts and Khalife-Général.

The Political Influence of Marabouts in Senegal’s Democratization

The political influence of marabouts in Senegal has been a significant aspect of Senegal’s democratization process. Leaders of Sufi brotherhoods, primarily the Mouride and Tijaniyya orders, served as bridges connecting civilians and political elites in Senegal. The influence marabouts have had in Senegal is far more than spiritual, as they’ve been involved in numerous institutional changes throughout the decades. Marabouts have a wide array of rural support, community welfare systems, and organized networks that provide them with institutional and political influence. In creating and maintaining these networks, marabouts act as electoral brokers during elections, usually being the deciding factor of what parties can mobilize local support. Marabout’s institutional influence has contributed to Senegal’s pathway to democratization.

Marabouts in Patronage-Clientelism

While Senegal has maintained multiparty institutions for decades, early democratization was controlled by a patronage-clientelism system between political leaders/elites and Sufi authorities. Senegal’s democratization is not just a simple transition from traditional practice to modern politics. It is a process that integrates attributes of negotiation, coexistence, and adaptation between religious elites (marabouts) and democratic institutions. Patronage ties between politicians and marabouts shape how resources are distributed to local communities, how political participation is mobilized, and how legitimacy is constructed in public life.

Political elites sought endorsements from marabouts in exchange for state resources, a variety of development projects, or favors in order to gain votes. Politicians have granted marabouts favors such as water and electricity during religious events they may be hosting, like the Grand Magal of Touba, an annual pilgrimage of the Sufi brotherhoods. Some go as far as distributing diplomatic passports, or pilgrimage to Mecca. In the 1980s and 1990s, during the height of political liberalization, Sufi leaders had contradicting roles. On one hand, some marabouts encouraged communities to be politically involved and sought the distribution of power. Others maintained close personal ties with elites, helping weaken potential opposition movements rather than confrontational forms of politics. This dual role that marabouts played in Senegal, some mobilizing voters while others discouraging political radicalism, enabled the persistence of democratic institutions, but at the same time, limited the power of autonomous civil society organizations. While marabouts kept democracies going, this created a system that blocked communities from making large political changes. This constrained form of politics is what allowed marabouts to be intermediaries between political elites and communities.

Patronage-Clientelism in Rural Communities

Critics argue that the transactional changes between Sufi authorities and politicians negatively reinforce toxic social hierarchy systems. Sufi brotherhoods often demand favors to benefit their communities; therefore, communities that lack strong ties with the brotherhoods may face an unequal distribution of resources. This arrangement between marabouts and politicians is described as a “patrimonial democracy,” in which democratic institutions coexist with informal systems of authority that mediate state–society relations.

Urban and rural voters in Senegal show extremely different levels of support for incumbents. Studies show that rural communities are more likely to be influenced by Sufi brotherhoods, compared to their urban counterparts. Marabouts can leverage their prestige, religious influence, and community networks to influence national decision-making, primarily in rural communities. The patron-clientelism system is a large factor for higher rural incumbent support. Incumbents have a lot of resource advantages and leverage them to gain support. It allows them to employ brokers (“Porteurs de Voix”) more effectively in rural communities. Rewards range from cash, cars, pilgrimages, and Qur’ans. In 2012, rewards went as far as allowances for 30,000 village chiefs and even 2 billion CFA sent to Touba. Politicians report that bloc voting, social pressure, and easier monitoring make rural clientelism extremely effective.

Modern-Day Political Influence

While marabout endorsements are still valuable to political leaders, urban youth movements and educated community members have created new and modern strategies for mobilization. This gives the marabouts, who were once seen as the sole mobilizers, a run for their money. This shift shows the rapid urbanization, growth in literacy rates, and rise of digital media technology, which in turn reduces marabout’s access to mobilize others.

Despite these changes, marabouts continue to serve as important political intermediaries. Their influence holds strong because Sufi brotherhoods are deeply embedded in Senegal’s society, providing welfare services, education, and informal mediation that the state does not always fully supply. Marabouts have constantly acted as mediators between political institutions and communities. This role has been shaping perceptions of legitimacy and moral authority during elections and political debates. Despite the youth seeking new agendas on voter mobilization, they continue to look up to marabouts, often seeking blessings, symbolic legitimacy, and access to community networks.

== Maghreb ==
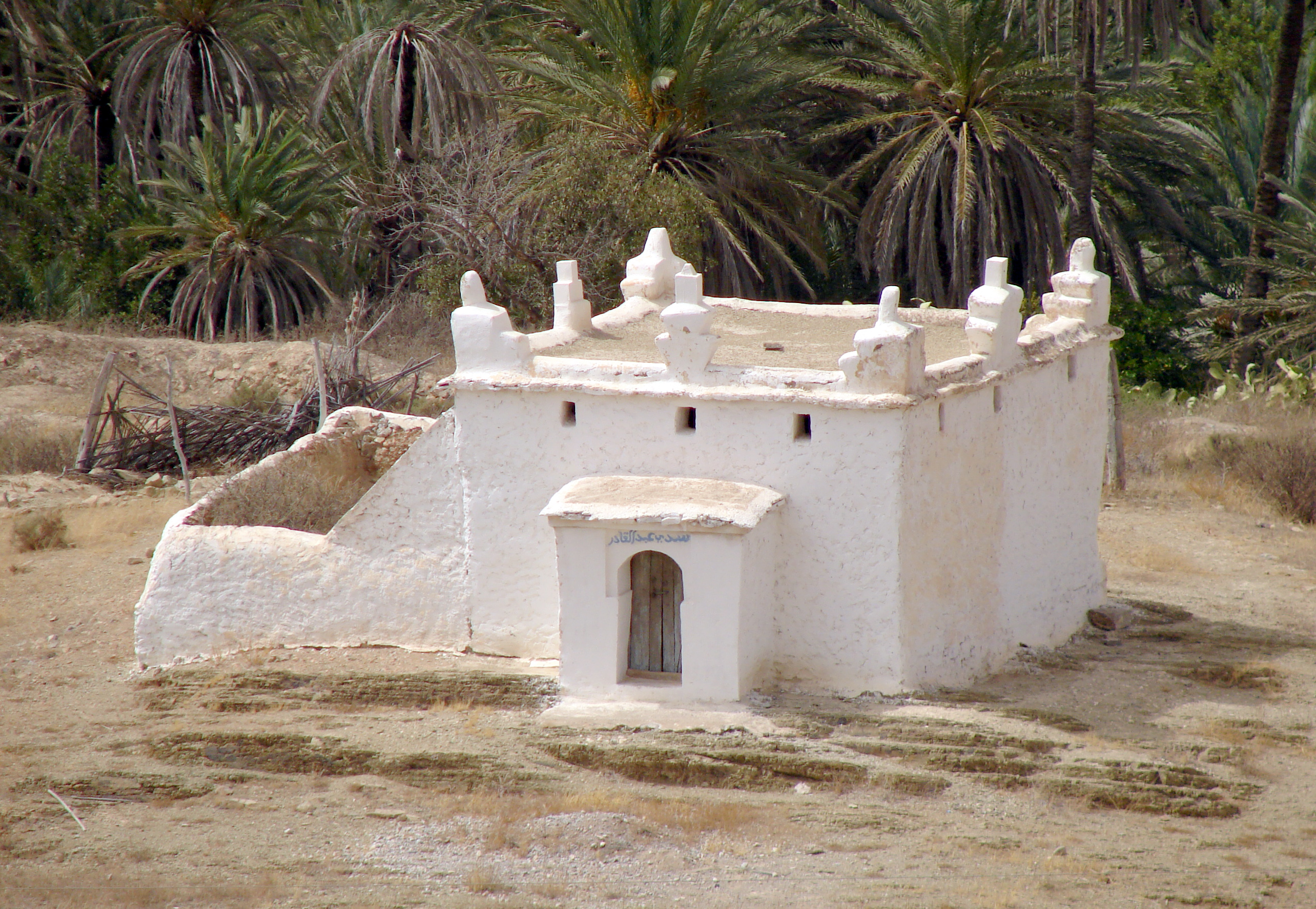
Marabout's tomb, southern Morocco

The term marabout appears during the Muslim conquest of the Maghreb. It is derived from the Arabic murābiṭ "one who is garrisoned": religious students and military volunteers who manned ribats at the time of the conquest. Today, marabout means "saint" in the Berber languages and in general refers to Sufi Muslim teachers who head a lodge or school called a zāwiya associated with a specific school or tradition, called a ṭarīqah "way, path" (Arabic: طريقه). However, Charles de Foucauld and Albert Peyriguère, both living as Catholic hermits among Berbers in the Maghreb, were called marabouts by the local population due to their saintly lives.

The pronunciation of that word varies by language. For example, it is pronounced amrabadh in Tarifit. Marabouts are known as sidi (سيدي) in Maghrebi Arabic. Many cities in Morocco got their names from local marabouts, and the name of those cities usually begins with "Sidi" followed by the name of the local marabout. Modern Standard Arabic for "saint" is "walī" (ولي).

A marabout may also refer to a tomb (Arabic: قُبّة qubba "dome") of a venerated saint, and such places have become holy centers and places of pious reflection.

=== Some Zāwiyas linked with specific marabouts ===
==== Morocco ====
In Morocco:

- Sidi Ali el Goumi
- Sidi Rhaj Amar (Arabda)
- Sidi Allal el Behraoui
- Sidi Abdelah ben Hassoun
- Sidi Moulay Idriss
- Sidi fath
- Sidi el Arbi ben sayyeh
- Sidi Ahmed Tijani
- Sidi Moulay Ali sherif
- Sidi Hajj Hamza Qadiri Boutchichi
- Sidi Sheikh Abdul Qadir Jilani
- Sidi Abdel Kader el Alami
- Sidi Moulay Ibrahim
- Sidi Mohammed Ben Aissa
- Sidi Ahmed Ben Idris Al-Fassi (Idrissiya and Sanoussiya)
- Ahmad u Musa
- Sidi Abu Lhcen Shadili
- Sidi Moulay Abdeslam ibn Mchich Alami (Jbala)
- Sidi Muhammad al-Arabi al-Darqawi
- Sidi Muhammad ibn Sulayman al-Jazuli al-Simlali
- Sidi Abu Abdallah Mohammed Amghar
- Sidi Abu Abdallah al-Qaim bi Amrillah
- Sidi Muhammad ben Issa al-Barnusi al-Fasi Zarruq
- Sidi Moulay Outman (Khaldy-yeen, Beni Arouse), Morocco
- Sidi Mbarek (Khaldy-yeen, Beni Arouse), Morocco
- Sidi Heddi (Khaldy-yeen, Beni Arouse), Morocco
- (alternatively) Zawiyas:
  - Zaouïa Naciria
  - Zaouïa Cherqaouia
  - Zaouia Aïssaouia
  - Zaouia Tidjaniya
  - Zaouia Idrissiya
  - Zaouia Sanoussiya
  - Zaouia Al Qadiriya
  - Zaouia Al Alamiya
  - Zaouia Jazouliya semlaliya
  - Zaouia Hamdouchia
  - Zaouia Sidi Outman (Khaldyeen, Beni Arouse), Morocco

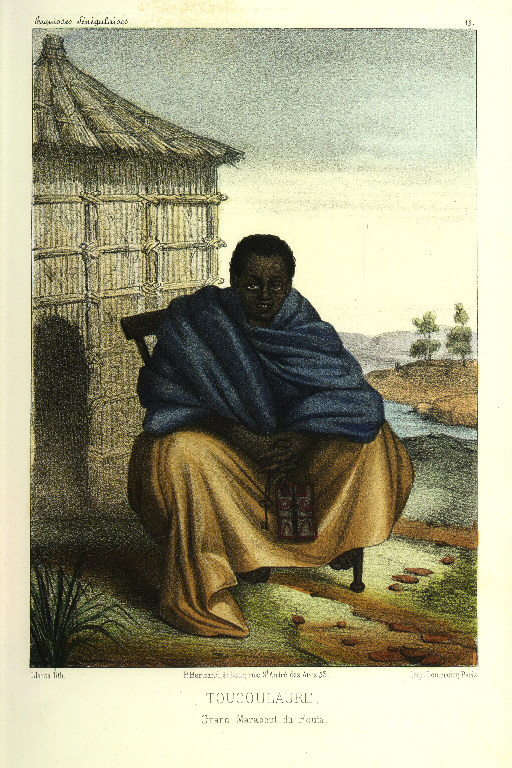
A Toucouleur marabout (1853)

==== Algeria ====
In Algeria:

- sidi Mohand Rezag Ou Assous from akfadou bejaia
- Sidi Ahmed al Tijani of 'Aïn Madhi, around Laghouat Province founder of Tijaniyyah
- Sidi Ahmed ou Saïd du hameau Mestiga, village of Adeni in Kabylia (between Tizi Ouzou and L'Arbaâ Nath Irathen)
- Sidi M'hamed Bou Qobrine Founder of the Rahmaniya (Algiers and Bounouh)
- Sidi Abder Rahman El Thaelebi, founder of the Thaalibiya (Algiers)
- Sidi M'hend oumalek (Tifrit nait oumalek)
- Sidi Moh'Ali oulhadj (Tifrit n'Aït el Hadj)
- Sidi Harrat Benaissa El Idrissi (Zemmora, Relizane)
- Sidi Abd-Allah ben Mançour
- Sidi Abdelkader djilali (tizi-ouzou)
- Sidi Abid Echerrif (Guentis)
- Sidi Abou AbdAllah Ech Choudi El Halloui
- Sidi A'hmed el Mejdoub
- Sidi Bel Abbes (namesake of Sidi Bel Abbès)
- Sidi Ben-Ali (Aïn el Hout - Tlemcen)
- Sidi Ben-Ali (Nédromah)
- Sidi Ben-Azzouz (Borj Ben Azzouz)
- Sidi Bicinti el basco
- Sidi Bou Adjami
- Sidi Boudarga
- Sidi Boudjemaa
- Sidi Brahim
- Sidi Daoudi
- Sioud anta' El-Eubbad es-Saffi
- Sidi En-Naceur
- Sidi Et Toumi
- Sidi Hamadouche
- Sî ibn 'Alî Sharîf (Akbou)
- Sidi Mohammed Ben Omar El Houari
- Sidi Mohammed bou Semah'a,
- Sidi Moh'amed Ou'l Il'afian.
- Sidi Moulebhar
- Sidi Qadir
- Sidi Bel-Ezrag
- Sidi Serhane
- Sidi ghiles (tipaza)
- Sidi Soumeymane Ben Abdallah
- Zaouia de Sidi Benamar (Fillaoussenne)
- Sidi-Wahhab
- Sidi Yahia el Aidly (Akbou)
- Sidi Yakkout
- Oulad bel Kacem

==== Tunisia ====
In Tunisia:

- Zaouïa de Sidi Ben Azzouz. Nefta
- Zaouïa de Sidi Bouteffaha. Béja
- Zaouïa de Sidi Salah Zlaoui. Béja
- Zaouïa de Sidi Abdelkader. Béja
- Zaouïa de Sidi Bou Arba. Béja
- Zaouïa de Sidi Taieb. Béja
- Zaouïa de Sidi Baba Ali Smadhi. Béja
- Zaouïa de Sidi Ali El Mekki
- Zaouïa de Sidi El Mazri. Monastir
- Zaouïa de Sidi Bou Jaafar. Sousse
- Zaouïa de Sidi Abdel Hamid. Sousse

==== France ====
In France:

- Sidi Bel Hadj El Maafi, French-Algerian imam and marabout who saved Jews during World War II

== See also ==
- Berbers and Islam – History of the Berber people who converted to Islam
- Ghazi – Arabic term for a military raider
- Mouride Order – Sufi mystic order in Sunni Islam
- Touray – Gambian surname indicating descent from a marabout
