= Grand Magal of Touba =

Annual religious pilgrimage of the Senegalese Mouride Brotherhood

The Great Mosque of Touba (Touba, Senegal)

The Grand Magal of Touba is the annual religious pilgrimage of the Senegalese Mouride Brotherhood, one of the four Islamic Sufi orders of Senegal. On the 18th of Safar, the second month of the Islamic calendar, pilgrims gather in the holy Mouride city of Touba to celebrate the life and teachings of Amadou Bamba, the founder of the brotherhood.

The Grand Magal has been recognized as "one of the most popular pilgrimages in the world," with over 6 million participating in 2025. The pilgrimage dates back to 1928 (one year after Bamba's death) and commemorates his 1895 exile to Gabon by the French colonial government.

== Etymology and history ==
"Magal" is a Wolof word derived from the verb "mag," which means "to be important" or "to be old"; the noun form is translated as "celebration" or "anniversary." There are other Mouride magals annually, such as the Magal of Saint Louis, which commemorates a prayer performed by the saint in 1895 in defiance of colonial authorities. However, the Grand Magal is the most important and widely attended of the Mouride magals. It is the largest celebration in Senegal, both religious and secular.

The Grand Magal originates in a request of Amadou Bamba's in which he asked that his followers celebrate the anniversary of his exile to Gabon. However, after Bamba's death in 1927, his son and successor Moustapha Mbacke organized the first Mouride gathering on the anniversary of his death rather than his exile (the first of these early Magals occurred in 1928, with an estimated participation of 70,000). This date remained until 1946, when Serigne Moustapha Mbacke's successor, Falilou Mbacke, changed the date of the Magal to the anniversary of Bamba's exile, in accordance with Bamba's original wishes. The period of exile in Gabon holds great importance to Mourides: it is seen as a time of persecution and testing of Bamba's spiritual strength and resolve.

The Grand Magal has grown over the years, from hundreds of thousands of pilgrims attending in the later decades of the twentieth century to nearly 2 million in 2000 and over 3 million in 2011. The 2025 Magal of Touba marked a record attendance, with 6,583,278 participants recorded, according to a report by Émergence Consulting Group cited by the organizing committee. The event is televised, with coverage in part serving the Mouride Brotherhood's proselytizing mission; video cassettes of the Magal are sold domestically and internationally as well.

== Dates of the Grand Magal of Touba ==
The date of the Grand Magal is determined by the Islamic calendar (known as the Hijri calendar), which is based on the lunar year. Each year, the events of the pilgrimage begin on the 18th of Safar and last for two days. Because the Islamic calendar is lunar and the Islamic year is about eleven days shorter than the Gregorian year, the date for the Grand Magal changes from year to year. Thus, each year in the Gregorian calendar, the pilgrimage starts eleven days (sometimes ten days) earlier than the preceding year. This makes it possible for the pilgrimage season to fall twice in one Gregorian year, and it does so every 33 years, most recently in 2013. The table below shows the Gregorian dates of the Grand Magal of recent years:

Year	Date (Gregorian calendar)
2011	22 January
2012	12 January
2013	1 January, 21 December
2014	11 December
2015	1 December
2016	19 November
2017	9 November
2018	27 October
2019	17 October
2020	6 October
2021	26 September
2022	14 September
2023	3 September
2024	22 August

== Rites and rituals ==
The Grand Magal is at once a ceremony and a festival, containing both religious rituals and entertainment. "No other event in Senegal, religious or secular, attracts as much attention", writes Villalón; it is "anticipated for weeks and generates a general effervescence." The rites of the pilgrimage bear similarities to those of the Islamic Hajj pilgrimage to Mecca: the two central events of the Magal are visits to the Great Mosque of Touba, which involves a partial circumambulation of the mosque, and to the mausoleum of Amadou Bamba, which is believed to be infused with the barakah, or spiritual power, of Bamba. Pilgrims pray with outstretched hands and touch the walls and doors of the mausoleum, and some drop coins inside the area around the tomb, which is fenced off. They may wait for over six hours for a few minutes of prayer at these locations.

Pilgrims also visit the mausoleums of other important Mouride leaders, many of whose tombs are located near the mosque. Other common sites to visit include the "Well of Mercy," said to have been created by God to flow for Cheikh Amadou Bamba, and the central library of Touba, which contains the many writings of the Cheikh and other influential Mourides. Lastly, pilgrims visit their personal Mouride spiritual guides, or marabouts. Each prominent Mouride marabout has a residence in the city from which he accepts visits. During the night, pilgrims gather to sing Arabic poetry (or qaṣāʾid) written by Bamba.

There is also a political dimension to the Grand Magal, in which the most prominent Mouride leaders - including the head of the Brotherhood, or Caliph General (currently Serigne Sidy Mokhtar Mbacké) – grant audiences to official government delegations and others of political importance. The tradition has roots in the colonial period, when it was created to defuse tension and demonstrate mutual recognition between the powerful Mourides and the French colonial government.

Informally, pilgrims also visit Touba's renowned marketplace, one of the biggest in the country. Because of the minimal government presence in the city (due to its religious character), business is conducted with little state regulation or oversight; a wide range of products can thus be found with prices lower than those of any other market in Senegal.

== Logistics and facilities ==
The large number of pilgrims in Touba during the Grand Magal demands an intense degree of organization and logistical management. Traffic jams and road accidents are common as heavy crowds descend on Touba each year; during the November 2016 Magal, 16 people were killed and 572 injured while travelling to the pilgrimage, according to the lieutenant-colonel of the National Fire Brigade.

In Touba, workers must act with a high degree of discipline, solidarity, and single-mindedness. The Mouride Baye Fall sect are the principle drivers of this effort and provide much of the logistical manpower. Additionally, different local associations of Mourides (called da'iras) are responsible for maintaining different pilgrimage sites and residents of Touba house and feed the pilgrims. The Senegalese government also provides some technical support, although this is generally kept to a minimum due to the religious nature of the event and site. In 2014, 1300 policemen and 160 healthcare workers were deployed to Touba during the Magal, and the army gave out bread rolls and coffee.

Preparations for the pilgrimage begin officially on 1 Safar each year, seventeen days prior to the pilgrimage, and are led by the Committee of Organization of the Grand Magal of Touba.

Special health measures were planned for the October 2020 pilgrimage because of the COVID-19 pandemic in Senegal.

== International presence ==
By the late 1970s, significant numbers of Mourides were living abroad; this presence has only grown with the intensifying globalization of the past decades. Community associations of disciples, known as dahiras (a Wolof term derived from the Arabic word for "circle"), have arisen in many international cities with robust Mouride communities: in 2011, researchers found 47 cities across western Europe and 16 cities in North America with active Mouride dahiras. According to Ross, "Murid dahiras abroad are intended as both extensions of, and conduits to, the holy city itself" and they organize celebrations of the Grand Magal annually.

In these gatherings, the singing of sacred Mouride poetry and watching of televised footage from Touba is especially important, as these practices connect expatriate Mourides to their spiritual brethren in Touba.
