= Great Mosque of Touba =

Mosque in Touba, Diourbel, Senegal

- الجامع الكبير في توبا; Grande Mosquée de Touba
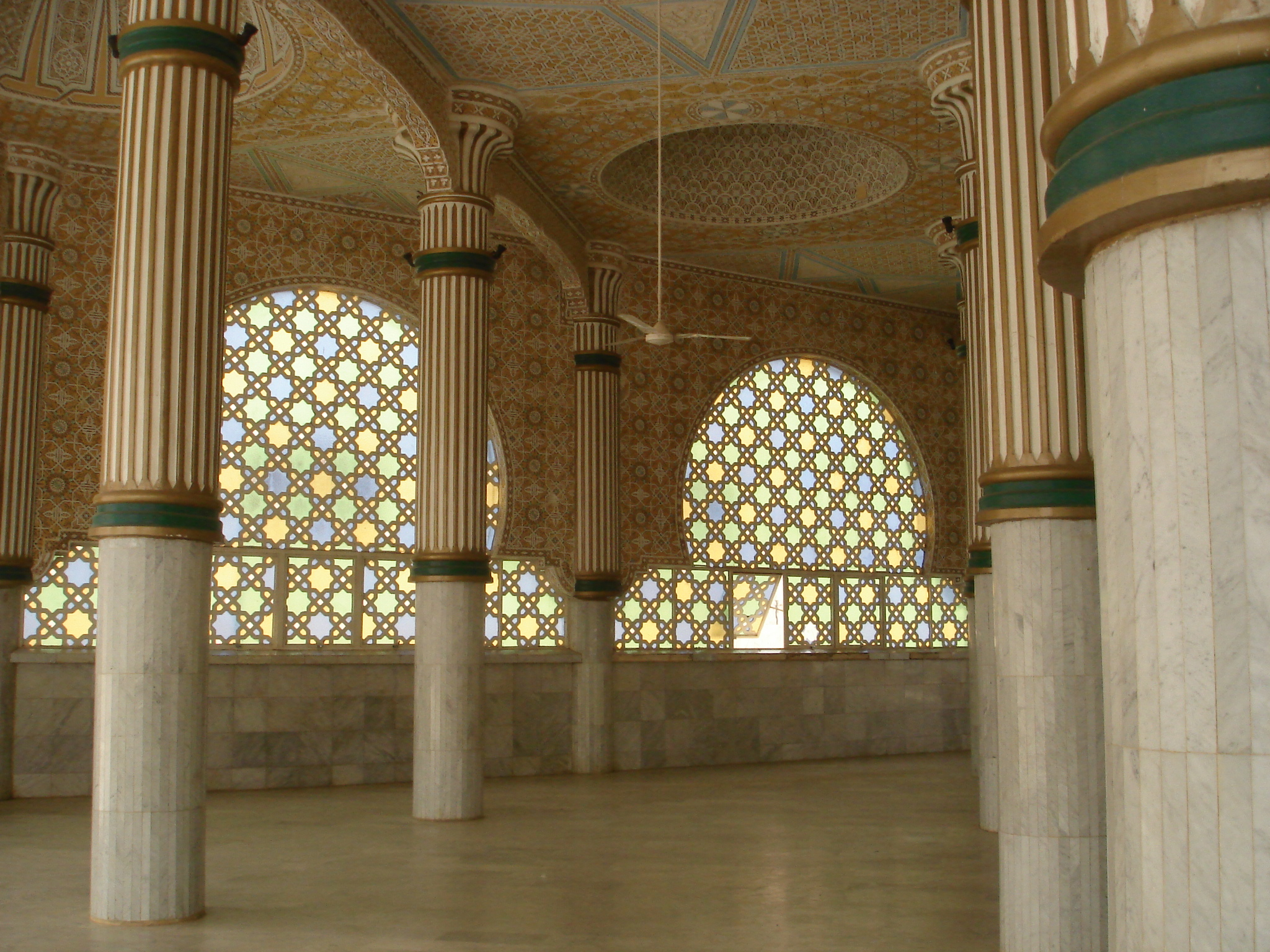

- Location within Senegal

Religion
- Affiliation: Sunni Islam
- Rite: Sufism
- Ecclesiastical or organisational status: Mosque
- Status: Active

Location
- Location: Touba, Diourbel
- Country: Senegal
- Interactive map of Great Mosque of Touba
- Coordinates: 14°51′47″N 15°52′32″W

Architecture
- Type: Mosque
- Founder: Ahmad Bamba
- Established: 1887 (as a congregation)
- Completed: 1963

Specifications
- Capacity: 7,000 worshipers
- Length: 100 m (330 ft)
- Width: 80 m (260 ft)
- Dome: 14
- Minaret: 7
- Minaret height: 96 m (315 ft) [Lamp Fall]

The Great Mosque of Touba (Arabic: الجامع الكبير في توبا; French: Grande Mosquée de Touba) is a mosque in Touba, Senegal. It was founded by Ahmadou Bamba in 1887 and completed in 1963. Bamba died in 1927 and was interred inside the mosque. Since his death the mosque has been controlled by his family. It is the largest building in the city and, prior to the construction of the Massalikoul Djinane Mosque in 2019, was one of the largest mosques in Africa, with a capacity of 7,000 worshipers. It is the site of a pilgrimage, the Grand Magal of Touba.

It is the home of the Mouride Brotherhood, a Sufi order, thus making it important to that order.

== History ==
The construction of the great mosque at Touba was conceived in the final years of Ahmad Bamba's life, around 1924–27. He also chose it as the location for his tomb. Senegal's French colonial rulers agreed to the scheme in 1926, albeit after some hesitation. Construction was delayed because of the misappropriation of the first round of funds and then, under the direction of Mamadu Mustafâ Mbacke, Bamba's son and successor, proceeded very slowly. In 1932, the foundations were completed; work paused in 1939–1947; and the building was inaugurated in 1963. Mamadu Mustafâ was also entombed there.

== Architecture ==
The mosque is 100 metres (330 ft) long and 80 metres (260 ft) wide. It has seven minarets, three large domes and eleven other domes, and two ablution chambers. The central minaret is 96 metres (315 ft) tall. The Great Minaret of the Great Mosque of Touba is also commonly referred to as Lamp Fall, which was named by the second Mouride caliph in honour of Ibrahima Fall (the founder of the Baye Fall community).

The immediate vicinity of the mosque houses the mausoleum of Ahmad Bamba's sons, the caliphs of the Mouride order. Other institutions in the center of the holy city include a library boasting 160,000 volumes, the Caliph's official audience hall, a sacred "Well of Mercy", and a cemetery.

== Gallery ==
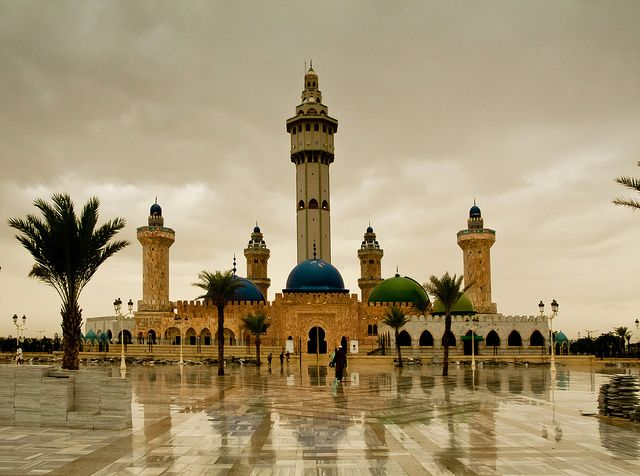

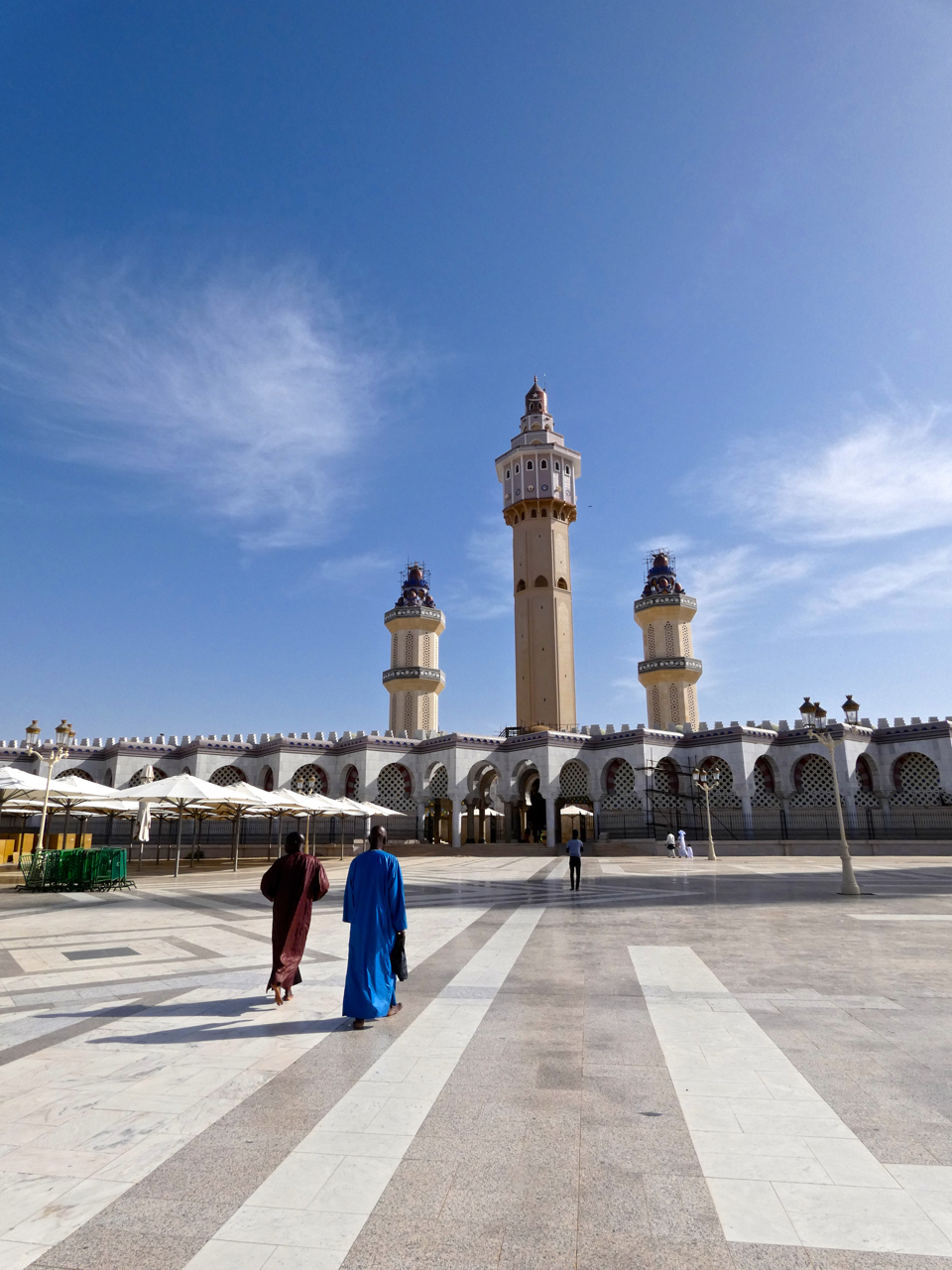

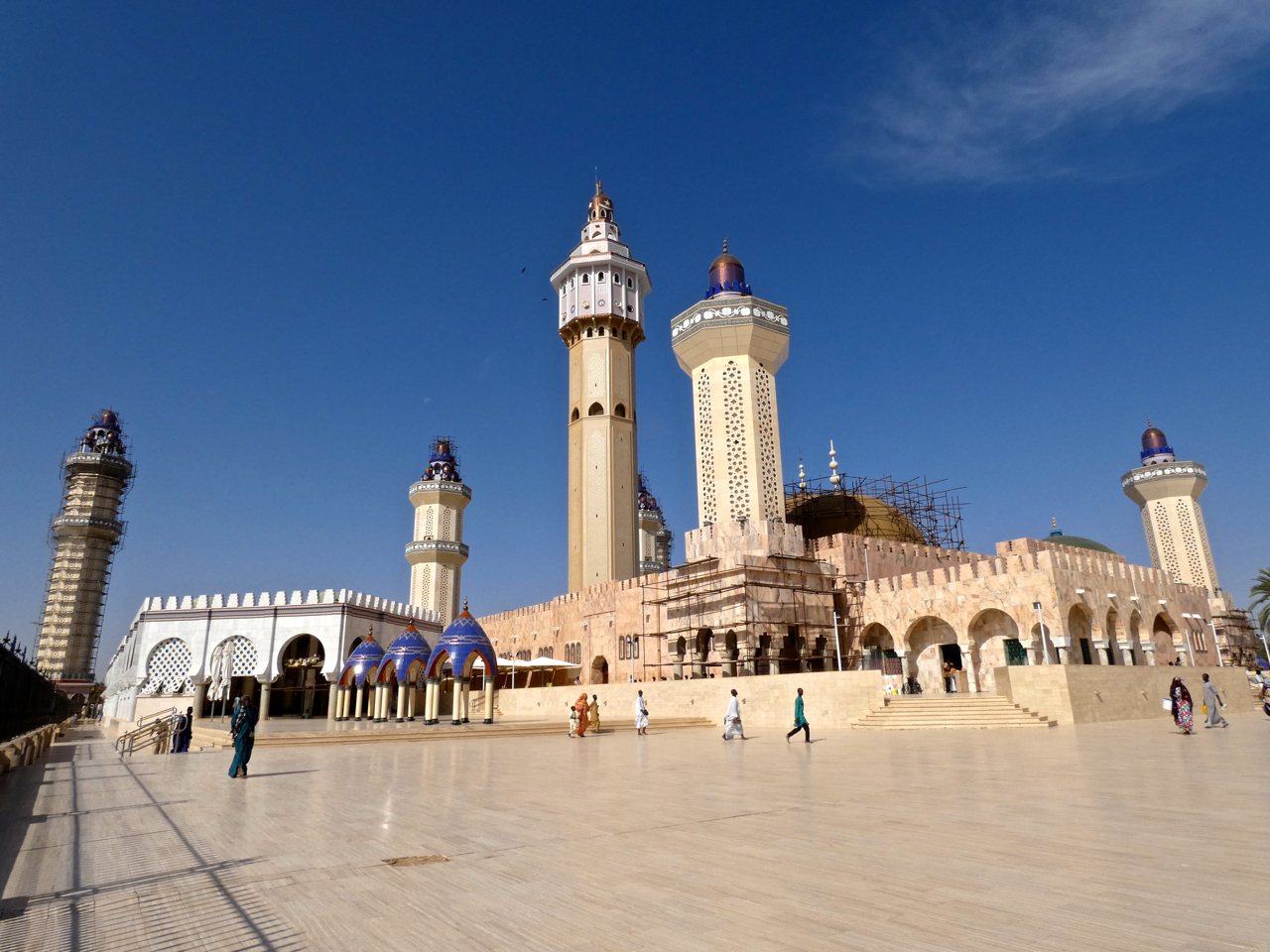

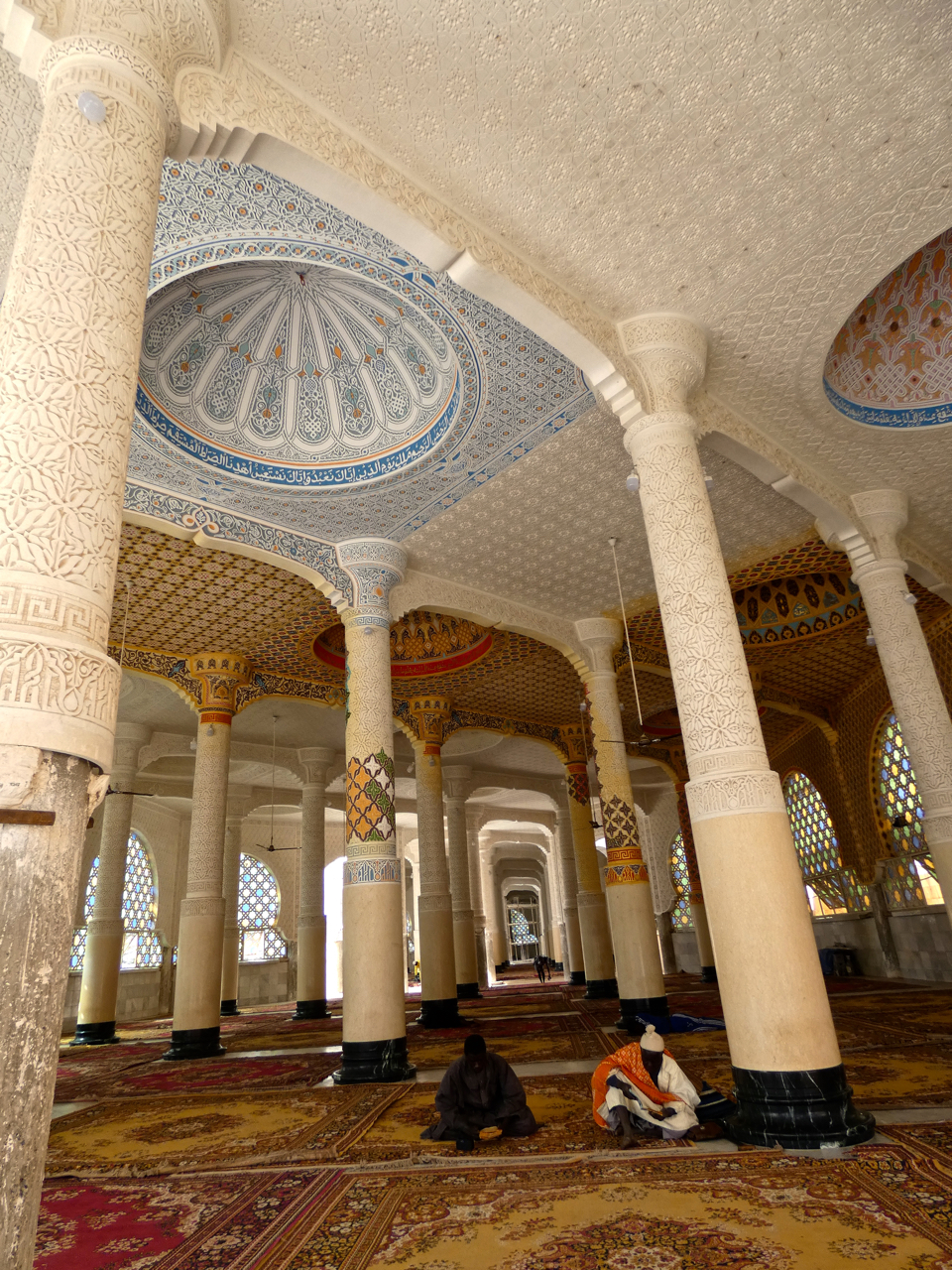

== See also ==
- Islam in Senegal
- List of mosques in Senegal
