= Ibrahima Fall =

Senegalese Sufi

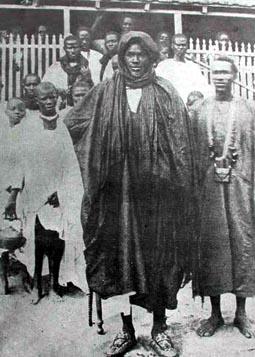
Ibrahima Fall

Sheikh Ibrahima Fall (1855–1930) was a disciple of Sheikh Aamadu Bàmba Mbàkke, founder of the Mouride Brotherhood movement in West Africa. Well known in the Mouride Brotherhood, Ibrahima Fall established the influential Baye Fall movement.

Neil Savishinsky (1994) contends that Sheikh Ibrahima Fall is “one of the first and most illustrious of Ahmadu Bamba’s disciples" out of 39 before him who gave allegiance to the sheikh. The Bimestriel Islamique (2000, December) claims that French West Africa called him the minister of economic affairs in the Mouridism. Ibrahima Fall catalysed the Mouride movement. Fall led all the labour work in the Mouride brotherhood. Fall reshaped the relation between Mouride Talibes (Mouride disciples) and their guide, Aamadu Bàmba Mbàkke. Fall instituted the culture of work among Mourides with his concept of Dieuf Dieul “you reap what you sow”.

Serigne Bassirou Mbacké, son of Sheikh Aamadu Bàmba Mbàkke, claims that Ibrahima Fall renovated the Mouride Brotherhood. According to Mbacké, Ibrahima Fall introduced giving money to Aamadu Bàmba. Mourides follow this practice of giving money to their sheikh. Serigne Moussa Kâ understands that “Fall initiated devoting ones life to his Sheikh in search of aura (Wolof tarbiya). Sheikh Diop (1980) confirms the great importance of Ibrahima Fall to Mouridism, stating that “Sheikh Ahmadou Bamba and Sheikh Ibrahima Fall realise the symbiosis of Mouride values, pray and work” .

== Origins ==
Ibrahima Fall belonged to an aristocratic Wolof family from Cayor. A scholar confirms that Fall came out of an animistically influenced Muslim tradition, but believes Fall's family was nevertheless prosperous and traditionally powerful in Cayor. Other sources contend that Fall's grandfather, the Damel Dethialaw, was a ruler of the Cayor kingdom.

=== Family and education ===
Ibrahima Fall was born around 1855 in a northern village, Ndiaby Fall, Cayor. His original tyeddo name was Yapsa Khanth Fall. Aamadu Bàmba Mbàkke later gave him the name Ibrahima Fall. Ibrahima Fall was a son of Amadou Rokhaya Fall and Seynabou Ndiaye. At an early age, Ibrahima Fall learned the Qur'an in a neighbouring village, Ndiaré. Fall achieved major Arabic sciences such as theology, fiqh, tafsir, grammar and rhetoric. Savishinsky (1994) tells us that Ibrahima Fall had “reputation for ferocity and extraordinary strength” (p. 212). Another scholar claims that Fall was viewed as a troubled man who seldom went with his peers and often remained alone in the bush. However, all agree that the turning point of his life was Fall's search for Shaikh Aamadu Bàmba Mbàkke.

== In Search of Aamadu Bàmba ==
One major study of Ibrahima Fall reports that two versions exist of his search for Shaikh Aamadu Bàmba. In the first version, Fall is rich merchant who travelled in Cayor, Jolof and Saloum. But after meeting Aamadu Bàmba Mbàkke in Mbacké Bari, Fall gave up business to become Bamba's disciple.

In the second version, which is more commonly believed in Senegal, Ibrahima Fall in 1882 went on looking to Aamadu Bàmba Mbàkke. Scholars state that Ibrahima Fall knew that his destiny dictated him to search for him. Without any knowledge of him, Ibrahima Fall went on looking for the best Muslim teachers. Ibrahima Fall tested Serigne Massamba Syll and after Serigne Adama Gueye. Adama Gueye conducted Ibrahima Fall through mystic ways to Aamadu Bàmba Mbàkke in 1883.

== Pact with Aamadu Bàmba Mbàkke ==
The encounter between Ibrahima Fall and Aamadu Bàmba Mbàkke defined the beginning of Mouridism. Savishinsky claims “Fal (Ibra Faal) performed his obeisance to Ahmadu Bamba in crown-slave style disrobing and falling forward to the ground." Serigne Bassirou (1995) narrates the famous speech that Ibrahima Fall and Ahmadou Bamba exchanged:

Ibrahima Fall: “If I found only your gravestone, be aware that the force of my intention would satisfy my objective”

Sheikh Ahmadou Bamba: “If I found only the stars and the sky that Muhammad watched at, I’m sure that I could attain my objective with my strong love of the prophet [...] Know that from this life, I’ll neither protect you from sun nor provide you material goods. I accept you if you follow God recommendations”.

In this way, the contract started between Fall and Aamadu Bàmba Mbàkke. Ibrahima Fall became his 40th disciple. From this moment, Fall followed the Ndiguel "orders" of the Shaikh until Fall's death.

== Introduction of Mouride Values ==
Within this contract called “Diebelou”, Savishinsky claims that Ibrahima Fall displayed an absolute, slave-like devotion to his master. His “pastef” (courage and devotion) served example for all Mourides. In fact, Fall started “growing food, cutting firewood, fetching water and building shelters and mosques” (p. 213). Likewise, Serigne Moussa Kâ tells us that Fall reshaped quickly the relation between a disciple and his guide. Ibrahima Fall instituted five rules of deference to the Sheikh:

1. Never stand at the same level than Aamadu Bàmba Mbàkke
2. Never greet the Shaikh with your hat on your head
3. Never walk in front of him
4. Always do the “sudiot” (kiss his hands) with the Shaikh
5. Always lower your voice in front of him

Ibrahima Fall himself supervised these rules.

== Contribution to Aamadu Bàmba's mission ==
In 1890, Shaikh Aamadu Bàmba nominated Fall the third responsible in the Mouride Brotherhood. Fall had to supervise all manual works. With the exile of Aamadu Bàmba Mbàkke, Fall's life changed. He moved to Saint-Louis, Senegal, to defend the innocence of his Shaikh. During Fall's negotiations with the French, Paul Marty recognised that Fall hid great intelligence. Another scholar cites the multiple Arabic poems of Ibrahima Fall to prove Fall's intellectualism. Fall wrote also an Arabic book, Jazbul Mouride.

=== Exile of Aamadu Bàmba Mbàkke ===
On 21 September 1895, the French exiled Aamadu Bàmba to Gabon. Aamadu Bàmba ordered Ibrahima Fall to work for Sherif Hassan. He did so until 1901, when Sherif Hassan died. In this interval (1895–1901), Fall kept sending money (in Wolof “Adiya”) to the Shaikh until his return in 1902. On 11 November 1902, Aamadu Bàmba Mbàkke returned to Senegal and awarded Ibrahima Fall the degree of Sheikh.

=== Return of Aamadu Bàmba ===
In June 1912, the French kept Aamadu Bàmba under house arrest in Ndjarèem, Diourbel. Consequently, Sheikh Ibrahima Fall followed him to Diourbel. In Diourbel, Fall created a famous district, Keur Sheikh. In Keur Sheikh, the Baye Fall movement consolidated and expanded very quickly. Many tyeddos became his disciples. In 1925, the French banned construction of the Touba Mosque. Sheikh Ibrahima Fall enclosed the area of the mosque with timbers Fall carried from Ndjarèem to Touba.

In 1927, at the death of Aamadu Bàmba Mbàkke, Sheikh Ibrahima Fall performed among the first obeisance to the Shaikh's son, Serigne Moustapha Mbacké. Sheikh Ibrahima Fall participated in the difficult creation of the railroads between Diourbel and Touba. Sheikh Ibrahima Fall died 9 June 1930 after helping the succession of Aamadu Bàmba. He lies in Touba.

== Recognition by the Mouride Brotherhood ==
Sheikh Ibrahima Fall obviously helped Shaikh Aamadu Bàmba Mbàkke to expand Mouridism, particularly with Fall's establishment of the Baye Fall movement. For this contribution, Serigne Fallou (2nd Caliph after Aamadu Bàmba) named him “Lamp Fall" (the light of Mouridism). In addition, Ibrahima Fall earned the title of “Babul Mouridina”, meaning "Gate of Mouridism".
