= Serigne Mountakha Mbacké =

Senegalese religious caliph

Khalif of the Mouride Brotherhood
- Incumbent
- Assumed office January 2018
- Preceded by: Serigne Sidi Moukhtar Mbacké

Personal details
- Born: 1930 (age 95–96) Senegal

Serigne Mountakha Mbacké (born 1930) is the current, and eighth, Khalif of the Mouride brotherhood, a large Sufi order based in Senegal. He assumed office in January 2018 after the death of the seventh Khalif, Serigne Sidi Moukhtar Mbacké. He is the oldest grandson of the founder of the brotherhood, Sheikh Ahmadou Bamba, who died in 1927, and the son of Serigne Mouhamadou Bassirou Mbacké ibn Khadim Rassoul.
