= Mouride Order =

Sufi mystic order in Sunni Islam

Coordinates: 14.8667°N 15.8667°W

The Mouride order (Wolof: yoonu murit, Arabic: الطريقة المريدية, romanized: aṭ-Ṭarīqat al-Murīdiyyah), also called the Mouridiyyah (Arabic: المريدية), is a Sufi order (tariqa) most prominent in Senegal and The Gambia with headquarters in the city of Touba, which is a holy city for the order.

Adherents are called Mourides, from murīd (مُرِيد, 'one who seeks'), a term used generally in Sufism to designate a disciple of a spiritual guide. The beliefs and practices of the Mourides constitute Mouridism. Mouride disciples call themselves taalibé in Wolof and must undergo a ritual of allegiance called njebbel, as it is considered highly important to have a sheikh, "spiritual guide," to become a Mouride.

The Mouride brotherhood was founded in 1883 in Senegal by Amadou Bamba. The Mouride order is particularly popular among the Wolof community and a significant amount of the population of Senegal follow the order, and their influence over everyday life can be seen throughout Senegal.

== History ==
=== Founding ===
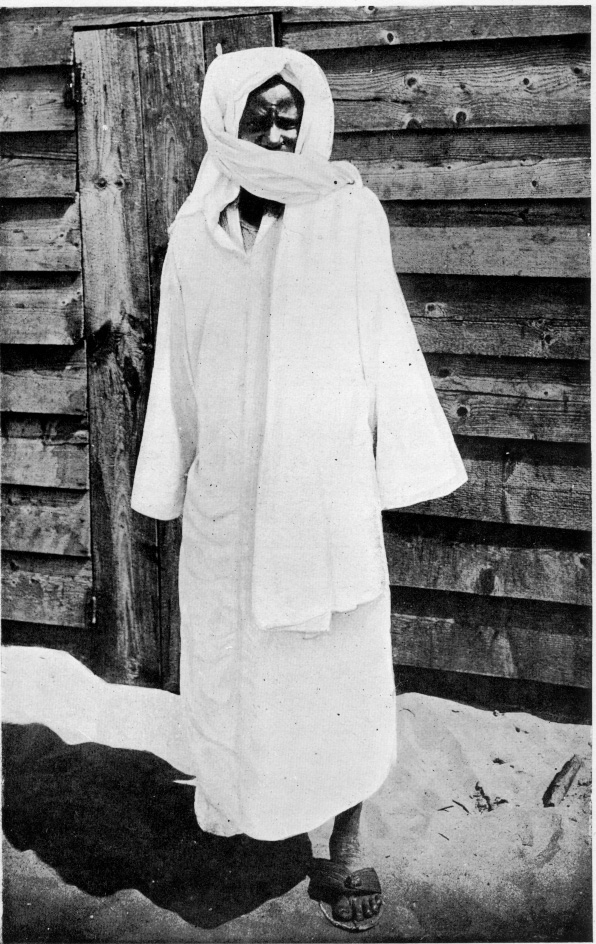
Amadou Bamba

The Mouride brotherhood was established in 1883 in Senegal by Shaykh Aḥmadu Bàmba Mbàkke (Wolof name), commonly known as Amadou Bamba (1850–1927). In Arabic, he is known as Aḥmad ibn Muhammad ibn Habīb Allāh or by the nickname "Khadīmu r-Rasūl" ("Servant of the Prophet"). In Wolof, he is called "Sëriñ Tuubaa" ("Holy Man of Touba"). He was born in the village of Mbacké in Baol, the son of a sheikh from the Qadiriyya, the oldest of the Muslim brotherhoods in Senegal.

Amadou Bamba was a Muslim mystic and ascetic marabout, a spiritual leader who wrote tracts on meditation, rituals, work, and tafsir. He is perhaps best known for his emphasis on work, and his disciples are known for their industriousness. Although he did not support the French conquest of West Africa, he did not wage outright war on them, as several prominent Tijani sheikh had done. He taught, instead, what he called the jihād al-akbar or "greater struggle", which was fought not through weapons but through learning and fear of God.

Bamba's followers call him a mujaddid (a "renewer of Islam"). Bamba's fame spread through his followers, and people joined him to receive the salvation that he promised. Salvation, he said, comes through submission to the sheikh and hard work.

There is only one surviving photograph of Amadou Bamba, in which he wears a flowing white Senegalese kaftan, and his face is covered by a headscarf. This picture is venerated and reproduced in paintings on walls, buses, taxis, and other private and public spaces all over modern-day Senegal.

=== French colonial rule ===
At the time of the foundation of the Mouride brotherhood in 1883, the French were in control of Senegal as well as most of West and North Africa. Although it had shared in the pre-colonial slave trade, French West Africa was considered managed relatively better than other African regions during the Scramble for Africa and ensuing colonial era . Senegal enjoyed small measures of self-rule in many areas. However, French rule still discouraged the development of local industry, preferring to force the exchange of raw materials for European finished goods, and a large number of taxation measures were instituted.

French West Africa around 1913.

At the end of the 19th century, French colonial authorities began to worry about the growing power of the Mouride brotherhood and its potential to resist French colonialism. Bamba, who had converted various kings and their followers, could probably have raised an army against the French had he wanted. Fearful of his power, the French sentenced Bamba to exile in Gabon (1895–1902) and later Mauritania (1903–1907) and confined him to house arrest in Senegal until 1912.

However, Bamba's exile fueled legends about his miraculous ability to survive torture, deprivation, and attempted executions, and thousands more flocked to his organization. For example, on the ship to Gabon, forbidden from praying, Bamba is said to have broken his leg-irons, leapt overboard into the ocean, and prayed on a prayer rug that miraculously appeared on the surface of the water. In addition, when the French put him in a furnace, he is said to have simply sat down and had tea with Muhammad. In a den of hungry lions, it is said the lions slept beside him.

The Great Mosque of Touba, Senegal

By 1912, policy shifted towards using the Senegalese Sufi orders – among them the Mourides – as assets in the colonial administration. This way, it was thought, the authority and power of the orders could instead be used to support colonial rule. In order to facilitate rapprochement and in an attempt to limit the appearance of Bamba as a freedom fighter, he was released from house arrest and moved back to Diourbel, close to the future site of Touba. The Mouride doctrine of hard work served French economic interests, as addressed below. After World War I, the Mouride brotherhood was allowed to grow, and in 1926, Bamba began work on the Great Mosque in Touba, where he would be buried one year later.

Bamba’s successors were increasingly cordial with the French administration, collaborating and receiving support against rivals and material benefits such as land and machinery in return. This led to the brotherhood’s authority becoming part of a form of indirect rule by the French. In 1928, the French colonial administration issued a deed recognizing the land of Bamba’s tomb and the Great Mosque as private property of the Mouride community. This marked the first step towards Touba’s autonomy from the wider Senegalese state, which continued post-independence.

The Mourides played a central role in the 1958 Senegalese constitutional referendum, which determined whether Senegal would become part of the new French Community. The leaders of the main Senegalese Sufi orders jointly pledged their loyalty to Charles de Gaulle and supported the proposed French Community. Their campaigning, supported by the French Administration, led to the overwhelming yes of nearly 98% being coined “the marabouts’ Yes.”

== Structure ==
=== Leadership ===
Shaikh Amadou Bamba was buried in 1927 at the Great Mosque of Touba in the holy city of Mouridism and the heart of the Mouride movement. After his death, Bamba was succeeded by his descendants as hereditary leaders of the brotherhood. The caliph (leader) of the Mouride brotherhood is known as the Grand Marabout and has his seat in Touba. The first five caliphs were all sons of Amadou Bamba, starting with his eldest son:

1. Serigne Mouhamadou Moustapha Mbacké, caliph from 1927 to 1945
2. Serigne Mouhamadou Fallilou Mbacké, caliph from 1945 to 1968
3. Serigne Abdou Ahad Mbacké, caliph from 1968 to 1989
4. Serigne Abdou Khadr Mbacké, caliph from 1989 to 1990
5. Serigne Saliou Mbacké (1915-2007), caliph from 1990 until his death on December 28, 2007
6. Serigne Mouhamadou Lamine Bara Mbacké, (1925–2010), caliph from 2007 to 2010. He was the first grandson of Ahmadou Bamba to become caliph.
7. Serigne Sidi Moukhtar Mbacké, caliph from July 1, 2010, until his death on January 9, 2018.
8. Serigne Mountakha Mbacké, incumbent caliph since January 10, 2018.

The Grand Marabout is a direct descendant of Amadou Bamba himself and is considered the spiritual leader of all Mourides. There are other marabouts, each with a regional following.

=== Dahiras ===
Dahiras are a unique institution of the Senegalese Sufi model which connect followers of a particular marabout or order in an association. They are often based on shared allegiances to a particular marabout or common geographical location, for example, a neighborhood or city-specific dahira. Other dahiras bring together followers belonging to the same age, gender, occupation, or school, linking them across Senegal and even abroad. A key example of this is the Hizbut-Tarqiyyah, which brought together Mouride students and alumni of the University of Dakar. Notably, many Mouride dahiras name the Grand Marabout as their patron and thereby avoid allegiance to a specific marabout inside the order.

Dahiras first appeared in urban areas as religious solidarity and mutual aid groups to tackle the issues of urban migrants, but have since spread across the country to rural areas as well. Next to providing a community of like-minded Mourides, they help facilitate the participation of members at important festivals and help raise funds for sudden expenses which individuals may be unable to cover themselves, such as funeral costs.

=== Daaras ===
Daaras are the name of Quranic schools (madrasas) that were originally founded by the shaykh, his descendants, or disciples to teach the Quran and the qasida (قصيدة), pronounced khassida (Wolof: xassida), poems honoring Muhammad, as well as cultivating the land. Hence, they have grown to be associations of Mourides, generally based on shared allegiance to a particular marabout.

=== Sects ===
==== Baye Fall ====
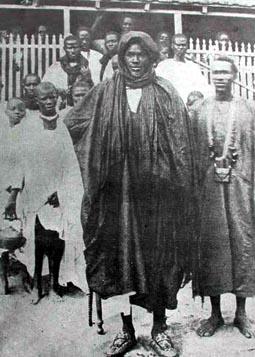
Ibrahima Fall

One famous disciple of Bamba, Ibrahima Fall, was known for his dedication to God and considered work as a form of adoration. Fall was the one to introduce the conduct with which a disciple should interact with his Shaykh, based on the example of the Sahabas and concepts presented in the 49th chapter of the Quran Al-Hujurat. Ibrahima Fall was responsible for guiding many of Bamba's more eccentric followers and new converts to Islam. His followers were the precursor to a subgroup of the Mouride brotherhood today referred to as the Baye Fall (Wolof: Baay Faal), many of whom substitute hard labor and dedication to their marabout for the usual Muslim pieties.

Sheikh Ibrahima Fall was one of the first of Amadou Bamba's disciples and one of the most illustrious. He catalysed the Mouride movement and led all the labour work in the Mouride brotherhood. Fall reshaped the relation between Mouride talibes (disciples) and their guide, Amadou Bamba. Fall instituted the culture of work among Mourides with his concept of Dieuf Dieul ("you reap what you sow"). Ibra Fall helped Amadou Bamba to expand Mouridism, in particular with Fall's establishment of the Baye Fall movement. For this contribution, Serigne Fallou, the second Caliph (leader) after Amadou Bamba, named him "Lamp Fall" (the light of Mouridism). In addition, Ibrahima Fall earned the title Bab al-Murīdīna (باب المريدين, 'Gate of the Mourides').

The members of the Baye Fall dress in colorful ragged clothes, wear their hair in dreadlocks which are called ndiange ("strong hair"), which they usually decorate with homemade beads, wire, or string. They also carry clubs and act as security guards in the annual Grand Magal pilgrimages to Touba. Women usually are covered in wrappers, including their heads, and occasionally are known to wear highly decorative handmade jewelry made from household or natural items. In modern times, hard labor is often replaced by members roaming the streets asking for financial donations for their marabout. Several Baye Fall are talented musicians. A prominent member of the Baye Fall is the Senegalese musician Cheikh Lô.

== Beliefs ==
=== The Three Pillars of Mouridism ===
Sheikh Ahmadou Bamba taught the Three Pillars of Mouridism:

- Islam by Fiqh
- Iman by The Six Articles of Faith
- Ihsan by Tasawwuf (Sufism)

In summary, a Mouride aspires to achieve Islam by following the basic recommendations of Shariat. This includes (but is not limited to) performing individual obligations (Fard Ayn) such as prayer, ablution, fasting, pilgrimage, and giving charity. A Mouride aspires to achieve Iman by the Six Articles of Faith: Belief in God, his angels, the prophets, the revealed Holy Books, the Day of Judgment, and the Divine Decree. A Mouride aspires to achieve Ihsan by the path of Tasawwuf (Sufism) through taking initiation (Bayat) with a Sheikh of the Tariqat.

=== The Mouride Triangle ===
Additionally to the Three Pillars of Mouridism, the Mourides follow what is called the Mouride Triangle:

- Love: Love for Allâh and his Cheikhs
- Service: Work for Allâh and service for humanity
- Knowledge: With Love and Work over time follows divine light of Allah and knowledge directly to the heart

=== Renewer of Islam (Mujaddid) ===
Amadou Bamba is considered a mujaddid (renewer of Islam) by his followers, citing a hadith that implies that God will send renewers of the faith every 100 years. The members of all the Senegalese brotherhoods claim that their founders were such renewers. The Mouride beliefs are based on Quranic and Sufi traditions and influenced by the Qadiri and Tijani brotherhoods, as well as the works by the scholar al-Ghazali. Amadou Bamba wrote more than 1000 books in Classical Arabic, all of which are based on the Quran and Hadith. Ahmadou Bamba said, "If it's not in the Qur'an or Hadith, it's not from me". Mourides sometimes call their order the "Way of Imitation of the Prophet". Parents sometimes send their sons to live with the marabout as talibes rather than giving them a conventional education. These boys receive Islamic training and are instilled with the doctrine of hard work.

Many Mourides consider the city of Touba to be holy and extremely important. Pilgrims regularly come to Touba all year round, but the peak of the year is a mass pilgrimage called the Grand Màgal, which celebrates Bamba's return from exile.

=== Relationship with Reform Movement ===
As in other parts of West Africa and the wider Muslim world, the return of students from the Salafist and Wahhabist-influenced Islamic universities in the Middle East brought a new Islamic revivalist movement to Senegal post-Second World War. As these movements rejected many of the Sufi traditions and foundations that marked Islam in West Africa, and had been linked to the idea of an “Islam noir” by French colonial administrators, they opposed the marabouts, their cooperation with the French colonial system, and their authoritarian position inside Senegal’s religious system. The Mourides’ strong economic position and political influence (see below), system of unconditional submission to their marabouts, and focus on labour over prayer, made them a natural target of the reformers. The importance of marabouts and saints in Mouride thought was seen as shirk. This also extended to locations, with reformers opposing the central role of the holy city of Touba and the Mouride tradition of spending significant amounts of money to transport dead relatives to be buried in the city. On a more popular level, the eccentricities of the Baye Fall have also been associated with the Mourides as a whole and have been used to criticise them by various non-Mourides.

However, the central role of Mourides in Senegal has meant that even some Salafist-inspired reform movements have, over time, softened anti-maraboutic stances in order to focus on other issues, at times even cooperating with notable Mourides in order to gain popular support and pursue goals appealing to most Muslims. Other types of reform have come from inside the Mouride order, with younger marabouts drawing inspiration from reformists and West African Pentecostalism. They combine these inspirations with aspects of traditional Mouride beliefs, offering new forms of worship removed from the gerontocratic traditional order and incorporating modern media while calling for a return to a mythologised Mouride past of rejecting authority. These interactions and new movements highlight Islamic Studies professor Rüdiger Seeseman’s argument that rather than treating Sufism and reform Islam as unchanging and opposed, these movements interact and lead to new forms of thoughts which incorporate beliefs to best address the situations they find themselves in.

== Influence in Senegal ==
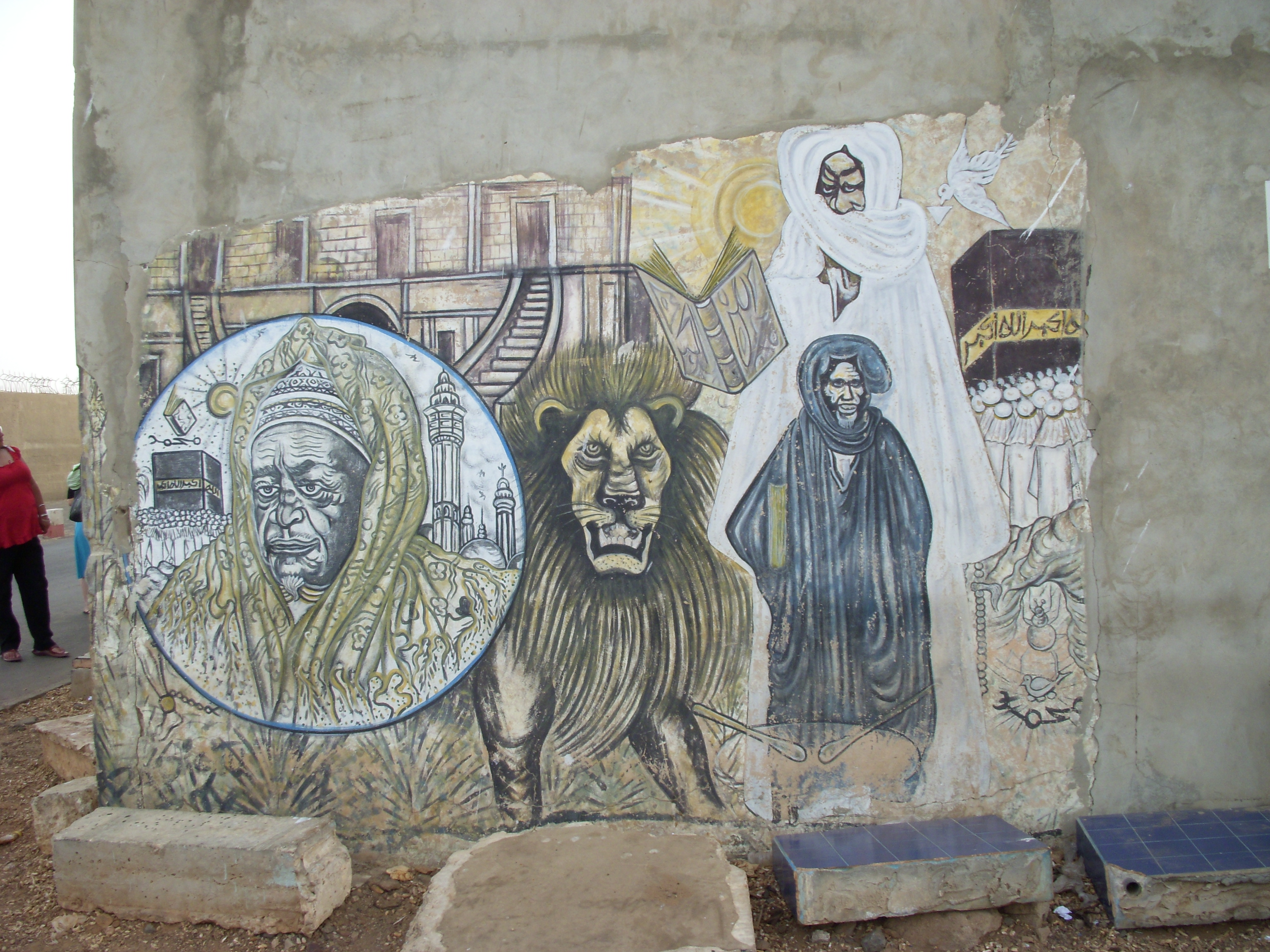
Mural on a wall in Dakar, Senegal, showing Amadou Bamba, Ibrahima Fall and Serigne Falllou.

=== Political influence ===
The Mourides have wielded significant political influence on the national and local scales for most of their history. In a 1965 survey, elite Senegalese named Mouride Grand Marabout Fallilou Mbacké as the second most influential person in the country. Since then, the order has been described as having played a major role in fostering consent for government policies, and as being important political power brokers. As part of the njebbel, a loyal Mouride is ideologically required to follow his religious leaders’ instructions, or he risks losing any material support that would have been given to him if he disregards them.

Marabouts very rarely participate directly in the political process. What is more common is to see them exert their influence over their followers and use this in return to gain a larger presence in Senegalese politics. Such things as withholding seed from granaries, unless followers purchase party cards, is a way that some marabouts exert their influence in the region to attain votes. Other marabouts may actually seek out political office, but most prefer to use their influence as an intermediary of politics in Senegal.

As noted above, following a period of repression, French colonial administrators recognized that the Mouride brotherhood was well-respected among the Senegalese and partnered with them to promote political and social order. Traditional Wolof aristocrats had proven problematic as intermediaries for the colonial authorities, and they hoped that Mouride leaders would be more effective and legitimate.

During the French colonial reign, the marabouts usually gave their support to politicians based on their support of the brotherhood's leaders and interests. The most notable of these was Blaise Diagne, whose successful campaign to the Chamber of Deputies in 1914 they subsidized. Together with the continued cooperation with the colonial administration, this successful partnership built the foundation for the future cooperation between the Senegalese government and the Mouride brotherhood. This was further strengthened by the close alliance with Léopold Senghor, who had courted the Mourides and other Sufi orders from early on. Senghor campaigned on stabilizing the price of groundnuts, vital to Mouride economic interests (see below), and promised to subsidize the completion of the Grand Mosque of Touba. In this way, Senghor gained the electoral support of the Mourides while the order and the Grand Marabout benefited from investments in Touba’s infrastructure and the symbolic power of state support.

After universal suffrage was given in 1956, Senegal saw a rapid increase in the number of voters, almost triple the number just 10 years prior. This swift increase meant more power for the marabout whose outreach spread largely over the rural and peasant communities, which now had the opportunity to vote. Because of the 'marabouts' far-reaching influence in Senegal, politicians made a considerable effort to attain the support of these religious leaders for their personal advancement.

In order to attain their support in elections, bribes and material incentives were given to marabouts from political parties and potential candidates. Many believed that no party could hope to attain political power if the marabouts were completely opposed to it, and any party that rose to power had to comply with the Marabout's demands or lose their political support.

In the 1962 power clash between now-President Senghor and Prime Minister Mamadou Dia, the Mourides again played a notable role. Dia was supported by Salafiyya-inspired urban Reform movements, which opposed the Mourdides’ collaboration with the colonial system and maraboutic influence. In line with these concerns, Dia had previously opposed the marabouts’ political influence through a number of agricultural reforms. Mouride leaders’ support lay squarely with Senghor, and Dia could muster little popular support among the rural population who followed their marabouts’ loyalties. This unwavering support of Senghor continued until Fallilou Mbacké died in 1968, after which relations with the government cooled.

Support for the government returned with Senghor’s successor, Abdou Diouf, who in 1980 again allocated funds to infrastructure projects in Touba and afforded the city more autonomy. While the effects of this are contested, the Grand Marabout did issue a forceful njebbel in support of Diouf for the 1988 elections, according to which failure to vote for him amounted to betrayal of Cheick Amadou Bamba’s will. However, this move was unpopular with many Mourides, and later led to a retreat from national politics by the position of the Grand Marabout.

The public perception of Mourides’ involvement in the highest level of politics changed with the election of Abdoulaye Wade in 2000. A devout Mouride, Wade travelled to Touba the day after his election to seek the blessing of the Grand Marabout, Serigne Saliou Mbacké. Wade pledged financial support for the Mourides and included notable Mourides in his government, securing public support of notable Mourides – however, not that of the Grand Marabout. This support allowed Wade to cultivate the Mourides as a solid bloc of support.

The Party for Truth and Development, founded by Ahmadou Kara Mbacké, a descendant of Ahmadou Bamba, marked the entry of an explicitly Mouride organisation into organised politics, with Kara reportedly also targeting a presidential run but being discouraged by his relatives.

=== Economic influence ===
Groundnuts are the third largest export from Senegal after fish and phosphates. The amount of groundnut crop which the Mourides produce has been estimated to range from one-third to three-quarters of Senegalese groundnut production, although others have now estimated it to equal around one-half of the national total of groundnuts produced. This partnership between the Brotherhood and the government stems from the French colonial administrators, who had viewed the production of groundnuts by the Mourides as a means of economic advantage through the increasing production of crops for export.

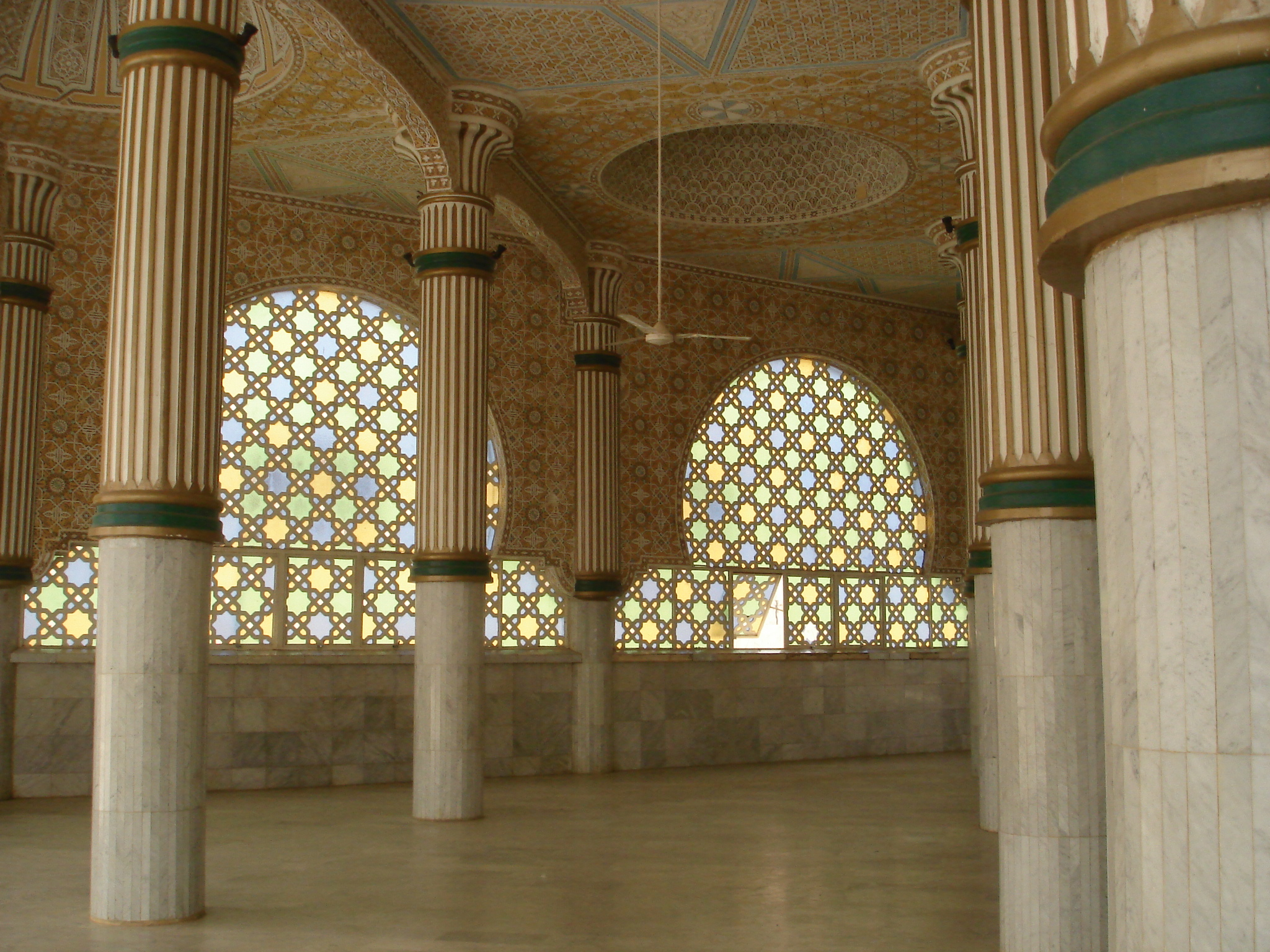
Interior of the Great Mosque

Due to this high proportion of groundnut crop produced by the Mouride, the brotherhood has always seemed to have a large influence on the groundnut market and the economy. Economic involvement is in fact encouraged by the religious leaders to their disciples through the use of ideology that places great value on the production labor which is performed in the service of God. Thus the Mourides devoted themselves to prayer and unpaid agricultural labor in service to their religious leaders. They cultivated the marabout's fields for a decade and then returned all land profits earned from the groundnut production. After ten years of dedicated work, laborers then received a share of land (large estates were divided up among the laborers). They continued to turn a share of their agricultural output over to their spiritual guide, as groundnut production was the community's only means of sustenance.

The large share of the Mourides' control over the groundnut production has placed them at the center of the nation's economy. The government's economic planners, in turn, have kept the brotherhood in their minds when establishing policies about groundnut production. Although the government places importance on the Mouride cultivators, the disciples do not have efficient ways of cultivating groundnuts, and their techniques are often destructive to the land. Rather than looking out for the best use of the land, the Mouride cultivators are more interested in a fast payback. The methods used by the marabout have led to a constant depletion of the forests in Senegal and have taken much of the nutrients out of the soil. Government agencies have made attempts to help the marabout become more efficient in groundnut production, such as providing incentives for the workers to slow down their production.

Because of their emphasis on work, the Mouride brotherhood is economically well-established in parts of Africa, especially in Senegal and The Gambia. In Senegal, the brotherhood controls significant sections of the nation's economy, for example, the transportation sector and the peanut plantations. Ordinary followers donate part of their income to the Mouridiyyah.

=== Cultural influence ===
Islam is central to the political sociology of Senegal: the religious elite carry great weight in national politics; political discourse is replete with references and appeals to Islam. There is virtually no opposition to the principle of the secular state; socio-political cleavages based on religion, whether between Muslim and non-Muslim or between Sufi orders, are also virtually non-existent. Within Muslim discourse, we find constant reference to such concepts as Islamic government, Islamic economics, or Islamic social order. The essential Islamic core lies in the shared belief in the fundamental unity of the Muslim world. The sense of belonging to a larger community, felt by many Muslims, is reinforced by the common use of Arabic as the language of prayer and religious learning.

Islam is a powerful mobilization instrument and provides the rhetoric for the formulation of ideological movements, and serves as a force for mobilizing people in the pursuit of goals defined by those movements. The role of local Islamic social structures, the nature of leadership and the relations between leaders and followers, the nature and sources of power and authority and the limits and constraints of the economy are all factors, which mediate and direct the impact of Islam on Politics. Senegalese elites have not found appeals to ethnic solidarity a productive means of building a mass following. Common religious affiliation has played a role in defusing the potential for tensions that arise from other social cleavages. There, however, remains a potential for ethnic and caste divides to enter the Senegalese socio-political organization.

The Senegalese have a mystical aspect to Islam, much like other Sufi brotherhoods. In Senegal, Islamic practice usually requires membership in religious brotherhoods that are dedicated to the marabouts of these groups. Marabouts are believed to be the mediators between Allah and the people. The people seek the help of marabouts for protection from the evil spirits, to improve one's status (in terms of career, love or relationship, finances etc.), to obtain a cure or remedy for sickness, or even to curse an enemy. Marabouts are believed to have the ability to deal with the spirit world and seek the spirits’ help in things impossible for humans. The spirits’ help is sought since they are thought to be a source of much baraka "blessings, divine grace".

The marabouts of the Mouride Brotherhood devote less time to study and teaching than other brotherhoods. They devote most of their time to ordering their disciples’ work and making amulets for their disciples' work and making amulets for their followers. Devout Mourides’ homes and workplaces are covered with pictures and sayings of their marabout, and they wear numerous amulets prepared by them. These acts are believed to bring them a better life and solve their problems as well. Even taxi and bus drivers fill their vehicles with stickers, paintings, and photos of the marabouts of their particular brotherhoods.

The marabout-talibe relationship in Senegal is essentially a relationship of personal dependence. It can be a charismatic or a clientelistic relationship. In a charismatic relationship, demonstrations of devotion and abnegation towards the marabouts can only be explained because their talibes see them as intercessors or even intermediaries with God. This charismatic relationship is reinforced and complemented by a parallel clientelistic relationship between marabout and follower. The results are that marabouts are expected to provide certain material benefits to their follower in addition to the spiritual ones.

This patronage function has been important in the distribution of land, especially during periods of expanding peanut cultivation. Mouride social organization was developed in the context of the expanding peanut economy, and its unique formulation was adapted to the economic imperatives of that context. The most distinctive institutional expression of Mouride agro-religious innovation is the daara, an agricultural community of young men in the service of a marabout. These collective farms were largely responsible for the expansion of peanut cultivation. A Mouride peasant may submit to a marabout's organization of agricultural work because it is the best option available to him, independently of the ideology which supports it.

In contrast to a vision of masses blindly manipulated by a religious elite, the ties of talibes to their marabouts are frequently far more contingent and tenuous than assumed. As a result, marabouts confront the problem of recruiting and retaining followers. People, at times, confront a choice of which marabout to follow, the level of attachment to that marabout, and the domains or situations in which to follow him. While there is a widespread belief in the marabout system in Senegal and a strong commitment to it, it is not necessarily accompanied by an absolute attachment to any one living marabout.

=== Influence outside Senegal ===
The brotherhood has a sizable representation in certain large cities in Europe and the United States. Most of these cities with a large Senegalese immigrant population have a Keur Serigne Touba (Residence of the Master of Touba), a seat for the community which accommodates meetings and prayers while also being used as a provisional residence for newcomers. In Paris and New York City, a number of the Mouride followers are small-scale street merchants. They often send money back to the brotherhood leaders in Touba.

In 2004, Senegalese musician Youssou N'Dour released his Grammy Award winning album Egypt, which documents his Mouride beliefs and retells the story of Amadou Bamba and the Mouridiya. His intent was devotional, and the album was received that way in the West, but locally, some Mourides mistook "Egypt" for pop music using Islamic prayers, and initially expressed displeasure, which frustrated Youssou.
