= Amadou Bamba =

Senegalese Sufi leader (1853–1927)

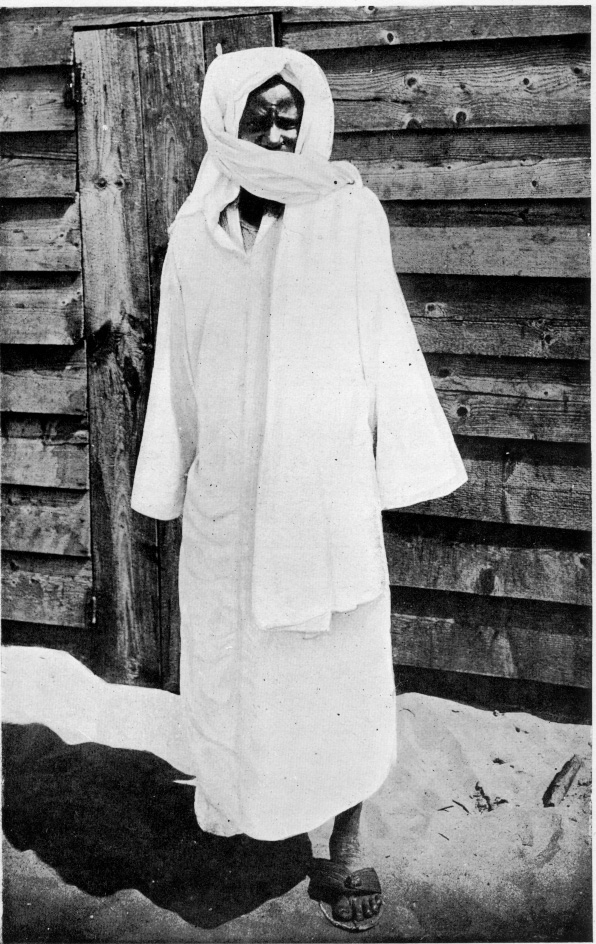
- Bamba, ca. 1913
- Born: 1853; Mbacké, Kingdom of Baol (modern Senegal)
- Died: 1927 (aged 73–74); Touba, French Senegal, French West Africa (in modern Diourbel Region, Senegal)
- Resting place: Touba
- Title: Sufi saint (Wali)
- Parent: Mame Diarra Bousso

Amadou Bamba (1853–1927), also known to followers as the Servant of the Messenger (Arabic: خادِم الرسول, romanized: Khādim al-Rasūl) and Serigne Touba or "Sheikh of Touba", was a Sufi saint and founder of the Mouride Brotherhood (the Muridiyya).

== Early life and background ==
Amadou Bamba was born on the outskirts of 1270 A.H. (around 1853 A.D.) in the village of Mbacké (Mbàkke Bawol in Wolof) in Baol. He was born into a family with an ancient Islamic tradition that had nevertheless maintained close relations and alliances with royal dynasties such as the Guééj. His father Maam Mor Anta Saly Mbacke was a Marabout from the Qadiriyya, the oldest tariqa (Sufi order) in Senegal. He had been appointed Qadi of the kingdom both by Maba Diakhou Ba and the Damel Lat Jor. It is said that even at a young age, He pressured his father to give up his important position as Qadi to the Damel. Amadou Bamba disavowed this collaboration, which he considered suspicious in that it obliged his father to render power-inspired rulings potentially contrary to Islamic law. He was the second son of Maam Mor Anta Saly Mbacke and Maam Mariyama Bousso (better known by the name Maam Diaara Bousso, or Diaratoullah in Arabic, which means "neighbor of God"). Both of his parents descended from the well-known patriarch Maam Mahram Mbacke, with their ancestors hailing from Fouta, northern Senegal.

== Foundation of Mouridiyya and Touba ==
The Mouride brotherhood began to develop at the end of the 19th century following the defeat of the Wolof monarchies. This period of deep socio-political crisis was conducive to the birth of religious organizations founded by strong personalities renowned for their science and holiness. Amadou Bamba founded the Mouride brotherhood in 1883, with its capital in Touba, Senegal. Today, Touba serves as the location of the sub-Saharan Africa's largest mosque, which was built by the Mourides.

His teachings emphasized the virtues of pacifism, hard work and good manners through what is commonly known as Jihādu nafs which emphasizes a personal struggle over "negative instincts." As an ascetic marabout who wrote tracts on meditation, rituals, work, and Quranic study, he is perhaps best known for his emphasis on work and industriousness.

Abdoul Ahad Mbacke, the third Caliph (Mouride leader) and son of Amadou Bamba, declared that his father had met the prophet Muhammad in his dreams, a tale that has become an article of faith for Mouride believers. During the month of Ramadan 1895, Muhammed and his companions appeared to him in a dream in Touba to confer upon him the rank of mujaddid of his age, and to test his faith. From this,he is said to also have been conferred the rank of "Servant of the Prophet."

He founded the city of Touba in 1887. In one of his numerous writings, Matlabul Fawzeyni (the quest for happiness in both worlds),he describes the purpose of the city, which was intended to reconcile the spiritual and the temporal.

== Facing colonial rule and exile ==
As Bamba's influence spread, the French colonial government worried about his growing power and potential to wage war against them. He had stirred "anti-colonial disobedience" and even converted a number of traditional kings and their followers and no doubt could have raised a huge military force, as Muslim leaders like Umar Tall and Samory Touré had before him. During this time, the French army and French colonial government were weary of Muslim leaders inciting revolts as they finished taking over Senegal.

The phobia of the colonial administration at the place of any Islamic movement made the judgements given to the Privy Council often constitute lawsuits of intention to religious leaders. Stopped in Diéwol, Cheikh Ahmadou Bamba was transferred to the office of the Governor of the colonial administration in Saint-Louis (Senegal). On Thursday September 5, 1895, he appeared before the Privy Council (Conseil d'Etat) of Saint-Louis to rule on his case. Ahmadou Bamba prayed two rakat in the Governor's office before addressing the council, declaring his firm intention to be subjected to God alone. With this symbolic prayer and stance in the sanctuary of the deniers of Islam, Bamba came to embody a new form of nonviolent resistance against the aims of colonial evangelists. Proof of Bamba having recited these prayers is not included in colonial archives, but is rather based on the testimonies of his disciples. As a result of Bamba's prayers, the Privy Council decided to deport him to "a place where its fanatic preachings would not have any effect". and exiled him to the equatorial forest of Gabon, where he remained for seven years and nine months. While in Gabon, he composed prayers and poems celebrating Allah.

From the beginning of the 19th century, the imperialist policy of France ended with the defeat of all the armed resistance movements in Senegal and the installation of a policy of Christianization and assimilation of the new colony to the cultural values of the metropolis. This led to a policy of exile or systematic elimination of the Muslim spiritual guides who openly spoke out against the colonial government. Thus, Ahmadou Bamba, whose only alleged crime was persisting in preaching Islam, was subjected to all manner of deprivation and trials for 32 years. Exiled for seven years to Gabon and five years to Mauritania and placed under house arrest in Diourbel, Senegal for fifteen years, Bamba nevertheless did not cease to defend the message of Islam until his death in 1927.

In the political sphere, Bamba led a pacifist struggle against French colonialism while trying to restore a purer practice of Islam insulated from French colonial influence. In a period when successful armed resistance was impossible, Cheikh Ahmadou Bamba led a spiritual struggle against colonial culture and politics. Although he did not wage outright war on them as several prominent Tijaan marabouts had done, he taught what he called the jihād al-'akbar or "greater struggle," which fought not through weapons but through learning and fear of God.

As Bamba gathered followers, he taught that salvation comes through complete submission to God and hard work. The Mouride order has built, following this teaching, a large economic organisation, involved in many aspects of the Senegalese economy. Groundnut cultivation, the primary cash crop of the colonial period, was an early example of this. Young followers were recruited to settle marginal lands in eastern Senegal, found communities and create groundnut plantations. With the organisation and supplies provided by the Brotherhood, a portion of the proceeds were returned to Touba, while the workers, after a period of years, earned ownership over the plantations and towns.

Fearing his influence, the French sentenced him to exile in Gabon (1895–1902) and later in Mauritania (1903–1907). However, these exiles inspired stories and folk tales of Bamba's miraculous survival of torture, deprivation, and attempted executions, and thousands more flocked to his organization.

By 1910, the French realized that Bamba was not interested in waging violent war against them, and was in fact quite cooperative, eventually releasing him to return to his expanded community. In 1918, they rewarded him with the French Legion of Honor for enlisting his followers in the First World War: he refused it. They allowed him to establish his community in Touba, believing in part that his doctrine of hard work could be made to work with French economic interests.

His movement continued to grow, and in 1926 he began work for the great mosque at Touba.

== Death ==
After his death in 1927, he was buried in Touba at a site he had chosen, adjacent to the future location of The Grand Mosque. He was succeeded by his descendants as hereditary leaders of the brotherhood with absolute authority over the followers. Currently, Serigne Mountakha Mbacké is the Khalifa-General, Ahmadou Bamba's oldest living grandson who holds the brotherhood's highest office.

== Legacy ==
Today, Bamba has an estimated following of more than 3 million people and parades occur around the world in his honor, including in various cities in the United States. One such city is New York, where Muslims of West African descent have organized an "annual Cheikh Ahmadou Bamba Day parade" for over twenty years. Celebrations like these create platforms to "redefine the boundaries of their African identities, cope with the stigma of blackness, and counteract an anti-Muslim backlash".

Every year, millions of Muslims from all over the world make a pilgrimage to Touba (known as the Magal), worshipping at the mosque and honoring the memory of Ahmadou Bamba.

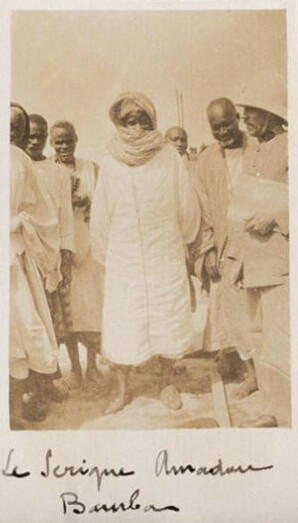
Bamba (1918)

Bamba has several surviving photographs, in which he wears a flowing white robe and his face is mostly covered by a scarf. These pictures are venerated and reproduced in paintings on walls, buses, taxis, etc. all over Senegal. The first surviving photo was originally taken in 1913 by "French colonial authorities".

Modern Mourides contribute earnings to the brotherhood, which provides social services, loans, and business opportunities in return.

Bamba is also known to have invented Café Touba. Bamba traditionally mixed coffee and spices together for medicinal purposes, and served it to his followers.

Senegalese musician Youssou N'Dour has claimed to be a follower of Mouridism. His 2004 Grammy-winning album Egypt features multiple songs that praise Bamba.

== Writings ==
Bamba was considered a prolific writer and poet. He is the author of various manuscripts, most of which are currently held at the library of the Great Mosque of Touba. Below is a selection of Bamba's writings:

- Jawharu-n-nafis (The Precious Jewel)
- Mawâhibul quddûs (the Gifts of the Holy Lord)
- Jadhbatu-ç-çighâr (the Attraction of the Youth)
- Mulayyinu-ç-çudûr (The Softening of the Hearts)
- Jaawartu Lâh (Allah's Neighborhood)
- Khâtimatu Munajât (The Ultimate Dialogue)
- Masâalik Al Jinân (The Itineraries to Paradise)
- Huqal Buka-u (Is it necessary to cry for the dead Sufi masters?)
- Munawwiru-ç-Cudûr (The Illumination of the Hearts)
- Maghâliqu-n-Nîrân wa Mafâtihul Jinân (The Locks of Hell and The Keys to Paradise)
- Tazawwudu-sh-Shubbân (Provisions of the Youth)

Poems honoring the Prophet Muhammad:

- Muqadimmatul Amdah (The Beginning of the Praises)
- Mawaahibu Naafi’u (The Gifts granted by the Beneficent Lord)
- Jasbul Quloob Ilâ Allâmil Ghuyûb (The Attraction of the Hearts Towards the Lord who Knows all the Hidden)

== Family and genealogy ==
The following list of ancestors, descendants, and companions of Sheikh Bamba has been adapted from Mbacke (2016).

Ancestors:

- Maam Mor Anta Saly Mbacke (father). His Teacher was Muhammad Sall, who hailed from Bamba village.
- Mame Diarra Bousso (Mama Diaara Bousso) (mother). Her family came from Golléré, a village near Fouta and Mbacké. Today, Mama Diaara is celebrated annually by hundreds of thousands of pilgrims at Porokhane, where she remains buried.
  - Maam Mor Anta Saly (Mama Diaara Bousso's father) was a highly respected Islamic scholar.
- Maam Balla Aicha (paternal grandfather). He was the youngest son of Maam Mahram.
- Maam Mahram Mbacke (paternal great-grandfather). He was both a well-known qadi and the founder of Mbacké.
  - El Hadji Malick Sy Tidiane (great-great-grandson of Maam Mahram Mbacke). El Hadji Malick Sy Tidiane's paternal grandmother was Maam Maty Mbacke (the daughter of Mame Thierno Farimata Mbacke, who was Maam Mahram Mbacke's son).

Descendants:

- Serigne Mouhamadou Moustapha Mbacké (first son). First caliph of the Mouride Brotherhood.
  - Serigne Cheikh Ahmadou Mbacke Gainde Fatma (grandson, and also the first caliph's eldest son). Gaindé Fatma founded French-language and Arabic-language schools, provided scholarships, and was an important community figure who focused on advancing education in Senegal.
- Sheikh Bachir Mouhamadoul (son) was Amadou Bamba's biographer.
- Sheikh Mouhamadou Lamine Bara Mbacke (1891-1936). Third son.
  - Serigne Sidi Moukhtar Mbacké (grandson). Seventh caliph of the Mouride Brotherhood. Son of Sheikh Mouhamadou Lamine Bara Mbacke.
- Sheikh Mouhamadoul Bachir (1895–1966). Fourth son.
  - Serigne Moustapha Mbacke Bassirou (grandson). Eldest son of Sheikh Mouhamadoul Bachir. He modernized Porokhane village, founded the Maam Diaara foundation, and set up a girls' boarding school in Porokhane that can accommodate 400 students.
- Serigne Mouhamadou Fallilou Mbacké (son). Second caliph of the Mouride Brotherhood.
- Serigne Abdou Ahad Mbacké (son). Third caliph of the Mouride Brotherhood.
- Serigne Abdou Khadr Mbacké (son). Fourth caliph of the Mouride Brotherhood.
- Serigne Saliou Mbacké (son). Fifth caliph of the Mouride Brotherhood, and the last surviving son of Bamba.
  - Serigne Mouhamadou Lamine Bara Mbacké. Sixth caliph of the Mouride Brotherhood, and the nephew of the fifth caliph Serigne Saliou Mbacké.

Siblings:

- Maam Mor Diarra, uterine brother. Today, he is revered by his city, Sahm.
- Maam Thierno Birahim Mbacke, younger brother. He took care of Bamba's family and community while he was exiled by French colonial authorities. Today, he is revered by his city, Darou Mousti.
- Maam Sheikh Anta Darou Salam, a Mouride businessman. Today, he is revered by his city, Darou Salam.
- Serigne Massamba. He copied Bamba's writings.
- Serigne Afe Mbacke

Other important people associated with Bamba:

- Sheikh Mouhamadou Lamine Diop Dagana, Bamba's biographer and companion
- Serigne Dame Abdourahmane Lo, teacher of Bamba's children
- Sheikh Adama Gueye, the first Mouride follower
- Maam Sheikh Ibrahima Fall, founder of the Baye Fall community

== See also ==
- Mouride
- Muslim brotherhoods of Senegal
- Touba, Senegal
- Great Mosque of Touba
- Qasida
