= Mbacké =

- City and commune
- Location within Senegal
- Coordinates: 14°47.5′N 15°54.5′W
- Country: Senegal
- Region: Diourbel
- Department: Mbacké

Government
  - Mayor: Abdou Mbacke Ndao

Area
  - City and commune: 18.37 km^{2} (7.09 sq mi)
- Elevation: 47 m (154 ft)

Population (2023 census)
  - City and commune: 101,451
  - Density: 5,523/km^{2} (14,300/sq mi)

Mbacké (Mbàkke in Wolof) is a city and urban commune in central Senegal, located 190 km (118 mi) east of Dakar. It is the capital of an administrative department in the Diourbel region. Along with the nearby city of Touba, Mbacké forms an urban conurbation whose population currently stands at 1,222,275, making it Senegal's second largest agglomeration. It is connected to Dakar and Touba by the N3 road.

== History ==
Mbacké, also known as Mbacké-Baol, was founded in the sparsely populated wilderness of Eastern Baol in 1796 by Mame Maram Muhammad al-Khayri (d. 1802), great-grandfather of Cheikh Ahmadou Bamba Mbacké. Mame Maram was a reputed Muslim jurisconsult. He received the land grant to establish Mbacké from the king of Baol, Amari Ngoné Ndella Fall, who was also king of neighboring Cayor.

During the first half of 19th century Mbacké was a well-known center of Islamic learning. It was destroyed by Maba Diakhou Ba, the Tijani jihadist from the Rip, in 1865 and the Mbacké family, including the young Ahmadou Bamba, was forced to join Maba's court in Nioro.

Cheikh Ahmadou Bamba returned to Mbacké in 1884 when he embarked upon his spiritual career. Due to the pressure of his growing following of disciples, Bamba soon moved away from the town, settling first in Darou Salam (now a suburb of Mbacké) and then in Touba, eight kilometers (5.0 miles) further to the north-east.

A spur of the Dakar-Niger railway was built to Mbacké in 1931, at which point the French colonial authorities laid out an "escale" neighborhood by the train station. A variety of businesses: wholesalers and traders, then opened shop. In 1952, Mbacké was raised to the rank of "commune" (equivalent to limited municipal status) and in 1958 it became the seat of an administrative subdivision (later called a "department"). Its population at that time was approximately 7000.

The phenomenal growth of near-by Touba began to impact developments in Mbacké in the 1970s. Many of its commercial establishments, including bank branches, relocated to the autonomous holy city of the Mourides, where taxation and real-estate are more favorable. However, as Mbacké lies beyond Touba's sacred precincts, it fulfills certain auxiliary functions, such as public administration and secular entertainment, forbidden in that holy city.
