= Muslim brotherhoods of Senegal =

This is a list of Sufi orders (Tariqas) in Senegal and the Gambia. They are active Muslim organizations that can also be found in many other parts of Africa and the Islamic world. Their members are mainly Wolofs, Fulas and Tocouleurs.

A majority of Senegalese Muslims belong to a Sufi brotherhood.

== Major orders ==
The four largest Sufi brotherhoods in Senegal are:

- The Xaadir (Qādiriyya), the oldest, founded in Baghdad by the Sufi mystic Abdul Qādir al-Jilānī in the 12th century, now pan-Islamic, spread to Senegal in the 18th century.
- The Tijaniyyah, the largest in membership, founded in Fez, Morocco by the Algerian born Cheikh Sīdī 'Aḥmad at-Tijānī. The order is centered in the city of Tivaouane.
- The Mourides, the richest and most active, founded by the Islamic leader Cheikh Amadou Bamba (1850–1927) of French West Africa, now Senegal. The order is centered in the city of Touba.
- The Layene are a smaller Sufi order, centered at Yoff north of Dakar.
