= Touba =

Ṭouba طوبى
- City
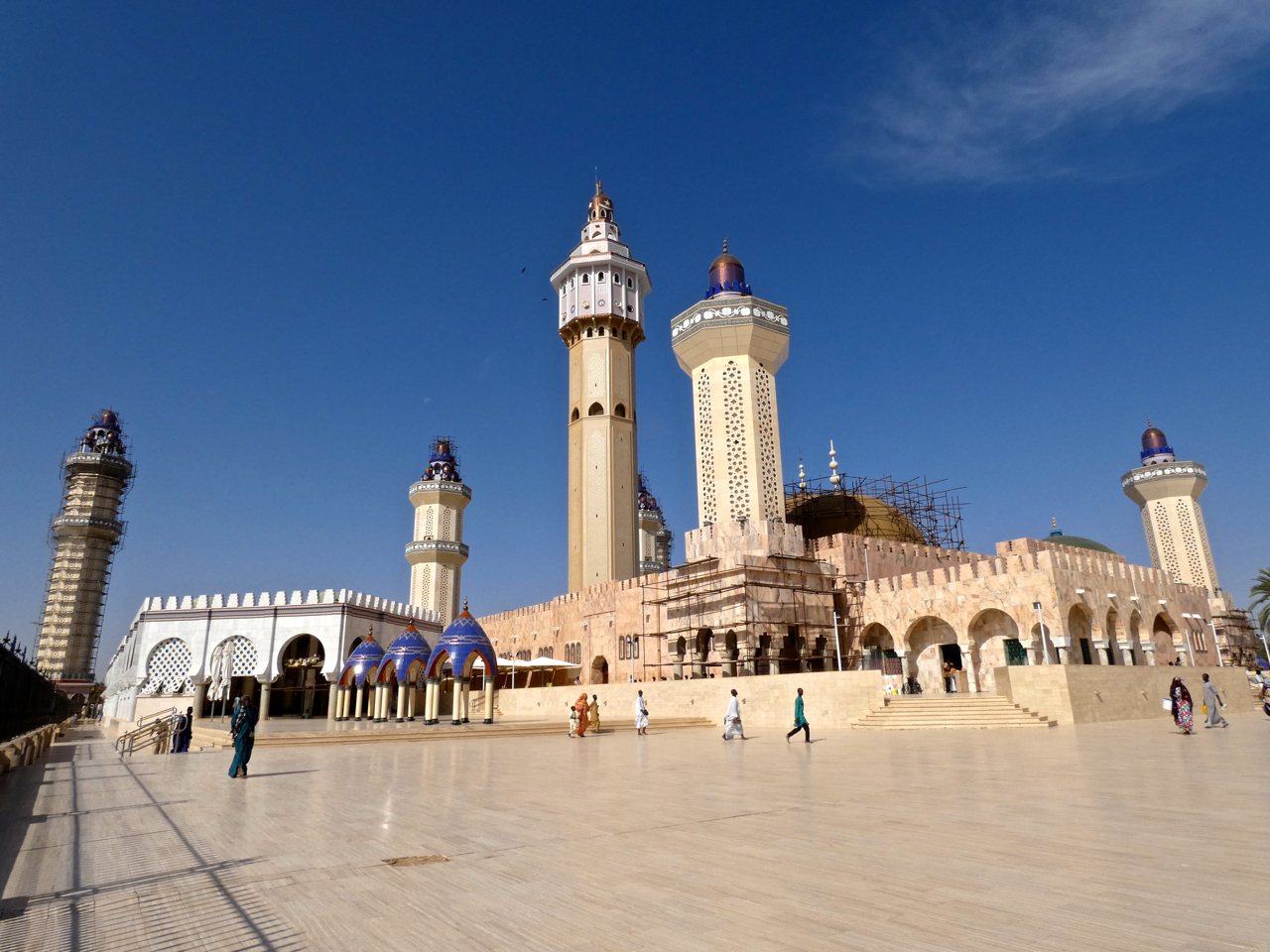
- The Great Mosque of Touba

- Location within Senegal
- Coordinates: 14°52′N 15°53′W
- Country: Senegal
- Region: Diourbel
- Department: Mbacké

Government
  - Governor: Mountakha Mbacké
- Elevation: 35 m (115 ft)

Population (2023 census)
  - Total: 1,120,824
- Time zone: UTC±0 (Greenwich Mean Time)

Ṭouba (Ḥassaniya Arabic: طوبى, 'Felicity'; Wolof: Tuubaa) is a city in central Senegal, part of Diourbel Region and Mbacké district. With a population of 1,120,824 in 2023, it is the second most populated Senegalese city after Dakar. It is the holy city of Mouridism and the burial place of its founder, Shaikh Ahmadou Bàmba Mbàcke. Next to his tomb stands a large mosque, completed in 1963.

== Etymology ==
The origin of the name is not certain and according to the Encyclopaedia of Islam, 'various etymologies have been current for the name', including Arabic tawba ('repentance'). The name is also superficially identical to the name of a tree in Paradise in Islamic tradition, Ṭūbā, and in Sufism, this symbolic tree represents an aspiration for spiritual perfection and closeness to God. But the Encyclopaedia concludes that the name of the place 'most likely stems from a reference to ṭūbā “blessing”'.

== History ==
The city began life as a simple hamlet of the 'Baol'. Shaikh Aamadu Bàmba Mbàkke, commonly known as "Cheikh Amadou Bamba" (1853-1927), is said to have led to the ascendance of the settlement to prominence when, in a moment of transcendence under a large tree there, he experienced a cosmic vision of light. In Arabic, ṭūbā means "felicity" or "bliss" and evokes the sweet pleasures of eternal life in the hereafter.

Aamadu Bàmba founded Touba in 1887. The holy site remained a tiny isolated place in the wilderness until his death and burial at the site of the Great Mosque, 40 years later. Along with the neighboring town of Mbacké (founded by Aamadu Bàmba's great-grandfather in 1796), the Mouride conurbation is Senegal's second largest urban area, after the capital region of Dakar.

== Legal status ==
Ṭūbā is a sacred area, and enjoys a quasi-extraterritoriality within the Republic of Senegal. It is under the sole control of a khalīfa-general, his helpers, and Bāy Fall (a militia of the Mouride order), rather than agents of the Senegalese state. As well as having religious consequences, this has made Touba a free-trade zone; in particular, imports from neighbouring Gambia are exempt there from state taxes. In the assessment of the Encyclopaedia of Islam,

under a very modern apparent exterior, one thus finds an ancient form of Senegalese, indeed, West African, Islamic life: the constituting of “maraboutic villages”, enclaves which bring together the most keen devotees and which, through the force of the charisma of their directors, are able to escape from the exactions, pressures and constraints of the warrior and temporal authorities.

During the Great Magal pilgrimage, official representatives of the Senegalese state make official delegations, recognising the distinctive status of Touba and the Mourides within Senegal.

== Geography ==
=== Overview ===
Located in central Senegal, Touba forms an urban agglomeration with the contiguous city of Mbacké.

=== Climate ===
Depending on the location of the weather station in Touba, the Köppen-Geiger climate classification system classifies the city's climate either as tropical wet and dry (Aw) or hot semi-arid (BSh).

Climate data for Touba, Senegal (21m)
Month	Jan	Feb	Mar	Apr	May	Jun	Jul	Aug	Sep	Oct	Nov	Dec	Year
Mean daily maximum °C (°F)	31.6 (88.9)	33 (91)	34 (93)	32.9 (91.2)	32.1 (89.8)	31.4 (88.5)	30.5 (86.9)	30 (86)	30.6 (87.1)	31.9 (89.4)	32.4 (90.3)	31.2 (88.2)	31.8 (89.2)
Daily mean °C (°F)	23.4 (74.1)	24.4 (75.9)	25.7 (78.3)	25.7 (78.3)	26.3 (79.3)	26.8 (80.2)	26.9 (80.4)	26.5 (79.7)	26.6 (79.9)	27.1 (80.8)	25.9 (78.6)	23.6 (74.5)	25.7 (78.3)
Mean daily minimum °C (°F)	15.3 (59.5)	15.9 (60.6)	17.5 (63.5)	18.6 (65.5)	20.5 (68.9)	22.3 (72.1)	23.4 (74.1)	23 (73)	22.7 (72.9)	22.3 (72.1)	19.5 (67.1)	16.1 (61.0)	19.8 (67.5)
Average precipitation mm (inches)	0 (0)	0 (0)	0 (0)	0 (0)	2 (0.1)	66 (2.6)	234 (9.2)	382 (15.0)	259 (10.2)	75 (3.0)	2 (0.1)	1 (0.0)	1,021 (40.2)
Source: Climate-Data.org

Climate data for Touba, Senegal (48m)
Month	Jan	Feb	Mar	Apr	May	Jun	Jul	Aug	Sep	Oct	Nov	Dec	Year
Mean daily maximum °C (°F)	32.5 (90.5)	34.2 (93.6)	36.3 (97.3)	37.5 (99.5)	38.1 (100.6)	36.7 (98.1)	33.7 (92.7)	32.3 (90.1)	32.5 (90.5)	34.9 (94.8)	35.4 (95.7)	32.3 (90.1)	34.7 (94.5)
Daily mean °C (°F)	23.4 (74.1)	24.5 (76.1)	26.6 (79.9)	27.8 (82.0)	28.9 (84.0)	29.4 (84.9)	28.2 (82.8)	27.3 (81.1)	27.2 (81.0)	27.8 (82.0)	26.6 (79.9)	23.6 (74.5)	26.8 (80.2)
Mean daily minimum °C (°F)	14.3 (57.7)	14.8 (58.6)	17 (63)	18.2 (64.8)	19.8 (67.6)	22.2 (72.0)	22.7 (72.9)	22.4 (72.3)	22 (72)	20.8 (69.4)	17.9 (64.2)	15 (59)	18.9 (66.1)
Average precipitation mm (inches)	1 (0.0)	0 (0)	0 (0)	0 (0)	1 (0.0)	30 (1.2)	105 (4.1)	176 (6.9)	139 (5.5)	35 (1.4)	1 (0.0)	1 (0.0)	489 (19.1)
Source: Climate-Data.org

== Mouridism ==
Touba is the holy city of Mouridism. Aamadu Bàmba Mbàkke, Senegal's most famous Sufi, was more than a spiritual master; he had a social mission as well, that of rescuing society from colonial alienation and returning it to the "Straight Path" of Islam. The city of Touba played a major role in both these endeavors.

Life in Touba is dominated by Muslim practice and Islamic scholarship. A major annual pilgrimage, called the Grand Magal of Touba, attracts around two million people from all over Senegal and beyond, principally Mourides, from as far away as Europe and America. Other, minor pilgrimages occur throughout the year.

For Mourides, Touba is a sacred place. Forbidden in the holy city are all illicit and frivolous pursuits, such as the consumption of alcohol and tobacco. The Mouride order controls its "capital" to the exclusion of usual state-run civil and administrative services. The city constitutes an administratively autonomous zone with special legal status within Senegal. Every aspect of its city's life and growth is managed by the order independently of the state, including education, health, supply of drinking water, public works, administration of markets, land tenure, and real estate development.

== Great Mosque ==
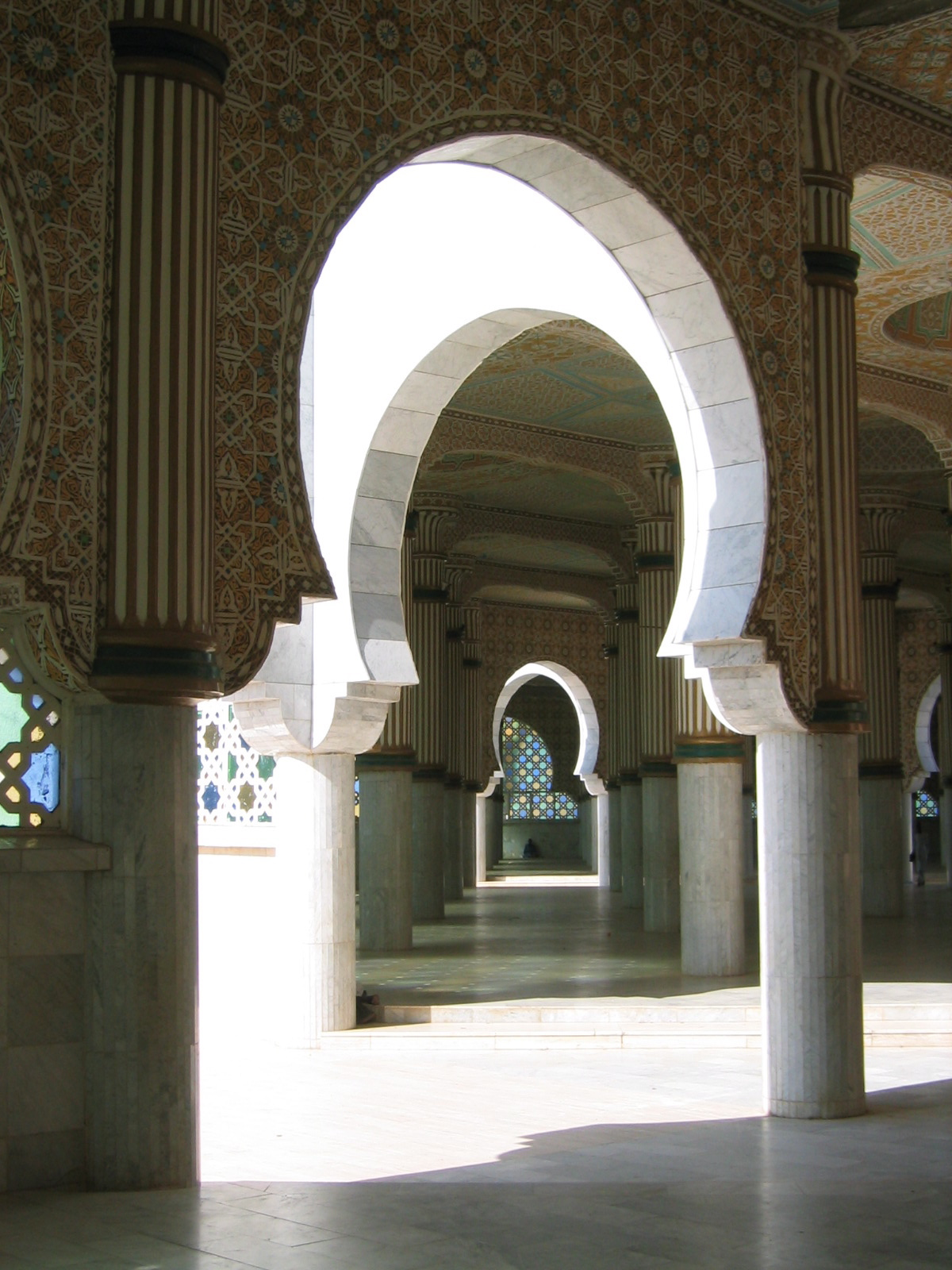
Interior of the Great Mosque of Touba

At the heart of the Mouride holy city lies its Great Mosque, purported to be one of the largest in Africa. Since its completion in 1963 it has been continuously enlarged and embellished. The mosque has five minarets and three large domes and is the place where Amadou Bamba, founder of the Mouride brotherhood, lies buried. The mosque's 87-meter (285 ft) high central minaret, called Lamp Fall, is one of Senegal's most famous monuments. The name Lamp Fall is a reference to Sheikh Ibrahima Fall, one of Bamba's most influential disciples. The mosque is frequently visited by tourists and worshippers alike.

The immediate vicinity of the mosque houses the mausolea of Aamadu Bàmba's sons, the caliphs of the Mouride order. Other important institutions in the center of the holy city include a library, the Caliph's official audience hall, a sacred "Well of Mercy", and a cemetery. Serigne Mountakha Mbacké is the current leader of the Mourides. He is the eighth Caliph of Mouridism and is the third caliph to not be a son of Ahmadu Bamba Mbacké. Like his predecessors, he resides in a large compound on the main square facing the Mosque.

== Notable people ==
- Amadou Bamba (1853-1927), Muslim Sufi religious leader

== See also ==
- Mouridism
- Islam in Senegal
- Muslim brotherhoods of Senegal
- Qasida
