= Deaths in January 2018 =

The following is a list of notable deaths in January 2018.

Entries for each day are listed alphabetically by surname. A typical entry lists information in the following sequence:

- Name, age, country of citizenship at birth, subsequent country of citizenship (if applicable), reason for notability, cause of death (if known), and reference.

== January 2018 ==
=== 1 ===
- Gert Brauer, 62, German footballer (Carl Zeiss Jena).
- František Brož, 88, Czech Olympic sprinter.
- Humberto Coutinho, 71, Brazilian physician and politician, President of the Legislative Assembly of Maranhão (since 2015), Mayor of Caxias (2005–2013), intestinal cancer.
- Peter Evans, 88, British musicologist.
- Philip Jacobson, 79, English journalist, meningitis.
- Milt Jamin, 78, American voice actor (Grand Theft Auto IV, The Big O, The Transformers).
- Jahn Otto Johansen, 83, Norwegian journalist.
- Miriam Kochan, 88, English writer and translator.
- Robert Mann, 97, American violinist and composer, founding member of the Juilliard String Quartet.
- Régis Manon, 52, Gabonese footballer (Tours FC, FC 105 Libreville, Joué-lès-Tours).
- Karel Matoušek, 89, Czech Olympic wrestler.
- Dušan Mitošević, 68, Serbian football player (Radnički Niš, Smederevo, Nîmes) and manager, cancer.
- Mick Murphy, 99, Irish hurler.
- Ebrahim Nafae, 83, Egyptian journalist, cancer.
- Manuel Olivencia, 88, Spanish economist and diplomat, complications from a fall.
- Llew Owens, 90, Australian rules footballer (Fitzroy, South Melbourne).
- Milton P. Rice, 97, American politician, Attorney General of Tennessee (1974).
- Herbert Schutz, 80, German-born Canadian philologist.
- Mauro Staccioli, 80, Italian sculptor, complications from pneumonia.
- Jon Paul Steuer, 33, American actor (Grace Under Fire, Little Giants, Star Trek: The Next Generation) and singer, suicide by gunshot.
- Tim Sweeney, 88, Irish hurler (Galway).
- Katsuhikari Toshio, 75, Japanese sumo wrestler, bile duct cancer.
- Wolfgang Treu, 87, German cinematographer.
- Edemariam Tsega, 79, Ethiopian physician.
- Betty Willis, 76, American soul singer, strangled.

=== 2 ===
- Dee Ayuba, 31, British-Nigerian basketball player, heart attack.
- Małgorzata Bocheńska, 69, Polish journalist.
- Frank Buxton, 87, American actor (What's Up, Tiger Lily?), screenwriter and director (The Odd Couple, Happy Days).
- Tony Calder, 74, English music promoter and executive (The Beatles, The Rolling Stones), complications from pneumonia.
- Donna Carter, 73, Trinidadian politician, Senator, High Commissioner to South Africa.
- Bryan Conquest, 87, Australian politician.
- Alan Deakin, 76, English footballer (Aston Villa, Walsall, Tamworth).
- Giovanni Di Clemente, 69, Italian film producer.
- Marian Donat, 57, Polish Olympic judoka.
- Thomas Ellis, 97, American pilot (Tuskegee Airmen).
- Ronald R. Fieve, 87, American psychiatrist.
- Eugène Gerards, 77, Dutch football player and manager (SV Limburgia, Fortuna Sittard, OFI).
- Rick Hall, 85, American record producer, songwriter and recording studio owner (FAME Studios), prostate cancer.
- Ferdinando Imposimato, 81, Italian judge.
- Durahim Jamaluddin, 36, Malaysian footballer, heart attack.
- Ali Kadhim, 69, Iraqi Olympic footballer (1980).
- Lawal Kaita, 85, Nigerian politician, Governor of Kaduna State (1983).
- Jyrgalbek Kalmamatov, 45, Kyrgyz politician, MP (since 2015), heart attack.
- Rosa Kavara, 59, Namibian politician.
- Guida Maria, 67, Portuguese actress, pancreatic cancer.
- Mike McCartney, 63, Scottish footballer (Carlisle United, Plymouth Argyle, Southampton).
- Ali Akbar Moinfar, 89, Iranian politician, MP (1980–1984), Minister of Petroleum (1979–1980).
- Thomas S. Monson, 90, American religious leader and writer, President of The Church of Jesus Christ of Latter-day Saints (since 2008) and Quorum of the Twelve Apostles (1995–2008).
- Armando Monteiro Filho, 92, Brazilian politician, Minister of Agriculture (1961–1962).
- Mountain Fiji, 60, American professional wrestler (GLOW).
- Michael Pfeiffer, 92, German football player (national team) and manager (Roda JC Kerkrade, Alemannia Aachen).
- Wilbur Plaugher, 95, American cowboy, rodeo clown and dog trainer.
- Felix Reilly, 84, Scottish footballer (Dunfermline Athletic, East Fife).
- Sauryavong Savang, 80, Laotian prince.
- Željko Senečić, 84, Croatian film and television production designer.
- Radha Viswanathan, 83, Indian vocalist, pneumonia.
- Lyndon Wainwright, 98, British metrologist, ballroom dancer and author.
- Jim Wiste, 70, Canadian ice hockey player (Chicago Blackhawks, Vancouver Canucks).
- Betty Woodman, 87, American ceramic artist and sculptor, pneumonia.
- Ye Zhemin, 93, Chinese art historian.
- Yell Htwe Aung, 24, Burmese comedian and actor, injuries sustained in an assault.

=== 3 ===
- Mlungisi Bali, 27, South African rugby union player (Griffons, Border Bulldogs), stabbed.
- Donal Barrington, 89, Irish judge, member of the Supreme Court (1996–2000).
- Luigi Alberto Bianchi, 73, Italian violinist.
- Bill Blunden, 83, British film editor.
- Colin Brumby, 84, Australian composer and conductor.
- Valery Chalidze, 79, Russian-born American publisher.
- Darci, 49, Brazilian footballer (Volta Redonda Futebol Clube, Widzew Łódź, Antalyaspor), heart attack.
- Philip Eden, 66, British meteorologist, broadcaster and author.
- Dolly Everett, 14, Australian cyberbullying victim, suicide.
- Stanley Hartt, 80, Canadian civil servant, Chief of Staff to the Prime Minister (1989–1990), cancer.
- Heriberto Hermes, 84, American Roman Catholic prelate, Bishop of Cristalândia (1990–2009).
- Keorapetse Kgositsile, 79, South African poet and journalist.
- Lara Kruger, 30, South African radio personality and transgender rights activist.
- Aurelio Menéndez, 90, Spanish politician and lawyer, Minister of Education (1976–1977).
- Francis George Adeodatus Micallef, 89, Maltese Roman Catholic prelate, Apostolic Vicar of Kuwait (1981–2005).
- Miroslav Miletić, 92, Croatian composer.
- Rob Picciolo, 64, American baseball player (Oakland Athletics, Milwaukee Brewers) and coach (San Diego Padres), heart attack.
- Konrad Ragossnig, 85, Austrian classical guitarist.
- Alan Sagner, 97, American public servant and political fundraiser, chairman of Port Authority of New York and New Jersey and the CPB, cardiac amyloidosis.
- Medeniyet Shahberdiyeva, 87, Turkmen opera singer and music educator.
- Ambalavaner Sivanandan, 94, Sri Lankan author.
- Serafino Sprovieri, 87, Italian Roman Catholic prelate, Archbishop of Rossano-Cariati (1980–1991) and Benevento (1991–2006).
- Igor Strelbin, 43, Russian footballer (Dynamo Bryansk, FC Dynamo Makhachkala, Zenit Penza).
- Jeremy Taylor, 74, American dream worker.
- Eugene V. Thaw, 90, American art dealer and collector.

=== 4 ===
- Aharon Appelfeld, 85, Romanian-born Israeli writer.
- Ulhas Bapat, 67, Indian santoor player.
- Dick Bestwick, 87, American football coach (Virginia Cavaliers), transverse myelitis.
- Nicola Gordon Bowe, 69, British art historian.
- Johannes Brost, 71, Swedish actor (Rederiet, Black Jack, Stjärnhuset), throat cancer.
- Brendan Byrne, 93, American politician, Governor of New Jersey (1974–1982), lung infection.
- Papa Camara, 66, Guinean football player (Hafia) and coach (national team).
- Gerard Conley Sr., 88, American politician, member of the Maine Senate (1968–1984) and House of Representatives (1964–1968), Mayor of Portland (1970–1971).
- Joaquín Cortizo, 85, Spanish footballer.
- Carmen Cozza, 87, American baseball and football player (Miami Redhawks) and Hall of Fame coach (Yale Bulldogs).
- Bruce Halle, 87, American auto parts executive and philanthropist, founder of Discount Tire.
- Owen Hardy, 95, New Zealand WWII air force pilot.
- Lyli Herse, 89, French racing cyclist.
- Senichi Hoshino, 70, Japanese Hall of Fame baseball player (Chunichi Dragons) and manager (Hanshin Tigers, Tohoku Rakuten Golden Eagles), pancreatic cancer.
- Philipp Jenninger, 85, German politician, President of the Bundestag (1984–1988).
- Rafiatou Karimou, 71, Beninese politician and teacher, member of the National Assembly (1999–2006).
- Harold R. Kaufman, 91, American physicist.
- Gail McIntosh, 62, New Zealand politician, MP for Lyttelton (1990–1993).
- Jack N. Merritt, 87, American army general.
- Emerante Morse, 99, Haitian dancer and folklorist.
- Robert Norris, 93, British Olympic basketball player.
- Ray Robinson, 88, South African Olympic cyclist.
- Zubaida Tariq, 72, Pakistani chef, complications from a heart attack.
- Ray Thomas, 76, English singer-songwriter ("Veteran Cosmic Rocker", "For My Lady") and Hall of Fame musician (The Moody Blues), prostate cancer.
- Geoffrey Vaughan, 84, Australian rugby union player and pharmaceutical scientist.
- Vladimir Yankilevsky, 79, Russian artist.

=== 5 ===
- Antonio Valentín Angelillo, 80, Italian-Argentine football player (Inter Milan, A.S. Roma, Boca Juniors).
- Herb Appenzeller, 92, American football coach.
- Muntazir Baba, 68, Pakistani poet.
- Emanuel Barbara, 68, Maltese Roman Catholic prelate, Bishop of Malindi (since 2011).
- Thomas Bopp, 68, American astronomer, co-discoverer of Comet Hale–Bopp, liver failure.
- Aydın Boysan, 96, Turkish architect, multiple organ failure.
- Rasa Chughtai, 89, Indian-born Pakistani poet.
- Carlos Heitor Cony, 91, Brazilian journalist and writer, multiple organ failure.
- Robert Q. Crane, 91, American politician, Treasurer and Receiver-General of Massachusetts (1965–1991); member of the Massachusetts House of Representatives (1957–1964).
- Donald D. Evans, 90, Canadian philosopher.
- Jacques Genest, 98, Canadian physician and scientist.
- Carole Hart, 74, American television writer (Sesame Street), cancer.
- Juanita Helphrey, 76, American Hidatsa community leader.
- Bruce Hood, 81, Canadian hockey referee (NHL), prostate cancer.
- Henry Jean-Baptiste, 85, French politician, Deputy (1986–2002).
- Hans Werner Kettenbach, 89, German journalist and author.
- Asghar Khan, 96, Pakistani politician and military officer, Commander-in-Chief of the Air Force (1957–1965).
- Marián Labuda, 73, Slovak actor.
- Norman Lamb, 82, American politician, member of the Oklahoma Senate (1971–1988).
- John McIntyre, 89, American Olympian
- Mick Murphy, 77, Irish hurler (Tipperary).
- Dhiraj Kumar Nath, 72, Bangladeshi diplomat, member of the Caretaker government panel.
- Livingstone Mpalanyi Nkoyoyo, 80, Ugandan Anglican prelate, Archbishop of Uganda (1995–2004).
- Vincent Mojwok Nyiker, 84, Sudanese Roman Catholic prelate, Bishop of Malakal (1979–2009).
- Münir Özkul, 92, Turkish actor.
- Carlo Pedretti, 89, Italian historian (Leonardo da Vinci).
- Sardar Ahmed Ali Khan Pitafi, 74, Pakistani politician, member of the Provincial Assembly of Sindh (2014–2017), cancer.
- Marina Ripa di Meana, 76, Italian writer, stylist and TV personality, cancer.
- István Sándor, 96, Hungarian Olympic rower.
- Vassilios Sillis, 88, Greek Olympic athlete (1952, 1960).
- Barry Thomas, 80, New Zealand rugby union player (Auckland, Wellington, national team).
- Jerry Van Dyke, 86, American actor and comedian (My Mother the Car, The Dick Van Dyke Show, Coach), heart failure.
- John Whitney Walter, 83, American historian and politician.
- Peter Wells, 88, British-born New Zealand Olympic athlete (1952, 1956).
- Gihan Wikramanayake, 57, Sri Lankan academic.
- John Young, 87, American astronaut (Apollo 16, STS-1), pneumonia.

=== 6 ===
- Horace Ashenfelter, 94, American athlete, Olympic champion (1952).
- Remídio José Bohn, 67, Brazilian Roman Catholic prelate, Bishop of Cachoeira do Sul (since 2011).
- Elza Brandeisz, 110, Hungarian dancer and teacher, conferred Righteous Among the Nations.
- Max Collie, 86, Australian trombonist.
- Rita Crocker Clements, 86, American political organizer, First Lady of Texas (1979–1983, 1987–1991), complications from Alzheimer's disease.
- Walther Dürr, 85, German musicologist.
- Raymond Gervais, 71, Canadian artist.
- Marjorie Holt, 97, American politician, member of the US House of Representatives for Maryland's 4th District (1973–1987).
- Rod Hunter, 74, Canadian curler, world champion (1970, 1971).
- Bob Jenson, 86, American politician, member of the Oregon House of Representatives (1997–2015).
- Elizabeth Meehan, 70, Scottish political scientist.
- Kapil Mohan, 88, Indian beverage and food executive (Old Monk, Mohan Meakin), cardiac arrest.
- Wayne Norton, 75, Canadian baseball player and coach, complications from amyotrophic lateral sclerosis.
- William R. Ojala, 92, American politician, member of the Minnesota House of Representatives (1971–1974).
- Peter Preston, 79, British journalist, editor of The Guardian (1975–1995), melanoma.
- Baldev Raj, 70, Indian nuclear physicist.
- Jimmy Robinson, 67, American recording engineer (Led Zeppelin).
- Nigel Sims, 86, English footballer (Aston Villa, Wolverhampton, Peterborough).
- Greta Thyssen, 90, Danish-born American actress (Quiz Whizz, Pies and Guys, Sappy Bull Fighters), pneumonia.
- Dave Toschi, 86, American police detective (Zodiac Killer), pneumonia.
- Frank Varrichione, 85, American football player (Pittsburgh Steelers, Los Angeles Rams).

=== 7 ===
- Meshary Al-Arada, 35, Kuwaiti singer and composer, traffic collision.
- Jim Anderton, 79, New Zealand politician, Deputy Prime Minister (1999–2002), MP (1984–2011) and Leader of the Progressive Party (2002–2012).
- Ed Bennett, 80, American Olympic sailor.
- Will Gay Bottje, 92, American composer.
- Joe Ellis Brown, 84, American politician, member of the South Carolina House of Representatives (1986–2006).
- Marley Caribu, 70, Japanese manga writer (Old Boy).
- Shiv Chopra, 84, Canadian microbiologist and human rights activist.
- Bryn Crossley, 59, Welsh jockey, seizure.
- Robert Diggelmann, 93, Swiss Olympic wrestler (1948).
- Tom Dowling, 77, American football coach (Georgetown Tigers, Liberty Flames), pancreatic cancer.
- Noël Estcourt, 89, Rhodesian-born English rugby union player.
- France Gall, 70, French singer ("Laisse tomber les filles", "Poupée de cire, poupée de son", "Ella, elle l'a"), Eurovision winner (1965), cancer.
- Anna Mae Hays, 97, American military officer and nurse, Chief of Army Nurse Corps (1967–1971), first female U.S. General, complications from a heart attack.
- Markku Into, 72, Finnish poet.
- Tom Netherton, 70, American singer, pneumonia.
- Nico, 56, Swiss western lowland gorilla.
- Gustav Heiberg Simonsen, 82, Norwegian lawyer and politician.
- Buster Stiggs, 63, British-born New Zealand drummer (Suburban Reptiles, The Swingers, Models), complications from kidney disease and multiple myeloma.
- Antoni Subirà, 77, Spanish politician, member of Parliament of Catalonia (1980–1993) and co-founder of Democratic Convergence of Catalonia.
- Peter Sutherland, 71, Irish barrister and banker, Attorney General (1981–1982, 1982–1984), founding Director-General of the World Trade Organization (1993–1995).
- Chris Tsangarides, 61, British music producer (Black Sabbath, Judas Priest, Thin Lizzy), pneumonia and heart failure.
- Bjørg Vik, 82, Norwegian writer, co-founder of Sirene.
- Shrivallabh Vyas, 60, Indian actor (Lagaan).
- Saksham Yadav, 28, Indian powerlifter, traffic collision.
- Dick Young, 90, American baseball player (Philadelphia Phillies).
- Doug Young, 98, American voice actor (Quick Draw McGraw, The Flintstones, Jonny Quest).

=== 8 ===
- Hans Aabech, 69, Danish footballer (Skovshoved IF, national team).
- Robert Barry, 85, American jazz musician.
- Agustín Bernal, 59, Mexican actor.
- Michael Hare, 2nd Viscount Blakenham, 79, British hereditary peer, company chairman (Pearson PLC), and environmentalist.
- Salvador Borrego, 102, Mexican journalist and conspiracy theorist.
- Bruce Cole, 79, American humanist, Chairman of the NEH (2001–2009), Presidential Citizens Medal recipient (2008).
- Gerald Degaetano, 53, Maltese athlete.
- Yvonne Englich, 38, German wrestler, cancer.
- Juan Carlos García, 29, Honduran footballer (Marathón, Olimpia, national team), leukemia.
- J. F. C. Harrison, 96, British historian and author.
- Paddy Harte, 86, Irish politician, TD (1961–1997).
- René Jeandel, 93, French Olympic skier.
- Claude Jean-Prost, 81, French Olympic ski jumper.
- Jenny Joseph, 85, English poet.
- Ruth Kaarlela, 98, American gerontologist and social worker.
- Frank Kreith, 95, Austrian-born American mechanical engineer.
- Denise LaSalle, 78, American blues singer ("Trapped by a Thing Called Love").
- Vojtěch Lindaur, 60, Czech journalist, radio host (Radio Beat) and record producer.
- George Lindbeck, 94, American Lutheran theologian.
- James Makumbi, 75, Ugandan physician, politician and kidnap victim, MP and Minister of Health.
- Bonnie Mathieson, 72, American biomedical scientist, heart attack.
- Keith McKenzie, 95, Australian VFL football player and coach (North Melbourne, Carlton Football Club).
- Kynaston McShine, 82, American curator (MoMA).
- Kapil Mohan, 88, Indian entrepreneur.
- James N. Morgan, 99, American economist.
- Antonio Munguía, 75, Mexican footballer (Club Necaxa, Cruz Azul, national team).
- Chuck Murphy, 70, American prelate, bishop of the Anglican Mission in the Americas, brain cancer.
- Jackie Perry, 93, English rugby league footballer (Wakefield Trinity).
- Donnelly Rhodes, 80, Canadian actor (Soap, Battlestar Galactica, Da Vinci's Inquest), cancer.
- George Maxwell Richards, 86, Trinidadian politician, President (2003–2013), heart failure.
- Myron Rush, 96, American Kremlinologist, Cornell University professor, and CIA analyst, kidney failure.
- Wojciech Rydz, 85, Polish Olympic fencer (1952).
- David Sherwin, 75, British screenwriter (if...., O Lucky Man!, Britannia Hospital), sepsis.
- Jim Sypult, 72, American football coach.
- Ron Tandberg, 74, Australian cartoonist, oesophageal cancer.
- Charles H. Turner, 82, American attorney.
- Tricia Walker, 53, British author, breast cancer.

=== 9 ===
- Bob Bailey, 75, American baseball player (Montreal Expos, Pittsburgh Pirates, Los Angeles Dodgers).
- Stan Bronson Jr., 89, American baseball batboy.
- Neave Brown, 88, American-born British architect, lung cancer.
- Theodore V. Buttrey Jr., 88, American numismatist.
- Maruja Callaved, 97, Spanish television director.
- Dreaming of Anna, 14, American racehorse, ruptured aorta.
- Wayne Ellis, 49, Welsh boxer.
- Guan De, 85, Chinese aeroelasticity engineer and aircraft designer.
- Brandon Hixon, 36, American politician, member of the Idaho House of Representatives (2012–2017), suicide by gunshot.
- Nicky Hoffmann, 77, Luxembourgish footballer.
- Heikki Kirkinen, 90, Finnish historian.
- Agnes D. Lattimer, 89, American pediatrician, cancer.
- Terence Marsh, 86, British production designer (Doctor Zhivago, Oliver!, The Shawshank Redemption), Oscar winner (1966, 1969), cancer.
- Valeri Matyunin, 57, Russian footballer (Dynamo Moscow, Dnepr Mogilev, Fakel Voronezh).
- Jean-Marc Mazzonetto, 34, French rugby union player (Stade Montois), traffic collision.
- Serigne Sidi Moukhtar Mbacké, 93, Senegalese religious chief, Caliph of Mouride (since 2010).
- Vladimír Miko, 74, Slovak table tennis player.
- Joseph Wayne Miller, 36, American actor (Heavyweights).
- Robert Minlos, 86, Russian mathematician.
- Gerald Morkel, 76, South African politician, Premier of the Western Cape (1998–2001), Mayor of Cape Town (2001–2002).
- Odvar Nordli, 90, Norwegian politician, Prime Minister (1976–1981), prostate cancer.
- Yılmaz Onay, 80, Turkish author.
- Kato Ottio, 23, Papua New Guinean rugby league footballer (national team), complications from heat stroke.
- Mario Perniola, 76, Italian philosopher.
- Ted Phillips, 84, English footballer (Ipswich Town, Leyton Orient, Colchester United), dementia.
- Victoriano Ríos Pérez, 87, Spanish politician, member (1987–1999, 2003–2004) and president (1987–1995) of the Parliament of the Canary Islands, Senator (1995–2003).
- Milton J. Rosenberg, 92, American psychology professor (University of Chicago) and radio host (WGN), pneumonia.
- Reza Sheikholeslami, 76, Iranian academic.
- Archie Styles, 78, English footballer (Wrexham, Stourbridge).
- Kurt Thalmann, 86, Swiss footballer (FC Basel).
- Alexander Vedernikov, 90, Russian singer and teacher, Bolshoi Theatre soloist (1958–1990), People's Artist of the USSR (1976).
- Yuan Chengye, 93, Chinese organic chemist.

=== 10 ===
- John Hurst Adams, 90, American civil rights activist.
- Rocky Agusta, 67, Italian race car driver.
- Damdinjavyn Bandi, 75, Mongolian Olympic boxer (1972, 1976).
- Victor Brooke, 3rd Viscount Alanbrooke, 85, British peer.
- Étienne Bally, 94, French Olympic sprinter (1948, 1952), European champion (1950).
- Buckskin Bill Black, 88, American television personality.
- Eddie Clarke, 67, British guitarist (Motörhead, Fastway), pneumonia.
- Charles Davis, 90, American Olympic sports shooter (1972).
- Mikhail Derzhavin, 81, Russian actor.
- Urs Fankhauser, 74, Swiss Olympic rower (1968, 1972).
- Sir Angus Farquharson, 82, British public servant, Lord Lieutenant of Aberdeenshire (1998–2010).
- David Fisher, 88, British television writer (Doctor Who, Dixon of Dock Green, Hammer House of Horror).
- Pierre Grillet, 85, French footballer (RC Paris).
- Pekka Halme, 90, Finnish Olympic high jumper.
- Gordon Hølmebakk, 89, Norwegian publishing editor.
- John Sherrill Houser, 82, American artist, heart failure.
- William B. Keene, 92, American judge (Los Angeles County Superior Court) and television personality (Divorce Court).
- Katherine Kellgren, 48, American narrator and actress, cancer.
- Tommy Lawrence, 77, Scottish footballer (Liverpool, Tranmere Rovers, national team).
- Tom Luken, 92, American politician, member of the U.S. House of Representatives for Ohio's 1st and 2nd Districts (1974–1975, 1977–1991), Mayor of Cincinnati (1971–1972).
- Philippe Marchand, 78, French politician, Deputy (1978–1991), Minister of the Interior (1991–1992).
- John McGlashan, 50, Scottish footballer (Millwall, Peterborough, Rotherham).
- Novello Novelli, 87, Italian actor (The Pool Hustlers, Dear Goddamned Friends).
- June Rose, 91, British biographer.
- Doreen Tracey, 74, English-born American actress (The Mickey Mouse Club), cancer and pneumonia.
- Celestine Ujang Jilan, 70, Malaysian politician, Speaker of the Sarawak State Legislative Assembly (1981–1987).
- Gordon Wills, 83, English footballer (Notts County, Leicester City).

=== 11 ===
- Doug Barnard Jr., 95, American politician, member of the U.S. House of Representatives from Georgia's 10th district (1977–1993).
- Gene Cole, 89, American athlete, Olympic silver medalist (1952).
- Kevin Dahlgren, 25, American convicted serial killer, suicide by hanging.
- Raúl García, 55, Salvadoran footballer (Águila), lymphoma.
- Stephane Gauger, 48, Vietnamese-born American film director and screenwriter (Owl and the Sparrow, Powder Blue), stroke.
- Geoffrey C. Hazard Jr., 88, American lawyer.
- John W. Hennessey Jr., 92, American academic.
- Ednyfed Hudson Davies, 88, Welsh politician, MP for Conway (1966–1970) and Caerphilly (1979–1983).
- Jeremy Inkel, 34, Canadian electronic music programmer and keyboardist, complications from asthma.
- Sumiko Iwao, 83, Japanese psychologist, editor-in-chief of Japan Echo (1997–2007).
- Edgar Ray Killen, 92, American Ku Klux Klan leader and convicted murderer.
- Noemi Lapzeson, 77, Argentinian dancer and choreographer.
- Takis Loukanidis, 80, Greek footballer (Doxa Drama, Panathinaikos, national team).
- Jan Valentin Sæther, 73, Norwegian painter and priest.
- Giuseppe Secchi, 86, Italian footballer (Triestina, Udinese Calcio, A.C. Fanfulla 1874).
- Bernice I. Sumlin, 91, American educator.
- Noel Thornton, 74, Australian rugby league player (Western Suburbs Magpies, Cronulla-Sutherland Sharks).
- Garth Turcott, 87, Canadian politician.
- Julie Van Zandt, 88, American actress (77 Sunset Strip).

=== 12 ===
- Rudy Árias, 86, Cuban baseball player (Chicago White Sox).
- Peter Batkin, 65, English auctioneer, stroke.
- Eddy Beugels, 73, Dutch cyclist.
- Lisa Chedekel, 57, American journalist, cancer.
- Suzie Dickinson, 62, Australian musician, brain cancer.
- Bella Emberg, 80, British actress (The Russ Abbot Show, The Benny Hill Show, Bear Behaving Badly).
- Frankie Muse Freeman, 101, American civil rights attorney.
- Robert W. Hamilton, 86, American legal scholar.
- Keith Jackson, 89, American sportscaster (ABC Sports, Wide World of Sports).
- Jean-Louis Koszul, 97, French mathematician.
- Jim McNally, 86, American Olympic sports shooter.
- Ilkka Pastinen, 89, Finnish diplomat.
- Richard Peterson, 77, New Zealand fencer.
- Pierre Pincemaille, 61, French organist, lung cancer.
- George Pitcher, 92, American philosopher.
- Léon Ritzen, 78, Belgian footballer (R.W.D. Molenbeek, Beerschot, national team).
- Doodhnath Singh, 81, Indian writer, prostate cancer.
- Sir Keith Speed, 83, British politician, MP (1968–1974, 1974–1997), Navy Minister (1979–1981).
- John V. Tunney, 83, American politician, member of the U.S. House of Representatives from California's 38th district (1965–1971) and U.S. Senator (1971–1977), prostate cancer.
- Heinrich von Stietencron, 84, German indologist.

=== 13 ===
- Shaukat Abbas, 71, Pakistani cricketer.
- Dean Allen, 51, Canadian typographer and web developer.
- Bob Beak, 92, British Anglican prelate, Assistant Bishop of Marsabit (1984–1989).
- Greg Critser, 63, American writer, glioblastoma.
- Kaj Czarnecki, 81, Finnish Olympic fencer (1960).
- Hélder d'Oliveira, 83, Portuguese Olympic sailor.
- John Elder, 85, Australian football player.
- Otoniel Gonzaga, 75, Filipino opera singer.
- Doug Harvey, 87, American Hall of Fame baseball umpire.
- Mohammed Hazzaz, 72, Moroccan footballer (MAS Fez).
- Darmanto Jatman, 75, Indonesian poet.
- Emmett Johns, 89, Canadian Roman Catholic priest.
- Rick Jolly, 71, British Royal Navy surgeon.
- Byron Langley, 91, American politician.
- Reg MacDonald, 83, Canadian politician.
- Doug Mooney, 88, American college football and tennis coach.
- Jack Nel, 89, South African cricketer.
- Tzimis Panousis, 63, Greek singer, comedian and actor, heart attack.
- Jean Porter, 95, American actress (Abbott and Costello in Hollywood, Bathing Beauty, Cry Danger).
- Julio Rocha López, 67, Nicaraguan football administrator, President of the Nicaraguan Football Federation (1987–2012) and UNCAF (2003–2017).
- Aristeidis Roubanis, 85, Greek Olympic basketball player and javelin thrower (1952).
- Ernest H. Sanders, 99, German-born American music historian.
- Tad Schnugg, 73, American theater director.
- Walter Schuster, 88, Austrian alpine skier, Olympic bronze medalist (1956).
- Emily Anne Staples, 88, American politician, member of the Minnesota Senate (1977–1981).
- Naomi Stevens, 92, American actress (Vega$, The Apartment, Valley of the Dolls).
- Eliyahu Winograd, 91, Israeli judge.

=== 14 ===
- Geoffrey Best, 89, English historian.
- Barbara Cope, 67, American rock 'n' roll groupie, house fire.
- Sir John Cullen, 91, British chemical engineer.
- Paul Lustig Dunkel, 74, American flutist and conductor.
- Pablo García Baena, 96, Spanish poet.
- Dan Gurney, 86, American Hall of Fame racing driver (All American Racers), race car constructor (Eagle Mk1), and team owner (Eagle), pneumonia.
- George Haines, 96, American basketball player.
- Cecil Hoekstra, 82, Canadian ice hockey player (Montreal Canadiens).
- Stan Hovdebo, 92, Canadian politician.
- Bill Hughes, 87, American jazz trombonist.
- Satnam Singh Kainth, 56, Indian politician, brain hemorrhage.
- Max Labovitch, 93, Canadian ice hockey player (New York Rangers).
- Erling Mandelmann, 82, Danish photographer.
- Spanky Manikan, 75, Filipino actor, lung cancer.
- Mario Martinez, 60, American weightlifter, Olympic silver medalist (1984).
- François Morel, 91, Canadian composer.
- Yosuke Natsuki, 81, Japanese actor (Storm Over the Pacific, Ghidorah, the Three-Headed Monster, The Return of Godzilla), kidney cancer.
- John Pierik, 68, Dutch Olympic shooter (1980, 1984).
- T. V. Rajeswar, 91, Indian police officer. Director of the Intelligence Bureau (1980–1983).
- Anton Regh, 77, German footballer (1. FC Köln).
- Cyrille Regis, 59, English footballer (West Bromwich Albion, Coventry City, Aston Villa), cardiac arrest.
- Samuel A. Schreiner Jr., 96, American writer.
- Milton Shadur, 93, American federal judge, U.S. District Court for the Northern District of Illinois (1980–1992).
- Art Strozier, 71, American football player (San Diego Chargers).
- Marlene VerPlanck, 84, American jazz singer.
- Hugh Wilson, 74, American television producer (WKRP in Cincinnati) and film director (Police Academy, The First Wives Club), lung cancer and emphysema.

=== 15 ===
- Romana Acosta Bañuelos, 92, American public servant, Treasurer of the United States (1971–1974), pneumonia.
- Viktor Anpilov, 72, Russian politician and trade unionist, stroke.
- Sir James Ball, 84, British economist.
- Bob Barton, 76, American baseball player (San Diego Padres, San Francisco Giants), complications from dementia.
- Anshel Brusilow, 89, American violinist and conductor.
- Carl Emil Christiansen, 80, Danish footballer (Esbjerg fB).
- Bogusław Cygan, 53, Polish footballer (Górnik Zabrze, Stal Mielec, Lausanne Sports).
- Moussa Diagana, 71, Mauritanian writer.
- Marianne Eigenheer, 72, Swiss artist.
- Joe Frank, 79, French-born American radio personality (KPFA, KCRW, All Things Considered) and humorist.
- Joachim Gnilka, 89, German Roman Catholic theologian.
- Buddhadev Das Gupta, 84, Indian sarod player, heart attack.
- Alan Hart, 75, British journalist and conspiracy theorist.
- Edwin Hawkins, 74, American gospel pianist and singer ("Oh Happy Day", "Lay Down (Candles in the Rain)"), multiple Grammy winner, pancreatic cancer.
- Raghunath Jha, 78, Indian politician.
- Dick King, 83, American politician, member of the Washington House of Representatives (1965–1994).
- Mathilde Krim, 91, Italian-born American HIV/AIDS researcher.
- Karl-Heinz Kunde, 80, German racing cyclist.
- Samson Kutateladze, 53, Georgian politician and brigadier general, MP (2008–2012), shot.
- Pitoy Moreno, 91, Filipino fashion designer.
- Ava Mukherjee, 88, Indian actress (Devdas, Detective Naani).
- Rosalia Nghidinwa, 65, Namibian politician, Minister of Immigration and Home Affairs (2005–2012) and Gender Equality and Child Welfare (2012–2015), cancer.
- Wendy Nicol, Baroness Nicol, 94, British politician and life peer, member of the House of Lords (since 1983).
- Omid Nooshin, 43, English director (Last Passenger).
- Dolores O'Riordan, 46, Irish singer and guitarist (The Cranberries, D.A.R.K.), drowning due to alcohol intoxication.
- Óscar Alberto Pérez, 36, Venezuelan actor, policeman and CICPC investigator, involved in Caracas helicopter incident, shot.
- Roderick Rijnders, 76, Dutch coxswain, Olympic silver medalist (1968).
- Gnani Sankaran, 64, Indian journalist and writer.
- William Scharf, 90, American artist.
- Mike Shanahan, 78, American professional sports team owner (St. Louis Blues).
- Terje Skarsfjord, 75, Norwegian football manager (Tromsø).
- Sujud Sutrisno, 64, Indonesian street drummer and singer.
- Wilse B. Webb, 97, American psychologist and sleep researcher.
- Peter Wyngarde, 90, British actor (Department S, Jason King, Flash Gordon).

=== 16 ===
- Shammi Akhtar, 60, Bangladeshi playback singer, breast cancer.
- Bill Bain, 80, American management consultant, founder of Bain & Company.
- Joe Baker, 85, Australian marine scientist and rugby league player.
- George Bandy, 72, American politician, member of the Alabama House of Representatives (since 1994), pulmonary and circulatory illness.
- Arthur Davidson, 89, British politician, MP for Accrington (1966–1983), complications from a fall.
- Rubén Oswaldo Díaz, 72, Argentine footballer (Racing Club, Atlético Madrid).
- Bradford Dillman, 87, American actor (Compulsion, The Way We Were, The Enforcer), complications from pneumonia.
- Geevarghese Divannasios Ottathengil, 67, Indian Syro-Malankala Catholic prelate, Bishop of Bathery (1996–2010) and Puthur (2010–2017).
- Jørgen Dobloug, 72, Norwegian artist.
- Ed Doolan, 76, Australian-born British radio presenter, complications of vascular dementia.
- LaFayette Duckett, 99, American politician.
- Rodney Fern, 69, English footballer (Leicester City, Chesterfield), dementia.
- Anatoly Glushenkov, 75, Russian politician, Governor of Smolensk Oblast (1993–1998).
- Kingdon Gould Jr., 94, American diplomat, Ambassador to Luxembourg (1969–1972) and the Netherlands (1973–1976), pneumonia.
- Peter Groeger, 84, German actor and director.
- Tyler Hilinski, 21, American football player (Washington State), suicide by gunshot.
- Dave Holland, 69, English drummer (Judas Priest, Trapeze).
- Madalena Iglésias, 78, Portuguese actress and singer.
- Oliver Ivanović, 64, Kosovar politician, shot.
- Eugeniusz Juretzko, 78, Polish Roman Catholic prelate, Bishop of Yokadouma (1991–2017).
- Liu Zhonghua, 101, Chinese navy admiral.
- Julie Beth Lovins, 72, American computational linguist.
- Eric Luoma, 88, Canadian Olympic cross-country skier (1964).
- Wilhelm Melliger, 64, Swiss equestrian, Olympic silver medalist (1996, 2000), stroke.
- John Monteith, 69, American actor, writer and director.
- Javiera Muñoz, 40, Swedish singer, anorexia nervosa.
- Clem Nettles, 87, American politician.
- Timothy J. O'Connor, 81, American politician, member (1969–1981) and Speaker (1975–1981) of the Vermont House of Representatives.
- Thomas Newman O'Neill Jr., 89, American federal judge, U.S. District Court for the Eastern District of Pennsylvania (1983–1996).
- Moya O'Sullivan, 91, Australian actress (Neighbours, Cop Shop, Hey Dad..!).
- Harold Rosen, 92, American politician, Mayor of Miami Beach, Florida (1974–1977).
- John Spellman, 91, American politician, Governor of Washington (1981–1985), pneumonia.
- Pål Spilling, 83, Norwegian computer scientist.
- Jo Jo White, 71, American Hall of Fame basketball player (Boston Celtics, Golden State Warriors, Kansas City Kings), Olympic champion (1968), pneumonia.

=== 17 ===
- Jahangir Amouzegar, 98, Iranian economist, academic and politician.
- John M. Andrist, 86, American journalist and politician, member of the North Dakota Senate (1993–2014), complications from a stroke.
- Roy Bennett, 60, Zimbabwean politician, MP (2000–2006), helicopter crash.
- John Bindernagel, 76, Canadian biologist and cryptozoologist, cancer.
- Landrum Bolling, 104, American political scientist and academic administrator, president of Earlham College (1958–1973).
- Paul Booth, 74, American political activist.
- Denis Cuspert, 41, German rapper and jihadist, airstrike.
- Brooks Dodge, 88, American Olympic alpine skier (1952, 1956).
- Guy Dupré, 89, French writer and publisher.
- Jonathan Fine, 86, American physician.
- Arnold Gamson, 91, American conductor.
- Mark Genge, 90, English Anglican priest, Bishop of Central Newfoundland (1976–1990).
- Jerzy Gros, 72, Polish Olympic long-distance runner (1976).
- He Yousheng, 86, Chinese hydrodynamicist, member of the Academy of Engineering.
- Robert LaLonde, 59, American economist.
- Edwin Lins, 54, Austrian Olympic wrestler (1984, 1988).
- Ilir Luarasi, 63, Albanian footballer (Dinamo Tirana, national team).
- Ted McCoy, 92, New Zealand architect.
- Ed Moses, 91, American artist and painter.
- Arno Motulsky, 94, German-born American geneticist.
- Raúl Olivo, 96, Venezuelan Olympic sport shooter.
- Bénédicte Pesle, 90, French arts patron.
- Donald E. Polkinghorne, 81, American psychotherapist and scholar.
- Augusto Polo Campos, 85, Peruvian composer.
- Claude Prouvoyeur, 91, French politician, Senator (1983–1992), mayor of Dunkirk (1966–1989).
- Herbert Schmertz, 87, American public relations executive.
- Simon Shelton, 52, British actor (Teletubbies, Incredible Games), hypothermia.

=== 18 ===
- Nathaniel Archibald, 65, American basketball player.
- John Barton, 89, British theatre director, co-founder of the Royal Shakespeare Company.
- Luc Beyer de Ryke, 84, Belgian politician, MEP (1980–1989), aortic rupture.
- Bob Carlton, 67, British theatre director and writer (Return to the Forbidden Planet), cancer.
- Martine Époque, 75, French-born Canadian dance educator and choreographer.
- Eppie Gibson, 90, English rugby league player and coach (Whitehaven R.L.F.C.).
- Wallis Grahn, 72, Swedish actress (Rederiet).
- Ding Guangquan, 73, Chinese comedian.
- Echo Helstrom, 76, American muse (Bob Dylan).
- Kashinath, 67, Indian actor and director (Anubhava, Avale Nanna Hendthi, Avane Nanna Ganda), cancer.
- Ishfaq Ahmad Khan, 87, Pakistani nuclear physicist and professor (Abdus Salam Centre for Physics).
- Chandi Lahiri, 88, Indian cartoonist.
- Julius Lester, 78, American writer (To Be a Slave) and educator.
- Lucas Mangope, 94, South African politician, President of Bophuthatswana (1977–1994).
- Carla Marangoni, 102, Italian gymnast, Olympic silver medalist (1928).
- Peter Mayle, 78, British author (A Year in Provence, A Good Year).
- Laurie Morgan, 87, British government official, Chief Minister of Guernsey (2004–2007).
- Steve Nisbett, 69, Nevisian-born British reggae drummer (Steel Pulse).
- Nancy Richler, 60, Canadian novelist, cancer.
- Edward C. Rochette, 90, American numismatist.
- B. L. Shaw, 84, American politician.
- Anthony Allen Shore, 55, American serial killer and rapist, execution by lethal injection.
- Henry Soles Jr., 82, American chaplain and author.
- Borys Steklyar, 95, Ukrainian military officer.
- Yasuo Tanaka, 86, Japanese astrophysicist.
- Mae Tischer, 89, American politician.
- Stansfield Turner, 94, American admiral, Director of Central Intelligence (1977–1981).
- Joseph Wang Yu-jung, 86, Taiwanese Roman Catholic prelate, Bishop of Taichung (1986–2009).
- Florence Robinson Weber, 96, American geologist.
- Chick Webster, 97, Canadian ice hockey player (New York Rangers).
- Barry Wilde, 89, Australian politician, member of the New South Wales Legislative Assembly for Parramatta (1976–1988).

=== 19 ===
- Dik Abed, 73, South African-born Dutch cricketer.
- Munnu Bhai, 84, Pakistani journalist.
- Harvey R. Blau, 82, American attorney and executive.
- Ute Bock, 75, Austrian educator and humanitarian.
- Lin Bolen, 76, American television executive and producer.
- James C. Browne, 83, American computer scientist.
- Anna Campori, 100, Italian actress (Neapolitan Turk, The Overtaxed).
- Geoffrey Caston, 91, British academic administrator and civil servant.
- Olivia Cole, 75, American actress (Roots, Backstairs at the White House, Brewster Place), Emmy Award winner (1977), heart attack.
- John Conboy, 83, American television producer (The Young and the Restless).
- Joseph Consentino, 80, American television director.
- Maurice Couture, 91, Canadian Roman Catholic prelate, Archbishop of Québec (1990–2002).
- Alain Devaquet, 75, French politician, Minister of National Education, Higher Education and Research (1986) and MP (1978–1981, 1988–1997).
- Saqi Farooqi, 81, Pakistani poet.
- Red Fisher, 91, Canadian hockey journalist (Montreal Star, Montreal Gazette).
- Marcel Frémiot, 98, French composer and musicologist.
- Célio de Oliveira Goulart, 73, Brazilian Roman Catholic prelate, Bishop of São João del Rei (since 2010).
- Pavel Kazankov, 91, Russian Olympic racewalker (1952).
- David M. Knight, 81, British historian of science.
- Ferdinand Knobloch, 101, Czech-Canadian psychiatrist.
- Ed LaForge, 82, American politician, member of the Michigan House of Representatives (1994–2000), heart disease.
- Dorothy Malone, 93, American actress (Written on the Wind, Peyton Place, Too Much, Too Soon), Oscar winner (1956).
- Fredo Santana, 27, American rapper, kidney failure.
- Allison Shearmur, 54, American film producer (The Hunger Games, Rogue One, Cinderella), complications from lung cancer.
- Moose Stubing, 79, American baseball player (California Angels).
- Lutho Tapela, Zimbabwean politician, Senator (2005–2013).
- Sriniwas Tiwari, 93, Indian politician, Speaker of the Madhya Pradesh Legislative Assembly (1993–2003).
- Barbara Weil, 84, American artist.
- Leslie Wyche, 73, American community activist.

=== 20 ===
- Dame Beulah Bewley, 88, British physician.
- Paul Bocuse, 91, French chef, Parkinson's disease.
- Wendell Castle, 85, American furniture designer and artist.
- John Coleman, 83, American meteorologist, co-founder of The Weather Channel.
- William Cousins, 90, American judge (Illinois Appellate Court), Chicago City Council member (1967–1976).
- Terry Evans, 80, American blues and soul singer, songwriter and guitarist.
- Naomi Parker Fraley, 96, American naval machinist, inspiration for the "We Can Do It!" poster.
- Antonius Jan Glazemaker, 86, Dutch Old Catholic prelate, Archbishop of Utrecht (1982–2000).
- Bill Johnson, 57, American baseball player (Chicago Cubs).
- Jerry Keeling, 78, American-born Canadian football player (Calgary Stampeders, Ottawa Rough Riders, Hamilton Tiger-Cats).
- Graeme Langlands, 76, Australian rugby league footballer (St. George Dragons, national team).
- Howard Lew Lewis, 76, English comedian and actor (Brush Strokes, Maid Marian and Her Merry Men, Chelmsford 123).
- Sylvester Carmel Magro, 76, Maltese Roman Catholic prelate, Apostolic Vicar of Benghazi (1997–2016).
- Tracey Moore, 76, English cricketer (Norfolk, Minor Counties North, Minor Counties East), cancer.
- Hasmukh Patel, 84, Indian architect.
- William Rees, 89, British veterinarian, Chief Veterinary Officer (1980–1988).
- Jim Rodford, 76, English bassist (Argent, The Kinks, The Zombies), injuries from a fall.
- Doron Rubin, 74, Israeli military officer.
- Harry Selby, 92, South African hunter.
- Bob Smith, 59, American comedian (Funny Gay Males) and author, amyotrophic lateral sclerosis.
- Miyako Sumiyoshi, 30, Japanese Olympic speed skater (2014).
- Bob Vespaziani, 82, American-born Canadian football coach (Calgary Stampeders, BC Lions, Winnipeg Blue Bombers).
- Jack Whitten, 78, American artist.

=== 21 ===
- Yves Afonso, 73, French actor (The Clockmaker, Weekend, One Deadly Summer).
- Gavin Arneil, 94, Scottish pediatric nephrologist.
- Gianni Bongioanni, 96, Italian film director and screenwriter.
- Chartchai Chionoi, 75, Thai boxer, WBC (1968–1969, 1970) and WBA World Flyweight Champion (1973–1974).
- Khagen Das, 79, Indian politician, MP for Tripura West (2002–2004, 2004–2014), heart attack.
- Bruno Giacosa, 88, Italian winemaker.
- Philippe Gondet, 75, French footballer (Nantes, Red Star, national team).
- Jock Haswell, 98, British military historian and intelligence officer.
- Tsukasa Hosaka, 80, Japanese footballer (Furukawa Electric), pneumonia.
- A. Dean Jeffs, 89, American politician.
- Jim Johannson, 53, American ice hockey player (Indianapolis Ice, Milwaukee Admirals) and executive (USA Hockey).
- Jun Tae-soo, 33, South Korean actor (All My Love For You).
- Sille Lundquist, 47, Danish model and fashion model.
- Lyle Mehrkens, 80, American politician, member of the Minnesota House of Representatives (1979–1982) and Senate (1983–1992).
- Susumu Nishibe, 78, Japanese philosopher and economist, suicide.
- Jens Okking, 78, Danish actor (The Kingdom, One-Hand Clapping) and politician, MEP (1999–2003).
- Pasquale Panìco, 91, Italian politician, Senator (1979–1992).
- David Pithey, 81, South African cricketer.
- Jose Santos Rios, 78, Northern Mariana Island politician, Mayor of Saipan (1982–1986).
- Connie Sawyer, 105, American actress (Dumb and Dumber, Pineapple Express, When Harry Met Sally...), heart attack.
- Ken Seddon, 67, British chemist.
- Michael Selby, 82, British-born New Zealand geomorphologist.
- Paul Sun, 80, Taiwanese politician, Minister of Agriculture (1992–1996), pancreatic cancer.

=== 22 ===
- Jimmy Armfield, 82, English football player (Blackpool, national team) and manager (Leeds United), world champion (1966), non-Hodgkin lymphoma.
- K. B. Asante, 93, Ghanaian diplomat, Ambassador to Switzerland (1967–1972) and the European Economic Community (1976–1978).
- Ian Bennett, 69, Canadian civil servant, President of the Royal Canadian Mint (2006–2014).
- Carl Blair, 85, American painter and sculptor.
- Andrew Carroll, 32, American ice hockey player (Idaho Steelheads, Minnesota-Duluth Bulldogs), suicide by jumping.
- Shorty Castro, 89, Puerto Rican comedian, songwriter and entertainer, cancer.
- Kudzai Chimbaira, 32, Zimbabwean actor.
- Johnny Cowell, 92, Canadian trumpeter and arranger.
- Patrick Delaforce, 94, British army officer and historian.
- Peter Diversi, 85, Australian rugby league footballer (North Sydney Bears, Manly Warringah Sea Eagles).
- Jack Doms, 91, New Zealand swimmer, British Empire and Commonwealth Games champion (1954).
- Dale Engstrom, 100, American politician, member of the Tennessee House of Representatives (1970–1972).
- Nolan Flemmer, 79, South African cricketer.
- Emilio Gastón, 83, Spanish poet and politician, MP (1977–1979) and Justicia de Aragón (1987–1993).
- Billy Hancock, 71, American musician.
- Leon Hill, 81, Australian cricketer.
- William B. Jordan, 77, American art historian.
- Reinier Kreijermaat, 82, Dutch footballer (Feyenoord, USV Elinkwijk, Xerxes/DHC).
- Ursula K. Le Guin, 88, American science fiction writer (A Wizard of Earthsea, The Left Hand of Darkness, The Dispossessed).
- Ceylon Manohar, 73, Indian actor and playback singer ("Surangani").
- William Joseph McDonough, 83, American banker, president of the Federal Reserve Bank of New York (1993–2003).
- Dahiru Musdapher, 75, Nigerian justice, Chief Justice (2011–2012).
- Angelo F. Orazio, 91, American politician.
- Preston Shannon, 70, American blues singer, songwriter and guitarist, cancer.
- Francis Sheppard, 96, British historian and writer.
- Kevin Tate, 74, New Zealand soil chemist.
- Annie Young, 75, American politician, chronic obstructive pulmonary disease.

=== 23 ===
- Anders Åberg, 72, Swedish sculptor and painter.
- Else Amann, 94, German Olympic cross-country skier.
- Mohammed Al-Mfarah, 72, Saudi Arabian actor.
- Ruth Alas, 57, Estonian economist.
- Bill Butler, 67, American football player (New Orleans Saints).
- Henry Dalzell-Payne, 88, British army general.
- Nepal Chandra Das, 73, Indian politician.
- Robert Dowdell, 85, American actor (Stoney Burke, Voyage to the Bottom of the Sea).
- Robert Kisanga, 84, Tanzanian judge.
- Francisco Moreno Martínez, 86, Spanish cyclist.
- Hugh Masekela, 78, South African jazz trumpeter ("Grazing in the Grass", "Bring Him Back Home") and composer ("Soweto Blues"), prostate cancer.
- Nicanor Parra, 103, Chilean poet.
- Janno Reiljan, 68, Estonian economist and politician, MP (1999–2004), MEP (2004).
- Marcelo Romo, 76, Chilean actor (Enough Praying).
- Galen L. Stone, 96, American diplomat, Ambassador to Cyprus (1978–1981), lymphoma.
- Ezra Swerdlow, 64, American film producer (Spaceballs, 21 Jump Street, Zombieland), complications from pancreatic cancer and ALS.
- Sys NS, 61, Indonesian actor, director and politician, member of the People's Consultative Assembly (1999–2004).
- Wyatt Tee Walker, 88, American civil rights activist and pastor.
- Lari White, 52, American country singer ("Now I Know", "That's My Baby") and actress (Cast Away), peritoneal cancer.
- Richard Woollacott, 40, British racehorse trainer, suicide.

=== 24 ===
- Sergio Benedetti, 75, Italian art historian and curator.
- Bill Budness, 74, American football player (Oakland Raiders).
- Marcos Carvajal, 33, Venezuelan baseball player (Colorado Rockies, Florida Marlins), pneumonia.
- Virginia A. Clark, 89, American statistician.
- Gonzalo Facio Segreda, 99, Costa Rican politician, Minister of Foreign Affairs (1970–1978), President of the Legislative Assembly (1953–1956), Ambassador to the United States (1956–1958, 1962–1966, 1990–1994).
- Renaud Gagneux, 70, French composer.
- Johnny Jackson Jr., 74, American politician.
- Jack Ketchum, 71, American novelist (The Girl Next Door, Off Season) and screenwriter (Offspring), cancer.
- Aleksandrs Kublinskis, 81, Latvian composer.
- Krishna Kumari, 84, Indian actress (Pathala Bhairavi), bone marrow cancer.
- Bruce Light, 68, Australian football player (Port Adelaide).
- Sir Douglas Lowe, 95, British air chief marshal.
- Warren Miller, 93, American ski and snowboarding filmmaker.
- Julio Navarro, 82, Puerto Rican baseball player (Los Angeles Angels, Detroit Tigers, Atlanta Braves), complications from Alzheimer's.
- Raymond Nimmer, 73, American legal scholar.
- Pedro Pérez Fernández, 68, Spanish economist.
- Matti Rissanen, 80, Finnish philologist.
- Mark E. Smith, 60, English singer and songwriter (The Fall), lung and kidney cancer.
- Jan Steeman, 74, Dutch comics artist (Roel Dijkstra, Noortje), kidney failure.
- Attila Verestóy, 63, Romanian politician and chemical engineer, Senator (since 1990).

=== 25 ===
- Claribel Alegría, 93, Nicaraguan poet.
- Shawkat Ali, 81, Bangladeshi author.
- Tommy Banks, 81, Canadian jazz pianist, composer and politician, Senator (2000–2011), Juno winner (1979), leukemia.
- Hope Black, 98, Australian marine biologist.
- Daniel M. Buechlein, 79, American Roman Catholic prelate, Archbishop of Indianapolis (1992–2011).
- Walter Buckpesch, 93, German politician, Mayor of Offenbach am Main (1974–1980), MP (1983–1987).
- Glen Clark, 77, American baseball player (Atlanta Braves).
- Jay Curtis, 67, American writer and television producer (Disasterpiece Theatre), complications from amyotrophic lateral sclerosis.
- W. P. C. Davies, 89, English rugby union player (Harlequins, national team, British and Irish Lions).
- Neagu Djuvara, 101, Romanian historian, essayist and philosopher, pneumonia.
- Dan Foster, 87, American medical researcher.
- Steve Foster, 71, Australian singer-songwriter, lung cancer.
- Shirley Garms, 94, American tenpin bowler.
- Arnaud Giovaninetti, 50, French actor.
- Haripal Kaushik, 83, Indian field hockey player, Olympic gold medalist (1956, 1964), dementia.
- Sabar Koti, 58, Indian singer.
- Peter von Krockow, 82, German Olympic fencer.
- Bill Logan, 83, American basketball player (Iowa Hawkeyes).
- Patrick Mazimhaka, 69, Rwandan politician.
- Floyd Miles, 74, American blues guitarist, singer and songwriter.
- John Morris, 91, American film composer (The Elephant Man, Blazing Saddles, Dirty Dancing), respiratory infection.
- Jerome P. Peterson, 81, American politician.
- Keith Pring, 74, Welsh footballer (Rotherham United, national team).
- Lyudmila Senchina, 67, Russian singer.
- Ghassan Shakaa, 74, Palestinian politician, Mayor of Nablus (1994–2004, 2012–2015).
- Giuseppe Vitucci, 67, Italian Olympic wrestler (1976).
- Cliff White, 72, British music journalist, cardiac arrest.
- Graham Williams, 72, New Zealand rugby union player (Wellington, national team).

=== 26 ===
- Shambhu Bhattacharya, 83, Indian actor.
- Kendall Carly Browne, 99, American actress (Dreamscape, Alligator).
- Buzz Clifford, 75, American singer ("Baby Sittin' Boogie") and songwriter, complications of influenza.
- Raphael Cruz, 31, American acrobat and actor (Iris), heart and lung failure.
- José Gabriel Diaz Cueva, 92, Ecuadorian Roman Catholic prelate, Bishop of Azogues (1968–1975).
- Supriya Devi, 85, Indian actress (Meghe Dhaka Tara), heart attack.
- Michael Gear, 83, British Anglican prelate, Bishop of Doncaster (1993–1999).
- Cellestine Hannemann, 93, American author.
- Elizabeth Hawley, 94, American journalist and Himalayan expedition historian.
- Joe M. Haynes, 81, American politician, member of the Tennessee Senate (1985–2012).
- Von G. Keetch, 57, American religious leader, General Authority of the LDS Church (since 2015).
- Jacques Languirand, 86, Canadian radio host, writer and actor (Mars and April), Alzheimer's disease.
- Jack Law, 93, Australian footballer (Footscray).
- Alfred Léonard, 78, Belgian politician, MP (1985-1991), Mayor of Ferrières (1977–1992).
- Hiromu Nonaka, 92, Japanese politician, member of the House of Representatives (1983–2003), Chief Cabinet Secretary (1998–1999).
- Yukiaki Okabe, 76, Japanese swimmer, Olympic bronze medalist (1964), pneumonia.
- John Salas, 70, Guamanian academic and politician, President of the University of Guam, member of the Legislature of Guam (1999–2003), complications of diabetes.
- Francisco Savín, 88, Mexican conductor and composer (Xalapa Symphony Orchestra).
- José Arturo Sierra, 72, Guatemalan judge, President of the Supreme Court (2013–2014), shot.
- So Chau Yim-ping, 90, Hong Kong executive and politician.
- Alec Southwell, 91, Australian judge.
- Michael Wright, 105, Hong Kong architect, Director of Public Works (1963–69).
- Cyrus Yavneh, 76, American producer (24, Supernatural, Nothing Sacred), lung cancer.
- Isaiah Zeldin, 97, American Reform rabbi, founder of Stephen S. Wise Temple.
- Igor Zhukov, 81, Russian pianist.

=== 27 ===
- Robert McCormick Adams Jr., 91, American anthropologist.
- Niki Bettendorf, 81, Luxembourgish politician, MP (1990–2006).
- Fred van der Blij, 94, Dutch mathematician.
- Adele Boyd, 85, American field hockey player and coach.
- Jerry Butler, 58, American pornographic actor, cancer.
- Barbara Calder, 93, British sailor, dementia.
- Peter Casey, 82, Irish horse trainer.
- Sir Alan Dawtry, 102, British local government official, chief executive of Westminster City Council (1956–1977).
- Maryo J. de los Reyes, 65, Filipino director (Magnifico), heart attack.
- Royal Galipeau, 71, Canadian politician, MP (2006–2015), multiple myeloma.
- Iryna Horoshko, 64, Ukrainian choreographer and dancer, cancer.
- Alfred Hübler, 60, German-born American physicist, lymphoma.
- Gurcharan Singh Kalkat, 91, Indian agricultural scientist.
- Ingvar Kamprad, 91, Swedish retail furniture-home design executive and philanthropist, founder of IKEA, pneumonia.
- Tomasz Mackiewicz, 42, Polish mountain climber.
- Göran Nicklasson, 75, Swedish footballer.
- Robert Parry, 68, American investigative journalist, complications of a stroke.
- Edmundo Pedro, 99, Portuguese politician and political prisoner (Tarrafal camp), member of the Assembly of the Republic (1976–1980, 1983–1985, 1987–1991).
- Dennis Peron, 72, American cannabis and LGBT activist, lung cancer.
- Tadashi Sawashima, 92, Japanese film director (Shinsengumi), multiple organ failure.
- Jerry Sneva, 68, American racing driver (CART).
- Mereoni Vibose, 66, Fijian athlete.
- Mort Walker, 94, American comics artist (Beetle Bailey, Hi and Lois, Boner's Ark), pneumonia.
- John Wall, 85, British engineer and inventor (Crayford focuser).
- Lawrence Weiskrantz, 91, British psychologist.

=== 28 ===
- Hassa bint Mohammed Al Nahyan, 95, Emirati royal.
- Bhanu Gupta, 87, Indian musician.
- Jan Erik Hansen, 77, Norwegian Olympic ice hockey player.
- Ernest Hawkins, 91, American football coach (East Texas State).
- Hsu Hung-chih, 81, Taiwanese politician, Taoyuan County Magistrate (1981–1989), lung cancer.
- Jacquie Jones, 52, American filmmaker, cancer.
- Gennady Kazmin, 83, Russian politician.
- Rolf Lacour, 80, German Olympic wrestler (1964, 1968, 1972), world championship silver medalist (1965).
- Raymond Lory, 91, French politician.
- Antônio Agostinho Marochi, 92, Brazilian Roman Catholic prelate, Bishop of Presidente Prudente (1976–2002).
- József Merényi, 89, Hungarian Olympic speed skater (1952).
- Dean A. Miller, 86, American historian.
- Maxwell Valentine Noronha, 91, Indian Roman Catholic prelate, Bishop of Calicut (1980–2002).
- Dharmasena Pathiraja, 74, Sri Lankan film director and screenwriter.
- Ettore Peretti, 59, Italian politician, Deputy (2006–2008), heart attack.
- Robert Pincus-Witten, 82, American art critic, curator and art historian.
- Jan Ramberg, 85, Swedish lawyer.
- Richard Rusk, 71, American environmental activist.
- Dinesh Nandan Sahay, 81, Indian politician, Governor of Chhattisgarh (2000–2003) and Tripura (2003–2009).
- Coco Schumann, 93, German jazz guitarist.
- Ousmane Seck, 79, Senegalese politician, Minister of the Economy and Finance (1978–1983).
- Gene Sharp, 90, American political scientist and nonviolence advocate.
- Richard H. Tomlinson, 94, Canadian chemist and philanthropist.
- Ignacio Verdura, 86, Argentine Olympic equestrian (1960).
- Reg Webb, 70, British musician.
- Sergei Yakhontov, 91, Russian linguist.

=== 29 ===
- Paul Alcock, 64, English football referee, cancer.
- José Aristegui, 89, Spanish Olympic rower.
- John Bickersteth, 96, British Anglican prelate, Bishop of Bath and Wells (1975–1986).
- Asmund Bjørken, 84, Norwegian jazz saxophonist, accordionist and bukkehorn player.
- Ion Ciubuc, 74, Moldovan politician, Prime Minister (1997–1999).
- Aga Syed Mohammad Fazlullah, 70, Indian Islamic scholar and cleric.
- Alf Gooding, 85, Welsh executive (Catnic).
- Douglas Jackson, 75, Scottish rugby union player.
- Vic Keeble, 87, English footballer (Colchester, Newcastle, West Ham).
- Anthony Kemp, 78, English military historian.
- Hilton McConnico, 74, American designer.
- Rick McKay, 57, American filmmaker (Broadway: The Golden Age, by the Legends Who Were There).
- Robert D. McWethy, 98, American submarine captain.
- Jinadasa Niyathapala, 88, Sri Lankan politician.
- Eddie Shaw, 80, American blues saxophonist, arranger and bandleader (Howlin' Wolf).
- Stewart Sutherland, Baron Sutherland of Houndwood, 76, Scottish academic and life peer.
- Jay Switzer, 61, Canadian television executive (Citytv), brain cancer.
- Sir Cyril Taylor, 82, British educator.
- Clive van Ryneveld, 89, South African cricketer (national team).
- Marek Wisła, 60, Polish Olympic sprint canoer (1980).
- Ronald J. Wonnacott, 87, Canadian economist.
- Al Zerhusen, 86, American Olympic soccer player.

=== 30 ===
- Bjørn Boysen, 74, Norwegian organist.
- Sir Henry Brooke, 81, British lawyer and judge, Lord Justice of Appeal (1996–2006), complications from cardiac surgery.
- Romano Cagnoni, 82, Italian photographer.
- Ian R. Gibbons, 86, British biophysicist.
- Andreas Gruschke, 57, German author and sinologist.
- Hannah Hauxwell, 91, English farmer.
- John W. Kern III, 89, American judge, complications from pneumonia and Alzheimer's disease.
- Charles E. Lindblom, 100, American academic.
- Pamela Mastropietro, 18, Italian murder victim, stabbed.
- James McCray, 79, American opera singer and teacher.
- Pat McLoughney, 68, Irish hurler (Offaly GAA).
- Bárbaro Morgan, 66, Cuban Olympic wrestler (1972, 1976, 1980).
- Richard Murphy, 90, Irish poet.
- Joaquín Rojas, 79, Filipino Olympic basketball player (1968).
- Mark Salling, 35, American actor (Glee) and musician, suicide by hanging.
- Rolf Schafstall, 80, German football player and manager (MSV Duisburg, VfL Bochum, Bayer 05 Uerdingen).
- Clyde Scott, 93, American football player (Philadelphia Eagles, Detroit Lions) and hurdler, Olympic silver medalist (1948).
- Victor W. Sidel, 86, American physician.
- Marilyn Simmons, 69, American chess player, cancer.
- Elisabeth Sveri, 90, Norwegian military officer.
- Kevin Towers, 56, American baseball executive (San Diego Padres, Arizona Diamondbacks), thyroid cancer.
- Chintaman Vanaga, 67, Indian politician, heart attack.
- Terry Van Ginderen, 86, Belgian children's TV host (Kom Toch Eens Kijken), theatrical producer and music producer, pneumonia.
- Azeglio Vicini, 84, Italian football player (Sampdoria) and manager (Udinese, national team).
- Ron Walker, 78, Australian sports promoter, property developer and politician, Lord Mayor of Melbourne (1974–1976), melanoma.
- Philip Woodward, 98, British mathematician and radar engineer.
- Junji Yayoshi, 49, Japanese guitarist and record producer.
- Louis Zorich, 93, American actor (Mad About You, Brooklyn Bridge, The Muppets Take Manhattan).

=== 31 ===
- Dan Alon, 72, Israeli Olympic fencer (1972) and survivor of the Munich massacre, cancer.
- Haradin Bala, 60, Kosovan war criminal, cancer.
- Richard N. Berry, 102, American politician.
- Piet Bleeker, 89, Dutch long-distance runner.
- Pat Booth, 88, New Zealand investigative journalist (Arthur Allan Thomas case, Mr Asia crime syndicates).
- Rasual Butler, 38, American basketball player (Miami Heat, New Orleans Hornets, Los Angeles Clippers), traffic collision.
- Erwin de Vries, 88, Surinamese painter and artist.
- Del Delker, 93, American gospel singer (Voice of Prophecy).
- Alexander Dick, 95, Australian cricketer.
- Gabriel Fackre, 91, American theologian.
- Oscar Gamble, 68, American baseball player (New York Yankees, Cleveland Indians, Philadelphia Phillies), ameloblastic carcinoma.
- Ann Gillis, 90, American actress (The Adventures of Tom Sawyer, Bambi, 2001: A Space Odyssey).
- Haim Gouri, 94, Israeli poet.
- Jack Halpern, 93, American chemist.
- Elizabeth Hartley, 75, American archaeologist and curator.
- Hennie Hollink, 86, Dutch football player and manager.
- Alf Humphreys, 64, Canadian actor (My Bloody Valentine, First Blood, Diary of a Wimpy Kid), brain cancer.
- Hwang Byungki, 81, South Korean gayageum player, pneumonia.
- Itokin, 38, Japanese MC and track maker, lung cancer.
- Leonid Kadeniuk, 67, Ukrainian first cosmonaut (STS-87).
- Peter King, 5th Earl of Lovelace, 66, British peer.
- Leah LaBelle, 31, Canadian-born American singer (American Idol), traffic collision.
- Olavi Mäenpää, 67, Finnish politician.
- István Marosi, 73, Hungarian Olympic handball player (1972).
- John Fitzallen Moore, 89, American physicist.
- William O'Connor, 47, American artist (Dungeons & Dragons, Magic: The Gathering).
- Tadashi Sasaki, 102, Japanese engineer.
- Khristo Tsvetkov, 83, Bulgarian Olympic basketball player.
