= Mbacké (surname) =

Mbacké is a Senegalese surname that may refer to

- Serigne Saliou Mbacké (1915–2007), Grand Marabout (leader) of the Mouride movement in Senegal
- Serigne Mouhamadou Lamine Bara Mbacké (c.1925–2010), Grand Marabout of the Mouride movement in Senegal
