= Senator Langley =

Senator Langley may refer to:

- Brian Langley (fl. 2000s–2010s), Maine State Senate
- Byron Langley (1926–2018), North Dakota State Senate
- Dick Langley (1937–2017), Florida State Senate
- Walter B. Langley (1921–1976), New York State Senate
