= Jose Santos (disambiguation) =

José A. Santos (born 1961) is a retired Chilean thoroughbred jockey.

Jose Santos or José Santos may also refer to:

- José Santos Becerra
- José Santos Chocano (1875–1934)
- José Santos González Vera (1897–1970), a Chilean anarchist writer
- José Santos Guardiola (1816–1862)
- José Santos Quinteros (1865–1951), a Bolivian lawyer, professor and politician
- José Santos Poyatos (born 1962), an athlete from Spain
- José Santos Ramírez (c. 1790–1851), an Argentine soldier
- Jose Santos Rios (1939–2018), a Northern Mariana Islands politician
- José Santos Romero (born 1951), an Argentine football manager and former player
- José Santos Salas (1888–1955), a Chilean physician and politician
- José Santos Valdés (born 1997), a Mexican sport shooter
- José Santos Zelaya (1853–1919), President of Nicaragua
- José Santos, a pseudonym of the American composer Lee Orean Smith
