= KULP =

- El Campo, Texas; United States
- Broadcast area: El Campo, Texas; Bay City, Texas; Wharton, Texas
- Frequency: 1390 kHz
- Branding: "The Texas Legend Live & Local"

Programming
- Format: Country music

Ownership
- Owner: Wharton County Radio, Inc.

History
- First air date: April 13, 1948 (78 years ago)
- Call sign meaning: Reflects the nickname of Louis "Culp" Krueger; original majority owner

Technical information
- Licensing authority: FCC
- Facility ID: 3710
- Class: D
- Power: 500 watts day, 180 watts night
- Transmitter coordinates: 29°12′34.9″N 95°15′50.9″W
- Translator: 106.7 MHz K294DD (El Campo)

Links
- Public license information: Public file; LMS
- Webcast: Listen Live
- Website: https://www.kulpradio.com/

KULP (1390 AM, 106.7 FM) is a radio station, paired with an AM revitalization FM relay translator, licensed to El Campo, Texas. The station airs a country music format and is owned by Wharton County Radio, Inc.

== History ==
=== Early years of KULP radio ===
With $4,000 in the bank, Louis Thurmond “Culp” Krueger filed an Application for a New Standard Broadcast Station Construction Permit with the Federal Communications Commission on January 8, 1947.

Joining Culp in realizing his dream of giving the Rice Belt its first local radio station were Lafayette Lionel Duckett, Charles Coppage Ingram, J. Edward Johnson and Ross Bohannon. Together they formed Wharton County Broadcasting Company.

Since Culp owned 60% of the company, all that needed to be done was to change the letter “C” to a “K” (required by the FCC), and KULP was born.

On Tuesday April 13, 1948, at 7 am KULP signed on the air at 1390 kHz with five minutes of music followed by a five-minute newscast read by Bill Lamb. Max Westerholm's farm program ran until 7:30 a.m. when the “Lucky 1390” program featuring popular music and requests took to the air waves.

The “Polka Parade” followed the “Lucky 1390” program at 8 am and ran until 9 am Monday through Friday. The Polka Parade featured local and area Czech Polka Bands. In the very early days it was not uncommon to have a band just "show up" and play live in the studio.

Long before "America's Most Wanted," KULP Radio gave Sheriff "Buckshot" Lane an early morning 15-minute "program" six days a week, where he would tell individuals with warrants to turn themselves in. Many did. You would hear Buckshot say "It's 7 am, 56 degrees and John Johnson, if you're listening, don't make me come get you!"

KULP remained under the ownership of Wharton County Broadcasting until 1967 when the FCC granted an application to assign the radio station license to Bar-B Broadcasting, headed by Fred Barbee owner of the El Campo Leader-News newspaper.

=== KULP today ===
In 2000, KULP was purchased by Wharton County Radio Inc.

On January 12, 2017, a deal between Wharton County Radio, Inc. and E-string Wireless, LTD. was consummated. Through the purchase, Wharton County Radio acquired an FM translator, then licensed as K256AT on channel 256 (99.1 MHz) in Nacogdoches, for KULP through the AM Revitalization Plan issued by the Federal Communications Commission. A Minor Modification to K256AT was granted on November 15, 2016, which allowed the translator to move from Nacogdoches to a site off of Oliva St., near Friendship Park in El Campo. The translator would also move to channel 294 (106.7 MHz), as it can not remain on its current operating channel due to short spacing issues with co-operating channel KODA on Senior Road in Missouri City.

A license for the translator to operate from its new facilities as K294DD was issued on April 19, 2017.
