= Cellestine Hannemann =

American writer (1924–2018)

- Born: March 28, 1924 Chicago, Illinois, U.S.
- Died: January 26, 2018 (aged 93)
- Occupation: Author

Cellestine "Sally" Hannemann (March 28, 1924 – January 26, 2018) was an American author and pioneering figure in the methodology of Oshibana art. Hannemann, née Hofmann, born in Chicago, Illinois, lived in the San Fernando Valley of Southern California. She was best known for developing new processes in the pressing of botanical materials to reduce discoloration and shrinkage. She manufactured a unique press incorporating polyester materials to cushion the plants that became known as "Cellestine's Press," and authored a book that is a popular reference guide for plant pressers and Oshibana artists. Hannemann also wrote two novels.

== Invention and publication ==
In the 1970s, Hannemann designed a unique spring-loaded press to preserve and gently but expertly press flowers. This press was a major advancement over traditional pressing methods that had been practiced since the Victorian era of flower pressing. She followed with publication of a guide book, Glorious Pressed Flower Projects, in 1991 that shared her technical expertise. This book is used as a source book on the art of pressed flowers. Hannemann has influenced the work of other pressers who employ her specific techniques for botanical preservation and application that are described in her book. In 1996, "Handcraft Illustrated" quarterly published an article with Hannemann's instructions for making this cushioned and padded press and included tips for creating pressed materials for Oshibana works of art.

== Recognition ==
- Dedication to Cellestine Hanneman, Exhibition Catalog, 2014.
- Best in Show Award named the Cellestine Hannemann Award, World Wide Pressed Flower Guild Exhibition, Guangzhou, China, 2010

== Affiliation ==
- Member, World Wide Pressed Flower Guild

== Selected works ==
- Hannemann, Cellestine (1991). Glorious Pressed Flower Projects. New York: Sterling Publishing Co., Inc. ISBN 0-8069-7350-1.
- Hannemann, Cellestine (2012). Another Time, Another Place. Bloomington, Indiana: Westbow Press. ISBN 978-1-4497-7238-3.
- Hannemann, Cellestine (2012). The House on Moody Street. Bloomington, Indiana: Westbow Press. ISBN 978-1-4497-6819-5.
