= Oscar Gamble =

American baseball player (1949–2018)

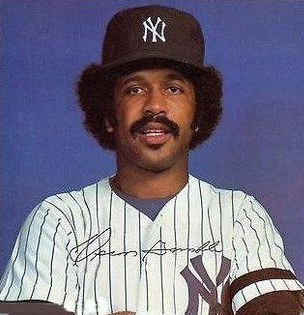
- Gamble in 1981
- Outfielder / Designated hitter
- Born: December 20, 1949; Ramer, Alabama, U.S.
- Died: January 31, 2018 (aged 68); Birmingham, Alabama, U.S.
- Batted: Left Threw: Right

MLB debut
- August 27, 1969, for the Chicago Cubs

Last MLB appearance
- August 8, 1985, for the Chicago White Sox

MLB statistics
- Batting average: .265
- Home runs: 200
- Runs batted in: 666
- Stats at Baseball Reference

Teams
- Chicago Cubs (1969); Philadelphia Phillies (1970–1972); Cleveland Indians (1973–1975); New York Yankees (1976); Chicago White Sox (1977); San Diego Padres (1978); Texas Rangers (1979); New York Yankees (1979–1984); Chicago White Sox (1985)

Oscar Charles Gamble (December 20, 1949 – January 31, 2018) was an American professional baseball outfielder and designated hitter who played in Major League Baseball (MLB) for 17 seasons from 1969 to 1985 for seven teams: the Chicago White Sox and New York Yankees (on two occasions, each); as well as the Chicago Cubs, Philadelphia Phillies, Cleveland Indians, San Diego Padres, and Texas Rangers.

His quote about the Yankees' disorganization and circus-like atmosphere, "They don't think it be like it is, but it do", has also been called one of baseball's "immortal lines" by sportswriter Dan Epstein.

== Biography ==
Gamble was born in Ramer, Alabama, to Sam Gamble, a sharecropper and Mamie Scott, a homemaker. He attended George Washington Carver High School (Montgomery, Alabama) and was discovered playing baseball in a semi-professional league by legendary Negro league baseball player Buck O'Neil, who was working as a scout for the Chicago Cubs at the time. O'Neil convinced the Cubs to draft Gamble, which they did in the sixteenth round.

Gamble played with the Caldwell Cubs of the Pioneer League in 1968 and the San Antonio Missions of the Texas League in 1969, from where he received his call-up to the Chicago Cubs late in the 1969 season.

He was traded along with Roger Freed by the Phillies to the Indians for Del Unser and minor league third baseman Terry Wedgewood on December 1, 1972.

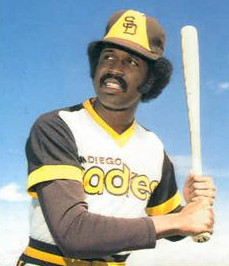
Gamble in 1978

Nicknamed the Big O by Yankees announcer Phil Rizzuto, Gamble was a great baseball player given the amount of time he was allowed to play in the game. Despite the limited playing time, he still hit 200 career home runs in just over 4,500 major league at bats, earning him the moniker "Ratio Man." Oscar's career peaked in 1977 with the White Sox, when he hit 31 home runs and tallied 83 RBI. That year, Gamble hit a home run per 13.2 at-bats, the best ratio in the league. After an ill-fated, injury-plagued year in San Diego, he returned to the American League in 1979 to hit a career-best .358 batting average, slamming 19 home runs with the Yankees and Rangers. (He did not have enough plate appearances to qualify for the American League batting title.)

Unlike some players who failed to cope with the New York media, Oscar thrived on it, and was always a favorite with sportswriters. Gamble, whose hitting prowess was overshadowed by his famously large Afro hairdo, has the distinction of logging the last hit and RBI at Philadelphia's Connie Mack Stadium on October 1, 1970. His 10th-inning single scored Tim McCarver with the run that gave the Phillies the 2–1 win in the stadium's final game. The game was also overshadowed as unruly fans stormed the field during and after the game to claim bases, infield dirt, seats, and other various stadium items.

In 1976, Gamble helped the Yankees return to prominence as the "Bronx Bombers." The team won its first American League pennant in 12 seasons, hitting 17 home runs and 57 RBI. His left-handed power stroke was ideal for the renowned short right field fence at Yankee Stadium. Returning to the Yankees in 1979, he would settle into a limited role with the team, aiding the Yankees once again to an American League East division title in 1980 and a World Series appearance in 1981.

Gamble was nearly dealt along with Bob Watson and Mike Morgan from the Yankees back to the Texas Rangers for Al Oliver prior to the 1982 regular season, but he squashed the transaction because his contract had a list of eight teams to which he can be traded which did not include the Rangers.

Gamble had one of the more unusual batting stances in the major leagues. He stood at the plate in a deep crouch with his back almost parallel to the ground. Gamble claimed this stance helped him see the ball better as his eyes were right above the plate and close to where the ball was pitched. Gamble also finished with more career walks (610) than strikeouts (546). He was considered a below-average fielder, and consequently played over a third of his games as a designated hitter, but he had a good arm. He played in the 2007 Yankee Old Timers Game with many Yankee players that were honored from the 1977 championship team.

== Personal life ==
Gamble lived in Little Ferry, New Jersey, while playing with the Yankees. Baseball-Reference.com ranks Gamble's mustache as the fifth-best in history.

After retirement from baseball, Gamble returned to Alabama and lived in Montgomery where he was a player agent for several years. He was involved in youth baseball and later in his life he often came back to New York to give free baseball clinics for the St. Kevin Youth Guild in Queens, New York. He was married to his first wife Juanita while playing for the Yankees and, after retirement and divorce, he married his second wife, Lovell Woods Gamble. His son, Sean, was a player in the Philadelphia Phillies organization, while another son, Shane, played in junior college. He also has three daughters, Sheena Maureen, Kalani Lee, and Kylah Lee.

== Death ==
Gamble died of cancer in his jaw (known as ameloblastic carcinoma) on January 31, 2018, at the age of 68.
