= Jirina Knobloch =

Psychiatrist

- Born: 5 April 1918; Prague, Austria-Hungary
- Died: 20 December 2015 (aged 97); Vancouver, British Columbia
- Spouse: Ferdinand Knobloch

Academic work
- Discipline: Psychiatry
- Institutions: University of British Columbia

Jiřina Knoblochová (5 April 1918 – 20 December 2015), known as Jirina Knobloch in English, was a Czech-Canadian psychiatrist. Having lived in Vancouver since 1970, she was Professor Emeritus at the University of British Columbia. She collaborated extensively with her husband Ferdinand Knobloch. The pair was described by the Czech Ministry of Foreign Affairs as "the most prominent figures in post-war Czech psychiatry".

== Biography ==
Due to the Nazi occupation of Czechoslovakia and the subsequent closing of Czech universities, Knobloch was unable to finish her medical studies. During World War II, she worked as a nurse in Slovakia. There she took part in the Slovak National Uprising for which she was decorated twice with the Order of the Slovak National Uprising. Afterwards, she studied surgery under Jirásek in Prague. In 1947 she joined her husband Ferdinand Knobloch in his psychiatric clinic. She soon became a leading expert on children and family psychotherapy. In 1967, they jointly published a book entitled Forensic Psychiatry which won the Prize of the Czechoslovak Medical Society in 1968.

In 1970 she and her husband travelled to the United States along with their two daughters. They worked on developing an integrated system of psychotherapy. More than 200 of their specialist publications and papers were synthesized in their book titled Integrated Psychotherapy which was published in 1993.

In 2004, Jiřina and Ferdinand Knobloch became the recipients of the Gratias Agit Award presented by the Czech Ministry of Foreign Affairs. A journal article published by the Ministry described the pair as "the most prominent figures in post-war Czech psychiatry".
