= Jacquie Jones =

American public television film director, producer, writer and media executive

- Born: April 28, 1965; Washington, D.C.
- Died: January 28, 2018 (aged 52); Washington, D.C.
- Education: Howard University; Stanford University
- Occupations: Media executive; director; producer; writer
- Notable work: Africans in America, Matters of Race and 180 Days: A Year Inside an American High School
- Spouse: Grant Clark
- Children: Ayana Jones Clark

Jacquie Jones (April 28, 1965 – January 28, 2018) was an American public television film director, producer, writer and media executive. She was an editor of the Black Film Review from 1989 to 1993. She was executive director of Black Public Media (formerly the National Black Programming Consortium) from 2005 to 2014.

Jones founded the New Media Institute in 2006 and the Public Media Corps in 2009. She was the recipient of two Peabody Awards, a Gracie Award and was selected as a Revson Fellow at Columbia University.

Jones lived in Durban, South Africa. She was visiting Washington, D.C., with her family in December 2017 when she became ill. Jones died January 28, 2018.

== Early life and education ==
Jacqueline Michele Jones was born April 28, 1965, in Washington D.C. Her parents were Humphrey and Claire Antoine Jones. Her family later moved to Memphis, Tennessee. Jones attended Howard University, majoring in English and minoring in African American Studies. She obtained her BA in English in 1987. Jones was editor of the Black Film Review from 1989 until 1993. She later attended Stanford University, earning a MA in documentary filmmaking in 1995.

== Career ==
Jones' was hired as a producer for Public Broadcasting Station, WGBH, in Boston after her graduation from Stanford University. In 1999 she was hired as senior vice president of ROJA productions. She worked at ROJA until 2003. While working for ROJA, Jones was responsible for creating new installations for the National Civil Rights Museum in Memphis, Tennessee.

From 2005 to 2014, Jones served as executive director of the National Black Programming Consortium (now called Black Public Media). This nonprofit organization's primary focus is to develop media content about the Black experience. "As executive director of the media arts organization, Jones expanded the focus of the nonprofit from public television to include digital media and she founded the New Media Institute that went on to train more than 500 media professionals in the tools needed to navigate the digital world.".

Jones founded the New Media Institute in 2006. She also established Public Media Corps in 2009, "which connected minority and low-income communities with broadband public media resources and social media tools."

Jones published writings in various anthologies and periodicals, including the anthologies Black Popular Culture and Picturing Us: African American Identity in Photography.

== Film and television ==
Year	Film	Role	Notes
2017	Sighted Eyes/Feeling Heart	Executive producer	
2015	180 Days: Hartsville	Producer, director	
2015	Independent Lens	Executive producer	TV series (8 episodes: 2007-2015)
2015	180 Days: A Year Inside an American High School	Producer, director	Peabody Award (2 episodes)
2013	Black Folks Don't	Executive producer	TV series (10 episodes: 2013-2016)
2004	Secret of Eel Island	Writer	1 Episode
2003	Matters of Race	Senior Producer	
1999	The 20th Century: From Behind Closed Doors	Producer, writer	
1998	Africans in America: America's Journey Through Slavery	Senior Producer, Director	Peabody Award

== Awards ==
- Peabody Award (1998) WGBH-TV Boston. Africans in America: America’s Journey Through Slavery (PBS)
- Peabody Award (2013) National Black Programming Consortium. 180 Days: A Year Inside An American High School (PBS)
- Gracie Award (2013) National Black Programming Consortium. 180 Days: A Year Inside An American High School (PBS)
