= John Elder (footballer) =

Australian rules footballer (1932–2018)

Personal information
- Full name: John William Elder
- Born: 8 July 1932
- Died: 13 January 2018 (aged 85)
- Original team: Wycheproof
- Height: 179 cm (5 ft 10 in)
- Weight: 80 kg (176 lb)

Playing career^{1}
| Years | Club | Games (Goals) |
| 1955 | Collingwood | 2 (0) |
| 1956–1957 | South Melbourne | 17 (0) |
| Total | | 19 (0) |
- ^{1} Playing statistics correct to the end of 1957.

John William Elder (8 July 1932 – 13 January 2018) was an Australian rules footballer who played for the Collingwood Football Club and South Melbourne Football Club in the Victorian Football League (VFL).
