= Walter Buckpesch =

German politician (1924–2018)

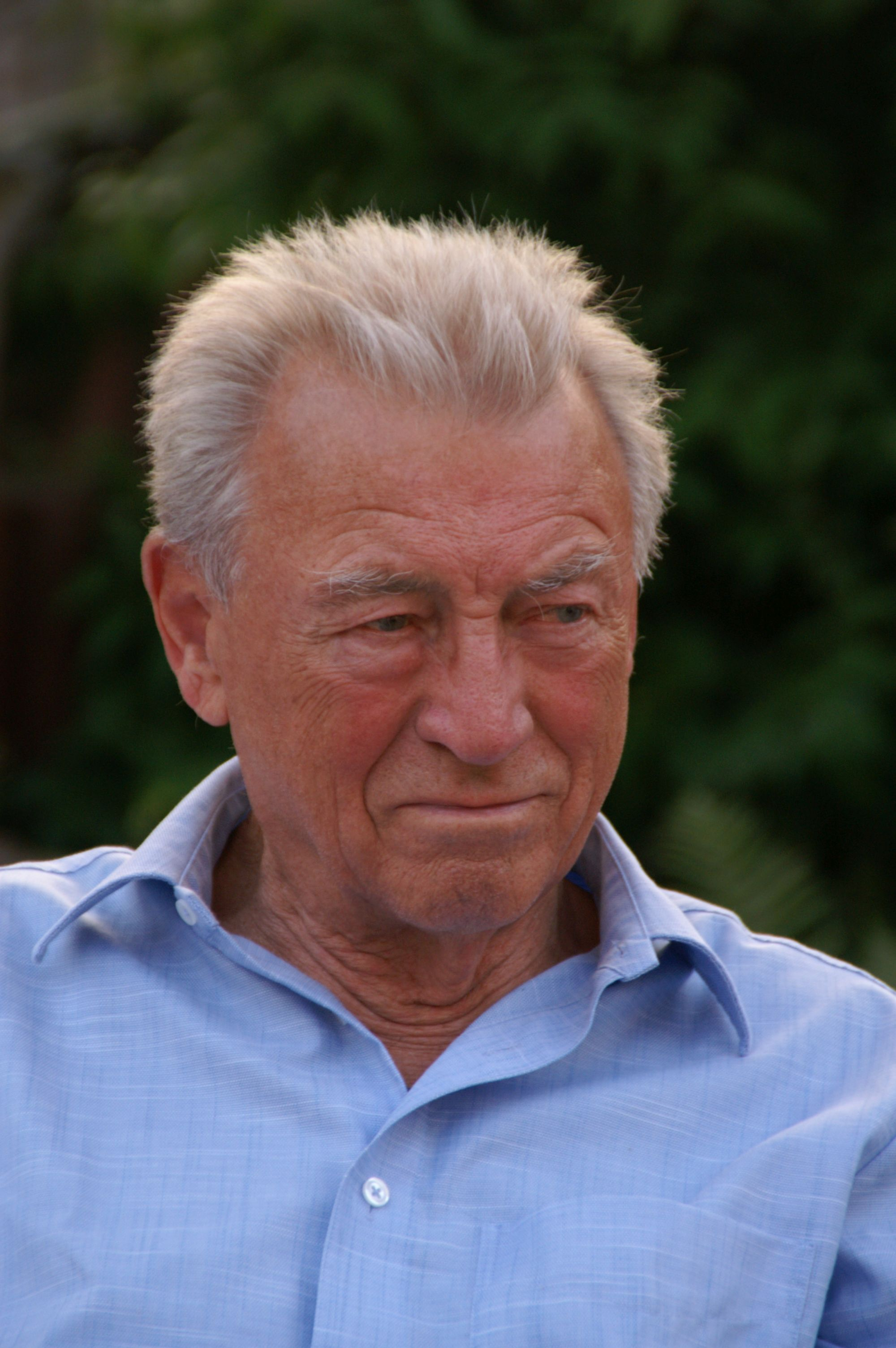
Portrait of Walter Buckpesch

Walter Buckpesch (22 May 1924 – 25 January 2018) was a German politician.

Born in 1924, Buckpesch was raised in Offenbach am Main. He served in the Wehrmacht for a time, but deserted before the end of World War II. He worked as a machinist and vocational schoolteacher before his appointment as Offenbach's director of education and sports. First elected to the Offenbach city council in 1956, he assumed the mayoralty in 1974 and served until 1980. Buckpesch was elected to the Bundestag for one term between 1983 and 1987. He died in Offenbach at the age of 93.
