= Lutho Tapela =

Zimbabwean politician

Lutho Addington Tapela was the Zimbabwe Deputy Minister of Higher and Tertiary Education. He was the Senator for Bulilima-Mangwe (MDC-M). He died 19 January 2018.
