= Archie Styles (footballer, born 1939) =

English footballer and manager

Personal information
- Full name: Arthur Styles
- Date of birth: 29 October 1939
- Place of birth: Smethwick, Staffordshire, England
- Date of death: 9 January 2018 (aged 78)
- Position: Wing half

Youth career
- 1956: West Bromwich Albion

Senior career*
Years	Team	Apps	(Gls)
1956–1960	West Bromwich Albion	1	(0)
1960–1961	Wrexham	16	(0)
- Hereford United
- Kidderminster Harriers
- Stourbridge

Managerial career
- 1969–1972: Stourbridge
- * Club domestic league appearances and goals as of 03:16, 13 March 2018 (UTC)

Arthur "Archie" Styles (29 October 1939 – 9 January 2018) was an English footballer and football manager, who played as a wing half.

== Playing career ==
Styles was signed to the West Bromwich Albion youth team in 1956, turning professional in the same year, however he would only make one league appearance for the Baggies.

In 1960 he would sign for Wrexham, spending one season with the Welsh club.

The remainder of his career would be spent in non-league football, with spells at Hereford United, Kidderminster Harriers and Stourbridge.

== Managerial career ==
Styles would become the manager of Stourbridge in the 1969/70 season, replacing Terry Morrall. During Styles' time in charge he would make it to the quarter-finals of the FA Cup.
