= Serigne Sidi Moukhtar Mbacké =

Senegalese religious leader (1924–2018)

Cheikh Sidy Mokhtar Mbacké

Caliph of the Mouride Brotherhood
- In office 1 July 2010 – 9 January 2018
- Preceded by: Serigne Mouhamadou Lamine Bara Mbacké
- Succeeded by: Serigne Mountakha Mbacké

Personal details
- Born: 11 July 1924; Mbacké Kadior, Senegal
- Died: 9 January 2018 (aged 93); Touba, Senegal

Serigne Sidi Moukhtar Mbacké (11 July 1924 – 9 January 2018), also spelled Serigne Sidy Muqtar Mbacke and Cheikh Sidy Mokhtar Mbacké, was a Senegalese religious leader. He was the caliph of the Mouride movement, a large Sufi order based in Senegal, from 1 July 2010 until his death on 9 January 2018.

== Life ==
Serigne Sidi Moukhtar Mbacké was the son of Sheikh Mouhamadou Lamine Bara Mbacke (1891-1936), who was the third son of Amadou Bamba.

Mokhtar Mbacké became Caliph on 1 July 2010, following the death of his predecessor, Serigne Mouhamadou Lamine Bara Mbacké. Mbacké was already 85 years old at the time.

Mokhtar Mbacké died on 9 January 2018 at the age of 93. He had been in declining health for several months. He was buried in the village of Gouye Mbind.
