= Public Media Corps =

American public service initiative

The Public Media Corps is a national public service initiative started by The National Black Programming Consortium, a national public media organization, in 2011. This initiative was started to bridge the digital divide in disadvantaged communities, with a particular focus on urban and rural areas.

Taking inspiration from programs like Teach For America, AmeriCorps, and the Peace Corps, the central idea is to bring news media and digital creatives into underserved communities to provide help encourage more digital participation and digital citizens.
