= Jim Sypult =

American football player and coach (1945–2018)

Biographical details
- Born: September 21, 1945
- Died: January 8, 2018 (aged 72); Peru

Playing career
- 1963–1966: West Virginia
- Positions: Free safety, Wide receiver

Coaching career (HC unless noted)
- 1967: West Virginia (GA)
- 1973: Fairmont (co-DC)
- 1974–1978: Middle Tennessee (DC)
- 1979–1991: Davidson (DC)
- 1992–2010: Methodist

Head coaching record
- Overall: 88–101

Accomplishments and honors

Championships
- 1 USA South Athletic (2005)

Jim Sypult (September 21, 1945 - January 8, 2018) was an American football player and coach. He served as the head football coach at Methodist University in Fayetteville, North Carolina from 1992 to 2010, compiling a record of 88–101. Sypult was the second coach in the program's history and won the team's first conference championship, in 2005.

== Head coaching record ==
Year	Team	Overall	Conference	Standing	Bowl/playoffs
Methodist Monarchs (NCAA Division III independent) (1992–1997)
1992	Methodist	0–10			
1993	Methodist	4–6			
1994	Methodist	5–5			
1995	Methodist	5–5			
1996	Methodist	6–4			
1997	Methodist	9–1			
Methodist Monarchs (Atlantic Central Football Conference) (1998–2000)
1998	Methodist	7–3	3–1	2nd	
1999	Methodist	3–7	2–4	T–4th	
2000	Methodist	7–3	4–2	T–2nd	
Methodist Monarchs (USA South Athletic Conference) (2001–2010)
2001	Methodist	5–5	3–3		
2002	Methodist	3–7	2–4		
2003	Methodist	4–5	3–3		
2004	Methodist	7–3	4–2		
2005	Methodist	8–2	6–1	T–1st	
2006	Methodist	4–6	2–5	T–5th	
2007	Methodist	5–6	4–3	T–3rd	
2008	Methodist	2–8	1–6	7th	
2009	Methodist	3–7	2–5	7th	
2010	Methodist	2–8	1–6	T–7th	
Methodist:		88–101	37–45		
Total:		88–101			
National championship Conference title Conference division title or championship game berth
