= Jack Law (footballer) =

Australian rules footballer (1924–2018)

Personal information
- Full name: Reginald John Law
- Born: 18 July 1924
- Died: 26 January 2018 (aged 93)
- Original team: Yarraville
- Height: 168 cm (5 ft 6 in)
- Weight: 67 kg (148 lb)

Playing career^{1}
Years	Club	Games (Goals)
1943–1944	Footscray	6 (3)
- ^{1} Playing statistics correct to the end of 1944.

Reginald John Law (18 July 1924 – 26 January 2018) was an Australian rules footballer who played for the Footscray Football Club in the Victorian Football League (VFL).
