= Małgorzata Bocheńska =

Polish journalist (1949–2018)

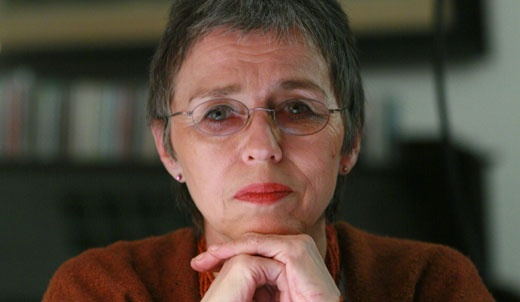
Małgorzata Bocheńska in 2009

Malgorzata Bochenska (née Gąsiorowska; 10 September 1949 – 2 January 2018) was a Polish journalist, culture animator and publicist.

== Career ==
Born in Warsaw, Bocheńska graduated from the University of Warsaw in 1976 with a master's degree in Polish. From 1974 to 1981 she worked with Polish National TV Theater as an editor. From 1984 to 1989, she worked with democratic opposition circles and the Helsinki Committee. In 1984 she established “Salon 101” a place where political, scientific, and artistic elites could meet. The place gathered various scattered people struggling to gain the independence of Poland.

In 1986, she created the independent film group “Index”, producing documentary films in Europe and South America for Polish immigrants as well as the “Freedom House” Foundation. As a film reporter, she recorded important political and social events. These included “Solidarity”, NZS, Lech Wałęsa, and Citizen's Committees. From 1990 to 1992, she was editor in chief of the national TV social and political department, where she authored the following programs: “The Record”, “Journalist Disclose”, and “Countries, Nations, Occurrences”. Between 1993 and 1995, she anchored her program ‘Studio Kontakt' for TVP Polonia that promoted Polish culture. She was program advisor for Polsat TV since 1995. She inaugurated “ The Day of Good News’ action on 8 September 2001.

She was a member of the "Polish Union of Journalist", "Cultural Association Beit Warsaw", and the "Free Word Association". Bocheńska died in Warsaw on 2 January 2018, and is survived by four children.

== TV documentary film ==
- MISTRZ ŻYCIA, Directed by: Małgorzata Bocheńska, Grzegorz Dubowski

== Literary work ==
- Dar intuicji, Małgorzata Bocheńska, Grigorij Schwarz, Warszawa, 1994, OCLC 749580037.
- "Ruchomy Swiat", Małgorzata Bocheńska, Warszawa 2017

== Sources ==
- Marcin Źrałek, Opatrunek dla dusz.„Rzeczpospolita” 12-12-2007
- Marta Białek; SALON 101
- Agnieszka Jędrzejczak, Grzegorz Rzeczkowski: Rzeczpospolita salonowa; Przekrój – 16 lutego 2006
- Dzień Dobrej Wiadomości, Rzeczpospolia, 21.05.2004, BL
