= Catnic =

Welsh building and construction products manufacturer

Catnic is a Wales-based building and construction products manufacturer which developed and patented a steel lintel.

== History ==
Catnic was established in 1969 when Brian Robinson took his idea to entrepreneur Alfred Gooding. The company conceived, developed and pioneered the steel lintel designed for the house building industry, and soon won a major share of the UK market. The name 'Catnic' came from Brian's two children, Catherine and Nicholas.

In 1982, Catnic were involved in a landmark patent case, Catnic Components Ltd v Hill & Smith Ltd, which brought about a decision from the House of Lords

== Today ==
Having been sold to Corus Group, Catnic have developed other steel-based building products, including Qwikpost.

The Catnic range is sold throughout the UK by a network of builder's merchants, DIY outlets and garden centres. The market in Germany is serviced by Catnic GmbH, and in the rest of Europe, the Middle East and the Far East by a network of independent distributors.
