= Bhanu Gupta =

Bhanu Gupta ভানু গুপ্ত
- Born: 12 December 1930; Rangoon, Burma, British India
- Died: 27 January 2018 (aged 87) Mumbai, Maharashtra
- Genres: Hindi film scores
- Occupation: Musician
- Instruments: Guitar, harmonica
- Years active: 1959–2018

Bhanu Gupta was an Indian guitarist and harmonist who is mostly known for this contribution in the Indian film industry. He has been associated with multiple music directors, including R. D. Burman, one of the seminal music directors of Indian film.

== Early life ==
Bhanu Gupta was born in 1930 in Rangoon, Burma and learnt to play the harmonica from British sailors. As he could read and write Japanese, Bhanu at the age of 12, worked as an English interpreter in the Japanese army, at a monthly salary of ₹400. During these times he also witnessed the World War II at close quarters. He and his family worked closely with the Indian National Army and Subhas Chandra Bose. At 15, Gupta received a plastic harmonica as a gift and he learned to play it on his own. The first tune he learnt to play was the Indian National Anthem. In the 1940s his family moved to Kolkata, as the war in Burma was at its peak and lived in the Baidyabati area of Hooghly in West Bengal. While in Kolkata he studied oil technology and later worked with Caltex. Bhanu was an avid sportsman. He would swim across the Irrawaddy River, box and play cricket. At the age of 18, he started playing First Division Cricket in Calcutta League and played with the likes of Bapu Nadkarni, Pankaj Roy, and the West Indian pace bowler Roy Gilchrist. His name is still mentioned in the Kalighat club in Kolkata as one of their prolific players.

== Career ==
While in Kolkata, Bhanu used to perform playing the harmonica in nightclubs and cabarets frequently. During that time, Bhanu had to decide whether to be a sportsman or a musician. But since there was no career path for a sportsman in those days, he chose to be a musician. In 1959 after living in Kolkata for nine years, Bhanu quit his job and set off for Mumbai with Rs 600 to make it big as a harmonica player much against the wishes of his family. His first break came with the film Paigham from music director C Ramchandra. Soon he started playing for Bipin Dutta and later with Salil Chowdhury and came to be popularly known as the Hindu harmonica player because most of the harmonists in those days were Christian. During one of his recordings for Salil Chowdhury, he chanced upon an old Edusonia guitar (made by Braganzas of Free School Street, Kolkata), lying in the state of neglect, fixed it and started to practice on it. During these days he used to live next door to music director duo Sonik Omi where the popular Madan Mohan would frequent. During one such visit Madan Mohan was impressed with Bhanu, having heard him practise. The former picked Bhanu to play for him in 1963. Around that time the legendary music director R. D. Burman was looking for a guitarist for a couple of songs. Bhanu Gupta was called in and this association with R. D. Burman continued up to the composer's death in 1994. Post 1994, he played for various music directors Anu Malik, Nadeem Shravan and Bappi Lahiri among others.

== Notable works ==
He played guitar in these and many more popular Rahul Dev Burman compositions.

- Dekhiye Sahibon – Teesri Manzil
- Suno Kaho – Aap Ki Kasam
- Chingari Koi Bhadke – Amar Prem
- Ek Main Aur Ek Tu – Khel Khel Mein
- Mehbooba Mehbooba – Sholay
- Ek Chatur Naar – Padosan
- Kya Yahi Pyaar Hai – Rocky
- Yaadon ki Baraat – Yaadon Ki Baraat
- Aisa Na Mujhe Tum Dekho – Darling Darling
- Tere Bina Zindagi – Aandhi
- Yeh Kori Karari – Samundar
- Kuch Na Kaho – 1942 A Love Story
- The Guitar Theme – Sholay
- Harmonica theme in Sholay where Amitabh Bachchan plays the harmonica as Jaya Bhaduri lights the lamp.

== Later years ==
Bhanu Gupta lived in Mumbai but had shifted to Kolkata to pursue a musical career. He moved back to Mumbai post his recovery from severe illness. He died on January 27, 2018, after battling health issues.
