= Pedro Pérez Fernández (economist) =

Spanish economist

Pedro Pérez Fernández (18 February 1949 – 24 January 2018) was a Spanish economist.

== Biography ==
His professional activity has been between the Academic world, the Public Administration, the International Organizations and the business activity.

He has been Professor of Economic Theory of the Faculty of Economic Sciences of the Universidad Complutense de Madrid, member of the National Council of Education, of the Board of Trustees of Carlos III University of Madrid, President of Social Council of the University of Málaga and member of the Board of Trustees of the Rey Juan Carlos I Center of the University of New York.

Between 1979 and 1993, he held the positions of General Technical Secretary of the Ministry of Economy, General Director of Planning, General Director of Economic Policy, Secretary General of Economy and Planning, Secretary General of Commerce and, from 1988 to 1993, was Secretary of State for the Economy.

Simultaneously with some of the aforementioned positions, he has been President of the Superior Price Board, President of the Spanish Institute of Foreign Trade (ICEX) and Chairman of the Superior Banking Council.

In 1984 he was elected executive director of the International Monetary Fund.

Member of the Board of Directors of Tabacalera from 1979 to 1983, he was President of the company from 1993 to 1996 and President of Bankers Trust Spain from 1996 to 1998.

He has been a member of the Board of Directors of INEM, INSS, INSERSO, FORPPA, IRYDA, National Institute of Industry, National Hydrocarbons Institute, Mercasa, Aceriales, Iberia, Banco Exterior de España, Official Credit Institute, Civic Banking, Testa Inmuebles en Rent and General Secretary of Group 14 Real Estate for Excellence.

G-14 Inmobiliarias.

He has been a member of the Board of Trustees of the Prince of Asturias Foundation, of the Foundation for Help against Drug Addiction and of the Governing Council of the Association for the Progress of Management (APD).

He is President of Itínere Infraestucturas.
