= Tad Schnugg =

American Executive Director

- Born: April 17, 1944
- Died: January 13, 2018 (aged 73)
- Partner: George Faison
- Website: http://faisonfirehouse.org/

Tad Schnugg was the Executive Director and co-founder with George Faison of the American Performing Arts Collaborative, that is located in the Firehouse Theater. Tad Schnugg and George Faizon founded Faison Firehouse Theater in 2000. The theater seats 130, and is equipped with performing arts and cultural center media services, with fine arts gallery, rehearsal facilities and a cabaret theater. The 130-seat theater, branded “Hollywood of Harlem” by the media, is a full service performing arts and cultural center with fine arts galleries, rehearsal facilities and a cabaret theater. He died on January 13, 2018. His funeral was held at. Bill Cosby gave the eulogy. He studied theater and literature at LMU Munich and the Free University of Berlin.

It is located in Harlem, New York City. He worked for the Alvin Ailey's dance theater as an assistant to the General Manager in 1963. He worked in the capacity as a producing director, company manager, technical director and lighting designer. He was the administrative director, producer and co-founder of George Faison Universal Dance Experience for 20 years. Producing theatrical and corporate events in the United States and in Europe.

== Early life ==
Tad Schnugg's career started in 1968, working with the Alvin Ailey Dance Theater. He was an assistant to the general manager of the Alvin Ailey Dance Theater Ivy Clarke.

== Career ==
As a producer and co-producer he produced “American Jam Session” and “Star Show” in France. In 1971 Schnugg and Faison co-founded the Universal Dance Experience. In 1989, he co-produced for an NBC TV special "Cosby Salutes Ailey". In 1997, he co-founded with George Faison the American Performing Arts Collaborative, a non-profit organization that trains young people.

In 1997 the American Performing Arts Collaboration was incorporated. It was created by Tad Schnugg and George Faison. APAC is a non-profit that develops, encourages, and supports artist development. It presents readings, dance, music, cabaret, and mentorship and provides space for theatrical performances for emerging artists.

While at the Faison Firehouse Theater he produced entertainment and theater productions. He produced and co-produced "American Jam Session" and "Star Show", performed in Monte Carlo and Deauville, France. He produced major events for Peugeot Automobiles, Bull Computers, Ford Europe and BMW in France and Belgium.

He produced, in collaboration with George Faison, 'The Wiz in Central Park', The Respect Project, which is an arts outreach and youth theatre project. He was working on an upcoming musical about the life of Whitney Houston: The Last Interview. Tad was a friend of Maya Angelou, and bequeathed gifts in her will to Tad and five other New Yorkers.

In attendance at Tad Schnugg's funeral and celebrating his life were many notables whom he had worked with during his career in theater, Oprah Winfrey, Leslie Uggams, Stephanie Mills, Phylicia Rashad, Bill Cosby, and Al Sharpton.
