= Ruth Kaarlela =

American university professor and social worker (1919–2018)

- Born: September 22, 1919; Keweenaw Bay, Michigan
- Died: January 8, 2018; Michigan
- Occupation(s): Professor, social worker, gerontologist, expert on vision rehabilitation
- Known for: Professor at Western Michigan University, 1963-1986

Ruth Kaarlela (September 22, 1919 – January 8, 2018) was an American university professor and social worker. Her work was in the fields of blindness, gerontology, and vision rehabilitation therapy.

== Early life ==
Kaarlela was born and raised in Keweenaw Bay, Michigan, the eleventh of twelve children born to Robert Kaarlela and Mary Kaarlela. When she was a child, she wrote poems published in the Detroit Free Press. She attended Baraga High School, and earned her undergraduate and master's level degrees in social work at Wayne State University. She completed doctoral work in gerontology at the University of Michigan. She also held a teaching certificate in special education.

== Career ==
Kaarlela had a variety of jobs as a young woman. At age 20, she was a live-in servant in Detroit, Michigan. She was program chair for the Ingham County Council of Social Welfare in 1949 and 1950. In 1953, she worked with the National Foundation of Infantile Paralysis, speaking to community groups on the possibilities of a polio vaccine. She worked at the Industrial Home for the Blind in Mineola, New York for three years, and as a mobile teacher for blind children on Long Island. She was supervisor of a day school for emotionally disabled children in Nassau County.

From 1963 to 1986, Kaarlela was a professor at Western Michigan University, specializing in vision rehabilitation. She was chair of the Department of Blindness and Vision Studies from 1980 to 1986. She taught the school's first course in gerontology, and helped to establish the gerontology degree program. She was chair of the Association of University Educators in Rehabilitation Teaching and Orientation and Mobility and other bodies at the state and national level. In retirement she worked with the American Foundation for the Blind, in a community health program serving Native Americans.

In 2001, Kaarlela received the Migel Medal from the American Foundation for the Blind. She was inducted into the American Printing House for the Blind's Hall of Fame in 2002.

== Personal life ==
In retirement, Kaarlela traveled, lived with her widowed sister Edith, and was active in the Finnish Cultural Center and the Finnish American Historical Society. She died in 2018, aged 98 years.
