= Leon Hill =

Australian cricketer (1936–2018)

Personal information
- Full name: Leon Trevor Hill
- Born: 28 February 1936; West Croydon, South Australia, Australia
- Died: 22 January 2018 (aged 81); Prahran, Victoria, Australia
- Batting: Right-handed
- Bowling: Right-arm off-spin

Domestic team information
- Years: Team
- 1958–59 to 1960–61: South Australia
- 1962–63: Queensland

Career statistics
Competition	First-class
Matches	17
Runs scored	584
Batting average	18.83
100s/50s	1/1
Top score	100
Balls bowled	968
Wickets	8
Bowling average	51.50
5 wickets in innings	0
10 wickets in match	0
Best bowling	2/47
Catches/stumpings	9/0
- Source: Cricinfo, 29 August 2018

Leon Trevor Hill (28 February 1936 – 22 January 2018) was a cricketer who played first-class cricket for South Australia and Queensland from 1958 to 1963.

A number-three batsman and off-spin bowler, Leon Hill began the 1959–60 Sheffield Shield season with a century for South Australia – 100 out of a second innings total of 200 – against Victoria. Later that season he scored 83 (the side’s top score) and 29 against Queensland. He lost form after that season and moved to Queensland, where he played two first-class matches, then to Victoria.

He and his wife Val had a son and a daughter.
