= Noël Estcourt =

Rhodesian sportsman (1929–2018)

Personal information
- Full name: Noël Sidney Dudley Estcourt
- Born: 7 January 1929; Ralolia, Southern Rhodesia
- Died: 7 January 2018 (aged 89)
- Batting: Right-handed
- Bowling: Right-arm off-break
- Role: All-rounder

Domestic team information
- Years: Team
- 1953–1954: Cambridge University

Career statistics
Competition	First-class
Matches	21
Runs scored	513
Batting average	19.00
100s/50s	0/2
Top score	56*
Balls bowled	2,267
Wickets	23
Bowling average	54.86
5 wickets in innings	0
10 wickets in match	0
Best bowling	4/79
Catches/stumpings	6/–
- Source: CricketArchive, 16 November 2022

Noël Sidney Dudley Estcourt (7 January 1929 – 7 January 2018) was a Rhodesian sportsman who played international rugby union for England and first-class cricket.

Estcourt was born in Southern Rhodesia but educated in South Africa. When he moved to England, it was to further his studies at Cambridge University.

He played two first-class seasons with the Cambridge University Cricket Club, in 1953 and 1954. In the first of those years he played just six matches but was used considerably more in 1954, appearing in 15 matches. He scored both of his half-centuries in 1954, to go with his 19 wickets.

Estcourt was also a good enough rugby union player at university and for Blackheath, that he was capped once for England in the 1955 Five Nations Championship. He was England's fullback in their final fixture, against Scotland at Twickenham. England were victors by three points, a victory that ensured they didn't register a winless campaign.

He died on his 89th birthday, 7 January 2018.
