= Serigne Saliou Mbacké =

Senegalese sufi leader (1915–2007)

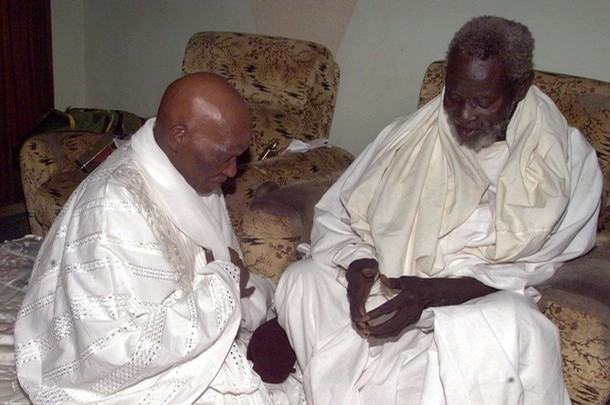
- Mbacké (right) meeting with Senegalese president Abdoulaye Wade

Caliph of the Mouride Brotherhood
- In office 1990 – December 28, 2007
- Preceded by: Serigne Abdou Khadr Mbacké
- Succeeded by: Serigne Mouhamadou Lamine Bara Mbacké

Personal details
- Born: September 22, 1915 Senegal
- Died: December 28, 2007 (aged 91–92) Touba, Senegal
- Occupation: Grand Marabout of the Mouride movement

Serigne Saliou Mbacké (Wolof: Sëriñ Saaliwu Mbàkke; September 22, 1915 – December 28, 2007) was a saint (Wali) and Grand Marabout (leader) of the Mouride movement in Senegal from 1990 until his death in 2007.

Sheikh Salih Mbacké was the fifth caliph (leader) of Mouridism and the last surviving son of Cheikh Ahmadou Bamba, the founder of the Mouride movement.

== Life ==
As Sheikh, he was credited for his transformation of the village of Touba into Senegal's second largest city.

Mbacké was a pious leader who served as the leading example for the millions of followers (talibés) of the Mouride Islamic movement and made many improvements to the more than 400 Islamic schools founded by himself and his siblings, most notably Serigne Mourtalla Mbacke. He also made many improvements to the holy city of Touba, such as covering the Grand Mosque of Touba with Italian marble.

Agriculture and religious education were his main occupations. The Daaras (religious schools he founded), where the students work in the field, are throughout Senegal. With the majority being found in Khelcom in the center of the country near Kaolack.

He died at the age of 92 on December 28, 2007, and was buried in Touba the next day; a three-day mourning period was declared in Senegal, his home country. He was succeeded by his nephew, Serigne Mouhamadou Lamine Bara Mbacké, the son of Cheikh Fallou Macke.
