= Hélder d'Oliveira =

Portuguese sailor (1934–2018)

Personal information
- Nationality: Portuguese
- Born: 21 August 1934 Lisbon, Portugal
- Died: 13 January 2018 (aged 83)

Sport
- Sport: Sailing

Hélder d'Oliveira (21 August 1934 – 13 January 2018) was a Portuguese sailor. He was portuguese national champion four times (1955, 1956, 1957 and 1959) in Snipe and seven times (1956, 1958, 1959, 1960, 1961, 1962 and 1963) in Finn. He competed at the 1960 Summer Olympics and the 1964 Summer Olympics in Finn.
