= Discorporation =

Discorporation may refer to:

- Head transplant
- Incorporeality
