= Ferdinand Knobloch =

Czech-Canadian psychiatrist (1916–2018)

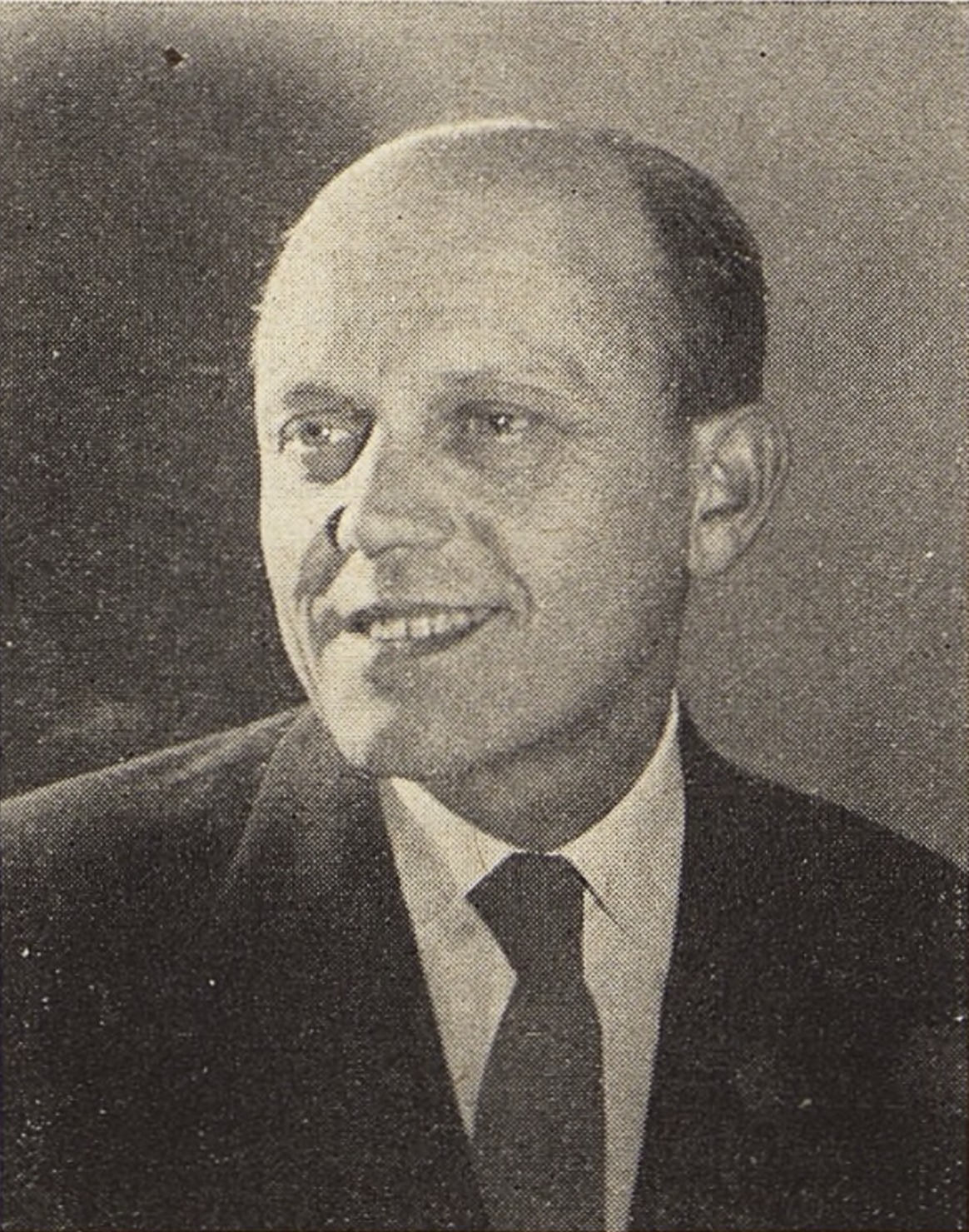
Image of Ferdinand Knobloch

Ferdinand Knobloch CSc.[Cz], F. R. C. P. (15 August 1916 – 19 January 2018) was a Czech-Canadian psychiatrist and professor emeritus of the University of British Columbia. Knobloch was born in Prague in August 1916. He spent two years in the Flossenbürg concentration camp, and his first wife Zuzana was murdered in Auschwitz. He established, with his second wife, Jirina Knobloch, a type of psychotherapy called integrated (or integrative) psychotherapy (sometimes referred to as "integrated/integrative/group schema psychotherapy"). He turned 100 in August 2016 and died in January 2018 at the age of 101.

== Biography ==
Knobloch was Professor Emeritus of Psychiatry at the University of British Columbia, Vancouver. He was one of the pioneers of family therapy and the therapeutic community, and psycho-drama in Europe. He created the theory of Integrated Psychotherapy, and its original techniques, such as the technique of group schema, psycho-gymnastics or psycho-mime, have been applied in three facilities in Czechoslovakia and two in Canada.

He was the co-author (with Jirina Knobloch) of Integrated Psychotherapy, and authored over 250 publications, including eight books on psychotherapy, forensic psychiatry, the psychology of music and the philosophy of science.

Knobloch also served as the Chair of the Psychotherapeutic Section of the World Psychiatric Association between 1993 and 1996 and as the Chair of the Canadian Society for Integrated Psychotherapy and Psychoanalysis (a Member of the International Federation of Psychoanalytic Societies). He was the Honorary Director of the Moreno Institute in Beacon, New York.
