= Jan Ramberg =

Jan Åke Ramberg (1 February 1932 – 28 January 2018) was a Swedish lawyer and professor emeritus specialising in commercial law, and national and international arbitration court judge. Ramberg was also a member of the International Arbitration Court of London.

Jan Ramberg graduated in 1955 from Uppsala University, and obtained his LL.D. from Stockholm University in 1970. From 1970 to 1997 he worked as a civil law professor, and from 1994 to 1996, he was the Dean of the Faculty of Law. Ramberg was also a practising lawyer and partner in the law office of Johan Ramberg (later Vinge & Ramberg, today Vinge) in Gothenburg and worked on the Boards of several corporations, such as Svenska Handelsbanken. From 1980 to 1985, he was the chairman and Director of Transecure S.A. Luxemburg. As Vice President of the International Chamber of Commerce's Commission on International Commercial Practice and Chairman of a work group which in 1980, 1990, and 2000 prepared Incoterm document revisions, he was involved in international trade law and practices development for more than three decades. Ramberg was the author of many academic books and articles on contract law, maritime law, transport law and Incoterms, published in English, German and Swedish.

Ramberg actively worked in the sphere of maritime law, having been the president of the Maritime Law Association of Sweden, a member of the editorial board of Lloyd's Maritime and Commercial Law Quarterly, president of the board of the Scandinavian Institute of Maritime Law, as well as the honorary vice-president of the Comité Maritime International.

== Selected bibliography ==
- PEPPER III Report: Promotion of Employee Participation in the Profits and Enterprise Results in the New Member and Candidate Countries of the European Union, Country Report Latvia (Inter-University Centre Split/Berlin, 2006).
- "Unsafe Ports and Berths", Oslo 1967
- "Cancellation of Contracts of Affreightment on Account of War and Similar Circumstances", Gothenburg Maritime Law Association publication No. 40, 1969
- "The Law of Carriage of Goods - Attempts at Harmonisation", Scandinavian Studies in Law, 1973, Stockholm
- Contributions to the UNCTAD/SIDA publication on "Ocean Chartering" (following a seminar in 1977 under Professor Ramberg's tutorship)
- "The Vanishing Bill of Lading & the 'Hamburg Rules Carrier'", American Journal of Comparative Law, volume XXVII, pp. 391–406
- "Die Incoterms Heute und Morgen" (with Dr.jur., Dr.h.c. F. Eisemann), GOF-Verlag, Vienna 1980
- "The China Papers" - a series of lectures in maritime law conducted in the People's Republic of China, Stockholm 1981
- "Incoterms 1980." (The Transnational Law of International Commercial Transactions) Norbert Horn & Clive Schmitthoff editors, pp. 137–151, Deventer, 1982
- "The Multimodal Transport Document" [International Carriage of Goods: Some Legal Problems and Possible Solutions] C.M. Schmitthoff and R.M. Goode editors, London 1988
- "Incoterms in the Era of Electronic Data Interchange", Forum Internationale no. 13, November 1988
- "The Law of Freight Forwarding and the 1992 FIATA Multimodal Transport Bill of Lading", (ed. by FIATA), Zürich, 1993
- "Guide to Incoterms", Paris 1991
- "Freedom of Contract in Maritime Law" LMCLQ pp. 178–191, 1993
- "The Unctad/ICC Rules on Multimodal Transport Documents - Genesis and Contents", (essays in honour of Hugo Tiberg), Stockholm 1996
- "Breach of Contract and Recoverable Losses" (Making Commercial Law, Essays in Honour of Roy Goode pp. 191–200), Oxford 1997
- "The New Swedish Sales Law" (Centro di studi e ricerche di diritto comparato e straniero, Saggi, Conferenze e Seminari 28), Rome 1997
- "International Commercial Transactions", Stockholm 1998, 1999
