= Jan Erik Hansen =

Norwegian ice hockey player

Jan Erik Hansen (September 24, 1940 – January 28, 2018) was a Norwegian ice hockey player.

== Career ==
He played for the Norwegian National Ice Hockey Team, and participated in the Winter Olympics in 1964, where he placed tenth with the Norwegian team.
