= Ruth Alas =

Estonian management scientist

Ruth Alas

Ruth Alas (5 August 1960 in Türi, Soviet Union – 23 January 2018 in Tallinn, Estonia) was an Estonian management scientist. She was the head of the Department of Management of the Estonian Business School until her death. Alas wrote more than 100 articles and 23 textbooks in topics relating to management and business.

== Education ==
- Türi Secondary School (1978)
- Tallinn Polytechnical Institute (currently Tallinn Technical University), Faculty of Economics (1983)
- Tartu State University (currently University of Tartu), Faculty of Psychology (1987)
- Estonian Business School, International Business Management, Master's degree (1997)
- Bentley College (currently Bentley University), Faculty of Management, management training (1997)
- IESE Business School, University of Navarra (Instituto de Estudios Superiores de la Empresa, Universidad de Navarra), international complementary training (1999)
- Estonian Business School, Business Management, Doctoral degree (PhD) (2002)
- University of Tartu, Faculty of Economics, Doctoral degree (PhD) in the field of economics (2004)

== Career ==
Alas worked as a programmer and a consultant. From 1995 she was a lecturer at the Estonian Business School, where she became a member of the senate in 1997, and head of the Department of Management in 2003. She wrote about change management in organizations.

Alas published in the Journal of Business Ethics, the Journal of Change Management, the Journal of East European Management Studies, Human Resource Development International, the International Journal of Strategic Change Management, the Baltic Journal of Management, the Journal of Business Economics and Management, Engineering Economics, Cross Cultural Management, Women in Management Review, Chinese Management Study, the International Journal of Chinese Culture and Management, Social Science Research Network, and others.
