= Maxwell Valentine Noronha =

Indian Roman Catholic bishop

Maxwell Valentine Noronha (14 February 1926 – 28 January 2018) was a Roman Catholic bishop.

Noronha was ordained to the priesthood in 1950. He served as bishop of the Roman Catholic Diocese of Calicut, India from 1980 to 2002.
