= Alf Gooding =

Welsh entrepreneur (Died 2018)

Alfred Gooding OBE (died 29 January 2018) was a Welsh entrepreneur. Over a fifty-year period, he founded companies in the construction and electronics sectors.

Gooding was born in Risca, South Wales, the son of a miner. In the 1950s he started Modern Building Wales Limited which built 7,000 houses across Wales. His most famous venture is Catnic, the company credited with developing the steel lintel for the building industry. In 1982, the company was involved in a House of Lords case, Catnic Components Ltd v Hill & Smith Ltd. Gooding sold it the following year, making a personal profit of £9 million. Another company, Race Electronics, was founded in the 1980s in partnership with Japanese business interests.

Gooding was appointed an Officer of the Order of the British Empire (OBE) in the 1981 Birthday Honours.

Gooding was chairman of CBI Wales. He was awarded with a fellowship from the University of Wales, Newport, in 2010.

In 2007, Gooding organised a bid to buy the troubled bank Northern Rock.

In 2014, the house in Rhiwderin, near Newport, where Gooding, then 82, lived with his wife Lavinia was destroyed by fire; the couple escaped unharmed.
