= A. Dean Jeffs =

American politician (1928–2018)

Member of the Utah Senate from the 15th district
- In office 1973–1982

Personal details
- Born: July 15, 1928 Provo, Utah, United States
- Died: January 21, 2018 (aged 89) Orem, Utah
- Party: Republican
- Spouse(s): Laurel Rae Johnson (d.1975); Darnell Z. Jeffs
- Profession: attorney

Alvin Dean Jeffs (July 15, 1928 – January 21, 2018), was an American politician who was a Republican member of the Utah State Senate who eventually served as majority whip in the Utah Senate. Jeffs was an attorney at the law firm of Jeffs & Jeffs, P.C. in Provo Utah, he was a veteran of the Korean War, serving in the Counter Intelligence Corp, and he was an alumnus of University of Utah and Brigham Young University. He was sworn into the Utah Bar in 1958.
