= Kudzai Chimbaira =

Swedish-Zimbabwean actor and director

- Born: 13 October 1985; Zimbabwe
- Died: January 2018 (aged 32)
- Occupations: Actor, director
- Awards: National Arts merit's awards. Zimbabwe International Film Festival, 2007

Kudzai Chimbaira (13 October 1985 – January 2018) was a Swedish-Zimbabwean actor and director.

She made her debut in 2005 in the short film Pamvura, and in 2007 she received an award at the Zimbabwe International Film Festival for best actress in a short film for playing the main character in the film The Return. The same year she also received a Zimbabwe's National Arts Merit Awards for her role in the play Anatol.

In 2008 she directed the play Silent Words for Harare International Festival of the Arts, and the same year she won an award for best actress in the Carthage Film Festival for her role in the film Zimbabwe. In 2008 she also moved to Sweden.

In Sweden she started the theater Integrationsteatern and was active in the Cinemafrica film festival, chairman of the diversity initiative Tryck, and acted in many plays, and the film Medan vi lever.

Chimbaira died in January 2018, 32 years old.
