= Gurcharan Singh Kalkat =

Indian agricultural scientist

- Born: 17 June 1926; Punjab, British India
- Died: 27 January 2018 (aged 91); Chandigarh, Punjab, India
- Occupation: Agricultural scientist
- Awards: Padma Shri; Padma Bhushan

Gurcharan Singh Kalkat (17 June 1926 – 27 January 2018) was an Indian agricultural scientist and the founder chairman of the Punjab State Farmers Commission (PSFC), known for his contributions in bringing the green revolution to Punjab. The Government of India awarded him the fourth highest Indian civilian honour of Padma Shri in 1981 and followed it up with the third highest Indian civilian award of Padma Bhushan in 2007.

== Biography ==
Gurcharan Singh was born on 17 June 1926 in the Indian state of Punjab. He graduated in agriculture from Punjab Agricultural College, Lyallpur in 1947 and secured a master's degree in agriculture from the University of Punjab in 1956. Receiving the Rockefeller Fellowship, he went to US and completed his doctoral studies at Ohio State University, Columbus, to obtain a PhD in agricultural entomology in 1958. Returning from US, he started his career as the deputy director of agriculture with the Government of Punjab in 1960 and became the director in 1971.

Two years later, he was shifted to the Indian Ministry of Agriculture in New Delhi as the Agricultural Commissioner, a post he held till 1978. After a stint in Washington, D.C., as senior agriculturist with the World Bank with the responsibility of attending to the agriculture development programmes in Ghana and Nigeria and subsequently in India and Nepal, he returned to India to take up the post of the vice chancellor of the Punjab Agricultural University, Ludhiana in 1998 and worked there till 2001. When the Government of Punjab established the Punjab State Farmers Commission in 2005, Kalkat was appointed its founder chairman.

Kalkat is known to have initiated the cooperation between Punjab Agricultural University and the farmers for fast dissemination of modern agricultural methods. He is also credited with initiatives for coordination between the local cooperatives and the Punjab State Cooperative Marketing Federation for smooth disbursal of farming credits and supply of materials. During his stint as the agricultural commissioner, he got the Indian Council of Agricultural Research and National Seeds Corporation involved in various state level agricultural programmes. He has also worked with Norman Borlaug when the Nobel Laureate was working on high yielding wheat varieties in the 1960s.

The Government of India awarded him the civilian honour of Padma Shri in 1981. Twenty six years later, he was again included in the 2007 Padma honours list for Padma Bhushan award.

== See also ==
- Norman Borlaug
