= Serigne Mouhamadou Lamine Bara Mbacké =

Senegalese Sufi leader (c. 1925–2010)

Caliph of the Mouride Brotherhood
- In office 29 December 2007 – 30 June 2010
- Preceded by: Serigne Saliou Mbacké
- Succeeded by: Cheikh Sidy Mokhtar Mbacké

Personal details
- Born: 1921 Senegal
- Died: 30 June 2010 (aged 84–85) Touba, Senegal
- Occupation: Grand Marabout of the Mouride movement

El Hadji Serigne Mouhamadou Lamine Bara Mbacké, or Sheikh Bara Mbacké (c. 1925 – 30 June 2010) was the Grand Marabout of the Mouride movement in Senegal from 2007 until his death in 2010. The movement is prominent outside Senegal as well, in places such as New York, Paris and Rome.

Bara Mbacké became Grand Marabout of the Mouride movement after the death of his uncle, Serigne Saliou Mbacké, on 28 December 2007. He died of natural causes at the age of 85. His death was mourned by millions of people, and Senegal declared an eight-day period of national mourning.

== Biography ==
Sheikh Bara Mbacké was the grandson of the founder of the Mouride. He was the sixth caliph of Mouridism. As the nephew of the fifth caliph Serigne Saliou Mbacké, he was the first caliph who was not a son of Sheikh Amadou Bamba, the founder of the Mouride movement.

Bara Mbacké succeeded Serigne Saliou Mbacke as Shaykh who was credited for his transformation of the village of Touba into Senegal's second largest city, and for the enormous growth in popular devotion and political power of the brotherhood both throughout West Africa and (through the diaspora) the world. It has been reported that Serigne Saliou Mbacke personally chose his successor, and that the grandsons of Amadou Bamba (including Serigne Saliou Mbacke's son, Serigne Cheikh Saliou Mbacké) have all pledged their loyalty to the new caliph, and that Bara Mbacké was visited by both President Abdoulaye Wade and Senegalese opposition leaders within 48 hours of his uncle's death.

Bara Mbacké was one of the sons of Mouhamadou Fallilou Mbacké, himself the second caliph and son of Sheikh Amadou Bamba. At 85 he was the oldest man to be appointed caliph of the Mouride. He was reported to have been trained by his father while caliph (1945–1968), and was said to speak a number of languages, including Arabic, French and English.

== Death ==
Bara Mbacké had been ill for months before his death in Touba on 30 June 2010. Just before his death he had been hospitalised at a clinic in the Senegalese capital, Dakar. Bara Mbacké's successor as Grand Marabout was his cousin, Cheikh Maty Leye Mbacke. President of Senegal Abdoulaye Wade took a helicopter ride from Dakar to Touba to swear allegiance to the new leader.

Senegalese Prime Minister Souleymane Ndéné Ndiaye announced his death on state radio that morning. His said Bara Mbacké's death was a "very great loss for all the nation", and praised his "erudite wisdom". President Wade, a Mouride himself, joined the people of Senegal in mourning events. Other officials, including the prime minister, Senate president and several government ministers joined him. Senegal entered an eight-day period of national mourning. Hundreds of thousands to even millions of people mourned his death. Traffic in Dakar was noticeably lighter as people went to Touba to mourn. Hymns and readings from the Koran, as well as images of mourning crowds were aired on state television. He was buried at Touba's main mosque.
