= Jim McNally (sport shooter) =

American sports shooter (1931–2018)

Personal information
- Born: 5 July 1931 Duluth, Minnesota, United States
- Died: 12 January 2018 (aged 86)

Sport
- Sport: Sports shooting

Jim McNally (5 July 1931 – 12 January 2018) was an American sports shooter. He competed at the 1968 Summer Olympics and the 1972 Summer Olympics.
