= Elizabeth Meehan (academic) =

Irish academic (1947–2018)

- Born: Elizabeth Marian Meehan; 23 March 1947; Edinburgh, Scotland
- Died: 6 January 2018 (aged 70)
- Occupation: Academic

Academic background
- Education: University of Sussex and Oxford University
- Alma mater: Oxford University

Academic work
- Discipline: Politics
- Sub-discipline: British-Irish Politics
- Institutions: University of Bath and Queen's University Belfast

Elizabeth Marian Meehan (23 March 1947 – 6 January 2018) was a distinguished academic and the first female professor of politics on the island of Ireland.

== Birth and education ==
Elizabeth Marian Meehan was born in Edinburgh, Scotland, on 23 March 1947, the eldest child of David Charles Meehan and Marian Byas, née Mackenzie. She attended Peebles High school for her secondary education. After completing secondary education, she enrolled in Edinburgh College of Art, but left to join the civil service in 1965. She spent eight years in the British Foreign Office before returning to higher education.

She graduated with first class honour in politics from the University of Sussex in 1976 and a D Phil from Oxford University in 1982. Her thesis was on the topic of equality of employment opportunities for women in the United Kingdom and the United States.

== Academic career ==
Elizabeth Meehan's first full-time lectureship was at the University of Bath, commencing in 1986, where she taught politics. In 1989 she was granted leave to take up a Hallsworth Fellowship for early career researchers in Manchester University. In 1991 she was appointed professor of politics at Queen's University Belfast, making her the first female professor of politics on the island of Ireland. She was further appointed Jean Monnet Professor of European Studies in 1992.

Among other posts of responsibility at Queens, she was appointed Dean of the Faculty of Economics and Social Sciences in 1995.

In 1998–1999, while on sabbatical, Meehan spent a year as visiting fellow at The Policy Institute, Trinity College Dublin. During this time she published a ground-breaking paper, Free Movement between Ireland and the UK from the "common travel area" to The Common Travel Area, supported by the Irish Department of Justice, Equality and Law Reform.

After returning to QUB, Meehan founded the interdisciplinary Institute of Governance, Public Policy and Social Research, of which she was the Director.

Meehan retired from Queens in 2005, becoming professor emerita of Law, and continued to be active in research and academic life.

== Appointments and awards ==
Elizabeth Meehan was the first woman to chair the Political Studies Association, from 1993 to 1996. She went on to become President of the PSA and in 1999 was made life vice-president of the Association. She received a lifetime achievement award from the PSA in 2005.

In 2006, the University Association for Contemporary European Studies gave her a lifetime achievement award to recognise her contribution to European Community Studies in Ireland.

Following her retirement she held a number of honorary positions. She was adjunct professor in the School of Politics and International Relations, University College Dublin, contributing to the Institute for British-Irish Studies. She also held an honorary position in the School of Social and Political Science at the University of Edinburgh.

In 2007 she was appointed to the board of the Irish National Economic and Social Council (NESC) by the Taoiseach Bertie Ahern as one of his 5 appointees.

A portrait of Elizabeth Meehan, by the artist John Kindness, hangs in the Great Hall at Queen's University Belfast. It was unveiled in 2008 for International Women's Day and commissioned by the School of Law, the Institute of Governance, the School of Politics, International Studies and philosophy, the Centre for Advancement of Women in Politics (CAWP) and the Queen's Gender Initiative.
