= Dale Engstrom =

American politician

Member of the Tennessee House of Representatives from the 7th Hamilton County district
- In office January 12, 1971 – January 9, 1973
- Preceded by: Ray White
- Succeeded by: Constituency abolished

Personal details
- Born: April 15, 1917
- Died: January 22, 2018 (aged 100) Forest City, North Carolina, U.S.
- Party: Republican
- Spouse: Lena Mayberry
- Children: 3, including 2 stepchildren
- Education: University of Wisconsin; University of Maryland; University of Vienna
- Occupation: Politician; officer; businessman

Military service
- Allegiance: United States
- Branch/service: United States Army
- Years of service: 1934–1961
- Rank: Lieutenant colonel

Dale M. Engstrom (April 15, 1917 – January 22, 2018) was an American businessman, United States Army officer and politician.

Engstrom went to the University of Wisconsin and graduated from the University of Maryland. He served in the United States Army from 1944 to 1961 during World War II and the Korean War. Engstrom was commissioned a lieutenant colonel. He retired from the army. He was in the insurance business and was the co-owner of an appliance parts warehouse in Chattanooga, Tennessee. Engstrom lived in Soddy, Tennessee. He served in the Tennessee House of Representatives from 1971 to 1973 and was a Republican. Engstrom died in Forest City, North Carolina.
