= Peter von Krockow =

German fencer (1935–2018)

Personal information
- Born: 2 June 1935 Kauern, Germany
- Died: 25 January 2018 (aged 82)

Sport
- Sport: Fencing

Peter von Krockow (2 June 1935 – 25 January 2018) was a German fencer. He represented the United Team of Germany at the 1960 Summer Olympics in the team sabre event.
