= Ettore Peretti =

Italian politician (1958–2018)

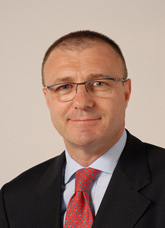
Ettore Peretti

Ettore Peretti (14 March 1958, Costermano sul Garda – 28 January 2018) was an Italian politician.

Born on 14 March 1958, Peretti was a member of the Union of the Centre. He served on the Chamber of Deputies between 1994 and 2008, and died of a heart attack while playing tennis on 28 January 2018.
