= Ernest H. Sanders =

German-born American musicologist

Ernest Helmut Sanders (4 December 1918 – 13 January 2018) was a German-born American musicologist.

Born Ernst Helmut Salomon in Hamburg to banker Paul Salomon and his wife on 4 December 1918, Sanders was educated at the Gelehrtenschule des Johanneums. He left Germany for the United States in 1938 and assumed the surname Sanders. His parents remained in Germany, where both committed suicide in September 1941. Sanders was admitted to the Juilliard School and studied under pianist Irwin Freundlich from 1947 to 1950. Sanders then attended Columbia University, where he met Paul Henry Lang, among others. After Sanders received a master's degree from Columbia, he became a lecturer there. He was named a Guggenheim Fellow in 1965, two years after receiving his doctorate, and subsequently appointed a full professor in 1972. His research interests included medieval English and French polyphony. Anonymous 4 member Susan Hellauer credited Sanders with inspiring much of the group's early work. He died aged 99 on 13 January 2018, at home in New York.
