= José Arturo Sierra =

Guatemalan jurist and lawyer

President of the Supreme Court of Justice of Guatemala
- In office 14 October 2013 – 14 October 2014
- Preceded by: Gabriel Medrano Valenzuela
- Succeeded by: Josué Felipe Baquiax

Personal details
- Born: March 19, 1943; El Progreso, Guatemala
- Died: January 26, 2018 (aged 74); Guatemala City, Guatemala
- Manner of death: Assassination by gunshots
- Occupation: Jurist, lawyer

José Arturo Sierra (March 19, 1943 – January 26, 2018) was a Guatemalan jurist and lawyer. Sierra served as a Justice of the Supreme Court of Justice of Guatemala from 2009 to 2014, including a tenure as the presiding President of the Supreme Court from October 2013 until October 2014.

== Life ==
José Arturo Sierra was born on March 19, 1943, in El Progreso Department, Guatemala.

In addition to his tenure on the Supreme Court, Sierra served as the President of Guatemala's national bar association, Colegio de Abogados y Notarios de Guatemala. He had previously served as a magistrate justice of the Constitutional Court of Guatemala from 1996 to 2001.

== Death ==
On January 26, 2018, Sierra was traveling in his car through the residential Zona 11 neighborhood of Guatemala City when armed men on a motorcycle approached his vehicle and opened fire. Sierra was shot several times in the attack. He was transported to Guatemala City's Roosevelt Hospital, the largest medical facility in the country, where he died at approximately 12:15 p.m. at the age of 74. Sierra's murder was called an assassination.
