= Ameloblastic carcinoma =

- Specialty: Oncology

Ameloblastic carcinoma is a rare form of malignant odontogenic tumor, that develops in the jawbones from the epithelial cells that generate the tooth enamel. It is usually treated with surgery; chemotherapy has not been proven to be effective.

== Signs and symptoms ==
Common symptoms of ameloblastic carcinomas are pain and swelling either localized in the jaw or throughout the entire face, dysphagia, and trismus. Less common symptoms include ulceration, loosening of the teeth, chronic epistaxis, facial pressure, and nasal dyspnea.

== Causes ==
It is speculated that some cases of ameloblastic carcinoma arise from remnants of epithelial tissue left behind after the development of the teeth and related structures. Other times, it may be caused by a benign odontogenic cyst becoming malignant, or a pre-existing ameloblastoma.

== Treatment ==
Chemotherapy has not proven effective in treating ameloblastic carcinoma, leaving surgical removal of the tumor one of the only options. Surgical resection with wide margins is the main treatment.

== Prognosis ==
Followup after surgery is important, as over 50% of recurrences occur within 5 years.
