= Byron Langley =

American politician (1926–2018)

Byron John Langley

Member of the North Dakota House of Representatives from the 12th district
- In office 1973–1980

Member of the North Dakota Senate
- In office 1985–1996

Personal details
- Born: November 11, 1926 Warwick, North Dakota
- Died: January 13, 2018 (age 91) Carrington, North Dakota
- Party: Democratic
- Spouse(s): Deloris Forde (m.1947–2013; her death)
- Children: James E. Langley, Gene Langley, Preston Langley, Darla Miller, Maxine Nordick
- Profession: Farmer & Rancher

Byron J. Langley (November 11, 1926 – January 13, 2018), was an American North Dakota democratic politician who was a member of the North Dakota House of Representatives. He represented the 12th district from 1973 to 1980. He also served in the North Dakota Senate from 1985 to 1996. On April 21, 1993, the Fifty-third Legislative Assembly unanimously elected Langley to the office of the President Pro Tempore; which he held through 1994.

Langley served on numerous committees some of which included: Chairman Senate Industry, Business and Labor Committee, Member Senate Agriculture Committee, Natural Resources Committee and Waste Management Committee, member of the Governor's Fuel Assistance Advisory Commission, and member of Veterinarian School Committee of Old West Regional Commission. Langley retired from politics in 1996.

Langley was also a member of the Warwick Lutheran Church, Warwick Rod and Gun Club, Devils Lake Elks, New Rockford Eagles, North Dakota Stockmen's Association, and served as a trustee of the North Dakota Cowboy Hall of Fame. He was also a strong supporter of the North Dakota National Guard.

== Statement issued by U.S. Senator Heidi Heitkamp (January 19, 2018) ==
Byron Langley was a dedicated public servant and a larger-than-life figure. He loved his family, conversations about agriculture, and a good cattle auction— and his fine-tuned sense of humor and accompanying laugh were legendary. During his accomplished legislative career, Byron fought tirelessly for the Lake Region, and he was a cherished mentor to countless public servants. His colleagues valued his unyielding friendship and sought his thoughtful views on rural issues—insights from a life of hard work on the prairie. Byron was a champion of responsible land management, and he didn’t care if a policy was particularly popular among his colleagues—only that it would help ease the troubles of rural North Dakotans. Byron truly represented the best values of our state— participating actively in the community, checking in on neighbors going through tough times, and passing on the farming and ranching lifestyle to his children and grandchildren. My thoughts are with the Langley family during this difficult time, and his humble leadership and commitment to the people of North Dakota live on in those whose lives he touched.
