= LaFayette Duckett =

American politician (1918–2018)

LaFayette L. Duckett

Member of the Texas House of Representatives
- In office January 14, 1941 – January 14, 1947

Personal details
- Born: February 19, 1918 Fayetteville, Texas, U.S.
- Died: January 16, 2018 (aged 99)
- Party: Democratic
- Spouse: Ethel C. Duckett (died 2006)

LaFayette Lionel Duckett (February 19, 1918 – January 16, 2018) was an American politician. He served as a Democratic member in the Texas House of Representatives from 1941 to 1947, representing Wharton County. He focused on banking and taxation law.

Duckett died on January 16, 2018, at age 99.
