= Jose Santos Rios =

American military personnel

Mayor of Saipan
- In office January 8, 1982 – January 7, 1986
- Preceded by: Francisco Manibusan Diaz
- Succeeded by: Gilbert Castro Ada

Personal details
- Born: December 19, 1939
- Died: January 21, 2018 (aged 78)
- Spouse: Emilia Rios
- Children: 4

Jose Santos Rios (December 19, 1939 - January 21, 2018) was a Northern Mariana Islands politician and educator who served as the third Mayor of Saipan from January 8, 1982, until January 7, 1986. The present-day office of mayor, which governs the territorial capital, was created in 1978 following the declaration of the Northern Mariana Islands as a Commonwealth in January 1978.

Santos was born on December 19, 1939. He enlisted in the United States Army and served in the Korean War during the early 1950s. Santos would later join the United States Peace Corps and was stationed on the Micronesian island of Chuuk.

Jose Santos Rios died on January 21, 2018, at the age of 78. He was survived by his wife, Emilia Rios, and their four children, Roy Rios, Marie Martinez, Remay McNally, and Joseph Rios Jr. Jose Santos Rios was given a military funeral with burial at a veterans cemetery in Washington state on February 2, 2018. An official memorial service was held at the Saipan Leadership Memorial Courtyard, also known as the kiosku, in Chalan Kanoa on February 23, 2018. Dignitaries in attendance included Governor Ralph Torres, U.S. Rep. Gregorio Sablan, Saipan Mayor David M. Apatang, and members of the Northern Mariana Islands Commonwealth Legislature.
