= Rail transport in Senegal =

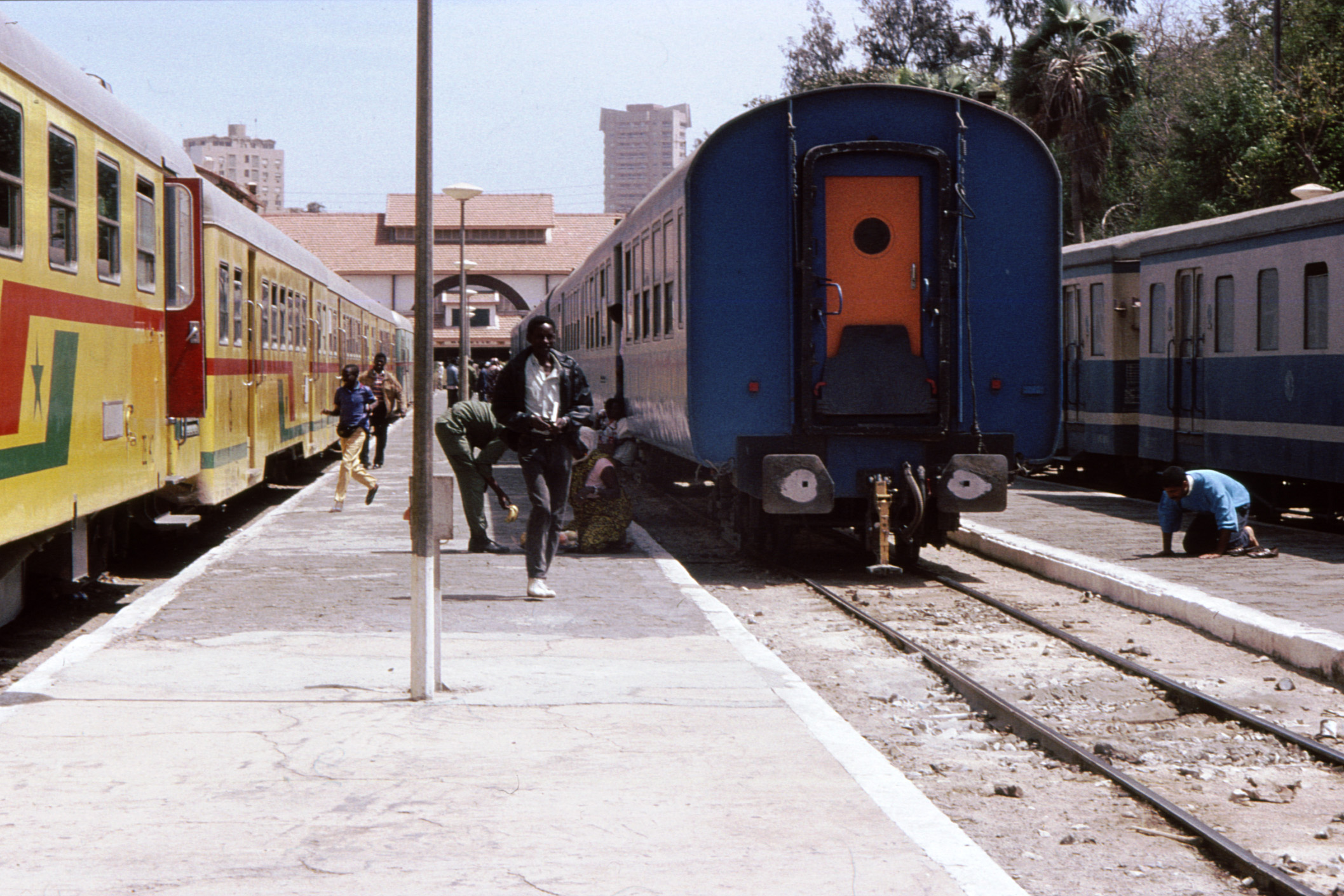
- Trains at Dakar railway station, Senegal, in 1991

Operation
- Infrastructure company: Chemins de fer du Sénégal (CFS)
- Major operators: Grands trains du Sénégal (GTS), Grande Cote Operations, SociÈtÈ D'Exploitation Ferroviaire Des ICS

System length
- Total: 1,087 km (675 mi) historic
- Electrified: 36km
- Freight only: 532km

Track gauge
- Main: 1,000 mm (3 ft 3 3/8 in)
- 1,435 mm (4 ft 8 1/2 in): 36 km (22 mi)
- 1,000 mm (3 ft 3 3/8 in): 602 km (374 mi)

Features
Map

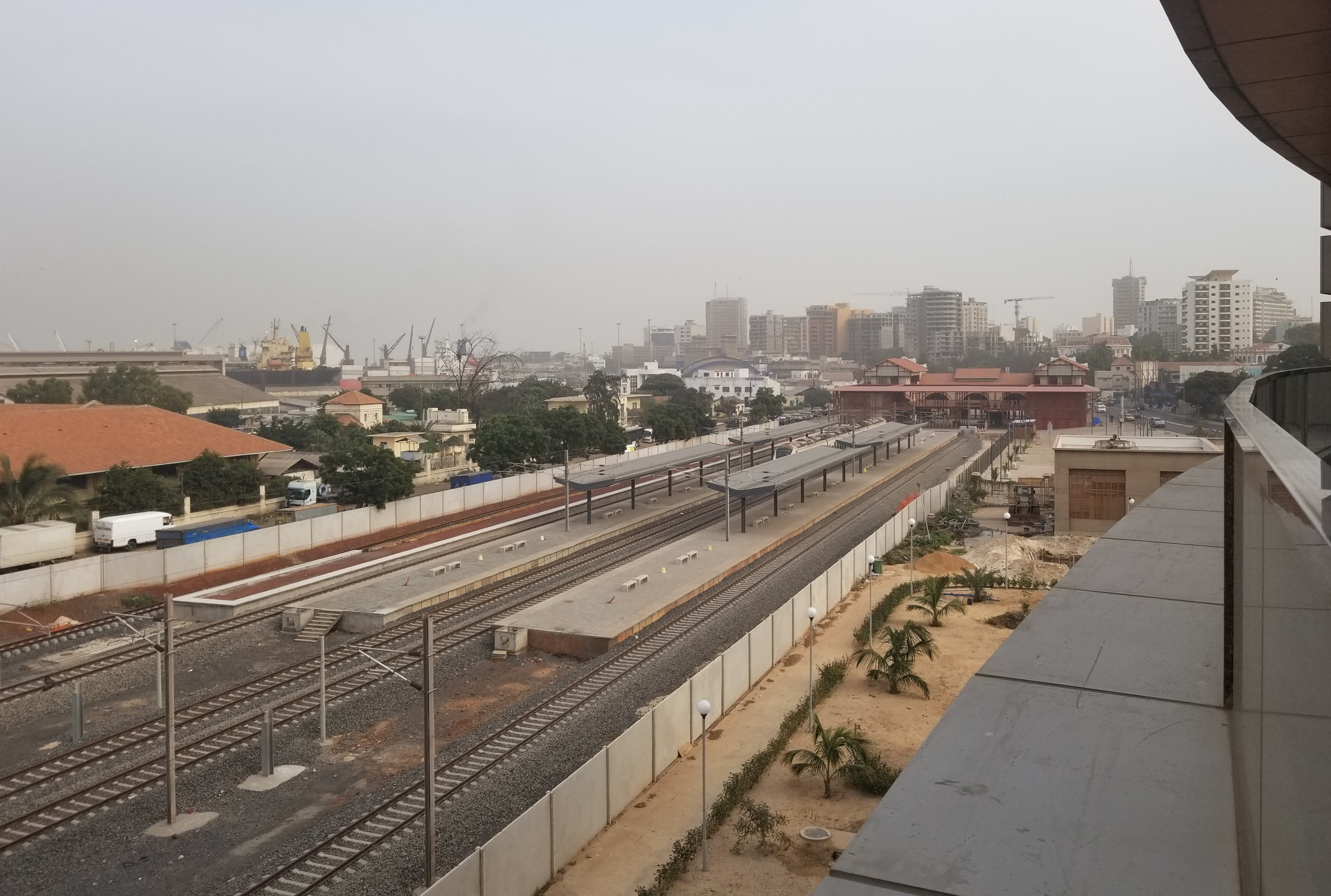
The rebuilt station at Dakar 2019

Senegal's historic rail network totalled 1,087 km of railway at 1,000 mm (3 ft 3 3/8 in) gauge, and 36 km at 1,435 mm (4 ft 8 1/2 in) gauge. The current (2026) operational length is 602 km and 55 km respectively.

The metre-gauge network is part of the Dakar–Niger Railway which crosses the border to Mali.

The single standard gauge line is a commuter railway in Dakar, the Train Express Regional Dakar-AIBD, whose first and second phase opened in 2021 and 2026 respectively.

== Routes ==
Senegal was formerly part of the federation of French West Africa so the history of its railways is closely linked to that of its neighbours.

=== Standard Gauge Lines ===
==== Train Express Regional ====
This line was in construction from 2016 and was officially inaugurated in 2019, although the first passenger run was not until December 2021. It links Dakar and Blaise Diagne International Airport, via Diamniadio.

Location	Distance	Cumulative distance	Notes
Dakar	0 km	0 km	
Diamniadio	36 km	36 km	Standard Gauge TER and Metre Gauge lines run parallel to here
Blaise-Diagne International Airport (AIBD)	19 km	55 km	

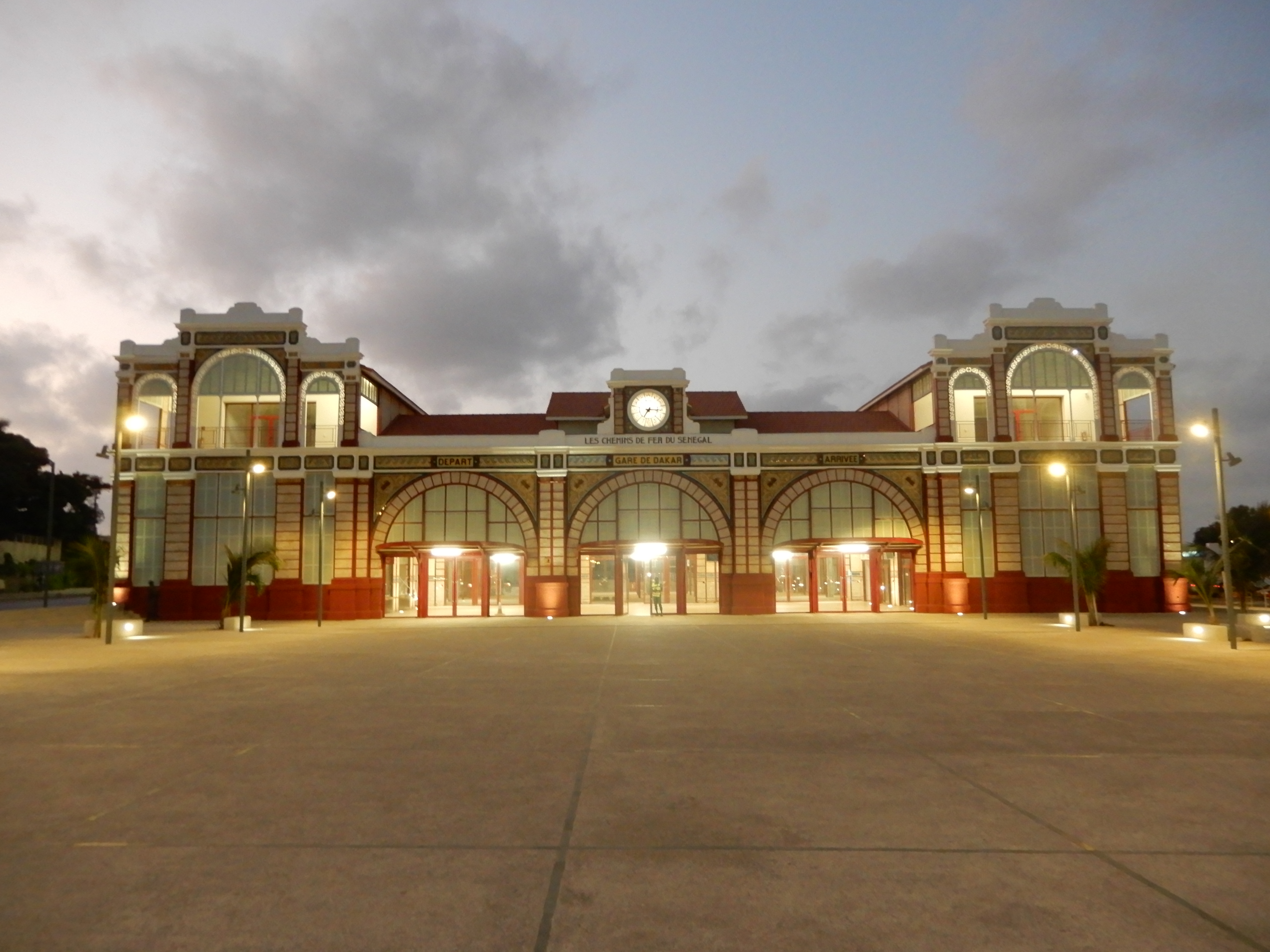
The refurbished station building at Dakar 2019

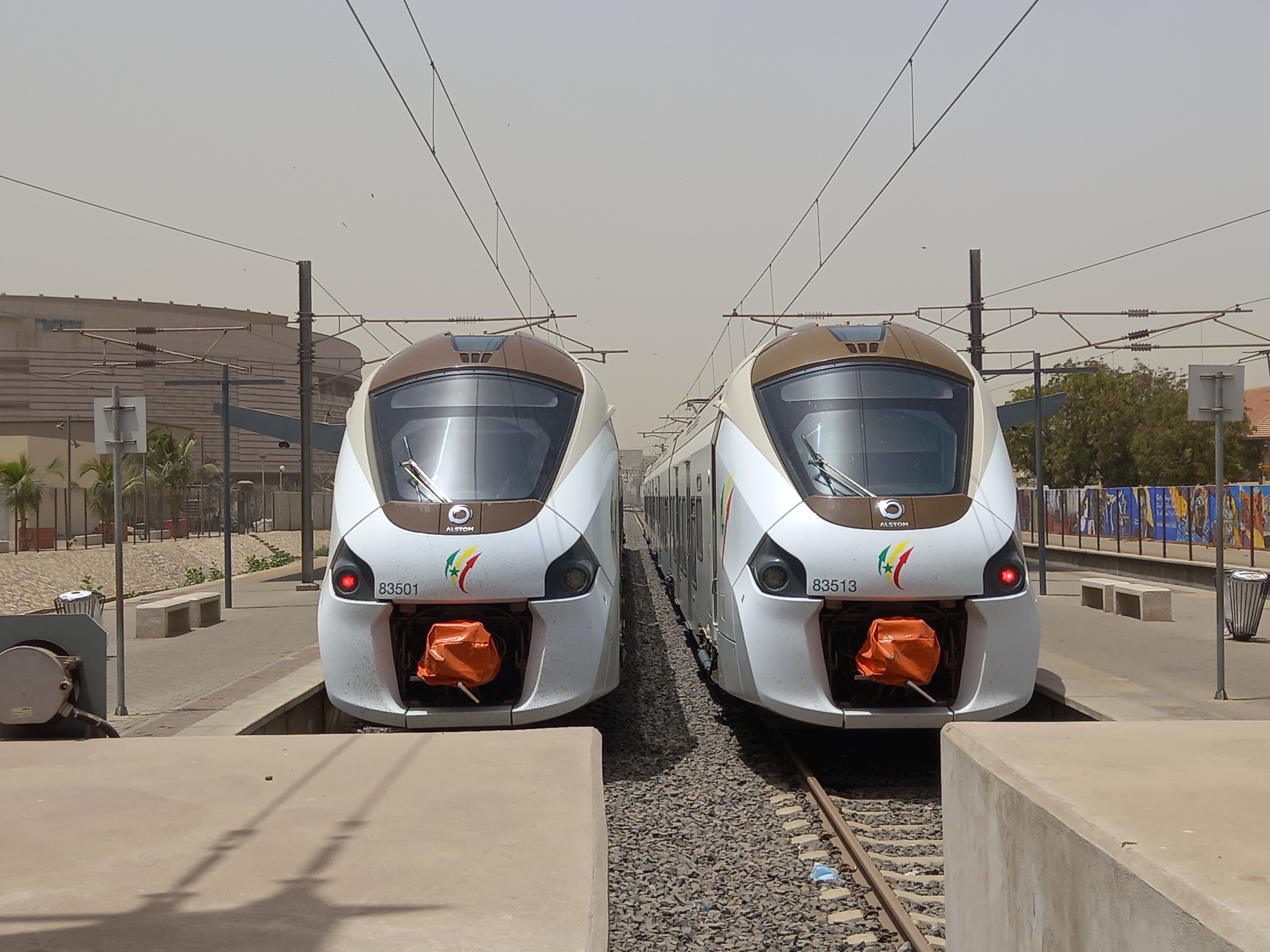
TER trains at Dakar 2023

=== Metre Gauge Lines ===
==== Dakar–Saint-Louis railway ====
This was the first railway line in French West Africa when it opened in 1885. It is now mostly out of service, although some trains operate on parts of the line conveying phosphates and other minerals from mines in the Louga region to Dakar.

A project supported by the World Bank saw the line from Dakar to Tivaouane improved. An extract from the June 1981 news release provides detail of the project:

"The $23.4 million project includes the upgrading and renewal of about six kilometers of siding track of the Regie des Chemins de Fer du Senegal (RCFS), which serve the ICS fertilizer plant at Mbao, about 15 kilometers from Dakar; the construction of terminal track works at Mbao, Darou Khoudoss, and the Port of Dakar; and the purchase of three mainline locomotives, three shunting locomotives, about 50 tank wagons, and about 30 hopper wagons, as well as spare parts for this equipment. The project also provides for the construction and equipping of a workshop for locomotive and wagon maintenance at Darou Khoudoss, near ICS's Taiba phosphate mine."

A 2014 project saw the line between Tivaouane and Mekhe refurbished, with a section of new line built from there to Grande Côte Operations Mineral Sands project in the Darou Beye area.

Location	Distance	Cumulative distance	Notes
Dakar	0 km	0 km	
Diamniadio	36 km	36 km	Standard Gauge TER and Metre Gauge lines run parallel to here
Thies	34 km	70 km	Junction. Location of main workshops
Tivaouane	22 km	92 km	Junction
Mékhé	28 km	120 km	Junction. Extent of current operations (2024)
Louga	73 km	193 km	
Saint Louis	70 km	263 km	
Darou Khoudoss	19 km		ICS phosphate mine, branch from Tivaouane
Darou Beye	22 km		Grande Côte Operations mine, branch from Mékhé
Linguere	129 km		Branch from Louga

==== Dakar–Niger Railway ====
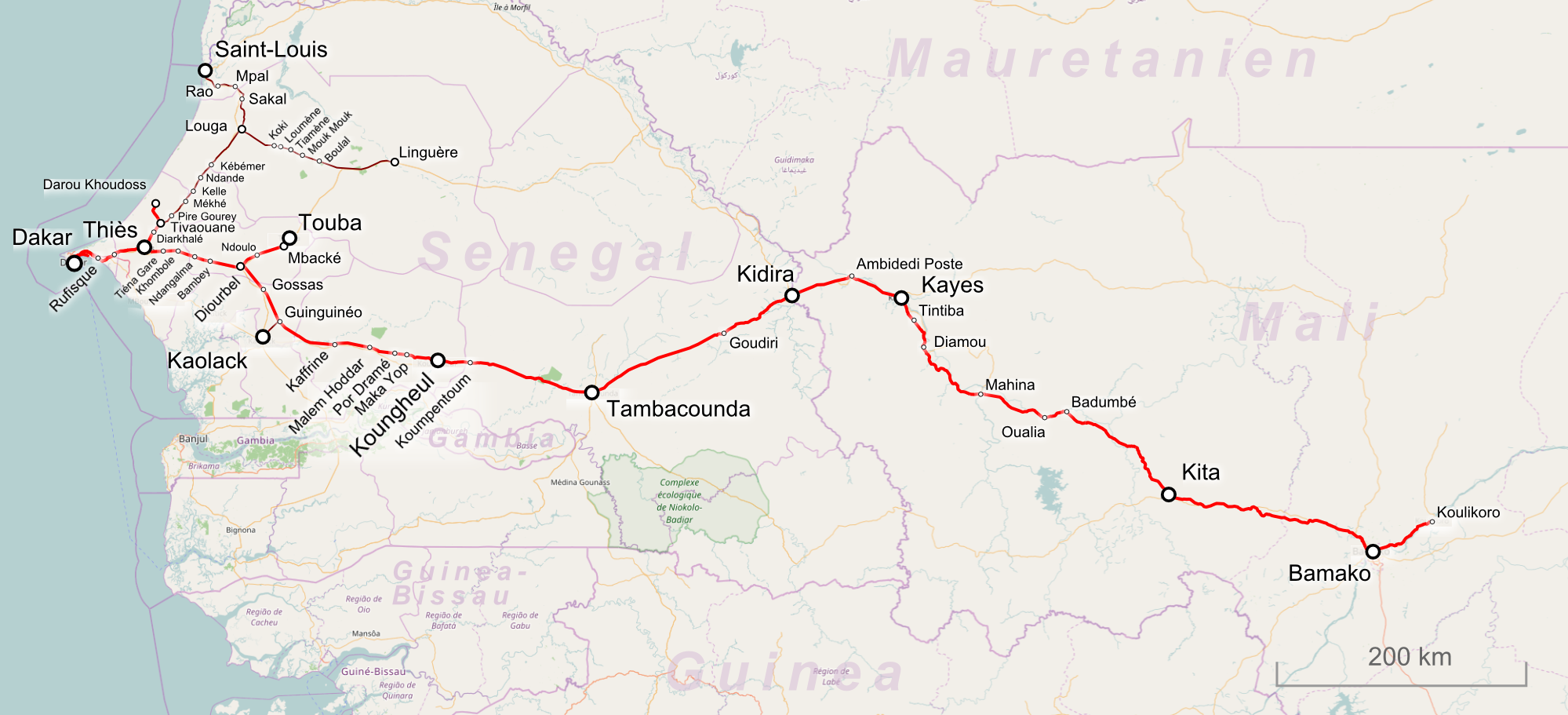
Map of the Dakar–Niger Railway

Construction work on the Dakar–Niger Railway began in 1882 and was completed in 1924.

The railway was previously concessioned to Transrail, managed by the Belgian company Vecturis. It is now controlled by Chemins de fer du Sénégal (CFS). Passenger services are operated by Les Grands trains du Sénégal SA (GTS-SA).

International passenger trains ceased in 2010 and freight trains ceased in 2018.

A scheduled passenger service between Kayes and Bamoko, 487 km, (both in Mali) restarted in 2023.

Special passenger services operated from Dakar and on the branch between Diourbel and Touba in 2023 and 2024 in connection with Grand Magal of Touba.

in June 2023, as part of President Macky Sall's project to rebuild Senegal's rail capacity, a test run was conducted between Thies and Diourbel, with a full opening planned for December 2023 or January 2024. This was a first step towards the eventual goal of re-establishing a rail connection between Dakar and Tambacounda which was achieved in 2024.

A re-instated scheduled passenger service between Dakar (Diamniadio TER station) and Thies was announced in February 2024.

Location	Distance	Cumulative distance	Notes
Dakar	0 km	0 km (a)	
Diamniadio	36 km	36 km (a)	Standard Gauge TER and Metre Gauge lines run parallel to here
Thies	34 km	70 km (a)	Junction. Location of main workshops
Diourbel	79 km	149 km	Junction
Guinguineo	55 km	204 km	Junction
Tambacounda	260 km	464 km	Extent of current operations (2024)
Kidira	179 km	643 km	Station before Senegal/Mali border
Senegal/Mali border	2 km	645 km	
Kayes (Kayes-Plateau)	91 km	736 km	Extent of current operations (2024) towards Bamako. Junction for short branch to Kayes-Ville.
Medine	8 km	744 km	Junction for short branch to Medine-Ville
Bamako	479 km	1,223 km	Extent of current operations (2024)
Koulikoro	65 km	1,288 km	
Touba	47 km		Branch from Diourbel
Kaolack	21 km		Branch from Guinguineo
Lyndiane	11 km		Branch from Kaolack

Note: (a) - shared distance with Dakar–Saint-Louis railway.

==== Petit train de banlieue ====
The Petit train de banlieue (PTB) was a passenger train providing regular commuter services on the metre gauge line between Dakar railway station and Thiès, via Thiaroye and Rufisque. It was inaugurated in December 1987 but was discontinued in 2016. Replaced in part by the standard gauge TER route.

== Developments since 2000 ==
A gauge conversion from 1,000 mm (3 ft 3 3/8 in) to 1,435 mm (4 ft 8 1/2 in) was planned.

In August 2006 RITES of India was to supply five metre-gauge locomotives, with vacuum brakes converted to air brakes.

In October 2007 70 air braked coaches were ordered from Rail Coach Factory in India. A 750 kilometres (470 mi) rail line was planned to Faleme River region of South East Senegal for iron ore traffic.

In 2010, the Faleme project has been delayed by disputes between the leaseholders. In the meantime, the Dakar-Port Sudan Railway project surfaced.

== See also ==
- Railway stations in Senegal
- Transport in Senegal
- West Africa Regional Rail Integration
