= Petit train de banlieue =

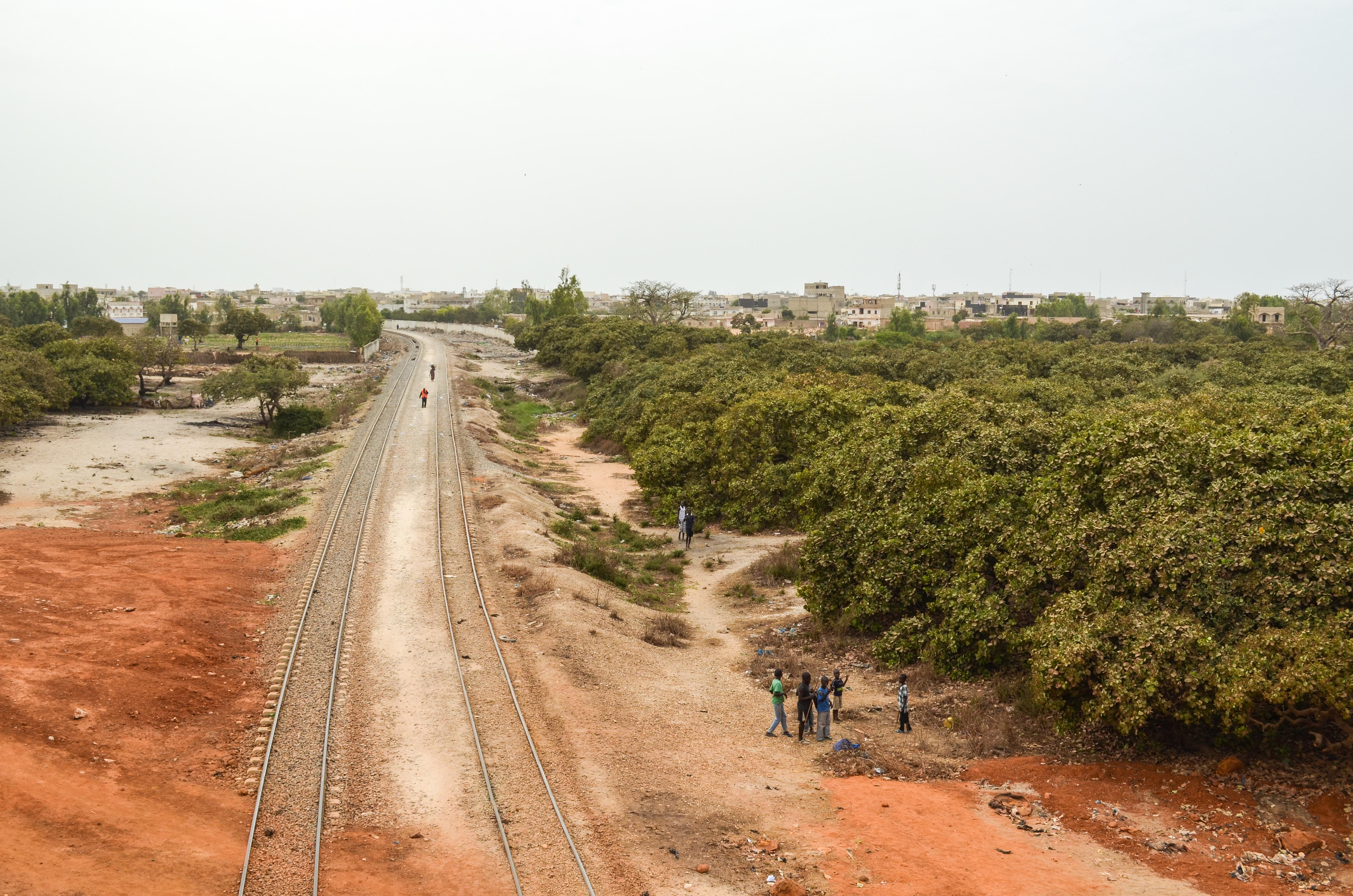
- The PTB line near Thiaroye

Overview
- Termini: Dakar; Thiès
- Stations: Dakar, Hann, Thiaroye, Rufisque, Bargny, Thiès

Service
- Type: Commuter rail
- Daily ridership: 25,000 (2013)

History
- Opened: 1987
- Closed: 2016

Technical
- Track length: 80 km (49.71 mi)
- Number of tracks: Double track between Dakar and Thiès
- Track gauge: 1,000 mm (3 ft 3 3/8 in) metre gauge

The Petit train de banlieue (PTB) was a passenger train providing regular commuter rail service between Dakar railway station and Thiès via Thiaroye and Rufisque.

== History ==
In December 1987, the service was started under the name "Petit train bleu" (Little Blue Train) by the Société nationale de chemins de fer du Sénégal (SNCS). The train ran 10 times per day (12 times according to the Senegalese Government) between Dakar and Thiaroye. This augmented to 22 runs per day in February 1988, 36 in December 1990, and 38 from 1992.

On June 2, 2003, the Petit Train de Banlieue was created as a société anonyme owned by the state. It is nowadays heavily used and served almost 5 million passengers in 2009.

In addition to the Dakar–Rufisque line, the PTB ran services between Dakar and Thiès.

In 2015, the Government announced plans to build a new parallel electrified standard gauge line called Train Express Regional as far as Diamniadio, 36 kilometres from Dakar. This will be followed by a 19 km branch to the Blaise Diagne International Airport, near Ndiass.

The PTB service was discontinued in 2016.

== Statistics ==
Year	Passengers	Change
2006	3 037 917	
2007	4 587 042	+50,1% ▲
2008	4 154 225	-10,4% ▼
2009	4 920 516	+18,4% ▲
2010	3 811 189	-22,5% ▼

== See also ==
- Rail transport in Senegal
- Railway stations in Senegal
- Dakar–Niger Railway
