= Dakar–Niger Railway =

Railway connecting Dakar, Senegal and Koulikoro, Mali

Dakar-Niger Railway
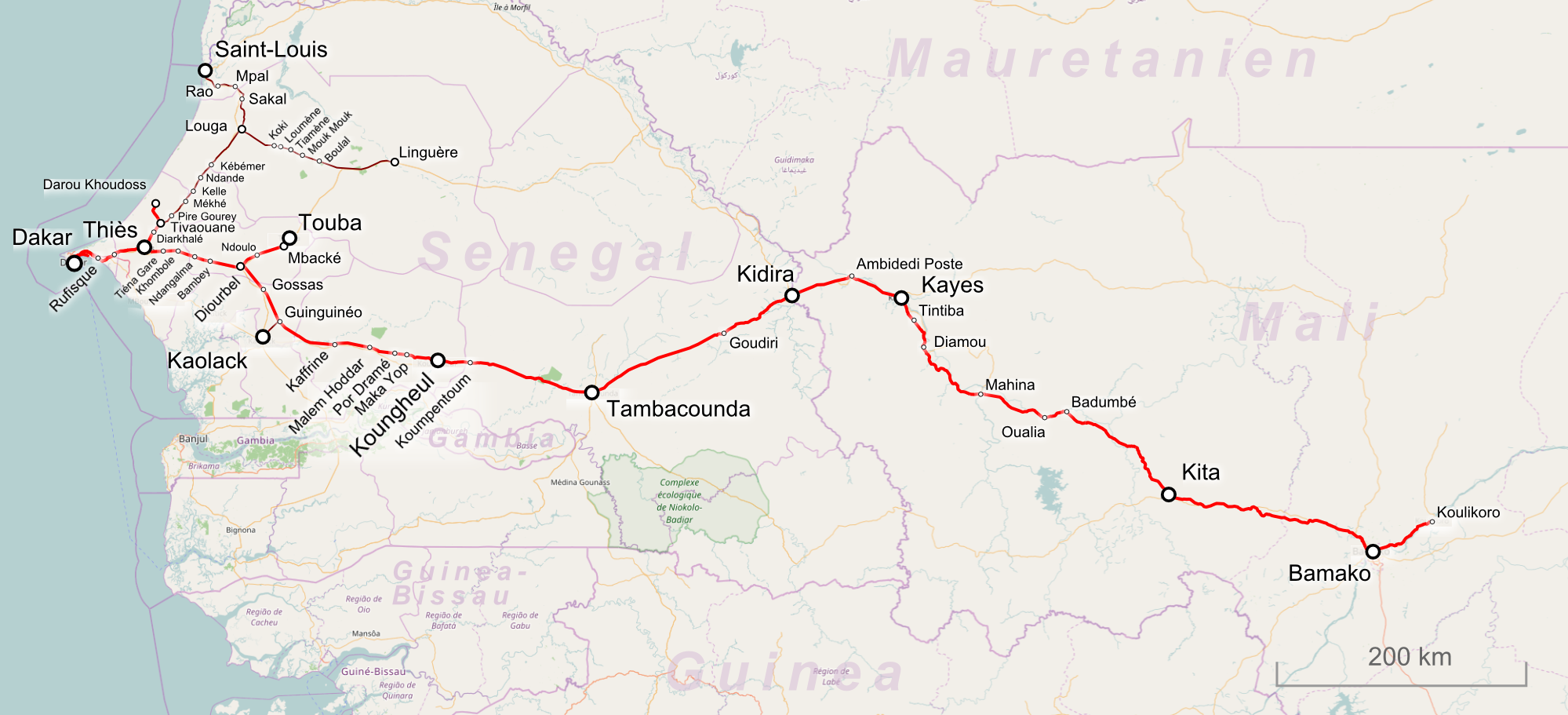
- Map of the Dakar–Niger Railway

Overview
- Native name: Chemin de fer Dakar-Niger
- Termini: Dakar, Senegal; Koulikoro, Mali
- Stations: Dakar, Thiès, Tambacounda, Kayes, Kita, Kati, Bamako, Koulikoro

Service
- Type: Heavy rail

History
- Opened: 1 January 1924

Technical
- Track length: 1,287 km (799.70 mi)
- Number of tracks: Double track between Dakar and Thiès; Single track otherwise
- Track gauge: 1,000 mm (3 ft 3 3/8 in) metre gauge
- Operating speed: 65 km/h (40 mph)

The Dakar–Niger Railway (French: Chemin de fer Dakar-Niger) connects Dakar, Senegal to Koulikoro, Mali. The name refers to the Niger River, not the Republic of Niger. It serves many cities in Senegal, including Thiès, and in Mali, including Kayes, Kita, Kati, Bamako. The line covers a course of 1,287 km of which 641 km lies in Mali.

There have been no international passenger trains in operation since 2010. A scheduled passenger service between Kayes and Bamako (both in Mali) restarted in 2023.

== History ==
=== Construction ===
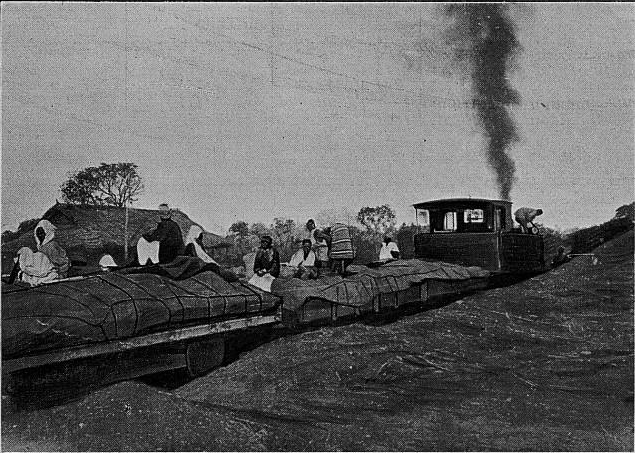
A train traveling along the railroad c. 1908

Construction work on the Dakar–Niger Railway began at the end of the 19th century under the French general Gallieni, commander of French Sudan.

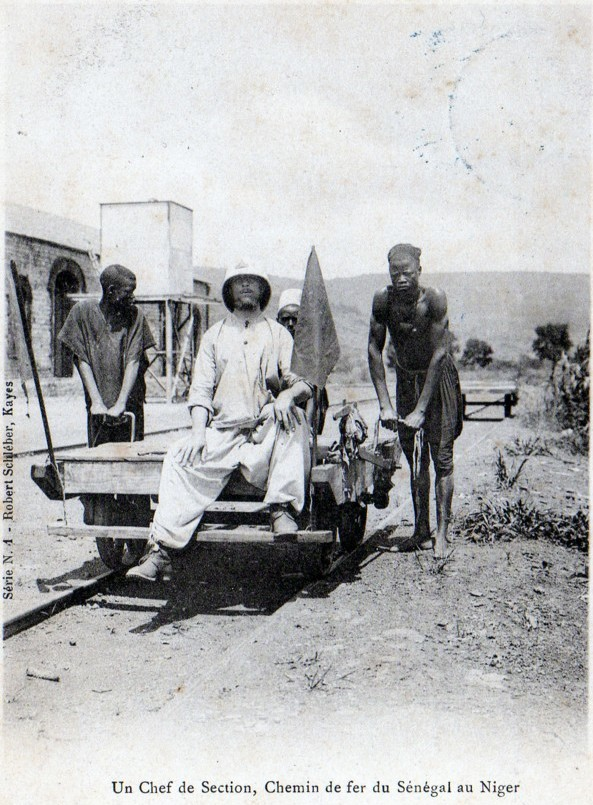
A French colonial railroad inspector and three unidentified men in 1904

The railroad initially connected Kayes (Kayes-Ville terminal) on the Senegal River to Koulikoro on the Niger River, this section being inaugurated in 1904. Later construction saw a line extended to Kayes (Kayes-Plateau) from Thies where a connection was made with the Dakar–Saint-Louis railway thus giving access to the port of Dakar, allowing the transport of raw materials across the globe. This section of the line opened in 1924.

Within Senegal a branch was built to Kaolack on the Saloum River (around 1911/1912 sources differ).

A second branch was built to Mbacké, an administrative centre, and Touba, an important religious centre (around 1931 to 1933 sources differ).

Within Mali short branches served the towns of Kayes (actually the original line as built in 1904) and Medine.

=== Modernisation ===
Under French administration a modernisation programme was undertaken in the 1947 to 1957 period. This saw improvements to the track, signalling and complete conversion from steam to diesel operation. The latter part of this programme was supported by The World Bank in 1954.

=== 1947 strike ===
In 1947, the railroad workers went on a several-month strike to obtain the same rights as the French railwaymen. They succeeded in winning a 20% raise, though strike leaders were jailed or fired. The strike was celebrated as a turning point in the anti-colonial struggle by Senegalese writer Ousmane Sembène in his 1960 novel God's Bits of Wood.

=== Post-independence operation ===
With the independence of Mali and Senegal, after the break-up of the Mali Federation, control of the railroad was divided between two national organizations, the Régie des Chemin de fer du Mali (RCFM) and the Régie des Chemins de Fer du Sénégal. No international traffic was carried between the countries from September 1960 until July 1963. An agreement between Senegal and Mali in June 1963 determined the common operation of the line by the two railway companies.

=== World Bank projects ===
Following the initial project in 1954 the World Bank approved a number of projects from the mid-1960s to the early 2000s.

Mali, Railways, 1966, ref P001684

Senegal, Railways, 1966, ref P002273,

Senegal, Railways II, 1972, ref P002279,

Mali, Railways II, 1973, ref P001690

Mali, Railways III, 1977, ref P001698

Senegal, Railways III, 1978, ref P002301

Senegal, Transport Sector Adjustment, 1991, ref P002342

Mali, Transport Project, 1994, ref P001730

Senegal, Second Transport Sector Project, 1999

Mali, Transport Corridors Improvement Project, 2004, ref P079351

=== Privatization ===
In October 2003, Senegal and Mali privatized the railway following pressure from the World Bank. Transrail, a company owned by Canac-Getma (comprising the former Canadian National Railway rail consultancy subsidiary Canac and France's Getma) took over management of the line. Canac was acquired in 2004 by the American firm Savage Companies, and Savage sold its Transrail shares to Belgium's Vecturis in 2007.

Management issues and a lack of investment led to serious degradation of the infrastructure and rolling stock and numerous delays. In Senegal, the maximum speed of the trains in many places has been limited to 20 km/h due to the bad state of the tracks.

Despite Transrail's obligation to maintain a passenger service, they concentrated on the transport of goods. Many stations have been closed and the numbers of connections reduced, creating difficulties for isolated communities. Passenger services have been suspended since an accident on 13 May 2009 killed five and injured thirty-seven. A Dakar-bound train came off the tracks between Bala and Goudiry in Tambacounda Region, Senegal. Four carriages reportedly overturned, but no official cause was determined.

With continually degrading infrastructure and mounting security problems, passenger service was halted in May 2010. In 2015, the governments of Mali and Senegal terminated the concession to Transrail, and a new entity, Dakar-Bamako Ferroviaire, took its place. They reached an agreement with China Railway Construction Corp (International) to restore their respective parts of the line. Without measurable progress, however, freight service was suspended in 2018, leading to a 20% drop-in activity at the Port of Dakar.

Until 2015 the petit train de banlieue, a twice-daily service between Dakar and Thiès, ran on the Dakar-Niger rails. The Train Express Regional from Dakar to Diamniadio opened in 2021 on new standard gauge tracks parallel to the route.

== Current status ==
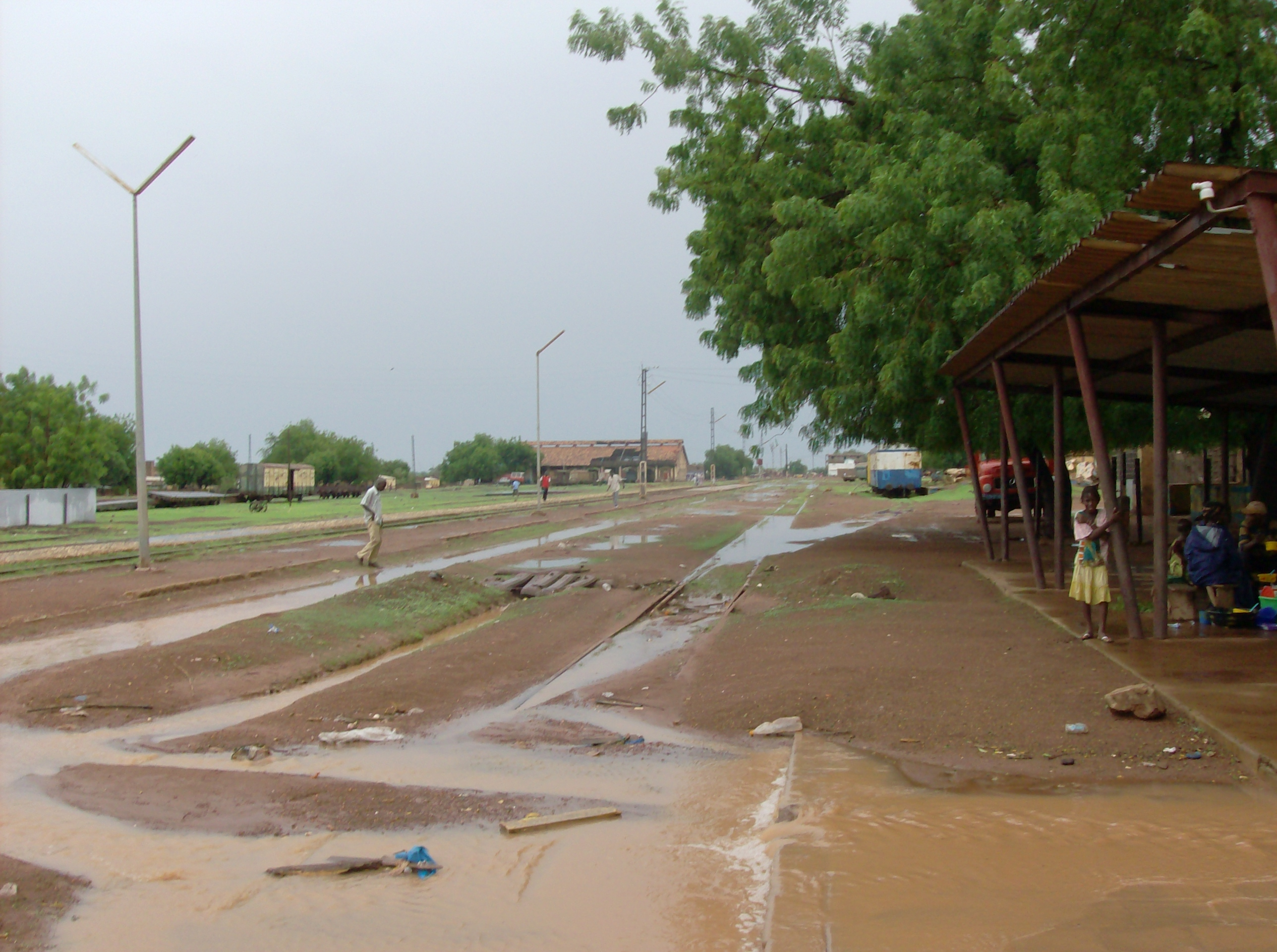
Tambacounda station, 2009

Within Senegal the only regular train on the Dakar-Niger route as of September 2023 is the TER. Nevertheless, the Senegalese government is currently working on rehabilitating the line as far as Tambacounda in order to reduce the number of trucks on the highways linking the Port of Dakar with Mali and other neighboring countries. An estimated 3-400 leave the port every day. In a second planned phase, a new standard gauge line to Tambacounda and eventually to Bamako will replace the current one. As a first step, in June 2023 a test run was conducted between Thies and Diourbel, with a full opening of that route planned for December 2023 or January 2024.

Within Mali a scheduled passenger service between Kayes and Bamako restarted in 2023.

== Statistics ==
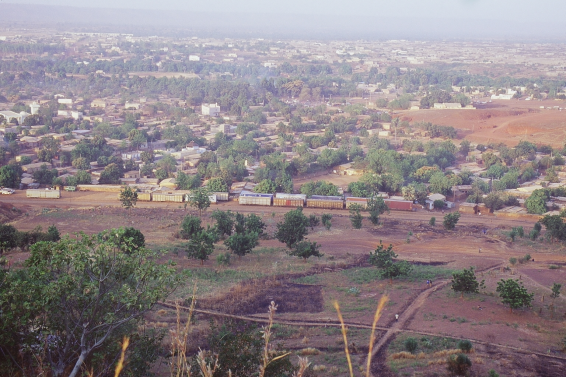
Kati station

"Tableau comparative des exportations par rail" No sources are given for any of this data, which shows the number of tons of different products exported in various years:

Product	1924	1934	1952–3	1955–6
Shelled peanuts	-	7,422	7,250	-
Peanuts in shells	4,125	1,990	55,000	147,900
Gum arabic	936	1,196	1,000	1,500
Karité	416	2690	9,750	-
Animal skins	787	841	10,000	-
Cotton	-	185	-	18,200
Millet	236	-	-	850,000

	1968
Passengers	3,574,000
Freight (in tonnes)	1,548,000

== Technical ==
- Gauge: 1,000 mm (3 ft 3 3/8 in)
- Brakes: The railway uses vacuum brakes.
- Couplers: Buffers and Chain, European - see loco CC2286.
- Highest point 1,515 feet (462 m) near Bamako.

== Branch lines ==
There are a number of branch lines including:

- Dakar–Saint-Louis railway, from Thiès to Saint-Louis
- Louga–Linguère
- Guinguinéo–Kaolack
- Diourbel–Mbaké
- Tambacounda–Baja Kunda (proposed)

== See also ==
- Rail transport in Mali
- Rail transport in Senegal
- Railway stations in Mali
- Railway stations in Senegal
- Transport in Mali
- Transport in Senegal
- West Africa Regional Rail Integration
