= Dakar–Saint-Louis railway =

Dakar–Saint-Louis Railway
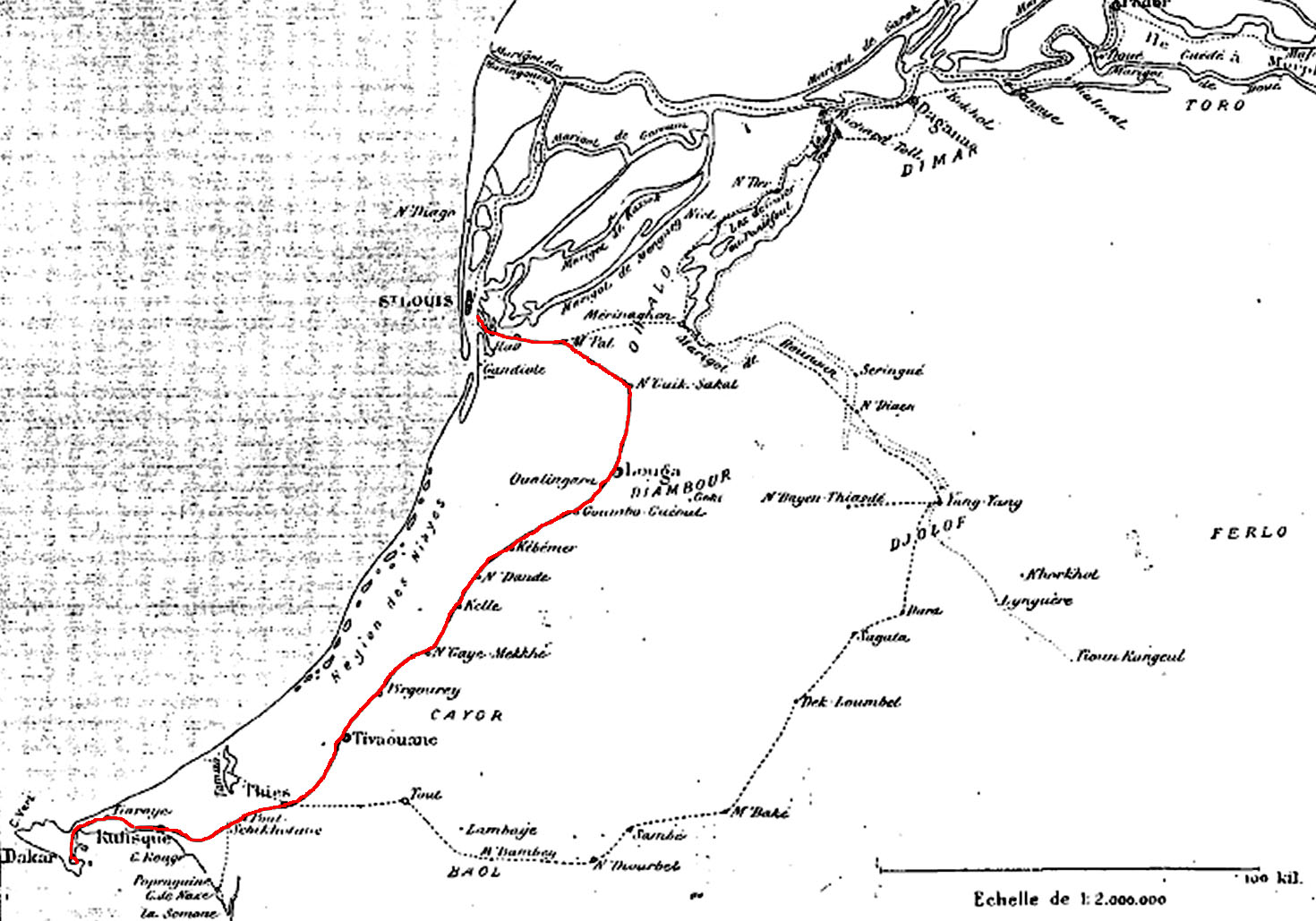
- The line shown on a 1901 map

Overview
- Native name: Chemin de fer Dakar-Saint-Louis
- Termini: Dakar; Saint-Louis
- Stations: Dakar, Thiès, Louga, Saint-Louis

Service
- Type: Heavy rail, disused

History
- Opened: 5 June 1885
- Closed: 2003?

Technical
- Track length: 265 km (164.66 mi)
- Num of tracks: 1
- Track gauge: 1,000 mm (3 ft 3 3/8 in) metre gauge

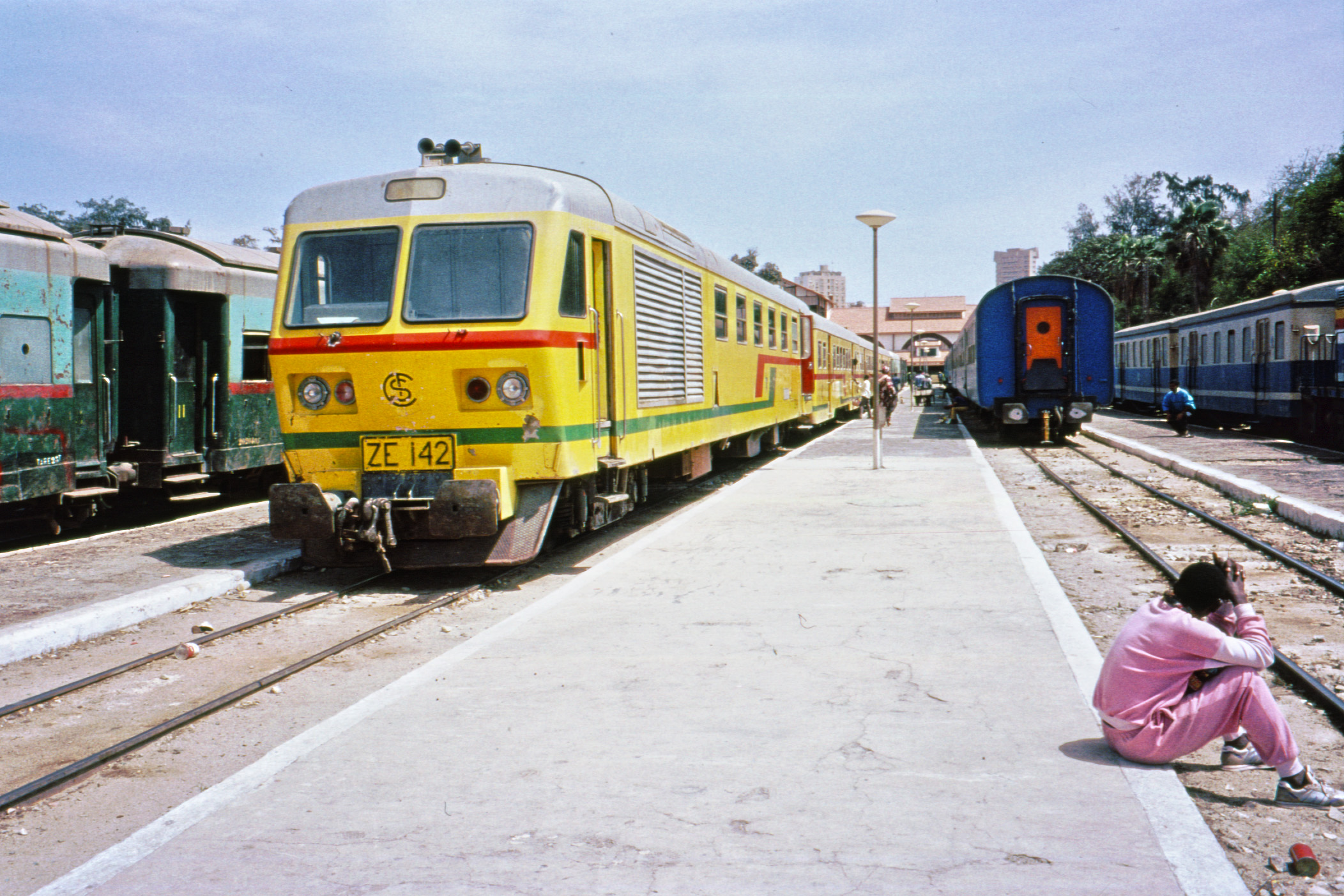
The train linking Dakar to Saint-Louis waiting for departure at Dakar railway station in 1991

The railroad linking Dakar (Senegal) to Saint-Louis (French: Chemin de fer Dakar-Saint-Louis) was the first railroad line in French West Africa when it opened in 1885. The section between Dakar and Mekhe remains in use for freight traffic. Beyond Mekhe the line is no longer in service.

== History ==
Like other railways constructed by the French colonial authorities in French West Africa, scholars have argued the line was inspired by American "pioneer" railways, to help authorities govern settlement and economic development, rather than to help existing populations move people or goods around. The line was referred to as the "peanut railroad", due to the peanut export sector and the growth of it around the route. The main route was completed around 1915.

Extensions to the line were built in the 1920s, finishing in 1933 with a 46 km single track line between Diourbel and Touba. This line was a commercial success, unlike other lines in the network.

The line was amalgamated with other colonial railroads in French West Africa, and after 1948 was operated by the Dakar Niger Railway. The route was still operating by 1991 and privatised in 1995, but seems to be no longer operational by the time Transrail took over as concession operator in 2003.
