= Diamniadio Lake City =

- Country: Senegal
- Region: Dakar
- Department: Rufisque
- Time zone: UTC+0 (GMT)

Diamniadio Lake City is a government approved futuristic township based in Diamniadio, Senegal. The township is conceptualized to ease the residential and commercial clutter in the capital of Dakar, which is currently the home to a quarter of the country’s 14 million people.

== History ==
The Diamniadio Lake City is part of President Macky Sall's plan to rebuild the city of Diamniadio and revitalize economy of Senegal. The project was approved in 2013 after Macky Sall became the President of Senegal in 2012. The development of the new city is taking place around 30 km from Dakar and it is close to the Blaise Diagne International Airport. The airport opened in December 2017. Although the project architectural design looks a lot like Akon City, they are not related in any kind, shape or form as stated by Semer Group.

== Construction ==
The idea behind the development of Diamniadio Lake City is to ease the population pressure on Dakar. The project attracted a lot of bids from local and international companies, including Germany’s state-owned KFW Development Bank, ultimately won by the Semer Investment Group, based in UAE and Senegal. The Semer Group is led by its CEO Diene Marcel Diagne, a Senegalese entrepreneur. The developers are working with the Senegalese government and other companies for a successful completion.

The project is estimated to cost $2 billion and will extend over an area of 1644 hectares. The Diamniadio Lake City will contain residential areas and business districts to accommodate hotels, fashion centers, Abdou Diouf International conference area, Dakar Arena for sports, research centers, exposition center, government ministries, universities, and other entertainment areas.

The time frame for building the new city is 10 years, as per the memorandum of understanding with the Senegalese government. The city will have several financial, transport, and educational hubs. The township as a whole, Diamniadio will be developed by 2035. The project promoter Semer Investment led by its CEO Mr Diene Marcel Diagne said the project will be built in phases with completion within 10 years.

== Transport ==
The new city is connected to Dakar through a 32 km express highway, which was projected to reduce the travel time from 90 minutes to an average of 30 minutes. The toll highway was opened in 2015, and extended to the Blaise Diagne International Airport in 2017.

The Train Express Regional (TER), Senegal's first new railway since independence, is being built in two phases. The first phase, comprising 14 stations between Dakar and Diamniadio, was scheduled to launch in the first quarter of 2019, and began regular passenger service at the end of 2021. The second phase, extending the line to the airport, was due to be completed the following year.
