= Binta Sarr =

Founder of the Association for the Advancement of Senegalese Women

- Born: 1954; Guinguinéo, Kaolack region, French Senegal
- Died: 15 September 2019 (aged 64–65)
- Education: University of Dakar

Binta Sarr Ly, better known as Binta Sarr (1954 – 15 September 2019) was a Senegalese women's rights activist, best known for founding the Association for the Advancement of Senegalese Women.

== Early life ==
Sarr was one of eleven children born into a polygamous family in the rural town of Guinguinéo. She would spend most of her life in the Kaolack region. Her father was a merchant who encouraged his daughters to pursue an education, encouraging them to "fight for [their] independence in all areas, economically and socially." For her early education, Sarr attended Kassaville Primary School, where she was a classmate of journalist and writer Adama Gaye.

In 1974, young people in Guinguinéo formed a voluntary association to advance "cultural action," engaging in academic discussions and hosting educational activities; Sarr became heavily involved with its operations. Through her involvement, she also met her future husband, though they would not marry until 1983.

=== Education ===
In 1978, Sarr received a scholarship to study chemistry and biology at the University of Dakar. At that time, the campus was a hub for pro-democratic student activism. During her time as a student, Sarr became involved in student advocacy and joined a committee responsible for organising strikes.

== Career ==
After graduating in 1982, Sarr returned to her hometown and joined Senegal's civil service as a hydraulic engineer. She remained in this profession for 13 years, overseeing projects including the installation of wells, roads, classroom infrastructure, and irrigation projects.

Early in her career, Sarr was assigned to a project concerning the maintenance of village water supplies. She realised that water management projects would be more successful if she consulted local women, as women were primarily responsible for fetching water. Her subsequent efforts to involve more women in water management would later be recalled as impressive by Fatou Sow.

This project, along with Sarr's view that lasting change required "articulated and coherent development programs", inspired her to found an association for women's education. She believed that small-scale credit programs or improving women's functional literacy would not lead to permanent improvement in the status of women alone.

== Association for the Advancement of Senegalese Women (APROFES) ==
In 1987, Sarr founded a grassroots organisation to provide professional development opportunities for women: Association pour la Promotion des Femmes Sénégalaises (APROFES; English: "Association for the Advancement of Senegalese Women").

Operating in rural areas of Senegal, one of APROFES' earliest offerings was leadership training. The association expanded to teach participants about agriculture and contraception, and installed community services. APROFES utilised radio broadcasts, seminars, and theatre productions to raise awareness of social problems, ranging from alcoholism to Senegal's caste system. The association also assisted Senegal's government in administering literacy surveys of students aged 9 to 14 to better understand educational needs. In 1991, Sarr formalised APROFES' status into a supportive organisation so that it could receive external funding; its first contributor was Oxfam.

By 1994, Sarr, in her capacity as a civil servant, was head of Kaolack's regional hydraulics division. That year, she worked with Eau Vive, a nonprofit dedicated to expanding access to drinking water, to construct a water network serving a dozen villages in Senegal. Her promotion of Eau Vive in the region led to the establishment of a permanent Senegal chapter. To expand the association's international reach, APROFES joined the partnership network of the Committee for the Abolition of Illegitimate Debt in 1996. In 2000, APROFES became a non-governmental organisation.

By the time of Sarr's death, APROFES was operational in 35 localities.

=== Gender parity case ===
In 2014, Sarr and APROFES challenged Kaolack's municipal council for failing to satisfy Senegal's constitutional law on gender parity, which requires equal representation of men and women in decision-making bodies. At the time, Kaolack's municipal bureau contained 8 members, of which only one was a woman. The case, initially dismissed by Kaolack's court of appeal, was ultimately heard in Senegal's highest court, the Court of Cassation. On 8 January 2015, the court ordered the municipal government to dissolve and introduce the required parity measures.

== Other work ==
=== International economics ===
Throughout her life, Sarr advocated for Africa to receive greater representation in discussions around international economics. In 1993, Sarr and APROFES endorsed recommendations to advance global food security, as put forward by the World Bank at its 1993 World Conference on Overcoming Global Hunger. She provided support to political scientist Éric Toussaint's 1999 work, Your Money or Your Life: The Tyranny of Global Finance. In 2002, she presented on Africa–Europe relations at the 2002 European Social Forum.

=== Government work ===
As part of the National Assizes of Senegal in 2008, Sarr was appointed by the Kaolack municipal administration to head a committee on citizens’ issues for the region. In 2012, Sarr provided advice to the government of Senegal, again on regional issues for Kaolack. Later, in January 2015, Senegal nominated Sarr to serve as the country's independent expert regarding the United Nations Convention to Combat Desertification.

=== Advocacy for women ===
In 2000, Sarr contributed an essay, Féminisation de la pauvreté au Sénégal ("The feminisation of poverty in Senegal") to a publication by the Committee for the Abolition of Illegitimate Debt. She argued that sustainable economic change would only be possible through teaching women the skills required to self-organise and lead their own immediate communities. Sarr also participated in the Royal Tropical Institute's West Africa Gender Inclusive Citizenship project in 2012, reporting on research conducted partly by APROFES on access to justice for victims of sexual violence in Senegal.

== Death and legacy ==
Sarr, having experienced poor health throughout her sixties, died 15 September 2019.

=== Legacy ===
APROFES continued to execute its mission following Sarr's death. In 2025, the association partnered with the United Nations' Food and Agriculture Organization to educate women in sustainable farming practices. Also that year, APROFES partnered with the Senegalese Council of Women to craft a plan for enforcing Senegal's gender parity provisions ahead of the 2027 elections.

Invisible Giants, an artistic project dedicated to chronicling notable African women, dedicated its 2019 "Coffee Table Book" to Sarr, describing her as "a giantess whose greatness was too soon removed from our affection." Sarr's life and work were showcased in a 2024 children's book, My Name is Yedia, written by Coumba Touré and illustrated by Beatrice Mutasah. Touré has described Sarr as her role model.
