= Guinguinéo department =

Coordinates: 14°16′N 15°57′W

Guinguinéo
- Department
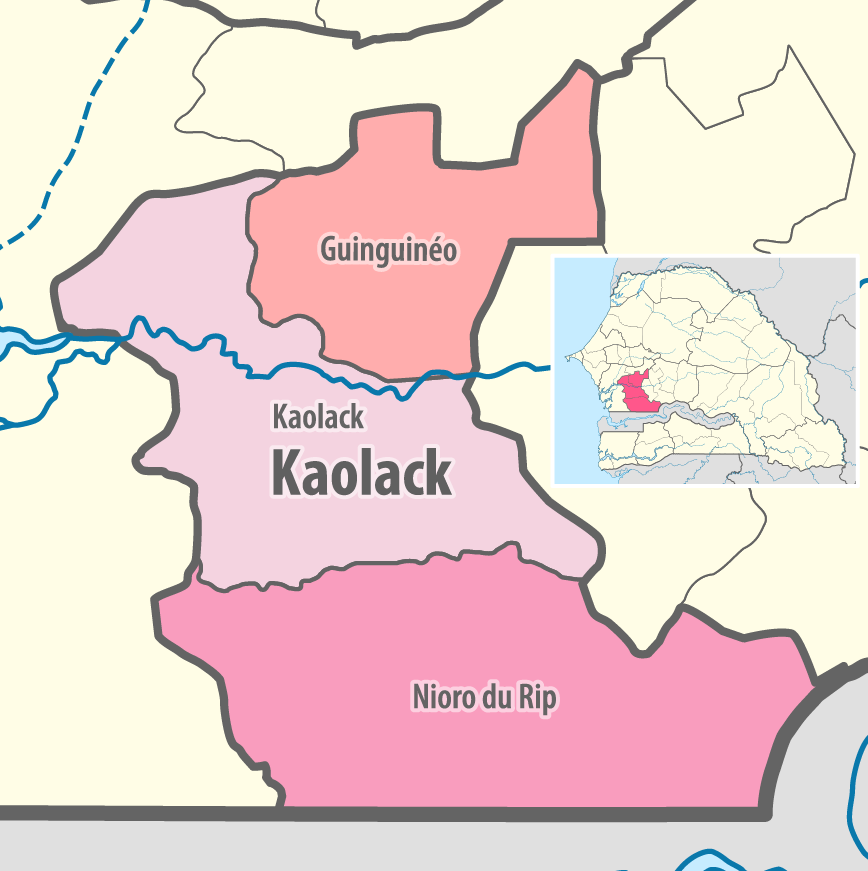
- Country: Senegal
- Region: Kaolack region
- Capital: Guinguinéo

Area
  - Total: 1,250 km^{2} (480 sq mi)

Population (2023 census)
  - Total: 160,483
  - Density: 128/km^{2} (333/sq mi)
- Time zone: UTC±00:00 (GMT)

Guinguinéo department is one of the 46 departments of Senegal, and one of three which form the Kaolack region. It was created by decree in 2008.

The department has three communes; Guinguinéo, Fass, and Mboss.

== Districts ==
The rural districts (communautés rurales) comprise:

- Mbadakhoune Arrondissement:
  - Khelcom Birane
  - Mbadakhoune
  - Ndiago
  - Ngathie Naoudé
- Nguélou Arrondissement:
  - Gagnick
  - Nguélou
  - Ourour
  - Dara Mboss
  - Panal Wolof
