= Aminata Mbengue Ndiaye =

Senegalese politician

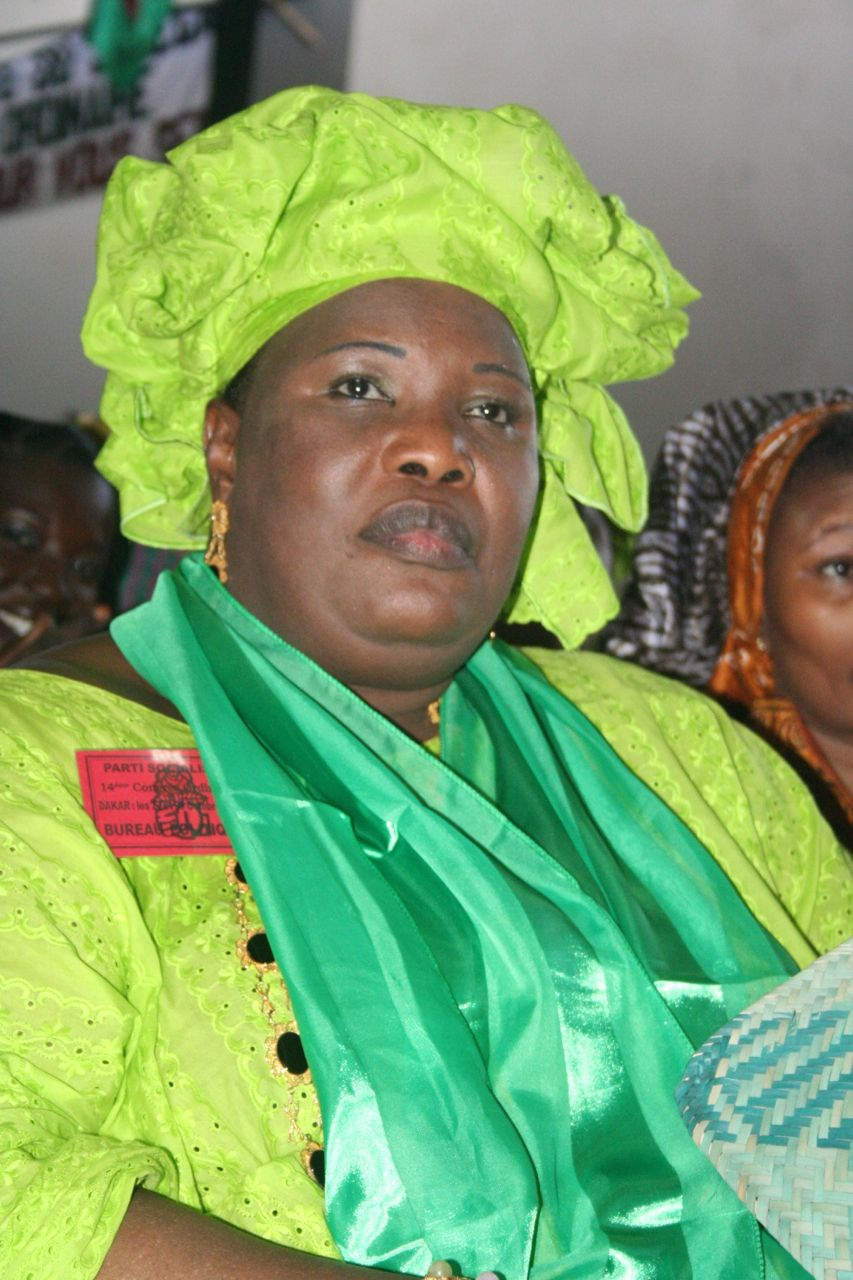
- Aminata Mbengue Ndiaye in 2008

Minister of Fisheries and Maritime Economy
- In office 5 April 2019 – 3 April 2020
- President: Macky Sall
- Preceded by: Oumar Guèye
- Succeeded by: Alioune Ndoye

Minister of Livestock and Animal Production
- In office 2012–2019

Personal details
- Born: Louga, Senegal
- Party: Socialist Party of Senegal
- Occupation: Politician

Aminata Mbengue Ndiaye is a Senegalese politician. In 2012, she was appointed Minister of Livestock and Animal Production in the government of Prime Minister Abdou Mbaye and from 2014 under the government of Prime Minister Mahammad Boun Abdallah Dionne until 5 April 2019, when she was named Minister of Fishery and Maritime Economy Ministre des Pêches et de l’Economie maritime. She also serves as mayor of Louga, and is currently chair of the women's movement of the Socialist Party of Senegal. Previously, Ndiaye served as Minister of Women, Children and the Family, as well as Minister of Social Development and National Solidarity under the presidency of Abdou Diouf.

Ndiaye is a member of the Pan-African Parliament.

== Biography ==
She was born to El Hadj Ali Mbengue, a civil servant, in Louga, Senegal. She attended Lycée Ahmed Fall in Saint-Louis and later Lycée Kennedy before École normale d'enseignement technique and École national d’économie appliqué. She played on the Senegalese national basketball team at the Second All African Games in Lagos, Nigeria in 1973.

== Bibliography ==
- "Aminata Mbengue Ndiaye", in The HerStory Project: Volume 1, edited by Anthonia Makwemoisa Amalion, Dakar, ISBN 9782359260038, 2011, page 211–217.
- "Aminata Mbengue Ndiaye : La 'gardienne du temple' socialiste", in Femmes au Sénégal, Les Cahiers de l'Alternance (Dakar), Konrad Adenauer Foundation and Centre d'études des sciences et techniques de l'information (CESTI), issue 10, December 2006, page 91. (in French)
