= Karamokho Ba =

Diakhanke marabout in the 18th century

Fode Kaba Doumbouya
- Born: 1734; Dide
- Died: unknown
- Occupation: Marabout
- Father: Mouhamadou Fatouma Diabi-Gassama

Salim Karamba Diabi-Gassama, better known as Karamokho Ba, was an 18th-century Jakhanke marabout and religious scholar who founded the important scholarly center of Touba in Guinea.

== Life ==
Karamokho Ba was born in the village of Dide, in what is now the Bala commune in Senegal. He was descended from a companion of Al-Hajj Salim Suwari. He founded Touba, on the main axis between the Imamate of Futa Jallon and Kaabu, in 1815. His students later spread all over the region, as far as Badibu.
