= Touba, Boké =

Touba
- Sub-prefecture and town
- Location in Guinea
- Coordinates: 11°36′00″N 13°02′00″W
- Country: Guinea
- Region: Boké Region
- Prefecture: Gaoual Prefecture

Population
  - Total: 26,260
- Time zone: UTC+0 (GMT)

Touba is a town and sub-prefecture in the Gaoual Prefecture in the Boké Region of north-western Guinea. As of 2014, it had a population of 26,260 people.

The city is a major center of Islam in the region, particularly the Qadiriyya Sufi order and the Jakhanke people.

== History ==
Touba was founded in 1815 by al-Hajj Salimu Kasama, better known as Karamokho Ba, on the main axis between the Imamate of Futa Jallon and Kaabu. By the late 1800s, it was one of the biggest slave markets of the region, and approximately 60% of a total population of 7000 were slaves.
