= Lydiane =

Town in east central Senegal in Kaolack region

Coordinates: 14°11′00″N 16°10′00″W

Lydiane is a town in east central Senegal in Kaolack region.

== Transport ==
It is the terminus of a branchline off the main Dakar-Niger Railway from Guinguinéo.

== See also ==
- Railway stations in Senegal
