= Kirène =

Town in Senegal

Kirène is a small town in western Senegal about 70 km from the capital, Dakar.

The local rugby club, Kirène RC, won the national championship in 2023.

== Transport ==
It lies about 20 km from the nearest railway station, Thiès, on the railway network of Senegal.

== Industry ==
The town has a large cement works, which has been expanded multiple times. An expansion initiated in 2020 is intended to allow the plant to produce 6 million tons of cement per year.

The town is also home to a bottling plant for SIAGRO (Société Industrielle Agroalimentaire) that produces bottled water "Kirène", nectar juice "Préssèa", simple milk "Candia", and flavored milk "Candy Up".

== See also ==
- Cement in Africa
