= Serigne Mouhamadou Fallilou Mbacké =

Senegalese religious leader

Serigne Mouhamadou Fallou Mbacké

Caliph of the Mouride Brotherhood
- In office 1945–1968
- Preceded by: Serigne Mouhamadou Moustapha Mbacké
- Succeeded by: Serigne Abdou Ahad Mbacké

Personal details
- Born: 1888 Daaru Salaam, Senegal
- Died: 1968 (aged 79–80) Touba, Senegal

Serigne Mouhamadou Fallou Mbacké (Serigne Muhammadu Fadal Mbacke; Wolof: Sëriñ Muhammadu Fallou Mbàkke; 1888–1968) was a Senegalese religious leader. He served as the second Caliph of the Mouride brotherhood, a large Sufi order based in Senegal, from 1945 until his death in 1968. He was the son of Sufi saint and religious leader Sheikh Amadou Bamba.

== Life ==
Serigne Mouhamadou Fallilou Mbacké was born in 1888 (on the 27th night of Rajab) in Daaru Salam, Senegal. He presided over the inauguration of the expansion of the Great Mosque of Touba on June 7, 1963. His eldest son is Serigne Modu Busso Dieng.
