= Serigne Abdou Ahad Mbacké =

Muslim Caliph of the Mouride Brotherhood
- In office August 6, 1968 – 1989
- Preceded by: Serigne Mouhamadou Fallilou Mbacké
- Succeeded by: Serigne Abdou Khadr Mbacké

Personal details
- Born: 1914; Jurbel, Senegal
- Died: 1989; Touba, Senegal

Serigne Abdou Ahad Mbacké (Serigne Abdul Ahad Mbacke; Wolof: Sëriñ Abdul Ahad Mbàkke; 1914-1989) was a Senegalese religious leader. He served as the third Caliph of the Mouride brotherhood, a large Sufi order based in Senegal, from 1968 until his death in 1989. He was the son of Sufi saint and religious leader Sheikh Amadou Bamba.

== Life ==
Serigne Abdou Ahad Mbacké was born in 1914 in Jurbel, Senegal. He became caliph on August 6, 1968 after the death of the second caliph Serigne Mouhamadou Fallilou Mbacké. He oversaw extensive infrastructural improvements for the city of Touba during his term as caliph.
