= Bala, Senegal =

Bala
- Town and commune
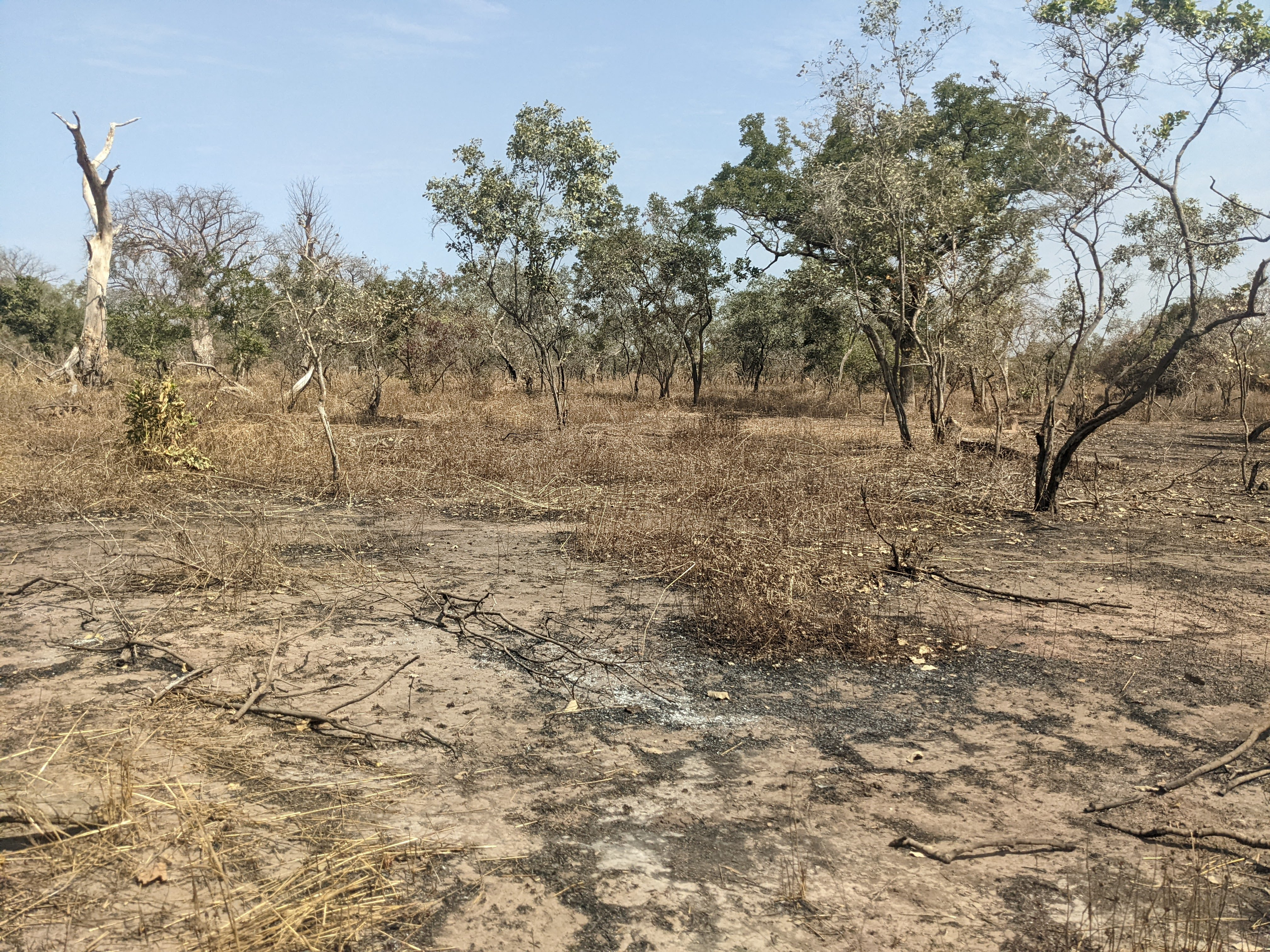
- The bush in Bala Commune

- Location in Senegal
- Coordinates: 14.022°N 13.166°W
- Country: Senegal
- Region: Tambacounda Region
- Department: Goudiry
- Arrondissement: Bala

Area
  - Town and commune: 755.0 km^{2} (291.5 sq mi)

Population (2023 census)
  - Town and commune: 9,799
  - Density: 12.98/km^{2} (33.61/sq mi)
- Time zone: UTC+0 (GMT)

Bala is a town and commune in Tambacounda Region, eastern Senegal. It has a station on the main line of the Dakar–Niger Railway.

== People ==
- Karamokho Ba

== See also ==
- Transport in Senegal
- Railway stations in Senegal
