= Amadou-Mahtar M'Bow University =

University in Senegal

- Université Amadou-Mahtar M'Bow
- Established: 1 December 2022
- Location: Diamniadio, Senegal; 14.73375°N 17.19719°W
- Website: Official website

Amadou-Mahtar M'Bow University is a modern university in Senegal located in Diamniadio. It was inaugurated on 1 December 2022.

== History ==
The university is named after Amadou-Mahtar M'Bow.

Construction began in 2017. The university was inaugurated on 1 December 2022 by the President of the Republic of Senegal, Mr. Macky Sall.

== Infrastructure ==
The university buildings were constructed in partnership with Chinese cooperation.
