= Grande Côte =

Stretch of coastline in Senegal

The Grande Côte is a stretch of coastline in Senegal, running north from the Cap-Vert peninsula of Dakar to the border with Mauritania at St-Louis.

A sandy beach runs along the entire coast, which, unlike the Petite Côte, has few settlements – Kayar and Mboro being exceptions. The last stage of the Dakar Rally used to run along the beach. The coastline is also relatively rich in heavy minerals, with significant amounts of zircon having been discovered in the 2000s.

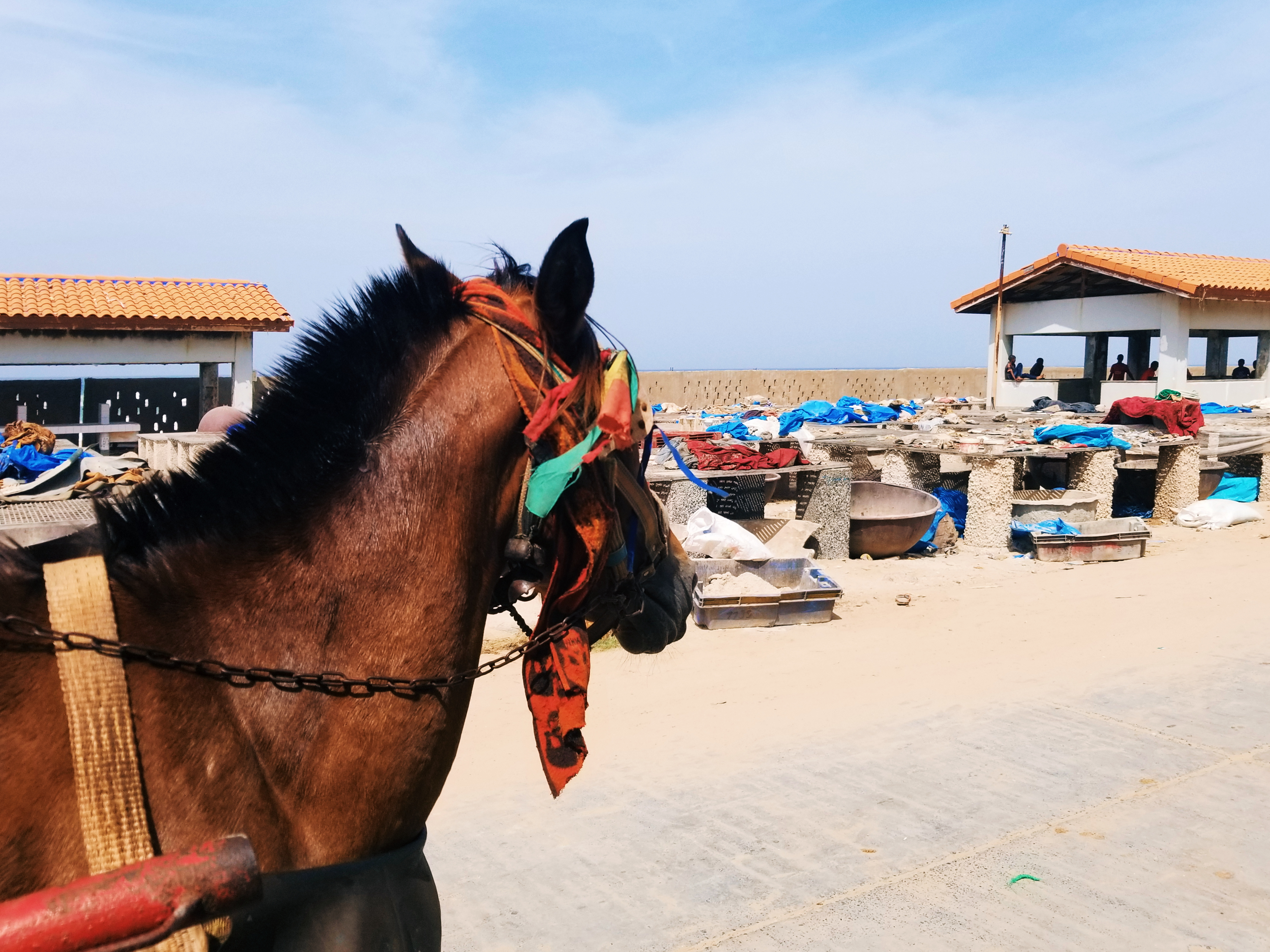
Fish market in Lompoul

== Transport ==
In 2012, a railway branch line was proposed to haul mineral sands. In 2014, Grande Côte Operations began operating trains from its mineral sands extraction project. The newly operated branch line consisted of 22km of new alignment to Mékhé, and the rehabilitation of the existing line from there to Dakar, a distance of around 100km.

== Mineral sands mining ==
The Grande Côte region is the site of a large coastal mineral sands mining operation focused on the extraction of heavy minerals such as zircon, ilmenite, rutile and leucoxene. The project, operated by Grande Côte Operations (a majority-owned subsidiary of the French mining group Eramet with a minority stake held by the Government of Senegal), extracts mineral-rich sands using a mobile dredge system along the Atlantic coast north of Dakar. The extracted heavy mineral sands are processed and exported for industrial use in ceramics, pigments and other products. The mining operation has been active since the mid-2010s and is a significant contributor to Senegal’s mineral industry, but it has also led to environmental degradation and community tensions.

== See also ==
- Railway stations in Senegal
