= Guinguinéo =

- Town and commune
- Location within Senegal
- Coordinates: 14°16′0″N 15°57′0″W
- Senegal: Senegal
- Region: Kaolack
- Département: Guinguinéo

Government
  - Type: City council
  - Mayor: Adja Rokhaya Daba Diouf

Area
  - Town and commune: 8.386 km^{2} (3.238 sq mi)
- Elevation: 9 m (30 ft)

Population (2023 census)
  - Town and commune: 20,340
  - Density: 2,425/km^{2} (6,282/sq mi)
- Time zone: UTC+0 (GMT)
- Website: www.guinguineo-ville.com

Guinguinéo is a township and urban commune in Kaolack Region in the center of Senegal, situated 22 km to the northeast of Kaolack. Before 1956, Guinguinéo experienced the phenomenon of kingdoms piloted by a succession of kings of whom the most famous was Maad Saloum Fode N'Gouye Joof (French: Fodé Diouf). Guinguinéo became a commune in 1956 and a full municipality in 1960. The first mayor was Doctor Charles Ndiaye.

== Transport ==
Guinguinéo is served by a station on the main line of Dakar-Niger Railway and is also the junction for the branch line to Lydiane. However people mainly use the road for their travel because of the poor state of the train system. Guinguinéo occupied for a long time a good position on the railroad in Senegal, being the second station of the rail system after Thies, which is one reason why the town delayed making an asphalted road to join it directly with the other settlements of the country. The only road joining Guinguineo to the rest of Senegal is the small road section from Guinguineo to Back Samba Dior.

In the town itself journeys are made by horse-drawn vehicles or primarily on foot, as Guinguinéo is not well provided with roads.

== Administration ==
The Département of Guinguinéo was established by presidential decree in 2008, severed from the region of Fatick of which it was previously a part. Since its enhancement as a département it has become a part of the region of Kaolack, satisfying a long standing demand of the people. The département is managed by a recently installed Prefect, who was the main organizer of the last local elections. New services have been established such the Inspection of Youth and Sports, Inspection of Breeding, Inspection of Business, Inspection of Education, etc. The municipality is managed by the Mayor, Souleymane Ndéné Ndiaye, who also became the Prime Minister of Senegal on 30 March 2009. Currently the Mayor is bidding for his second mandate.

For its safety and security, Guinguinéo has a gendarmerie brigade and police station which are little used because problems are almost non-existent and disagreements are generally solved by the leaders of districts and the inhabitants themselves. The town of Guinguinéo has seven public elementary schools, one private Catholic school, one nursery school, one which accommodates Toddlers, one high school of general education, one middle school(college) of average education (C.E.M) and one French-Arabic school. In every district also exists a house where the Koran is taught.

== Personalities born in Guinguinéo ==
- Souleymane Ndéné Ndiaye, lawyer, mayor of the Municipality former Prime Minister of Senegal
- Binta Sarr – founder of the Association for the Advancement of Senegalese Women

== See also ==
- Transport in Senegal
- Railway stations in Senegal
- Communes of Senegal
