= Diourbel =

Diourbel ديوربل
- Town and commune
- Location within Senegal
- Coordinates: 14°39′21″N 16°14′04″W
- Country: Senegal
- Region: Diourbel Region
- Department: Diourbel

Area
  - Town and commune: 31.24 km^{2} (12.06 sq mi)
- Elevation: 7.9 m (26 ft)

Population (2023 census)
  - Town and commune: 157,554
  - Density: 5,043/km^{2} (13,060/sq mi)
- Time zone: UTC+00:00 (GMT)

Diourbel (Arabic: ديوربل; Serer: Jurbel, Wolof: Njaaréem) is a town and urban commune in Senegal lying east of Thiès. It is known for its mosque and local groundnut industry and is the capital of the Diourbel Region. The population in 2023 was 157,554.

== Transport ==
Diourbel lies on the N3 road linking it to Dakar and is also served by a junction station on the Dakar-Niger Railway. Both the railway and the N3 cross the River Sine in the town.

== Climate ==
Climate data for Diourbel (1991–2020)
Month	Jan	Feb	Mar	Apr	May	Jun	Jul	Aug	Sep	Oct	Nov	Dec	Year
Mean daily maximum °C (°F)	34.2 (93.6)	36.2 (97.2)	38.6 (101.5)	39.9 (103.8)	40.3 (104.5)	38.4 (101.1)	35.5 (95.9)	34.0 (93.2)	34.2 (93.6)	37.3 (99.1)	37.8 (100.0)	35.3 (95.5)	36.8 (98.2)
Mean daily minimum °C (°F)	15.3 (59.5)	16.9 (62.4)	17.8 (64.0)	18.4 (65.1)	19.9 (67.8)	22.2 (72.0)	23.2 (73.8)	23.1 (73.6)	22.8 (73.0)	22.4 (72.3)	18.8 (65.8)	16.4 (61.5)	19.8 (67.6)
Record low °C (°F)	5.5 (41.9)	8.2 (46.8)	10.0 (50.0)	10.5 (50.9)	12.0 (53.6)	13.4 (56.1)	16.0 (60.8)	14.1 (57.4)	14.5 (58.1)	15.5 (59.9)	10.0 (50.0)	7.0 (44.6)	5.5 (41.9)
Average precipitation mm (inches)	2.2 (0.09)	1.0 (0.04)	0.1 (0.00)	0.0 (0.0)	0.1 (0.00)	22.5 (0.89)	98.0 (3.86)	205.1 (8.07)	164.1 (6.46)	31.4 (1.24)	0.7 (0.03)	1.2 (0.05)	526.4 (20.72)
Average precipitation days (≥ 1.0 mm)	0.2	0.1	0.0	0.0	0.0	1.7	6.6	11.8	10	3.1	0.1	0.1	33.7
Source: NOAA

== Twin towns – sister cities ==
Diourbel is twinned with:

- Avignon, France

== Notable people ==
- Serigne Abdou Ahad Mbacké, the third Mouride caliph, was born in 1914 in Diourbel.
- Seynabou Mbengue (born 1992), Senegalese footballer
- Makhtar N'Diaye, former NBA player
- Mohamed Mbougar Sarr (born 1990), writer and winner of the prestigious prix Goncourt

== See also ==
- Railway stations in Senegal
