= Railway stations in Senegal =

List of Railway stations in Senegal include:

== Maps ==
- UN Map
- Go

== Towns served by rail ==
=== Existing ===
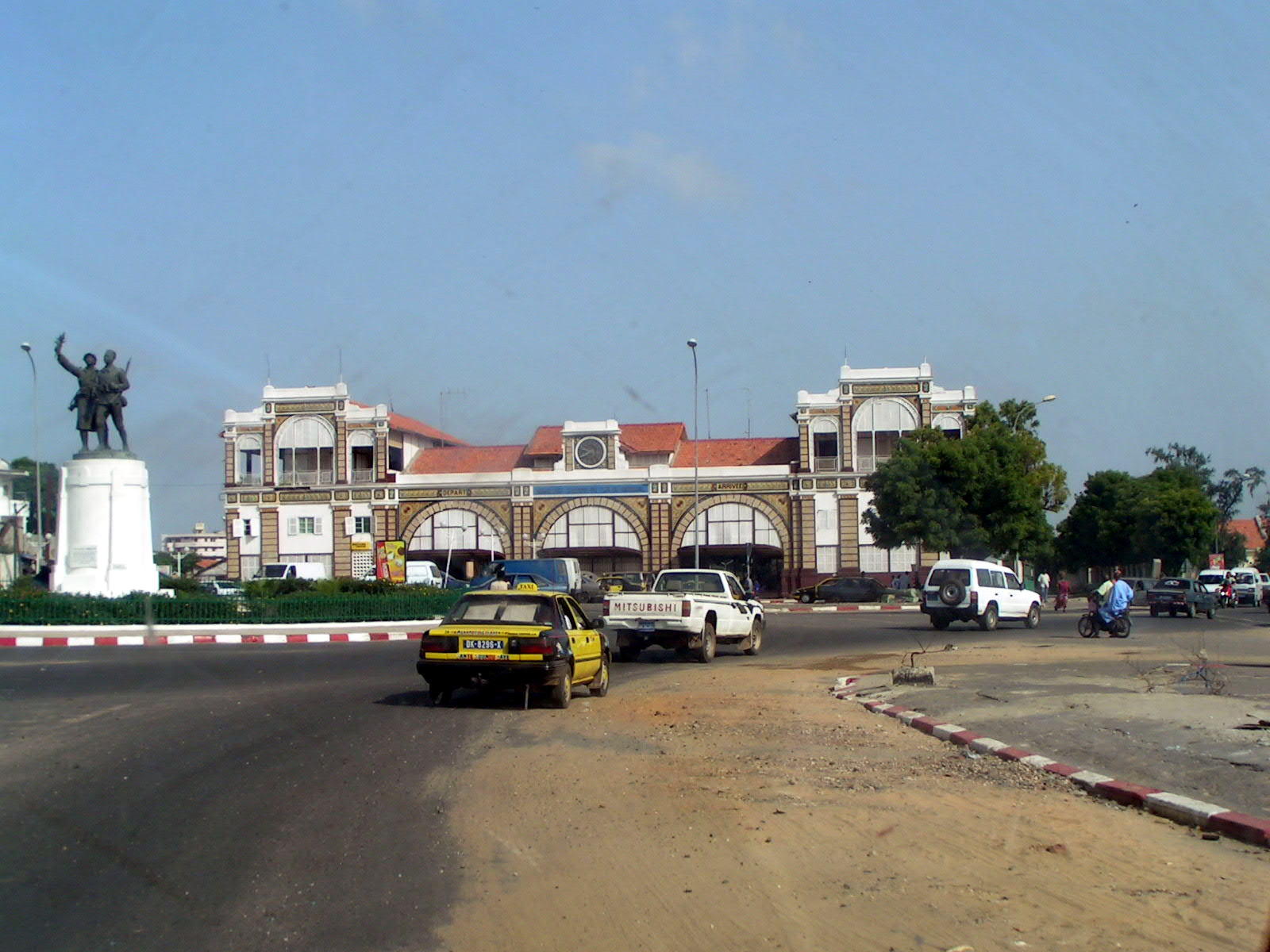
Dakar station

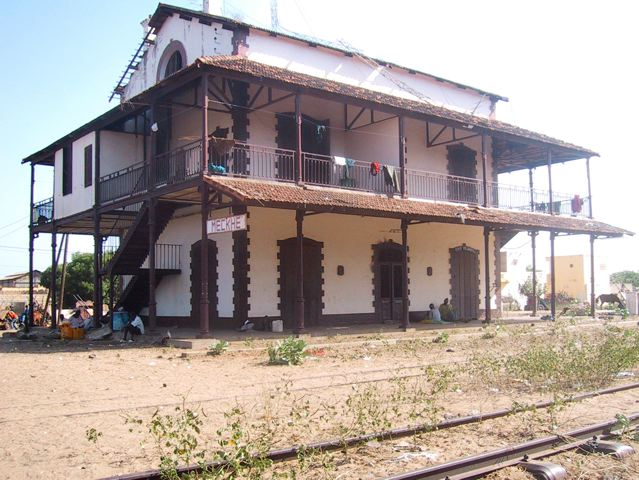
Meckhe station

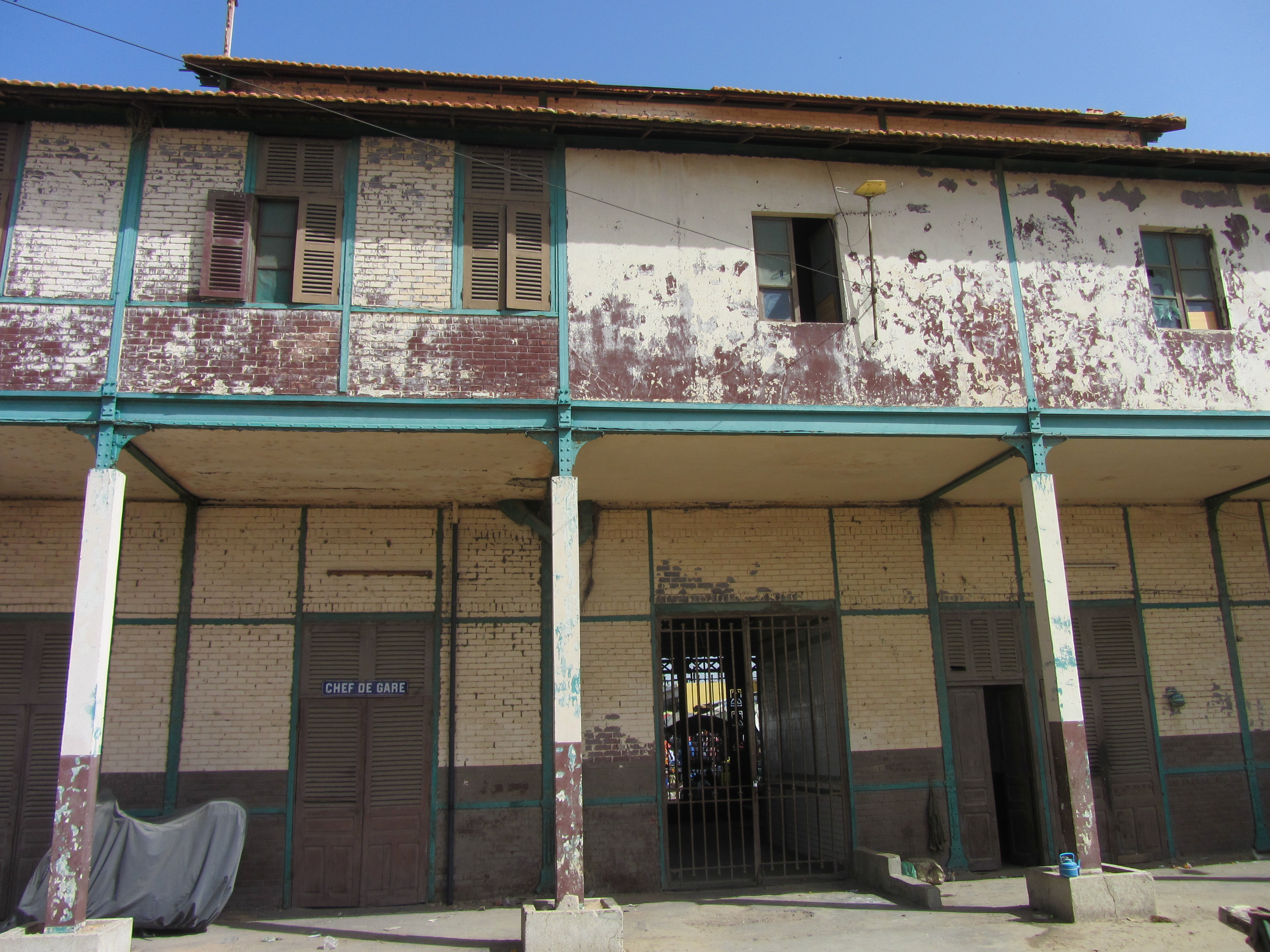
Saint-Louis station

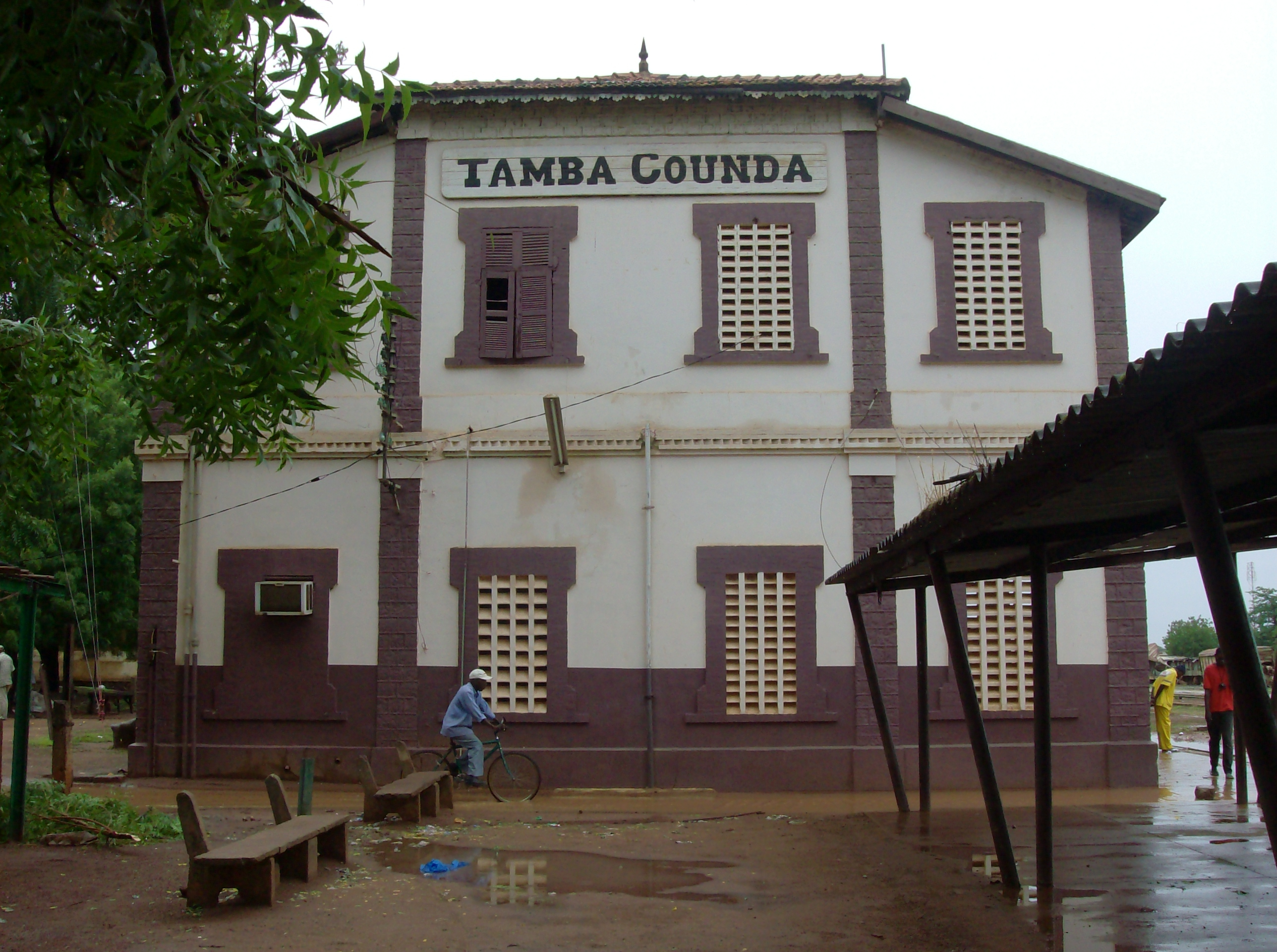
Tambacounda station

- Dakar — port and national capital (0 km)
- Hann — truncated terminus (3 km)
- Bargny — proposed deepwater port.
- Rufisque — cement works

- Kirène — cement works to be expanded in 2008. - nearest station is Thiès about 20 km away.

- Thiès — junction for St-Louis and Linguere; workshops
- Bambey
- Diourbel — junction for Touba, Mbaké
- Gossas
- Guinguinéo — junction for Kaolack and Lydiane
  - Kaolack — provincial capital
  - Lydiane — branch terminus
- Kaffrine
- Niahène
- Koungheul
- Koumpentoum
- Koussanar
- Tambacounda — provincial capital and proposed junction
- Bala
- Goudiry
- (Senegal) Kidira — border with Mali
- Nayé, Senegal — border with Mali
- Kayes, Mali
- Bamako, Mali — national capital - workshops

- Tivouane
- Meckhe
  - Grande Côte — mineral sands
- Louga — junction
- Mpal
- St-Louis
- Thiès — junction for St-Louis
  - Louga — junction
  - Koki
  - Dahra
  - Linguere — railhead

=== Proposed ===
- Ziguinchor

- Tambacounda — provincial capital and proposed junction
- Kédougou — proposed branch terminus

- Dakar and Thiès
- Falémé River — iron mines suspended 2009

- phosphate mines at Matam (17m)

- Transcontinental railway from Dakar to Port Sudan.

- 2012
- Meckhe — junction
- Grande Côte — mineral sands Junction

- 2012
- Diogo

=== Standard Gauge ===
- 2001 Report
- 2010 Report

- (The Gambia) Banjul, Gambia — proposed branch terminus from Guinguinéo via Kaolack (proposed junction)

== See also ==
- Transport in Senegal
- Railway stations in Mali
- AfricaRail – Project to link West African national railway systems
- Train Express Regional
