= Louga =

Town in Louga Region, Senegal

Louga لوجا
- City and commune
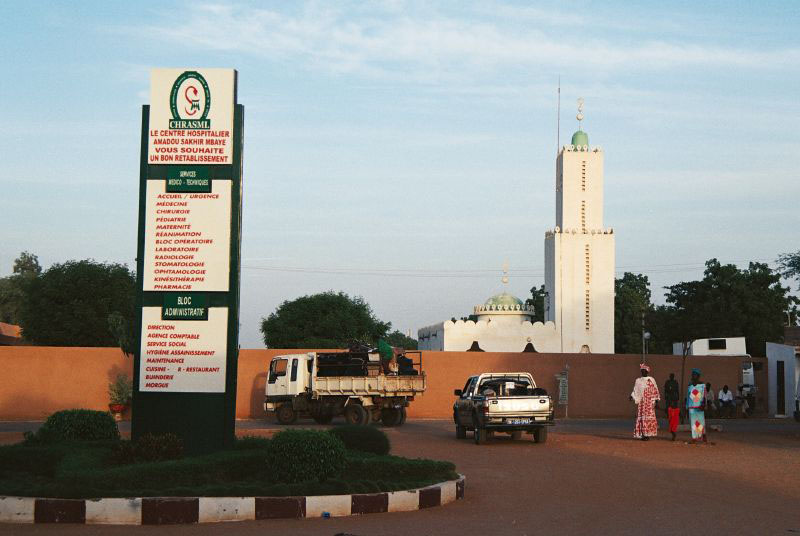
- Amadou Sakhir Mbaye hospital

- Location within Senegal
- Coordinates: 15°37′22″N 16°13′27″W
- Country: Senegal
- Region: Louga
- Department: Louga

Area
  - City and commune: 21.5 km^{2} (8.3 sq mi)

Population (2023 census)
  - City and commune: 113,365
  - Density: 5,270/km^{2} (13,700/sq mi)
- Time zone: UTC+0 (GMT)

Louga (Arabic: لوجا; Wolof: Luga) is a city in northwestern Senegal. Louga is a cattle market centre, and has road and rail links with the port city of Saint-Louis to the northwest and Dakar to the southwest. The area surrounding Louga is at the northern limits of Senegal's peanut- (groundnut-) growing area and is inhabited by the Fulani, who are generally pastoral nomads, and the Wolof, who are sedentary farmers. Louga is located in what is called the Ndiambour, which used to be part of the Cayor province.

In 2023, according to official figures from the National Agency for Statistics and Demography (ANSD), Louga had a population of 113,365 inhabitants.

== Administration ==
Louga is both the capital of the Louga department and of the Louga region.

The administrative region of Louga was formed in 1976, divided into 3 departments with 11 districts and 48 communities. There are 7 municipalities.

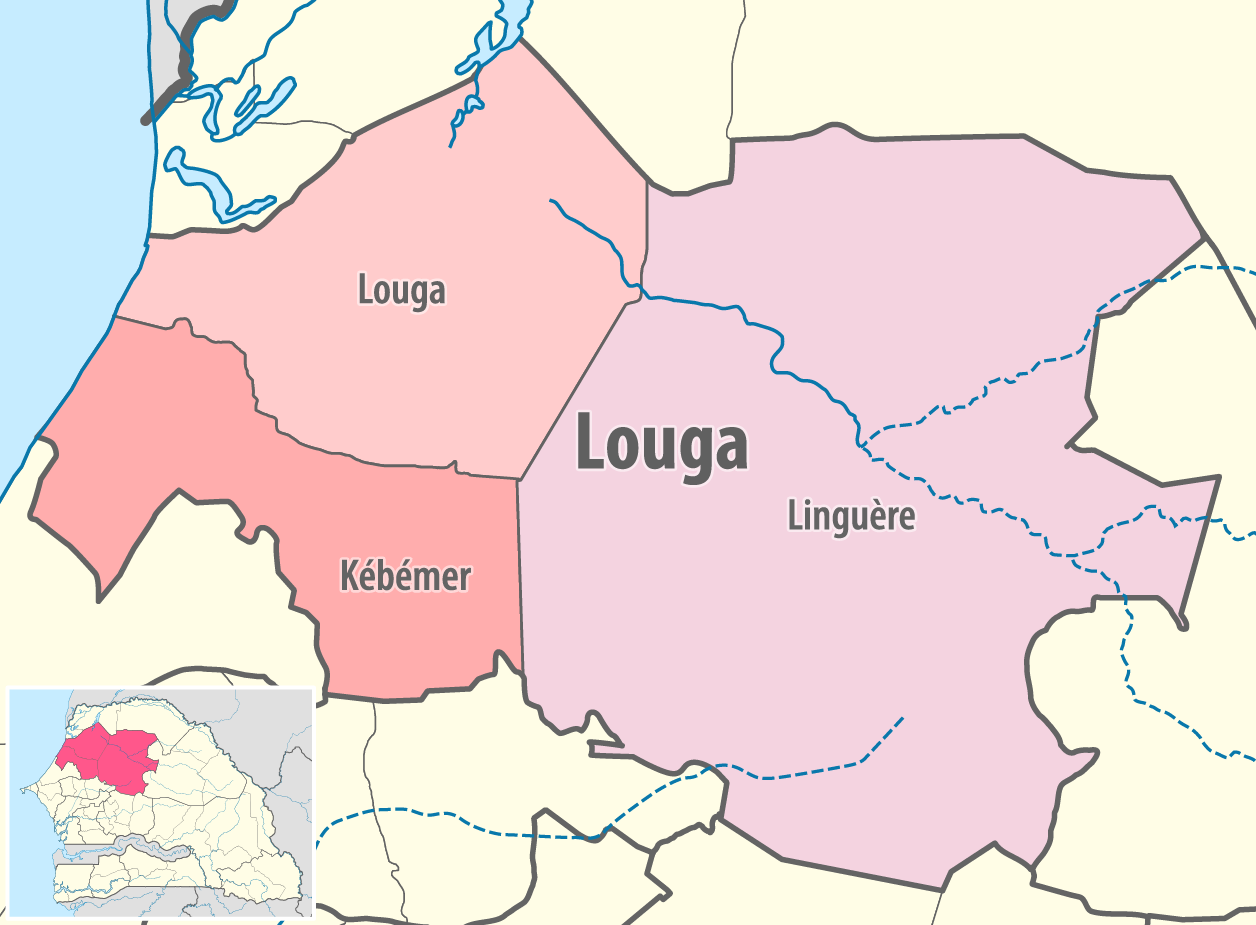
The 3 departments of the Louga region

The Louga region is made up of 3 departments:

- Louga
- Kebemer
- Linguere

== Geography ==
The closest towns are Dagadj, Bayakh, Taoua, Laye, Mbarom and Ngueye Dili. The capital of Senegal, Dakar, is 203 km away. The climate is dry, almost desertlike, with a long dry season called the harmattan that can last 9 months or more. This season carries dust to Louga and occasionally causes sandstorms, promoting wind erosion and water loss by evaporation.

=== Population ===
The main ethnic groups are the Wolof, the Fula, the Toucouleur, and the Moors.

=== Economy ===
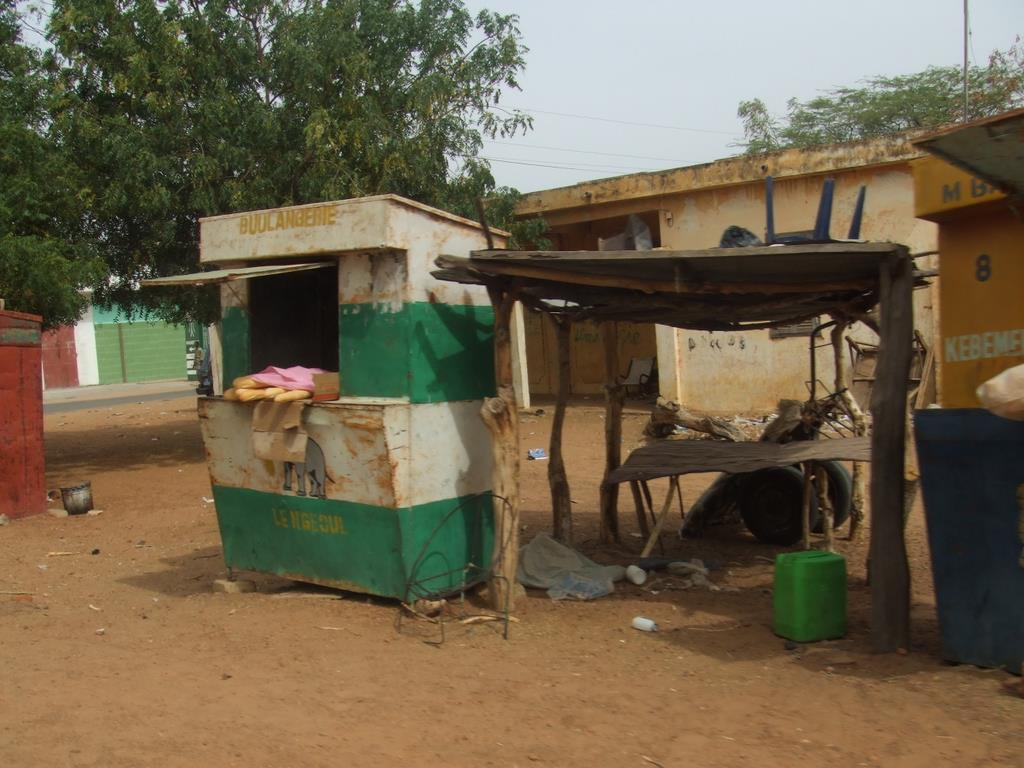
A bread shop in Louga

Agriculture is the main sector of Louga's economy. Fishing is practiced on the 50 km sea front in Potou.

== Climate ==
Louga, with year-round hot weather, has a hot desert climate (Köppen: BWh). Louga has a mildly rainy wet season from July to October, while the period from November to May has very little precipitation.

Climate data for Louga (1991–2020)
Month	Jan	Feb	Mar	Apr	May	Jun	Jul	Aug	Sep	Oct	Nov	Dec	Year
Mean daily maximum °C (°F)	32.5 (90.5)	34.2 (93.6)	36.3 (97.3)	37.1 (98.8)	36.9 (98.4)	35.6 (96.1)	34.2 (93.6)	33.7 (92.7)	34.2 (93.6)	37.0 (98.6)	36.5 (97.7)	33.5 (92.3)	35.1 (95.2)
Mean daily minimum °C (°F)	17.1 (62.8)	18.0 (64.4)	18.8 (65.8)	19.1 (66.4)	20.3 (68.5)	22.7 (72.9)	24.4 (75.9)	24.7 (76.5)	24.5 (76.1)	23.9 (75.0)	21.0 (69.8)	18.4 (65.1)	21.1 (70.0)
Average precipitation mm (inches)	0.0 (0.0)	0.8 (0.03)	0.5 (0.02)	0.0 (0.0)	0.1 (0.00)	10.5 (0.41)	52.7 (2.07)	133.3 (5.25)	96.7 (3.81)	27.2 (1.07)	1.1 (0.04)	0.3 (0.01)	323.2 (12.72)
Average precipitation days (≥ 1.0 mm)	0.0	0.2	0.0	0.0	0.1	0.9	4.0	8.4	7.7	2.2	0.1	0.0	23.6
Source: NOAA

== Transport ==
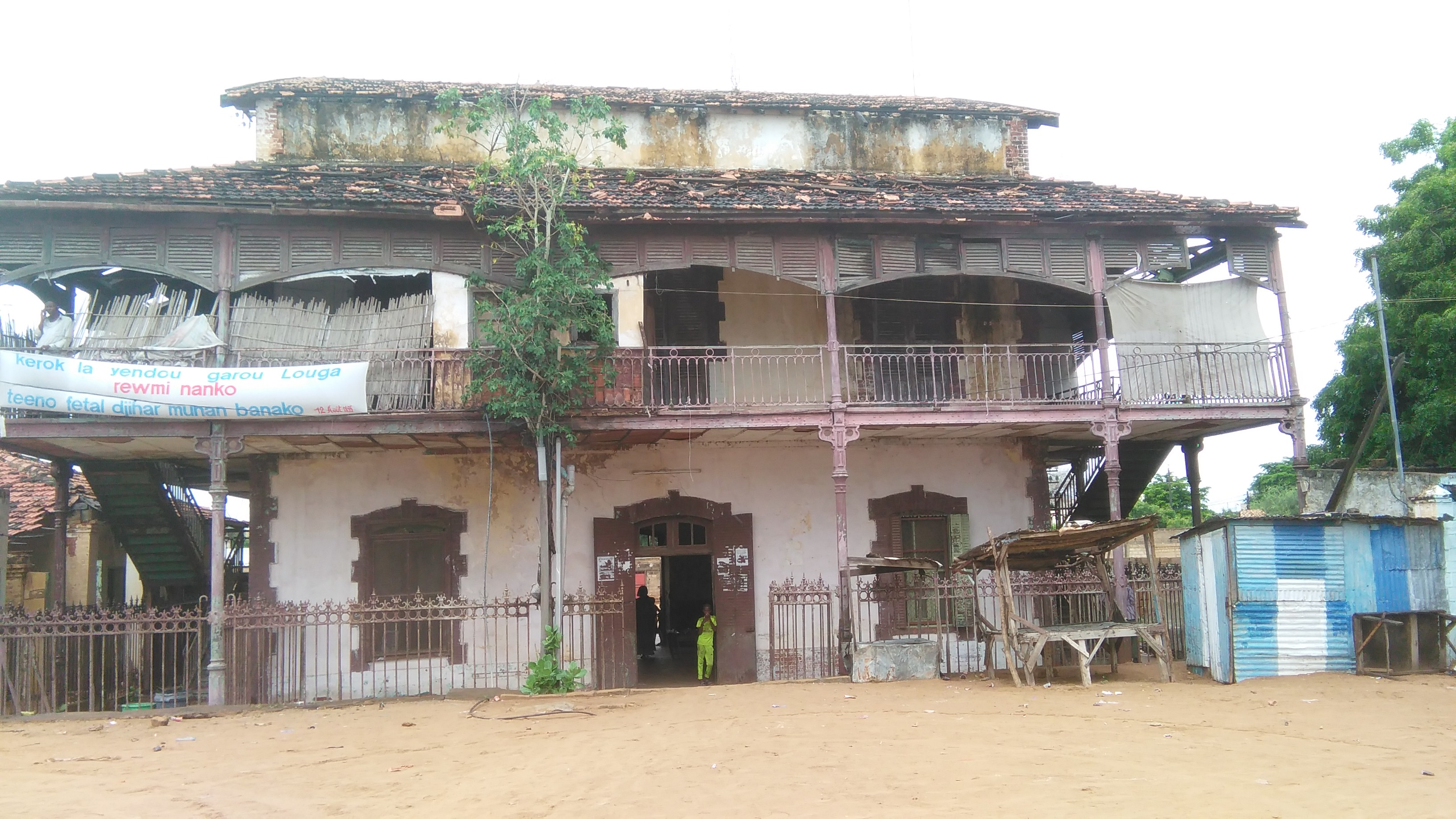
Former Louga train station (2017).

Louga is a junction station on the Dakar-Niger Railway network.

== Sports ==
Stade Alboury Ndiaye, is a multi-use stadium. It is currently used mostly for football matches and serves as a home ground of ASAC Ndiambour. The stadium holds 3,000 people.

== Twin Towns ==
- Millau, France

== Notable People Born in Louga ==
- Momar Gaye Diop, first mayor of Louga in 1956
- Mansour Bouna Ndiaye, former deputy mayor of Louga
- Abdou Diouf, former president of Senegal (1981-2000)
- Abass Sall
- Sam Mbaye (1924-1998), son of Mame Cheikh Mbaye, Islamologist
- Djily Mbaye (1927-1991), also son of Mame Cheikh Mbaye, marabout, patron, and builder of the major infrastructures of Louga
- Badou Ndiaye, guitarist, former conductor of the Etoile de Dakar
- Oustaz Cheikh Tidiane Gaye (1951-2011), Islamologist, Arabic-speaking writer and lecturer
- Ahmadou Sakhir Lô (1903-1988), founder of the Islamic institute of Coki founded in 1939
- Khalifa Sall, former mayor of Dakar
- Aminata Mbengue Ndiaye, mayor of Louga from 2009 to 2014
- Moustapha Diop, current mayor of Louga since 2014
- Samba Khary Cissé, current president of the regional council
- Chérif Thiam, painter
- Haïdar El Ali, Minister of Ecology and Nature Protection
- Mubarack Lô, economist and politician
- Modou Mbery Sylla
- Pope Momar Gaye, accountant
- Oustaz Ahmad Moubarack LO, founder of Manar Al Houda

== See also ==
- Railway stations in Senegal
