= Diamniadio =

Town in Senegal

- Town and commune
- Location in Senegal
- Coordinates: 14°43′19″N 17°10′44″W
- Country: Senegal
- Region: Dakar
- Department: Rufisque

Area
  - Town and commune: 72.6 km^{2} (28.0 sq mi)

Population (2023 census)
  - Town and commune: 47,759
  - Density: 658/km^{2} (1,700/sq mi)
- Time zone: UTC+0 (GMT)

Diamniadio is a town and urban commune in Senegal.

== History ==
Diamniadio is a part of the collective development program of the government of Senegal under the leadership of President Macky Sall to revitalize Senegal's economy. The development of the new city is taking place around 30 km from Dakar, close to the Blaise Diagne International Airport, which opened in December 2017. The Diamniadio Lake City is one of its suburbs.

The idea behind the development is to ease the population pressure on Dakar. On completion, the new city will be connected to Dakar through a 32 km express highway, which will reduce the travel time from 90 minutes to an average of 30 minutes.

After visiting in November 2017, the minister in charge of the project, Cheikh Kanté, described the site as "80% completed". The first residential areas had been completed, as had several hotels initially serving the new airport. Manufacturing areas, the Amadou-Mahtar-Mbow University, and the planned railway station, part of the Train Express Regional, are facing delays.

== Population ==
According to the official estimates of 2007, the population of Diamniadio was 12,326. Upon completion of the Diamniadio Lake City, the government is expecting that around 300,000 of the population will move to the new city.

== Transport ==
The new city is connected to Dakar by a 32 km toll highway, which initially reduced travel time from 90 minutes to 15–30.

Diamniadio is also connected to Dakar by a new railway line, the Train Express Regional, which ran its first train in December 2021 and is a part of the link between Dakar and Blaise Diagne International Airport.

== Government and infrastructure ==
The head office of the Ministry of Infrastructure, Land Transport and Opening Up is in Diamniadio.

== Education ==
- Amadou-Mahtar M'Bow University (2022)
