= Train Express Régional Dakar =

Rail line in Senegal

Train Express Régional
- Logo of the TER system

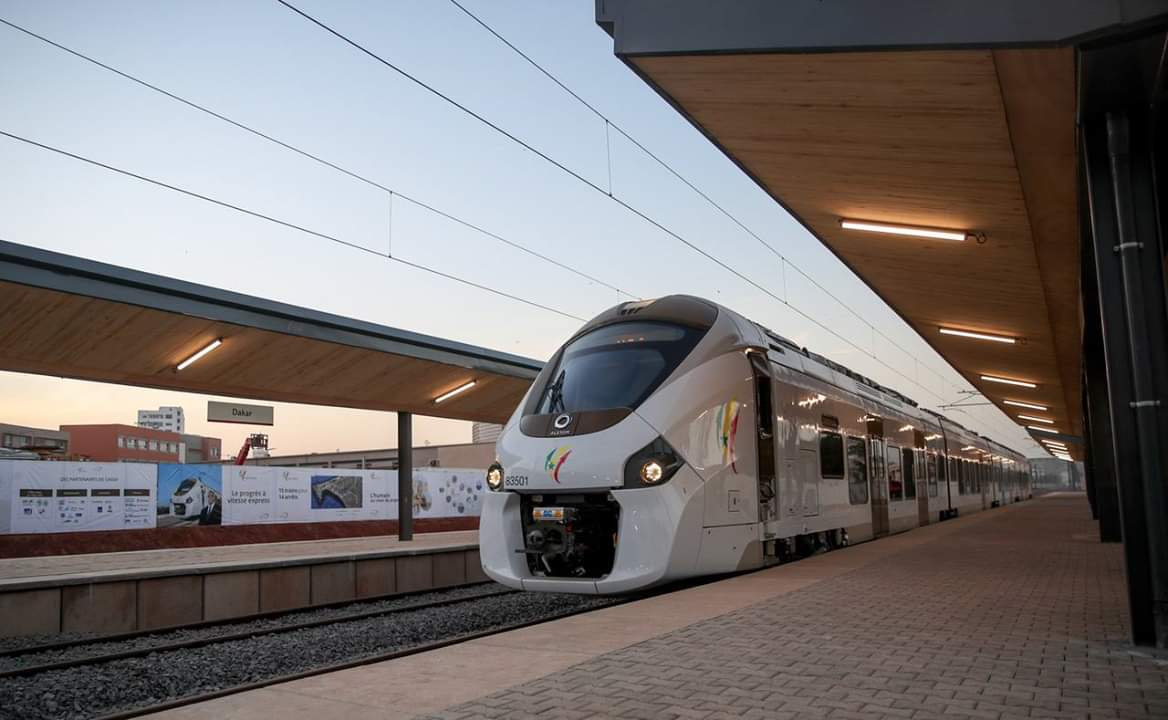
- The TER at Dakar station

Overview
- Locale: Dakar, Senegal
- Transit type: Commuter rail, airport rail link
- Number of lines: 1
- Number of stations: 14
- Daily ridership: 80,000 (2025)
- Website: https://www.terdakar.sn/

Operation
- Began operation: 27 December 2021 (Phase 1); 28 September 2026 (Phase 2)
- Operator: SETER
- Number of vehicles: 22

Technical
- System length: 55 km (34 mi)
- Track gauge: 1,435 mm (4 ft 8 1/2 in) standard gauge
- Electrification: 25 kV 50 Hz AC overhead line
- Top speed: 160 km/h (99 mph)
System map

The Train Express Régional (TER) is a commuter rail line and airport rail link in Senegal connecting Dakar with Blaise Diagne International Airport (AIBD). The first 36 km (22 mi) section between Dakar and Diamniadio opened for service in December 2021. A 19 km (12 mi) extension from Diamniadio to the airport opened in September 2026, bringing the total length of the line to 55 km (34 mi).

== History ==
Construction of the TER began in the third quarter of 2016.

The line was developed in two stages, with the first covering 36 km (22 mi) from Dakar to Diamniadio and the second adding 19 km (12 mi) to the airport.

=== Phase 1 ===
For Phase 1, Engie and Thales were responsible for rail systems, while Eiffage, Yapı Merkezi and La Compagnie Sahélienne d'Entreprise (CSE Group) were responsible for construction. Station works were contracted to Eiffage, SERTEM and CSE Group. Project management was provided by Systra.

The first phase was formally handed over at a ceremony attended by President Macky Sall on 14 January 2019, although passenger services had not yet begun.

For the first phase, Alstom was awarded a contract in December 2016 to supply 15 Coradia Polyvalent trainsets. Manufacturing at Alstom's Reichshoffen site in France was scheduled to begin in 2017. Regular passenger service between Dakar and Diamniadio began on 27 December 2021.

Phase 1 was initially estimated to cost €866.89 million, financed by the Islamic Development Bank (€300 million), the Government of Senegal (€187.72 million), the African Development Bank (€182.94 million), the French Development Agency (AFD; €100 million) and the French Treasury (€96.24 million). AFD later reported a total Phase 1 investment of about 686 billion CFA francs (around €1 billion), with its own financing increased to €230 million.

=== Phase 2 ===
The second phase extended the line by 19 km (12 mi) from Diamniadio to Blaise Diagne International Airport. Work on the extension began on 5 March 2022. Civil works were undertaken by a consortium of Eiffage, Yapı Merkezi and CSE Group. Infrastructure and project management were handled by Setec, while Engie and Thales were responsible for the rail systems.

In 2023, CAF received an order for seven additional Coradia Polyvalent trainsets for Senegal. The order was among the first for the platform after CAF acquired the Coradia Polyvalent platform and the Reichshoffen manufacturing plant from Alstom in 2022. The first of the additional trainsets arrived in Dakar in October 2024.

Phase 2 began operations on 28 September 2026. The extension consists of 19 km (12 mi) of double-track electrified railway and includes a new station at the airport, bringing the total length of the TER to 55 km (34 mi). Seven additional bi-mode trainsets increased the fleet from 15 to 22. Travel on the new Diamniadio–AIBD section was made free for one week from its opening.

The cost of Phase 2 rose from an initial estimate of about 208 billion CFA francs to around 276 billion CFA francs during implementation, partly due to additional works, while the government described total investment at inauguration as more than 300 billion CFA francs. Financing included €140.25 million from the Islamic Development Bank, US$74 million from the African Development Bank, US$50 million from the Arab Bank for Economic Development in Africa, 35 billion CFA francs from the West African Development Bank, and a subsequent €150 million French financing package.

=== Future expansion ===
Construction of a new TER station and footbridge at Sébikotane was officially launched on 20 June 2026. Longer-term expansion of the TER has also been proposed towards Thiès and M'bour.

== Infrastructure ==
The line uses ETCS Level 2 signalling and GSM-R for communications.

The original Dakar–Diamniadio section has 13 stations: Dakar, Colobane, Hann, Dalifort, Baux-Maraîchers, Pikine, Thiaroye, Yeumbeul, Keur Mbaye Fall, PNR, Rufisque, Bargny and Diamniadio. The Phase 2 extension added Blaise Diagne International Airport as the 14th operational station. The present Dakar railway station dates from 1914. After falling into disuse, the historic station building was rehabilitated and extended as part of the TER project, with the work completed in 2019.

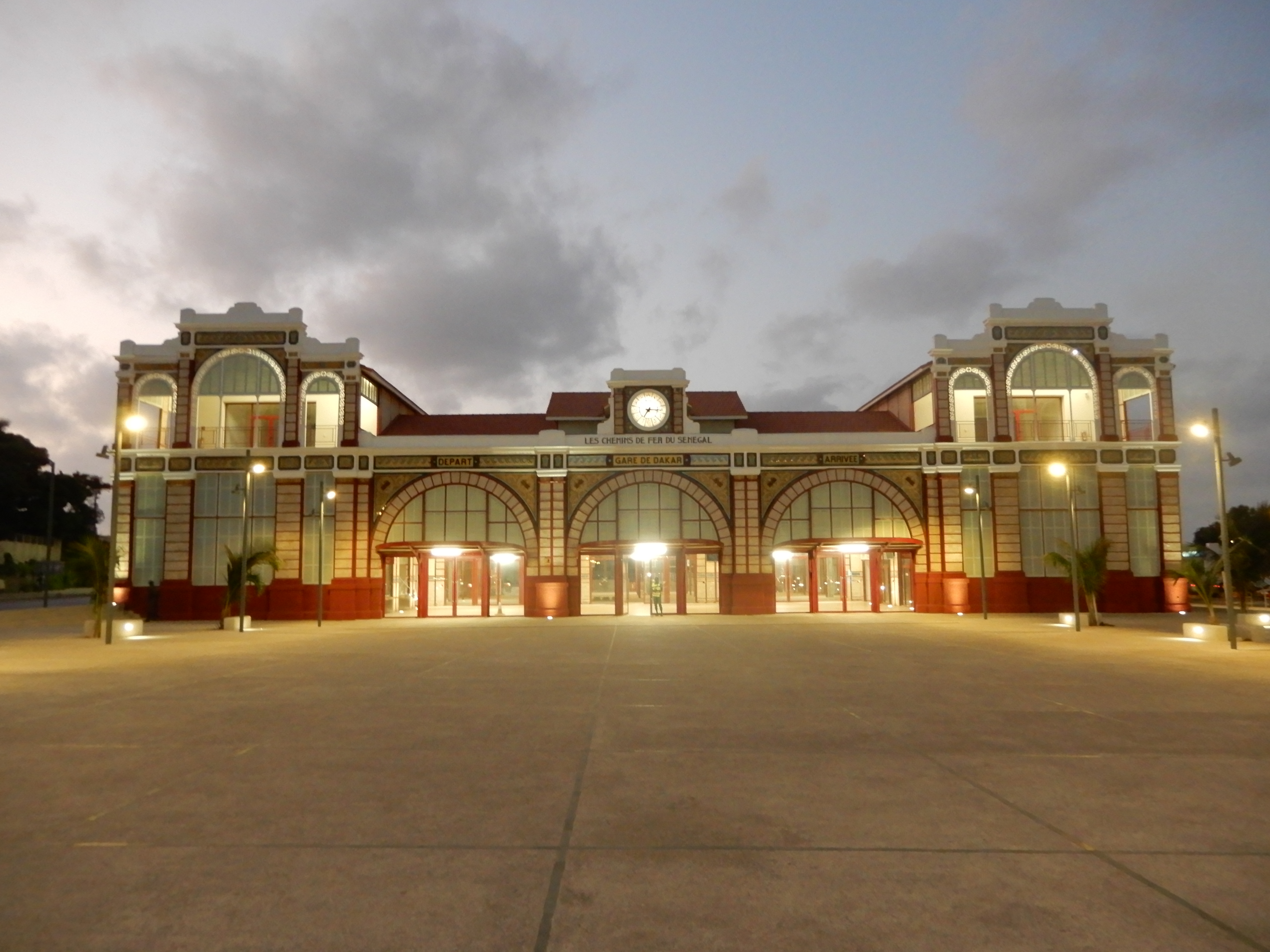
Dakar railway station

The system has an infrastructure maintenance site in Rufisque and a rolling-stock maintenance site in Colobane. Provision was made for the installation of four additional tracks.

The TER is Senegal's first electrified railway and its first standard gauge railway; the country's pre-existing railway network was predominantly metre gauge.

=== Rolling stock ===
The fleet consists of 22 four-car Coradia Polyvalent trainsets, comprising the original 15 units and seven additional bi-mode trainsets acquired for Phase 2. The trainsets are mainline dual-mode trains capable of operating under 25 kV AC electrification or using diesel power, with a maximum speed of 160 km/h (99 mph). Each trainset is 72 m (236 ft) long and has a maximum capacity of 531 passengers in first and second class.

== Operation ==
The TER is operated and maintained by SETER, while SENTER is responsible for management of TER assets. SETER employed about 950 people in 2022. SETER is a subsidiary of the SNCF group. The Senegalese state acquired a 34% stake in SETER in 2023.

At the opening of Phase 2 in September 2026, the TER had carried more than 100 million passengers since operations began. In 2024, the TER carried 22,592,847 passengers.

In 2025, the government stated that the TER required annual public compensation of approximately 15–18 billion CFA francs to cover its operating shortfall.

Following the opening of Phase 2, trains operate approximately every eight minutes between Dakar and Diamniadio and every 24 minutes between Diamniadio and Blaise Diagne International Airport. The journey between Dakar and the airport takes approximately 55 minutes.

=== Fares ===
The Dakar–Diamniadio section is divided into three fare zones, with zone 1 from Dakar to Thiaroye, zone 2 from Thiaroye to Bargny and zone 3 from Bargny to Diamniadio. Second-class single fares are based on the number of zones crossed:

- One zone: 500 CFA francs
- Two zones: 1,000 CFA francs
- Three zones: 1,500 CFA francs
- First class: 2,500 CFA francs regardless of the number of zones crossed

Travel is free for children under five years old. Multi-journey tickets and subscription products, including youth and children's subscriptions, are also offered.

For journeys between Dakar and Blaise Diagne International Airport, the fare introduced with the opening of the extension was 4,000 CFA francs in second class and 7,500 CFA francs in first class.

== See also ==
- Rail transport in Senegal
- Transport express régional
