= Diass Solar Power Station =

Solar power station in Senegal

- Country: Senegal
- Location: Diass, M'bour Department, Thiès Region
- Coordinates: 14°39′10″N 17°06′11″W
- Status: Operational
- Commission date: 22 May 2022
- Construction cost: €20 Million
- Owner: Senelec
- Operator: Senelec

Solar farm
- Type: Flat-panel PV
- Site area: 40 hectares (99 acres)

Power generation
- Units planned: 85248
- Nameplate capacity: 23 MW (31,000 hp)

The Diass Power Station (French: Centrale solaire de Diass) is a 23 MW (31,000 hp) solar power plant in Senegal. The power station was commissioned on 22 May 2022 by the President of Senegal Macky Sall and his guest Olaf Scholz, the Chancellor of Germany. The solar farm is owned and operated by Société nationale d'électricité du Sénégal (Senelec), the national public electricity utility parastatal company. The power station was constructed with loan financing from the German Development Bank. Senelec integrates the energy from this renewable energy source into the Senegalese national electricity grid.

== Location ==
The power station is located on a 40 hectares (99 acres) piece of land in the settlement of Diass (also Ndiass), in M'bour Department, in the Thiès Region of Senegal. This is approximately 54 kilometres (34 mi), by road, southeast of Dakar, the national capital and largest city in that country. The geographical coordinates of the Diass Solar Farm are:14°39'10.0"N, 17°06'11.0"W (Latitude:14.652778; Longitude:-17.103056).

== Overview ==
In May 2022, Senegal's installed generation capacity was reported as 1,555 MW. At that time, the majority of electricity sources were from non-renewable fossil-fuel, with solar accounting for only 112 MW. This power station is part of the national plan to diversify the country's generation mix.

The solar park comprises 85,248 photovoltaic modules, eight inverters and sixteen transformers. High voltage transmission wires transmit the energy to a Senelec substation in Kael, where the energy is integrated into the national grid.

== Funding ==
The power station is reported to have cost €20 million to construct. KfW of Germany loaned a portion of that total to the government of Senegal.

== See also ==
- List of power stations in Senegal
- Niakhar Solar Power Station
