= List of power stations in Senegal =

This article lists all power stations in Senegal. In 2012, 85 percent of Senegal's energy came from oil and diesel-fired plants, 11 percent from hydroelectric power and 3 percent from gas.

== Thermal ==
Thermal power station	Community	Coordinates	Fuel type	Capacity	Completed	Owner	Notes
Dakar C1 Thermal Power Station	Dakar		Diesel	9 MW		Senelec	
Dakar C2 Thermal Power Station	Dakar		Coal	86.2 MW		Senelec	
Dakar C3 Thermal Power Station	Dakar		Coal	148 MW		Senelec	
Dakar C4 Thermal Power Station	Dakar		Coal	95 MW		Senelec	
Dakar C5 Thermal Power Station	Dakar		Coal	12 MW		Senelec	
Ndar Thermal Power Station	Ndar		Coal	7.2 MW		Senelec	
Kahone Thermal Power Station	Kaolack		Coal	102 MW	2006	Senelec/Wartsila	
Boutoute Thermal Power Station	Ziguinchor		Coal	14 MW		Senelec	
Tambacounda Thermal Power Station	Tambacounda		Coal	6 MW		Senelec	
Bel Air Thermal Power Station	Hann Bel-Air, Dakar	14.7102°N 17.4350°W	Coal	102 MW	2005	Senelec/Wartsila	
Sendou Thermal Power Station	Sendou	14.6939°N 17.2336°W	Coal	125 MW		[Nordic Power Sweden and Local Senegalese Minorities]	Completed and in talks for gas conversion

== Wind ==
Wind farm	Community	Coordinates	Capacity	Year completed	Owner	Notes
Taiba N'Diaye Wind Power Station	Taiba N'Diaye	15°02′58″N 16°52′52″W	158.7 MW	2020	Lekela	Operational

== See also ==
- List of power stations in Africa
- List of largest power stations in the world
- Energy in Senegal
