= Niakhar Solar Power Station =

Solar power station in Senegal

- Country: Senegal
- Location: Niakhar, Fatick Department, Fatick Region
- Coordinates: 14°29′13″N 16°20′10″W
- Status: Proposed
- Construction began: 2022 Expected
- Commission date: 2023 Expected
- Construction cost: US$40 Million

Solar farm
- Type: Flat-panel PV

Power generation
- Nameplate capacity: 30 MW (40,000 hp)

The Niakhar Power Station is a proposed 30 MW (40,000 hp) solar power plant in Senegal. The solar farm is under development by Energy Resources Senegal (ERS), a supplier of solar panels and Climate Fund Managers (CFM), an independent fund manager based in South Africa. The plan calls for an attached battery energy storage system rated at 15MW/45MWh. Th energy generated here will be sold to Société nationale d'électricité du Sénégal (Senelec), for integration into the national grid.

== Location ==
The power station would be located in Niakhar, in the Fatick Department of the Fatick Region of Senegal. Niakhar is located approximately 17 kilometres (11 mi), north of Fatick, the regional headquarters and nearest large town. This is about 152 kilometres (94 mi), southeast of Dakar, the capital and largest city of Senegal.

== Overview ==
In May 2022, Senegal's installed generation capacity was reported as 1,555 MW. At that time, the majority of electricity sources were from non-renewable fossil-fuel, with solar accounting for only 112 MW. This power station is part of the national plan to diversify the country's generation mix and reduce over-reliance of fossil-fuel sources.

The solar farm will have an attached battery energy storage system rated between 15MWh to 45MWh. The energy from this power station is enough to supply an estimated 150,000 Senegalese people.

== Developers ==
The power station is owned and under development by an SPV company called Teranga Niakhar Storage (TNS). TNS is a 100 percent subsidiary of Energy Resources Senegal (ERS), a renewable energy developer 49 percent owned by a Senegalese investor and 51 percent by Senelec.

== Funding ==
The power station was reported to cost an estimated US$40 million to construct. In September 2023, the West African Development Bank (BOAD) approved a loan worth €22.8 million to Teranga Niakhar Storage, the special vehicle company (SPV) that owns and is developing the power station. Climate Fund Managers (CFM), is a co-funder on this project.

== See also ==
- List of power stations in Senegal
- Diass Solar Power Station
