= Taiba N'Diaye Wind Power Station =

Senegalese wind power station

- Country: Senegal
- Location: Taiba N'Diaye
- Coordinates: 15°02′58″N 16°52′52″W
- Status: Operational
- Construction began: 2019
- Commission date: 2021
- Owner: Infinity Power

Power generation
- Nameplate capacity: 158.7 MW (212,800 hp)

Taiba N'Diaye Wind Power Station (French: Parc Eolien Taiba N’Diaye, PETN) is a 158.7 MW (212,800 hp) wind power plant in Senegal. The power station is the largest wind power station in West Africa, by generation capacity.

== Location ==
The power station is located in the village of Taiba N'Diaye, approximately 108 kilometres (67 mi), northeast of the city of Dakar, the capital of Senegal. The wind farm occupies 40 hectares (99 acres), in a semi-arid region of the country.

== Overview ==
The wind farm consists of 46 Vestas V126 turbines, each with rated capacity of 3.45MW. The turbines were installed in five rows spread over 7 hectares (17 acres). Each turbine is mounted on a tubular steel tower measuring 117 metres (384 ft) high and weighing 313 tonnes (308 long tons; 345 short tons).

== Development ==
The power station is owned and operated by Lekela, a British renewable energy development company, focusing on Africa. The power generated is sold to Senegal National Electricity Company (Senelec), for integration in the national electricity grid. Senelec will purchase the power for 20 years from plant commissioning, according to the power purchase agreement (PPA) for the Taiba N’Diaye wind power project, signed in 2013. Upon completion, the 158.7 megawatts generated, increased Senegal's generation capacity by 15 percent.

The electricity generated by each turbine is transmitted through underground cables at 33kV, to the existing Tobene substation located 700 metres (2,300 ft), from the closest turbine of the wind farm. At the substation, the electricity is stepped-up to 225kV. There is no need for a high voltage transmission line. The Tobene substation acts as the project substation as well as the grid connection point.

The estimated 400GWh generated annually at this power station supplies an estimated 2 million customers and mitigates an estimated 300,000 tonnes of carbon dioxide emissions annually.

== Construction ==
In 2018, Vestas, a Danish wind turbine manufacturer, installer and servicer, was awarded the engineering, procurement, and construction (EPC) contract for the 46 turbines of this power station. The contract included supply, transportation and installation of the wind turbines. In addition, it included operations and maintenance for 20 years. The contract for the environmental and social impact assessment (ESIA) of the Taiba N’Diaye wind power project, was awarded to Rambøll.

Construction, which was ongoing as of January 2020, was in three phases:

Phase One
This involved the installation of 16 wind turbines, with generation capacity of 55.2 megawatts. This phase was completed in December 2019. This phase was commissioned in February 2020.
Phase Two
This involved the installation of another 16 wind turbines, with generation capacity of 55.2 megawatts. This phase was expected to conclude in the 3rd quarter of 2020.
Phase Three
This involved the installation of the final 14 wind turbines, with generation capacity of 48.3 megawatts. This phase started after the second phase and was expected to conclude in the 4th quarter of 2020.

The fully completed wind farm with generation capacity of 158.7 megawatts, reached commercial commissioning in December 2021.

== Costs and funding ==
The Overseas Private Investment Corporation (OPIC), of the United States, committed $250 million in financing and $70 million in reinsurance for the wind power project, as early as September 2016. In August 2018, the Danish Export Credit Agency (EKF) also guaranteed an export loan facility for the project, worth €140 million (US$161 million). Political risk insurance was provided by the Multilateral Investment Guarantee Agency (MIGA). Power Africa of the United States Agency for International Development (USAID), also contributed to the development of this project.

== Energy storage ==
In May 2021, Lekela selected the Danish firm DNV, to carry out the feasibility studies for a 40 megawatt storage facility, on-site at its Taiba N'Diaye Wind Farm. The storage facility will comprise batteries housed in 47 shipping containers, each measuring 40 feet (12 m) long. The storage system is intended to "store 175 MWh of electricity, enough to stabilize the national grid of Senelec, the Senegalese national electricity company".

== Expansion ==
In December 2021, Afrik21.africa reported that Lekela had received a grant from the U.S. International Development Finance Corporation (DFC), to carry out feasibility studies, with a view to add another 100 megawatts to the existing wind farm. The feasibility studies will inform the size of the expansion, which will include additional battery energy storage.

== See also ==
- List of power stations in Senegal
