= Energy in Senegal =

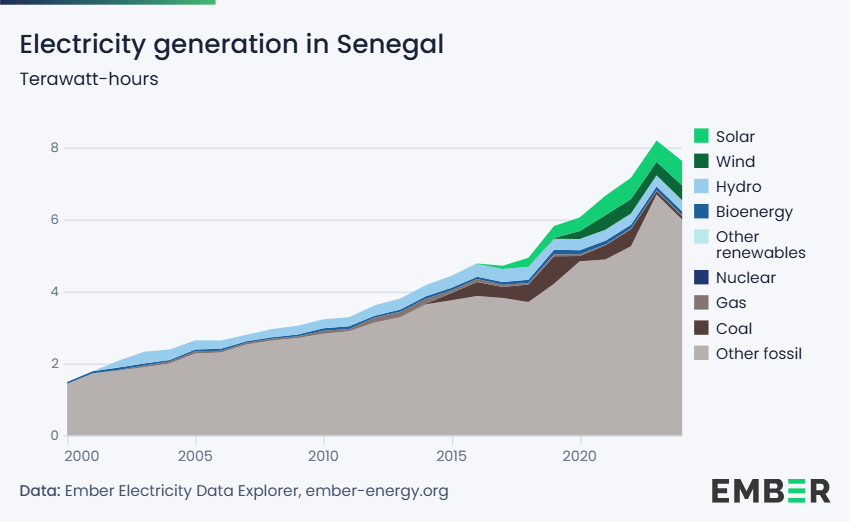
Electricity generation in Senegal in terawatt-hours

As of April 2020, the energy sector in Senegal has an installed capacity of 1431 megawatts (MW). Energy is produced by private operators and sold to the Senelec energy corporation. According to a 2020 report by the International Energy Agency, Senegal had nearly 70% of the country connected to the national grid. Current government strategies for electrification include investments in off-grid solar and connection to the grid.

Most of the energy production is from fossil fuels, mostly diesel and gas (733 of 864 MW). An increasing amount of the energy production comes from sustainable sources, such as Manantali Dam in Mali and a new wind farm in Thiès opened in 2020—however, it is still a small portion of the total production. Despite increases in production in the 2010s, the economy is frequently hindered by energy shortages compared to demand.

== Electricity sector ==
Following institutional reform in 1998, Senegal's electricity sector was split into three entities: Senelec, the national utility, the Agency for Rural Electrification (Agence Sénégalaise d'Electrification Rurale, ASER) and the Electricity Regulatory Board (Commission de Régulation au Secteur de l'Electricité, CRSE).

Electricity generation, mainly on a build-own-operate (BOO) basis, is open to the private sector. Senelec, the sole buyer, signs power purchase contracts with independent power producers (IPPs).

== Electricity production ==
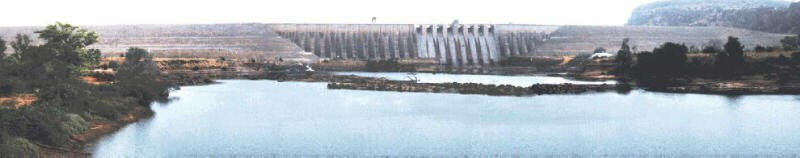
The Manantali Dam in Mali generates some of Senegal's electricity needs.

Senegal's major source of electricity is diesel. The rest is mostly coal and hydroelectricity. Renewables should make up 30% of the country's energy mix and the wind farm in Taïba Ndiaye will supply half. The planned energy mix aims to help Senegal move away from oil dependence, although newly discovered gas reserves offshore are expected to be used domestically to replace diesel and coal.

=== Fossil fuel energy production ===
Senegal has remained only a marginal natural gas producer and most of its thermal electricity comes from diesel and heavy fuel oil (HFO).

- The General Electric/GTI Dakar IPP, which supplies approximately 20 percent of Senelec's electrical needs, was commissioned in 1998. It has an installed capacity of 56 MW. GTI Dakar was developed by American company CC Hinckley Co. (www.cchinckley.com)
- On-line since January 2008, the second IPP Kounoune 1 – 67.5 MW – was partially funded by the International Finance Corporation, with Mitsubishi and Matelec S.A.L, a division of the Doumet group from Lebanon, as strategic partners.
- In 2016 another IPP operator, ContourGlobal commissioned an 88 MW diesel power plant with Wartsila engines and a steam turbine at Cap des Biches.

Several additional thermal power stations were under-construction in 2022, including the 130 MW Malicounda plant financed by Africa50, and the 300 MW Cap des Biches plant of West African Energy. The government's ambition is to be able to feed most existing and future thermal stations with domestic natural gas from offshore fields discovered by bp and Kosmos Energy.

=== Sustainable energy production ===
==== Hydropower ====
Some hydroelectricity generated from the Manantali Dam in Mali is split between Senegal, Mali, and Mauritania. Manantali has an installed capacity of 200 MW dispatched as follows: 52% for Mali, 15% for Mauritania and 33% for Senegal (66 MW).

==== Solar energy ====
As of 2019, Five solar plants have been opened in Senegal: Senergy (30 MW), Ten Merina (30 MW), Malicounda (22 MW) and two 20 MW capacity plants operated by Engie.

Two new solar photovoltaic plants will be built: the 25 megawatt peak (MWp) Kael solar park in the Touba region in western Senegal and the 35 MWp Kahone solar park in the Kaolack region in central western Senegal.

==== Wind energy ====
Taiba NDiaye wind farm was completed in January 2020. It is the largest wind farm in West Africa and when its 46 wind turbines are completed in June, it will provide 158 megawatts of electricity, or up to 15% of Sinelec's total supply. Construction cost 200 billion CFA francs (€342 million). The wind farm is located in Thiès (86 km north of Dakar), swept by the harmattan and the Atlantic winds. The turbines will provide two million people with electricity. Opposition to the project has centered on questions of low compensation for land and trees that were uprooted.

== Electricity demand and supply gaps ==
Senelec is dealing with a chronic electricity production gap, which has worsened due to growing demand for electricity. The average demand increase during 2005-2009 is estimated at 7%, representing an electricity consumption of 1.933 TWh in 2005 to an estimated 2.66 TWh in 2009. The company is experiencing declining reliability of aging power plants.

Senegal's GDP growth was hindered in 2007 by frequent electricity outages, which caused a slowdown of the economic and manufacturing activities. The GDP growth rate decreased to 2.1% in 2006 from 5.5% in 2005. According to local reports, the outages have contributed to the closure of many small and medium-sized enterprises (SMEs) in the food processing, textile, and tourism sectors. Larger companies are reporting declines in output averaging 30%.

=== Future development ===
Senegal is committed to shifting from a diesel-based power generation to cheaper energy sources. Senegal has thus put an option on the coal technology. The recent bid to build-own and operate a 125 MW coal-fired Sendou power station was awarded to a consortium of companies headed by the Swedish operator Nykomb Synergetics. In addition, Senegal has embarked on an aggressive effort to produce significant quantities of biofuels, initially to run electricity generation units, and has a pilot project using sugarcane-based ethanol.
