= Mboro =

- Town and commune
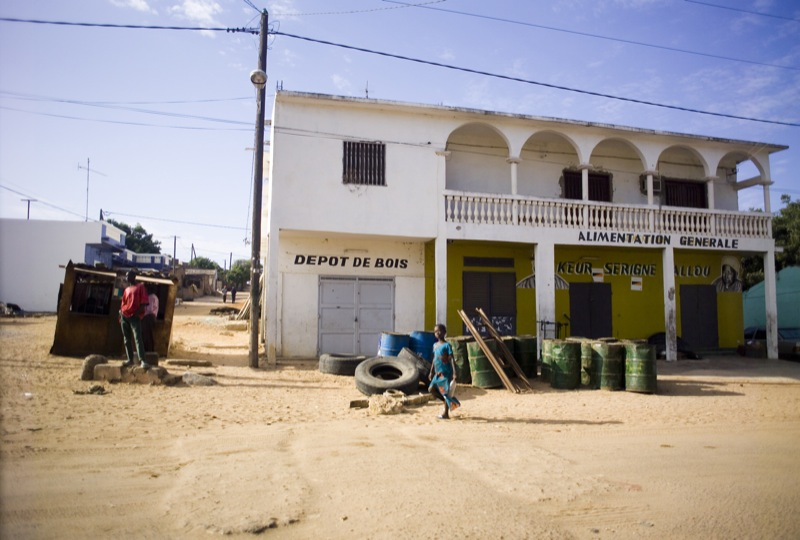

- Location within Senegal
- Coordinates: 15°09′N 16°54′W
- Country: Senegal
- Region: Thiès Region
- Department: Tivaouane Department

Area
  - Town and commune: 7.164 km^{2} (2.766 sq mi)

Population (2023 census)
  - Town and commune: 40,811
  - Density: 5,697/km^{2} (14,750/sq mi)
- Time zone: UTC+0 (GMT)

Mboro is a town and urban commune in the Thiès Region of western Senegal. It is located in the Tivaouane Department. The population in 2023 was 40,811.

The town received commune status in 2002. Mboro is situated 25 km west of Tivaouane and 117 km north of Dakar. There is a phosphate mine and factory in Mboro.
