= Moussa N'Diaye (footballer, born 1979) =

Senegalese footballer

Moussa Ndiaye
Personal information
- Date of birth: 20 February 1979 (age 47)
- Place of birth: Pire Goureye, Senegal
- Height: 1.80 m (5 ft 11 in)
- Position: Midfielder

Senior career*
Years	Team	Apps	(Gls)
1997–2000	Monaco	24	(3)
2000–2004	Sedan	101	(20)
2004–2005	Istres	41	(6)
2005–2006	Ajaccio	17	(5)
2006–2007	Auxerre	15	(0)
2007–2008	Al-Rayyan	10	(1)
2008–2009	Umm-Salal	7	(2)
2010	ASC Diaraf	3	(0)
2011–2012	AS Douanes		
2013–2015	ASC Niarry Tally		
2015–2017	US Gorée		

International career
1998–2007	Senegal	58	(8)
- * Club domestic league appearances and goals

Moussa Ndiaye (born 20 February 1979) is a Senegalese former professional footballer who played as a midfielder.

== Club career ==
Ndiaye was born in Pire Goureye. He played for AS Monaco and CS Sedan, both in France. At Monaco he was part of the squad that won Ligue 1 in 2000.

== International career ==
Ndiaye played for Senegal national team and was a participant at the 2002 FIFA World Cup.

== Career statistics ==
Scores and results list Senegal's goal tally first, score column indicates score after each N'Diaye goal.

List of international goals scored by Moussa N'Diaye
No.	Date	Venue	Opponent	Score	Result	Competition
1	18 July 1999	Stade Leopold Senghor, Dakar, Senegal	Eritrea	6–1	6–2	2000 African Cup of Nations qualification
2	8 August 1999	Stade Leopold Senghor, Dakar, Senegal	Zimbabwe	1–0	2–0	2000 Africa Cup of Nations qualification
3	9 April 2000	Stade de l'Amitié, Cotonou, Benin	Benin	1–0	1–1	2002 FIFA World Cup qualification
4	21 July 2001	Independence Stadium, Windhoek, South Africa	Namibia	5–0	5–0	2002 FIFA World Cup qualification
5	5 June 2004	Stade Leopold Senghor, Dakar, Senegal	DR Congo	2–0	2–0	2006 FIFA World Cup qualification
6	26 March 2005	Stade Leopold Senghor, Dakar, Senegal	Liberia	5–0	6–1	2006 World Cup qualification
7	1 March 2006	Stade Leopold Senghor, Dakar, Senegal	Norway	1–0	2–1	Friendly
8	23 May 2006	Seoul World Cup Stadium, Seoul, South Korea	South Korea	1–1	1–1	Friendly

== Honours ==
Monaco

- Ligue 1: 1999–2000
