= Thiénaba (arrondissement) =

- Arrondissement
- Country: Senegal

Thiénaba is an arrondissement of Thiès in Thiès Region in Senegal.
