= Merina Dakhar Arrondissement =

- Arrondissement
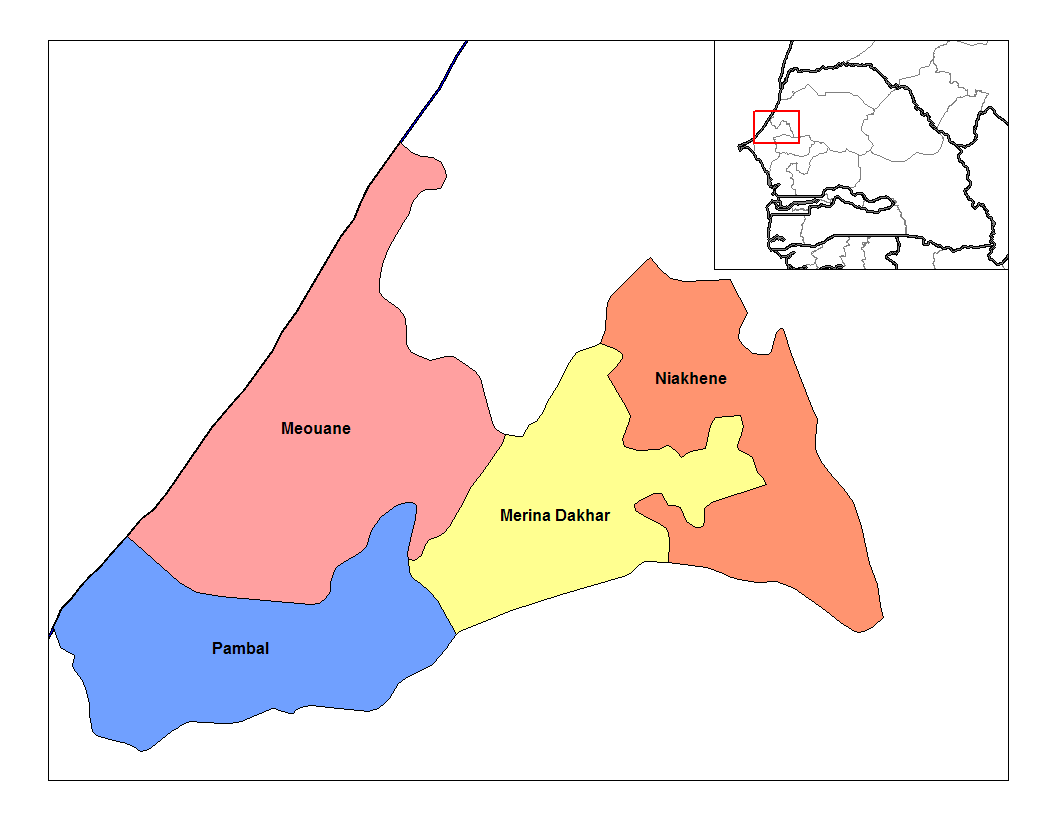
- Location in the Tivaouane Department
- Country: Senegal
- Region: Thiès Region
- Department: Tivaouane Department
- Time zone: UTC±00:00 (GMT)

Merina Dakhar Arrondissement is an arrondissement of the Tivaouane Department in the Thiès Region of Senegal.

== Subdivisions ==
The arrondissement is divided administratively into rural communities and in turn into villages.
