= Niayes =

Geographical area in Senegal

Niayes is a geographical area in northwestern Senegal which forms a coastal strip, with sand dunes adjoining the sea being backed by a string of fresh water lakes. The land is used for horticulture and the grazing of cattle, and provides suitable habitat for waterfowl and other birds. The Niayes Arrondissement is subdivided into four administrative regions.

The area is important both economically and for conservation, but is threatened by desertification.

== Geography ==
Niayes occupies a narrow strip of land along the Atlantic coast of Senegal, varying in length from 100 to 280 km (62 to 174 mi) and in width from 25 to 30 km (16 to 19 mi). It extends from the peninsula of Cap-Vert to the Mauritanian border and from the coast roughly to the road leading from Dakar to Saint-Louis. The Niayes Arrondissement is divided into four administrative subdivisions: the Dakar Region, the Thiès Region, the Louga Region and the Saint-Louis Region.

The area has a ridge of coastal sand dunes, behind which is a series of permanent, fresh water lakes, lying a few metres above sea level and running parallel to the coast. The largest is Lake Retba, some 5 km (3.1 mi) long. The lakes receive water from precipitation and from the underlying water table, and their surface area increases dramatically in the wet season. Since the middle of the twentieth century, Niayes has been experiencing a significant reduction in precipitation, with rainfall averages in the 1990s being about half what they were in the 1950s, putting the area at risk of desertification.

== Land use ==
Niayes is very important to the economy of Senegal, being used for fishing, cattle-grazing and market gardening, with large quantities of vegetables, fruit and rice being grown, made possible by the high water table and the moisture-laden winds blowing in from the ocean. Belts of salt-tolerant Casuarina equisetifolia have been planted to prevent wind erosion of the soil.

== Biodiversity ==
The dominant tree species are the African oil-palm, along with the African mesquite and Cape fig. The wetlands of Niayes are recognised by BirdLife International as an Important Bird Area, an area identified as being globally important for the conservation of bird populations. It is visited by a large variety of raptors and by breeding and wintering waterbirds; these include the lesser flamingo, American flamingo, lesser kestrel, black kite, sandwich tern, little tern, reed cormorant, little egret and northern shoveler.
