= Kounoune power station =

The Kounoune power station is an oil-fired power station in Senegal. It is the first infrastructure project in Senegal carried out by private investors.

== History ==
Kounoune Power SA, a Senegalese limited liability company for construction and operation of the power station was established in July 2004. The 15-year energy supply contract with Senelec was signed on 5 February 2005. On 18 May 2005, the World Bank approved credits, loans and partial risk guarantees of the project. The African Development Bank approved project investment on 22 June 2005, and the loan agreement was signed on 18 November 2005. On 21 July 2006, the African Development Bank and Kounoune Power SA signed security agreements of mortgage, collateral and pledges in Dakar.

== Description ==
The power station is located at Kounoune, 23 kilometres (14 mi) east of Dakar. It is a 67.5 MW oil-fueled power station.

== Financing ==
The project cost 45 billion CFA francs (€48 .million). The African Development Bank contributed €8 million, the International Finance Corporation €17 million, PROPARCO €11 million, the West African Development Bank €4.6 million and the West African Banking Corporation €7.4 million. The International Development Association (IDA)provided a partial risk guarantee of US$7.2 million, and BMCE Bank served as a commercial broker.

== Project company ==
Strategic partners of Kounoune Power SA are Mitsubishi and Matelec S.A.L, a division of the Doumet group.
