= Pire Goureye =

- Town and commune
- Location in Senegal
- Coordinates: 15.00745°N 16.74°W
- Country: Senegal
- Region: Thies Region
- Department: Tivaouane
- Arrondissement: Pambal

Area
  - Town and commune: 172.3 km^{2} (66.5 sq mi)

Population (2023 census)
  - Town and commune: 32,685
  - Density: 189.7/km^{2} (491.3/sq mi)
- Time zone: UTC+0 (GMT)

Pire Goureye is a town and commune located in the Thies Region of Senegal.

== History ==
Pire has been an important Islamic center since at least the mid-17th century. An Islamic university was founded there in the late 1600s by Hammat Fall under the patronage of Damel Lat Sukaabe Fall of Cayor.

== Notable People who Studied in Pire ==
- Abdul Kader, founder of the Imamate of Futa Toro
- Sulayman Bal
- Malick Sy
