= Fissel Arrondissement =

- Arrondissement
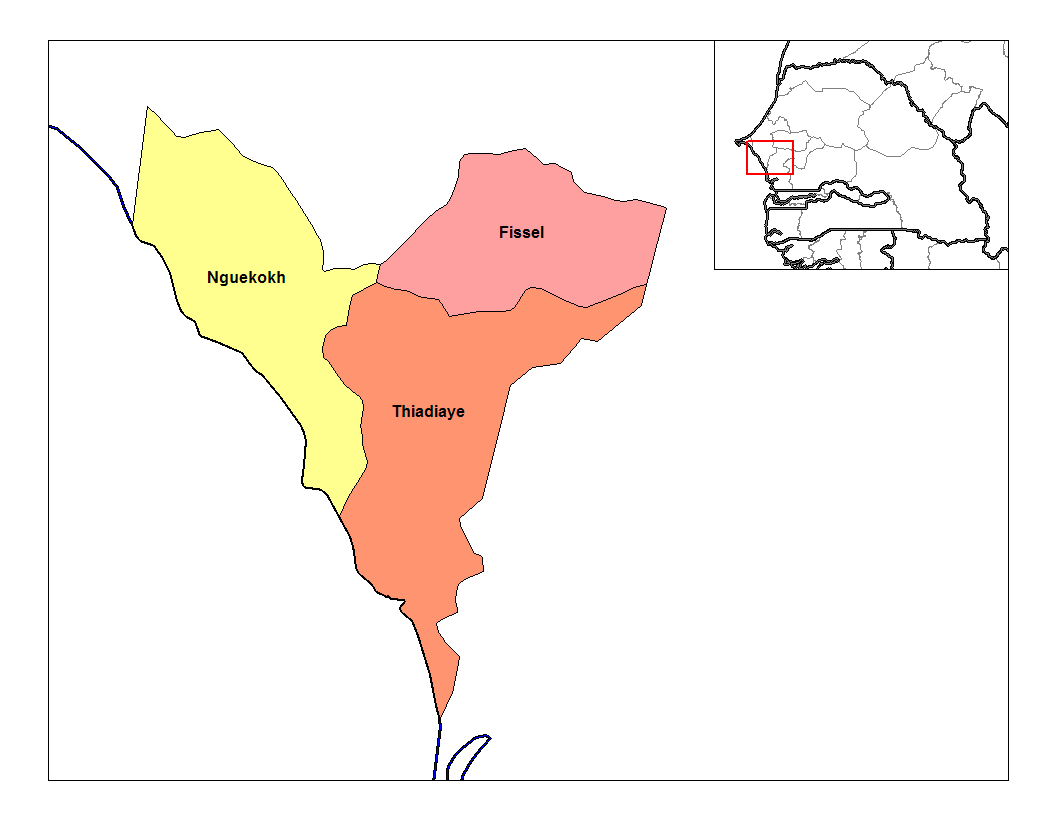
- Location in the M'bour Department
- Country: Senegal
- Region: Thiès Region
- Department: M'bour Department
- Time zone: UTC±00:00 (GMT)

Fissel Arrondissement is an arrondissement of the M'bour Department in the Thiès Region of Senegal. The arrondissement is divided administratively into rural communities, and in turn into villages.
