= Malick Sy =

Senegalese Imam (1853–1922)

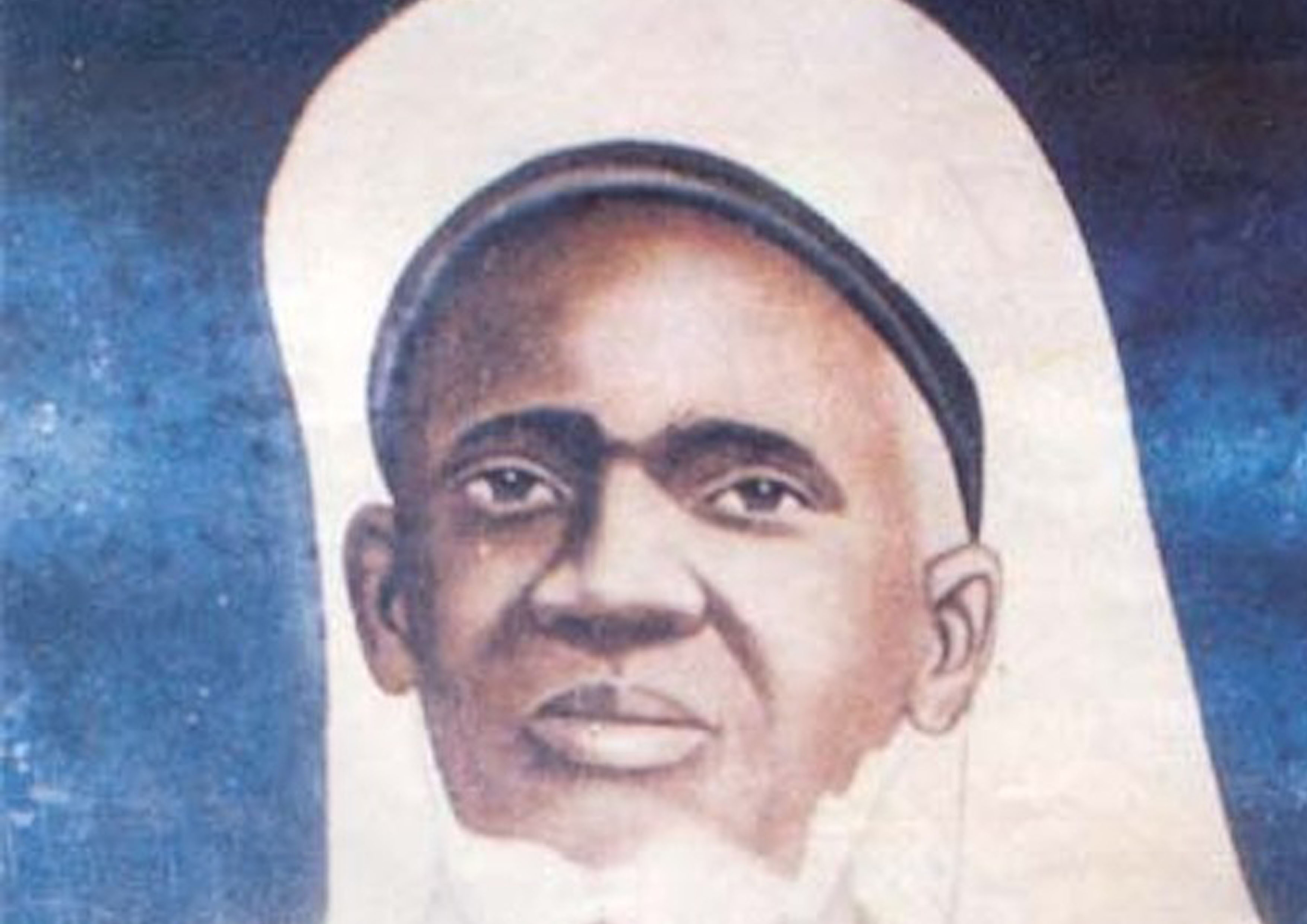
Painting of Cheikh El Hadji Malick Sy

El-Hadji Malick Sy (Fula: Allaaji Maalik Si, 1853–1922) was a Senegalese religious leader and teacher in the Tijaniyya Sufi Malikite and Ash'arite brotherhood.

== Life ==
Born in Gaya, northern Senegal, to a Fulani family, El-Hadji Malick Sy traveled to Mauritania, then to Saint-Louis, Senegal in 1884 as a religious student. He traveled to Mecca, then returned to teach at Louga and Pire Goureye before establishing a zāwiya (religious center) at Tivaouane he settled permanently in 1898 in Tivaouane in 1902 following guidance received from his father in law Mor Massamba Diery Dieng father of his wife Sokhna Yacine Dieng and at the invitation of local leader Djibril Guèye, which became a center for Islamic education and culture under his leadership. In Senegal's Wolof country, especially the northern regions of Kajoor and Jolof, the Tijānī Order was spread primarily by El-Hajj Malick Sy.

== Legacy ==
After his death on 27 June 1922, Malick Sy was succeeded by his son Seydi Ababacar Sy as the khalife général des Tidjanes from 1922 to 1957. The family line has continued to hold the title, with El-Hadji Abdou Aziz Sy from 1957 to 1997, to the current khalife, Serigne Mabye Sy Mansour after his cousin El Hadji Abdul Aziz Sy Al Ibn who himself succeeded his brother Cheikh Ahmed Tidiane sy “Al Makhtoum”. The Gàmmu (Mawlid in Arabic, the celebration of the birth of Muḥammad) of Tivaouane gathers many followers each year. There is an Avenue Malik Sy in Dakar.

== Literature ==
Malick is also the author of many poems and books about Islam, Muhammad, and At-Tijani:

- taïssir
- Ifham al Munkiru Jaani ("Silencing of deniers"): a defense of the Tijaniyya and some points to case law (translated into French by Rawane Mbaye)
- Khilaçu ez-Zahab: a comprehensive rhyming biography on Muhammad, his companions and relatives, regularly recited during religious celebrations in Senegal, particularly during the Mawlid (book translated into French by Rawane Mbaye)
- Sharh Khilaçu ez-Zahabخلاص الذهب في سيرة خير العرب: comment on this biography by the author himself.
- Zajr Ul Qulub: a poem dealing pious exhortations and ascetic various topics.
- Adab Ul Masjid: a poem dealing with the conveniences that exist when the faithful went to the mosque and made her worship.
- Al Hidayat Ul Wildan: a treatise on Islamic theology (based on Ash'arite school).
- Faakihatul Tullab: A Primer on the Tijaniyya, its teachings and practices (translated into French by Rawane Mbaye)
- Diwan: a collection of poetry on Mohamed, Ahmad Tijani Umar Ibn Sa'id Al Tall Futi and containing other Islamic knowledge as inheritance, rhetoric and advice to Muslims in general and faithful tijanes particularly.
- Khutbatul Jumu'a: a sermon for Friday prayers
- Khutbatul 'I'd: a sermon Day (tabaski and / or Korité)
- Kifayat ar-Raghibîn ("Who are the good believers"): a series of jurisprudential texts and spiritual characters dealing with various subjects (also translated into French by Rawane Mbaye)

== Bibliography ==
- From Tijaniyya, and translation from Malick Sy French Wikipedia.
- (fr) Cheikh Tidiane Fall, El Hadji Malick Sy à Tivaouane de 1902 à 1922, Dakar, Université de Dakar, 1986, 92 p. (Mémoire de Maîtrise)
- Short Biography
- the Mame Mawdo Malick Sy Foundation
- El Hadj Malick Sy : Soufi et Grand accoucheur du «musulman de midi» in le quotidien, 10 April 2006.
