= Keur Moussa (arrondissement) =

- Arrondissement
- Location within Senegal
- Country: Senegal

Keur Moussa is an arrondissement of Thiès in Thiès Region in Senegal.
