= Ndiass =

- Rural community
- Location within Senegal
- Coordinates: 14°38′21″N 17°5′16″W
- Country: Senegal
- Region: Thiès Region
- Department: M'bour Department
- Arrondissement: Pout Arrondissement

Population (2003)
  - Total: 4,794
- Time zone: UTC+0 (GMT)

Ndiass is a village and rural community in the M'bour Department in the Thiès Region of Senegal. It is located 40 kilometres (25 mi) southeast of Dakar. According to PEPAM (Programme d'eau potable et d'assainissement du Millénaire), Ndiass has a population of 4,794. Blaise Diagne International Airport, Senegal's primary airport, is located nearby.

The main settlements are Ndiass, Ndeing, Ngam, Sakirack, Khoubite, Sahé and Escale.

Ndiass is home to many baobab trees. The Popenguine Nature Reserve and Bandia Reserve are close and share the same ecosystem.

The main language is Saafi but also Wolof.
