= Bargny, Senegal =

- Commune
- Location within Senegal
- Coordinates: 14°41′36″N 17°14′01″W
- Country: Senegal
- Region: Dakar Region

Area
  - Commune: 12.99 km^{2} (5.02 sq mi)
- Elevation: 1 m (3.3 ft)

Population (2023 census)
  - Commune: 69,242
  - Density: 5,330/km^{2} (13,810/sq mi)
- Time zone: UTC+0 (GMT)

Bargny (also, Bargny-Gouddau and Bargny Gouddou) is a settlement and urban commune in Senegal. It is located in a somewhat sheltered bay about 15 km to the east of the capital, Dakar.

== Environment ==
The community has a number of severe environmental threats, including coastal erosion and contamination from economic projects and industries in the community.

== Industries ==
=== Cement ===
The town holds one of the largest cement factories in West Africa. Created in 1984, the factory creates toxic dust which exposes local residents to contamination.

=== Transport ===
Bargny is the site of a proposed deep water port for mineral exports, such as iron ore.

The railway following the coast from Dakar heads inland from this point to Thiès.

In 2016, construction of the Train Express Regional started.

=== Power ===
A coal-fired power station, the Sendou power station, was opened in 2018.

== Notable people ==
- Abasse Ndione (1946-) -writer

== See also ==
- Railway stations in Senegal
