= Niayes Arrondissement =

- Arrondissement
- Interactive map of Niayes Arrondissement
- Country: Senegal
- Region: Dakar Region
- Department: Pikine Department

Area
  - Total: 40 km^{2} (15 sq mi)

Population (2013 census)
  - Total: 499,119
  - Density: 12,000/km^{2} (32,000/sq mi)
- Time zone: UTC±00:00 (GMT)

Niayes Arrondissement is an arrondissement of the Pikine Department in the Dakar Region of Senegal.

It is divided into 4 communes d'arrondissement; Keur Massar, Malika, Yeumbeul Nord and Yeumbeul Sud.
