= Tivaouane =

- City and commune
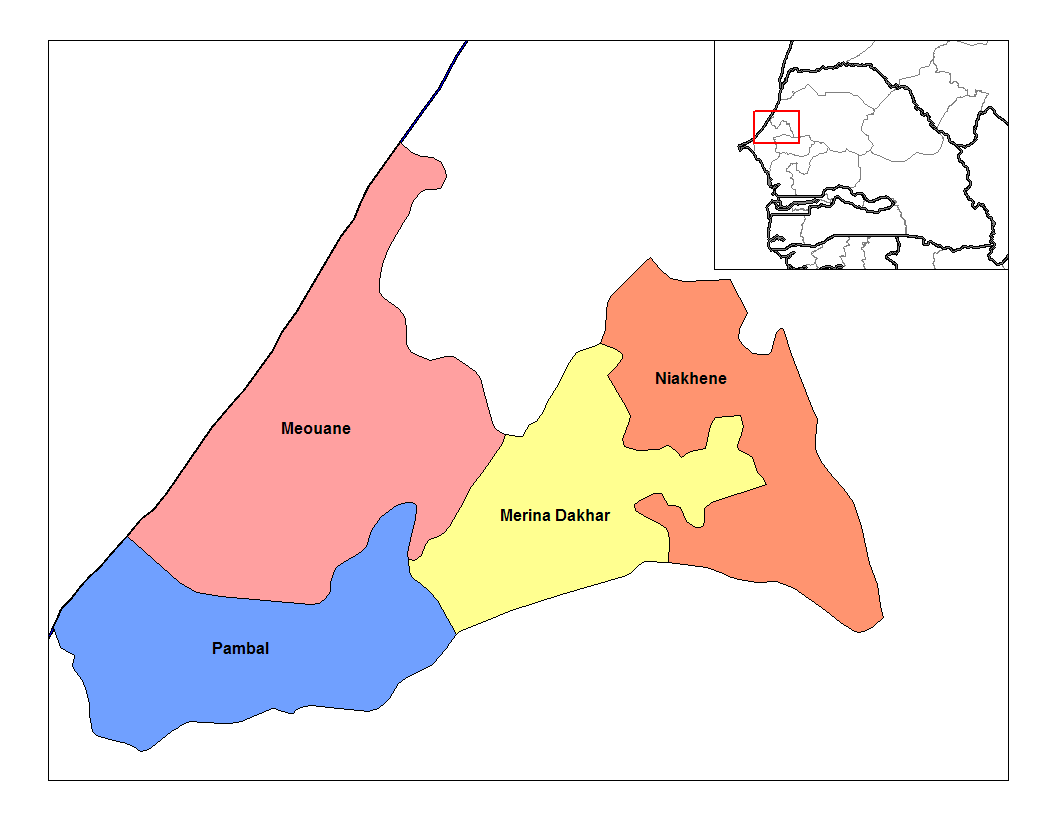
- Arrondissements of the Tivaouane Department

- Location within Senegal
- Coordinates: 14°57′0″N 16°49′0″W
- Country: Senegal
- Region: Thiès
- Department: Tivaouane

Government
  - Mayor: Demba Diop dit Diop Sy

Area
  - City and commune: 16.28 km^{2} (6.29 sq mi)

Population (2023 census)
  - City and commune: 102,658
  - Density: 6,306/km^{2} (16,330/sq mi)

Tivaouane or Tivawan (Wolof: Tiwaawan; French: Tivaouane) is a city and urban commune located in the Thiès Region of Senegal.

== History ==
Tivaouane was part of the Wolof kingdom of Cayor, and was at one time its capital. It was first described to Europeans in the 15th century by Venetian explorer Luigi Cada-Mosto.

In 1904, it was the fifth largest city in Sénégal after Saint-Louis, Dakar, Rufisque and Gorée.

It is also one of the sacred places of the Tijaniyya Sufi brotherhood. Each week, followers come to visit the tombs of religious leaders, especially that of El-Hadji Malick Sy. Visitors flock each year to celebrate the birth of Muhammad in a festival called the Maouloud (or Gamou, in Wolof, a word borrowed from the Serer word Gamahou or Gamohou - meaning "to find the lost heart", which is one of the ancient Serer religious festivals).

The influence of the Muslim brotherhoods of Senegal helps to explain the dramatic demographic growth of the city, which had a population of less than 7900 in 1960.

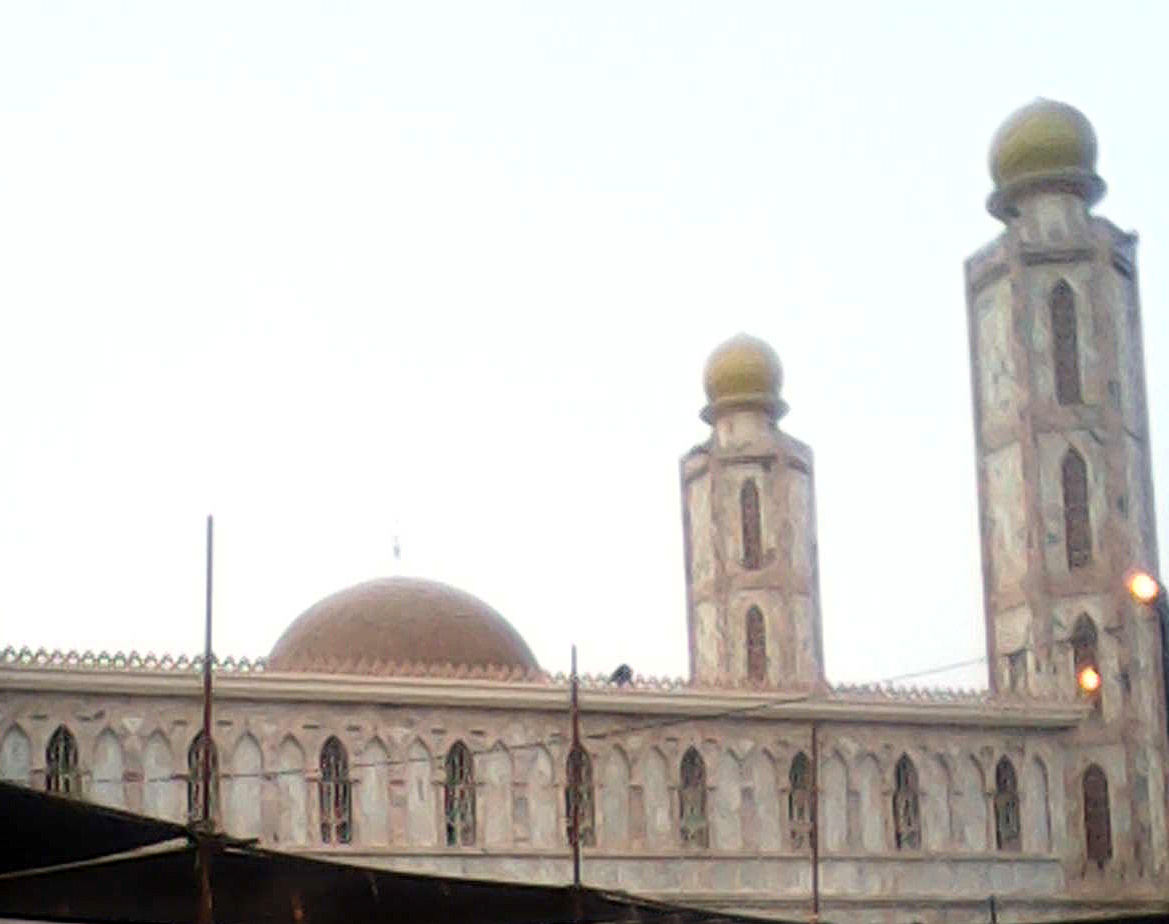
Mosque of Serigne Babacar Sy

In 2003, the mosque and zawia (Muslim school) of El-Hadji Malick Sy, the mosque of Serigne Babacar Sy and the railway station were added to the list of Senegalese historic monuments.

In 2022, the recently inaugurated Mame Abdou Aziz Sy Dabakh Hospital in Tivaouane caught fire due to a short circuit. The neonatal department burned down to the ground, with 11 newborn babies dead.

== Administration ==
Tivaouane is the capital of the Tivaouane Department in the région de Thiès.

== Geography ==
Tivaouane is a regional transport hub, where the route nationale n° 2 connecting Dakar and Saint-Louis passes near Thiès.

The nearest small towns are Yendam, Keur Massamba Daguene, Selko, Ndiagane, Keur Assane, Ndiassane and Sintiou Pir.

== Population ==
Between the censuses of 1988 and 2002, Tivaouane grew from 27,117 to 38,213 inhabitants. The 2023 census counted 102,658 residents.

In 2007, according to official estimates, the population has grown to 39,766, which makes it the 15th largest city in Senegal.

Wolofs are the largest ethnic group in the area.

== Economy ==
Tivaouane is in an agricultural region, at the heart of the bassin arachidier of Arachide oil (Peanut oil) production.

Catering to religious gatherings and celebrations also plays a great role in the economy.

== See also ==
=== Bibliography ===
- Translation of Fr:Wikipedia Article.
- (in French) Aboubacar Diaw Seydi, L’évolution de la population de Tivaouane depuis le début du siècle, Dakar, Université de Dakar, 1988, 3 + 94 p. + 8 p. (Mémoire de Maîtrise de géographie)
- (in French) Cheikh Tidiane Fall, El Hadji Malick Sy à Tivaouane de 1902 à 1922, Dakar, Université de Dakar, 1986, 92 p. (Mémoire de Maîtrise)
