= Thiès department =

Coordinates: 14°50′03″N 17°06′22″W

Thiès
- Department
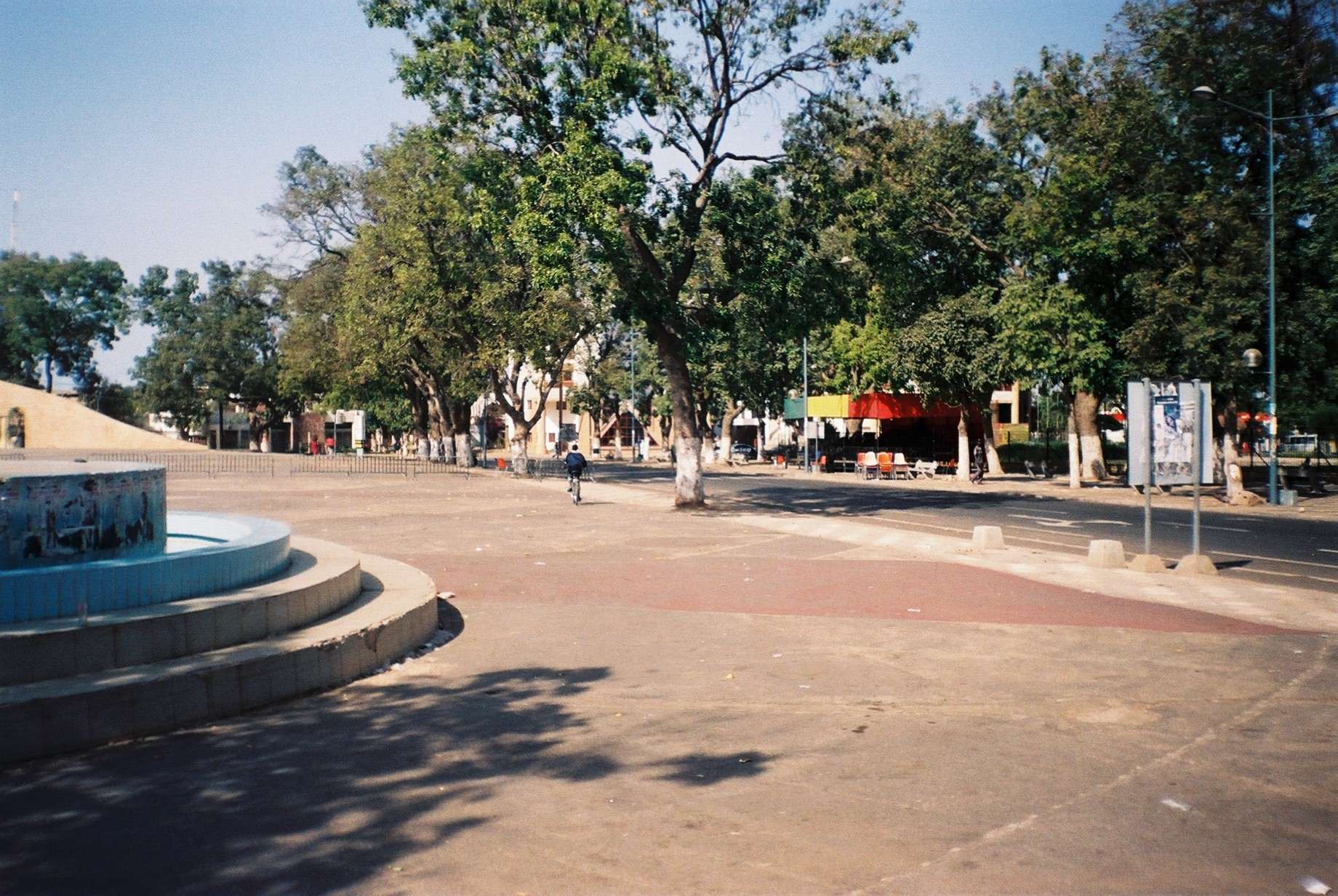
- Thiès town centre

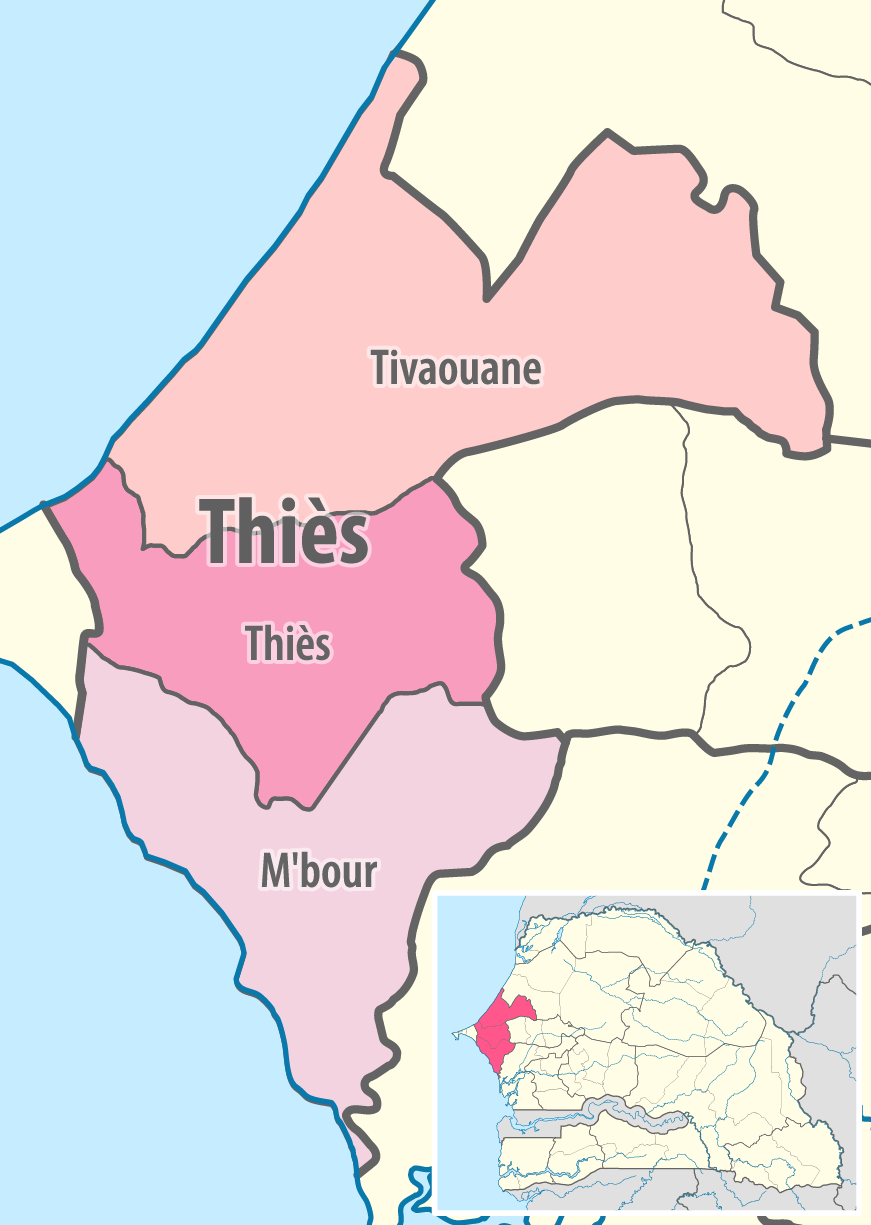
- Location in the Thiès region
- Country: Senegal
- Region: Thiès region
- Capital: Thiès

Area
  - Total: 1,873 km^{2} (723 sq mi)

Population (2023 census)
  - Total: 880,266
  - Density: 470.0/km^{2} (1,217/sq mi)
- Time zone: UTC+0 (GMT)

Thiès department is one of the 46 departments of Senegal, one of the three located in the Thiès region.

There are four urban communes in the department: Kayar, Khombole, Pout and Thiès.

The rural districts (communautés rurales) comprise:

- Arrondissement of Keur Moussa:
  - Keur Moussa
  - Diender
  - Fandène
- Arrondissement of Notto:
  - Notto
  - Tassette
- Arrondissement of Thiénaba:
  - Thiénaba
  - Ngoudiane
  - Ndiéyène Sirah
  - Touba Toul

== Historic sites ==
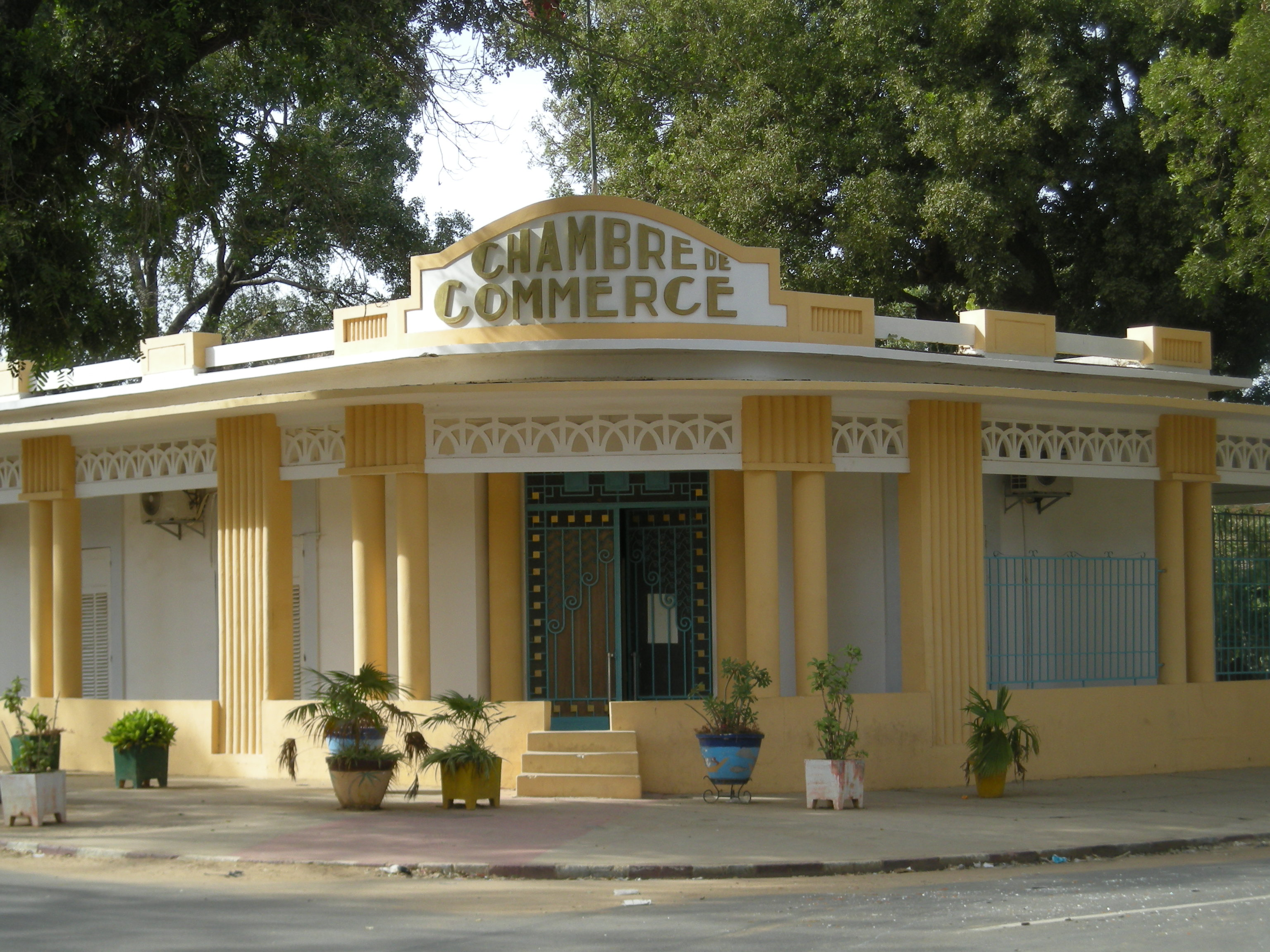
Thiès Chamber of Commerce

Thiès town

- Railway station and warehouses
- Place Ibrahima Sarr, Ballabey city
- The building of the Director General of the SNCS
- "Building of the Three Clocks" of the SNCS
- Thiès Fort, now regional museum
- Principal building housing the Government
- Principal building housing the Chamber of Commerce
- Thiès Cathédrale and the Evéché building
- Building housing the Saint Anne's school opposite the Cathedral
- Thiès Post office

Thiès department

- Mbidièm Fort, Arrondissement de Pout
- Diack Quarries archeological site, Arrondissement de Thiénaba
- Diakité Quarries archeological site
- Pout Post Office
