= Sendou power station =

Power station in Senegal

- Country: Senegal
- Location: Sendou
- Coordinates: 14°41′20.63″N 17°13′03.46″W
- Owners: Nordic Power, local minorities

Thermal power station
- Primary fuel: Coal, to be converted to Gas

Power generation
- Units operational: 1
- Nameplate capacity: 125 MW
- Annual net output: 925 GWh

The Sendou power station (French: Centrale électrique de Sendou) is a coal-fired power station in Senegal. The power plant, located near Bargny, is currently in operation and will be transformed to a natural gas-fired power station in the near future.

== History ==
The international tender was launched on 18 November 2005. The agreement between the Minister of Energy of Senegal and the Director General of Senelec on one side and Nykomb Synergetics on other side was signed on 24 January 2008 in Dakar. The agreement stipulated construction and operation of the power station by the Nykomb Synergetics-led consortium, and generated power purchasing by Senelec.

The power station is located in the village of Sendou (also known as Siendou), 35 kilometres (22 mi) south-east of Dakar. It is located on the seafront in mostly industrial surrounding and does not affect the biological diversity or areas of nature. The Sendou power station is a coal-fired single unit power station with a total generating capacity of 125 MW and a net capacity of 115 MW, generating 925 GWh of electricity a year over a period of 27 years, with the undertaking of the current shareholders to convert the power station to a gas-fired power station by 2024. The initial coal fired project cost to date is FCFA 200.4 billion (as at Sept 2021).

== Project company ==
Compagnie d’Electricité du Sénégal SA is a consortium that was incorporated to develop and operate the Sendou power station. The consortium is led by SNPL and has senior lender backing from the African Development Bank, FMO, West African Development Bank, CBAO, Orabank, Barak Fund, and SNPL.
