= Tivaouane department =

Department in Senegal with capital Tivaouane

Coordinates: 14°58′28″N 16°56′23″W

Tivaouane
- Department
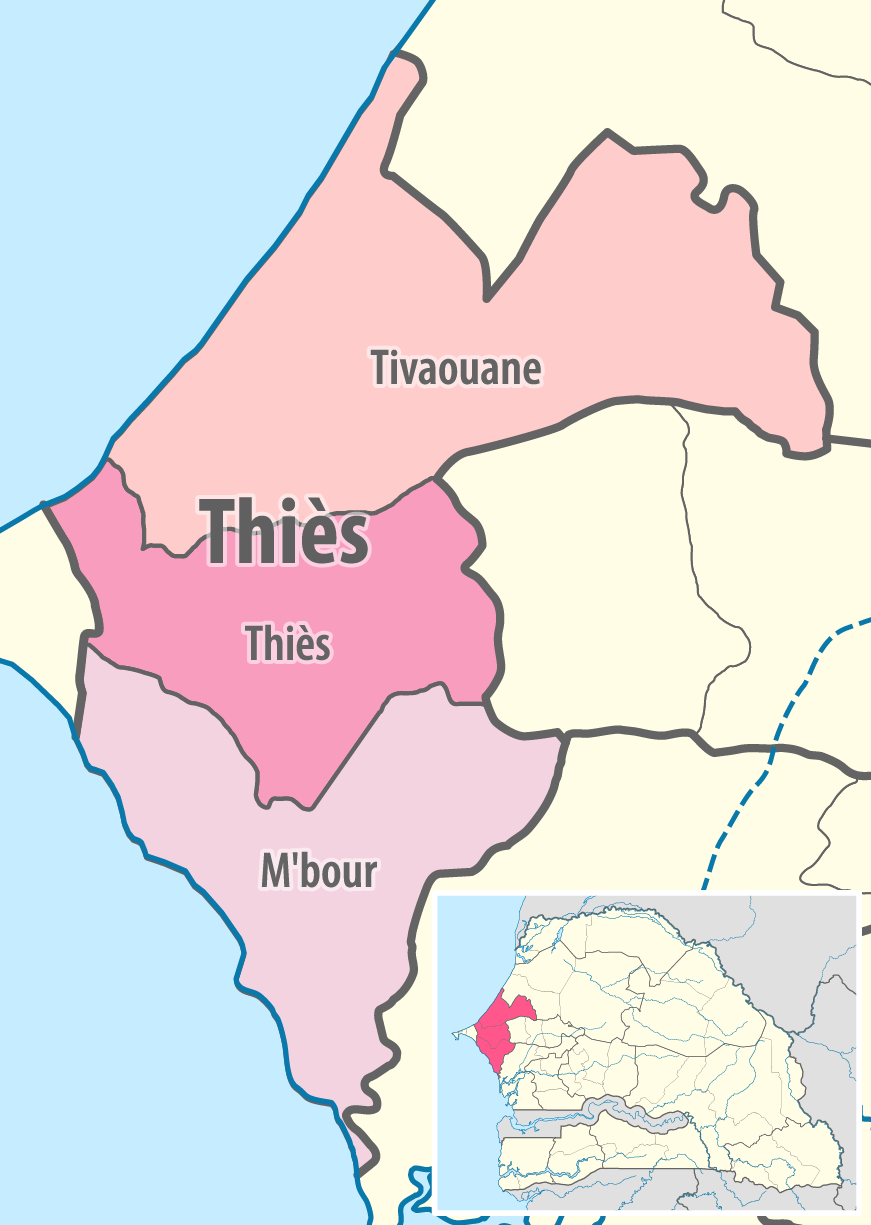
- Location in the Thiès region
- Country: Senegal
- Region: Thiès region
- Capital: Tivaouane

Area
  - Total: 3,121 km^{2} (1,205 sq mi)

Population (2023 census)
  - Total: 650,067
  - Density: 208.3/km^{2} (539.5/sq mi)
- Time zone: UTC+0 (GMT)

Tivaouane department is one of the 46 departments of Senegal, and one of the three in the Thiès region. Its capital is Tivaouane.

The department has three urban communes: Mboro, Meckhe and Tivaouane.

The rural districts (communautés rurales) comprise:

- Arrondissement of Mérina Dakhar:
  - Mérina Dakhar
  - Koul
  - Pékèsse
- Arrondissement of Méouane:
  - Méouane
  - Darou Khoudoss
  - Taïba Ndiaye
- Arrondissement of Niakhène:
  - Niakhène
  - Mbayène
  - Thilmakha
  - Ngandiouf
- Arrondissement de Pambal
  - Notto Gouye Diama
  - Mont Rolland
  - Pire Goureye
  - Chérif Lo

== Historic sites ==
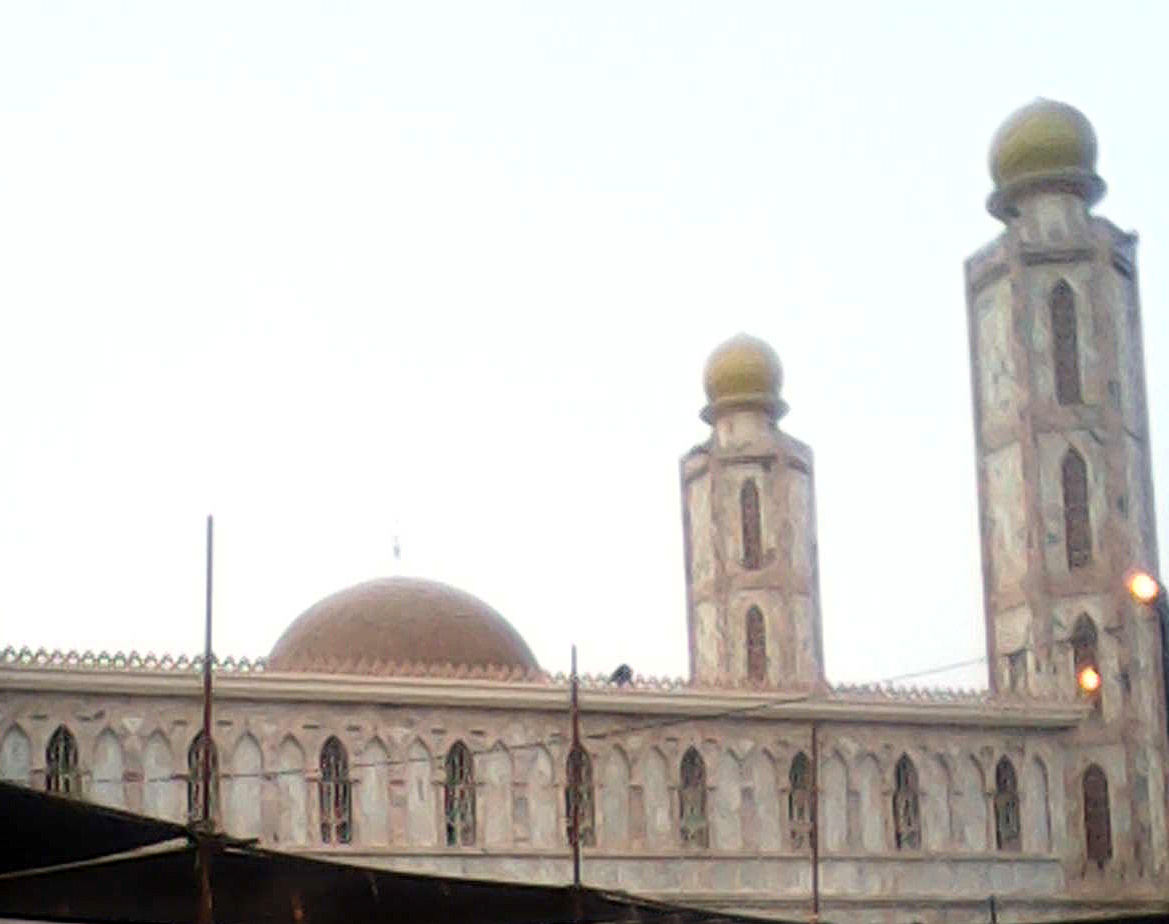
Serigne Babacar Sy mosque

- Tivaouane railway station
- Building housing the Prefecture (old residence of the Commandant of the Cayor) Circle
- Village of Longhor, historic and religious site
- Villages of Soughère and Nguiguis, historical sites, secondary capitals of the Damels of Cayor
- Village of Mboul, historic site, capital of the Damels
- Mausoleum of Khaly Madiakhaté Kala at Keur Makala, Arrondissement of Niakhène
- Mosque and Zawia of El Hadji Malick Sy (first constructed in 1904)
- Serigne Babacar Sy Mosque
- Mosquée et Zawia of the Kounta Family of Ndiassane
- Grand Mosque of Pire
- Mausoleum of Khaly Amar Fall at Pire
