= Thiès region =

Region of Senegal

Thiès region Région de Thiès (French) Diiwaanu Cees (Wolof)
- Region
- Location of Thiès in Senegal

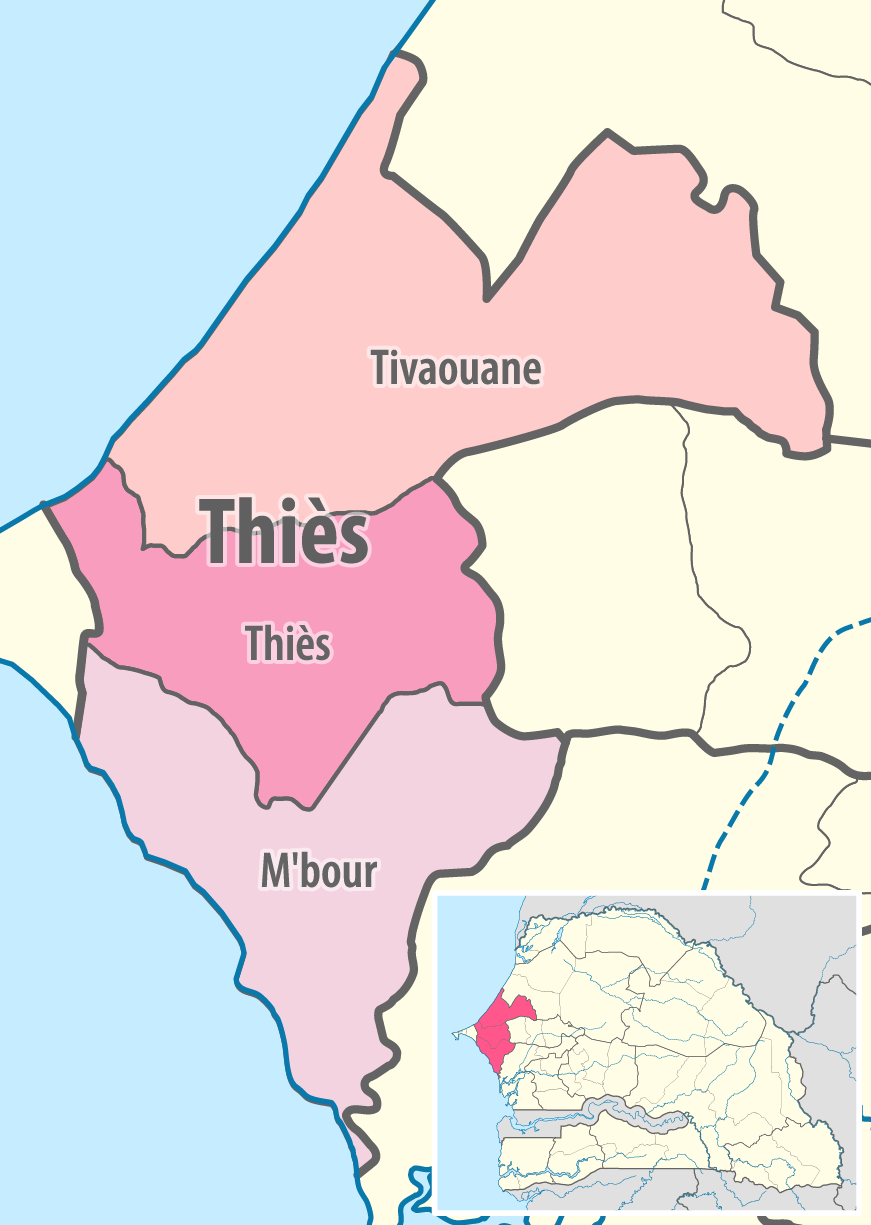
- Thiès région, divided into 3 départements
- Coordinates: 14°46′N 16°54′W
- Country: Senegal
- Capital: Thiès
- Départements: List: M'bour; Thiès; Tivaoune

Government
  - Governor: Amadou Sy

Area
  - Total: 6,670 km^{2} (2,580 sq mi)

Population (2023 census)
  - Total: 2,467,523
  - Density: 370/km^{2} (958/sq mi)
- Time zone: UTC+0 (GMT)
- HDI (2021): 0.562 medium · 3rd

Thiès is a region of western Senegal. The capital is also called Thiès.

== Geography ==
Thiès has two coastlines, one in the north with the Grande Côte housing the Niayes vegetable market, one to the south with the Petite Côte, one of the tourist areas of Senegal.

Principally the main passageway between the peninsula and the rest of the country, the region of Thiès has received a communication route connected to the first rail line and new road infrastructure.

Thiès is relatively small, yet it is the most populous region after Dakar, with a population of 2,467,523 inhabitants in 2023.

The coastal communities are dependent on fishing, growing crops, and coastal tourism for subsistence. The interior of the region was the peanut basin. Phosphates are also mined there.

== History ==
The Thiès Region has always been occupied by the Serer people since the ancient Serers and their ancestors. However, in the pre-colonial period, more so around the 16th century, the Wolof immigrants among others have settled in. Like the Fatick Region, the entire Thiès Region is strongly Serer and one of the most important of Serer country. It is also where many of the Serer sacred and historical sites are found. The area is well represented by the Cangin, a sub-group of the Serers, who had a fierce reputation for protecting their country from outsiders in precolonial times as well as during the colonial-era (see Timeline of Serer history and Serer medieval history).

Geographically, the region partially overlaps with the precolonial Kingdoms of Cayor and Baol. The Kingdom of Baol was ruled by the Joof family for several centuries until c 1549. During the colonial-era, its development was supported by the railway line - the Dakar-Saint-Louis railway in the late nineteenth century, and then with the Dakar-Niger railway. Thus Administratively, it is one of the oldest in the country.

== Administrative divisions ==
Thiès region is divided into 3 departments (départements), 14 communes (soon 15 communes in 2023), 12 arrondissements, 32 communautés rurales and 3 communes d'arrondissement.

=== Departments ===
The region is divided into 3 departments as follows':

- M'bour département
- Thiès département
- Tivaoune département

=== Communes ===
In M'bour département:

- Ville d'Akon (planned)
- M'bour
- Joal-Fadiouth
- Nguékhokh
- Ngaparou
- Popenguine-Ndayane
- Saly
- Somone
- Thiadiaye

In Thiès département:

- Kayar
- Khombole
- Pout

In Tivaouane département:

- Tivaouane
- Mboro
- Meckhe

=== Arrondissements ===
In M'bour département:

- Fissel
- Séssène
- Sindia

In Thiès département:

- Thiès Nord
- Thiès Sud
- Keur Moussa
- Notto
- Thiénaba

In Tivaouane département:

- Méouane
- Médina Dakhar
- Niakhène
- Pambal

=== Communautés rurales ===
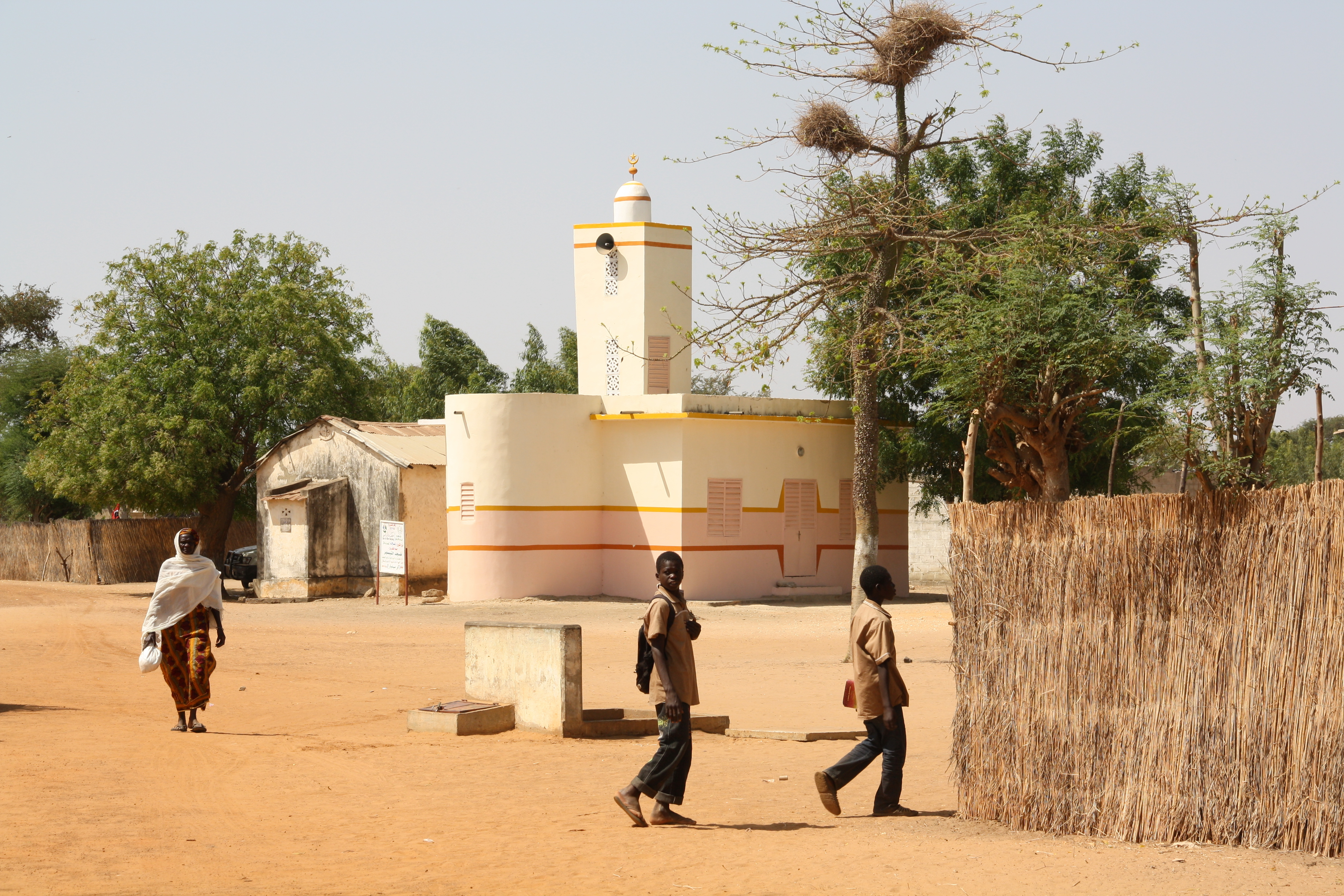
Keur Simbara is a tiny village in Thiès near Dakar

In M'bour département:

- Fissel
- Ndiaganiao
- Nguéniène
- Sandiara
- Séssène
- Malicounda
- Diass
- Sindia

In Thiès département:

- Diender Geudj
- Fandène
- Keur Moussa
- Notto
- Tassette
- Ndiayène Sirah
- Thiénaba
- Ngoudiane
- Touba Toul

In Tivaouane département:

- Méouane
- Taïba Ndiaye
- Darou-Khoudoss
- Koul
- Mérina Dakhar
- Pékesse
- Nbayène
- Ngandiouf
- Niakhène
- Thilmakha
- Chérif Lo
- Mont Rolland
- Notto Gouye Diama
- Pambal
- Pire Gourèye

In 2003, the rural population was 769,884, grouped in 31 villages, in communautés rurales.

== Notable residents ==
- Maurice Ndour (born 1992), basketball player for Pallacanestro Brescia of the Lega Basket Serie A.
