= Senelec =

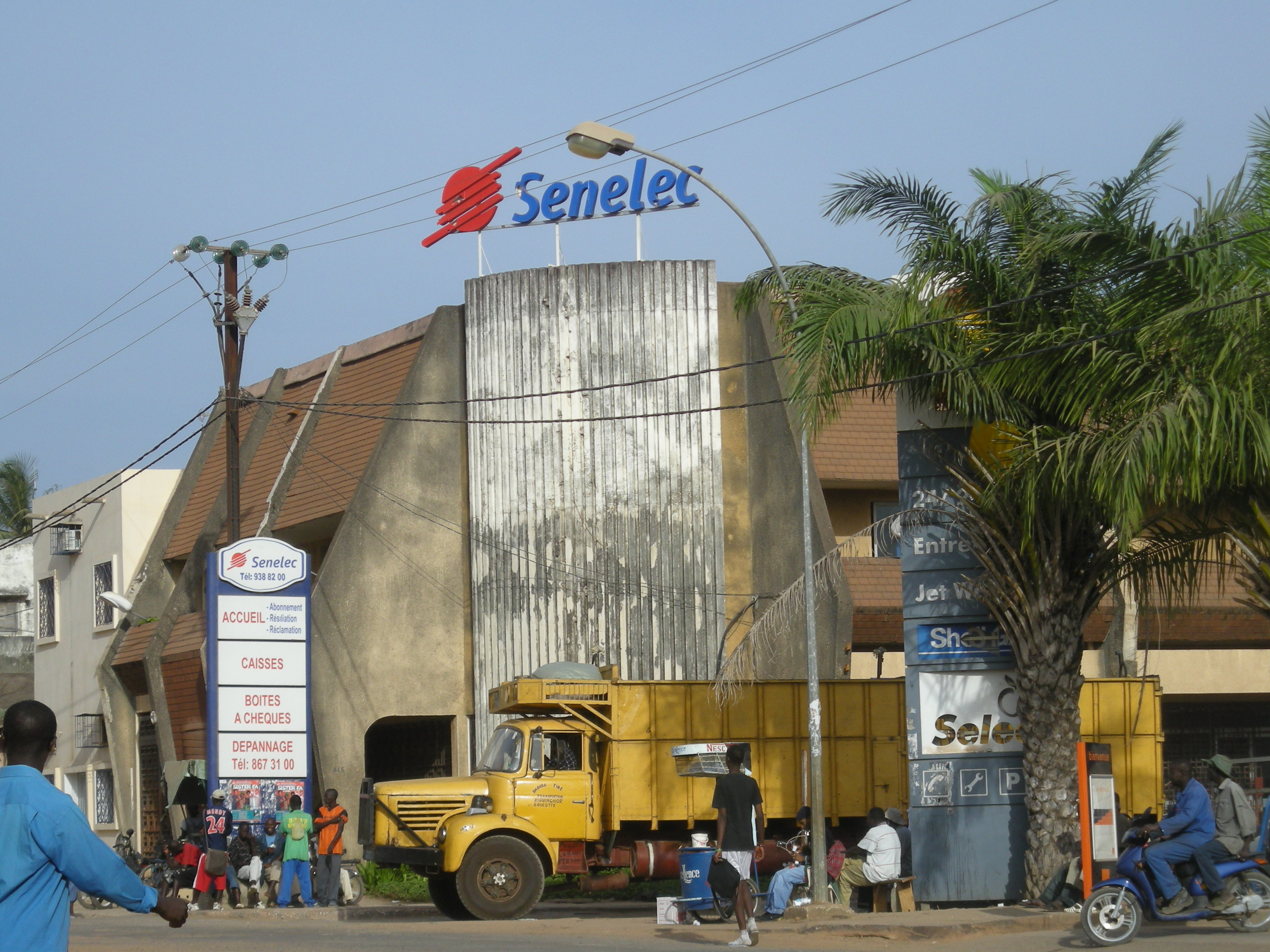
A Senelec agency at Ziguinchor in the Casamance region

Senelec (Société nationale d'électricité du Sénégal) is the national electricity company of Senegal.

== Administration ==
As of December 2025, the Director General of Senelec is M. Papa Toby Gaye. Senelec operates under a cadre institutionnel that positions it within the broader energy sector governance in Senegal. The energy sector in Senegal is regulated by the Ministry of Petroleum and Energies, which gives tutelage through bodies such as the Direction de l’Energie and the Commission de Régulation du Secteur de l’Energie (CRSE).

== History ==
Senelec was established in 1983 after the nationalization and merging of Électricité du Sénégal and Société sénégalaise de distribution d'électricité. In 1998, the Agency for Rural Electrification (ASER) and the Electricity Regulatory Board were split from Senelec and the company was put up for privatization. In 1999, the consortium of Hydro-Québec and Elyo (Suez Lyonnaise des Eaux) bought 34% of Senelec's shares. The deal was annulled by President Abdoulaye Wade in March 2000, and Hydro-Québec and Elyo withdrew from Senegal in January 2001.

The company represents Senegal in the West African Power Pool.

== Operations ==
Senelec has a production capacity of 632.9 MW, 90 MW of which comes from the Manantali Hydroelectric Power Plant in Mali; however, the electricity output is only 519.4 MW due to aging and faulty equipment. The company has 2,500 employees and 645,000 customers.

In 2006, Senelec got 88 billion CFA francs (US$185 million) of subsidies and its arrears alone amount to 1.5% of GDP.

Senelec planned a new coal-fired power station 35 km SE of Dakar, the Sendou power station, with a net capacity of 115 MW. This proposed coal-fired power plant was cancelled on December 12, 2019, as a result of the government's desire to comply with commitments made at COP21, known as the Paris Agreement, to reduce greenhouse gas emissions. The power plant will instead run on natural gas.

== See also ==
- Energy in Senegal
