= Colby =

Colby most often refers to:

- Colby (given name), a list of people
- Colby (surname), a list of people
- Colby cheese (originally 'Colby Cheddar'), a type of cheese made from cow's milk
  - Colby-Jack, a mixture of Colby and Monterey Jack cheeses

Colby may also refer to:

== Places ==
=== British Isles ===
- Colby, Cumbria, UK
- Colby, Norfolk, UK
- Colby Woodland Garden, Pembrokeshire, UK
- Colby, Isle of Man

=== United States ===
- Colby, Kansas, a city in Kansas
- Colby, Ohio, an unincorporated community
- Colby, Wisconsin, a city in Wisconsin
  - Colby (town), Wisconsin, a town in Clark County
- South Colby, Washington, an unincorporated community
- Colby College, a liberal arts college located in Waterville, Maine

== Geography ==
- Colby Lake (Chisago County, Minnesota)
- Colby Lake (Washington County, Minnesota)
- Colby Mountain (Tuolumne County, California)

== Culture ==
- Colby, a Franco-Belgian comic series from Michel Blanc-Dumont and Greg

=== Television ===
- The Colbys, the TV series, aired from 1985 until 1987 on ABC
- Colby's Clubhouse, the Christian TV series, aired from 1984 until 2000 on Trinity Broadcasting Network

== Other uses ==
- Colby, the ball in Bando (sport)
- Colby Nolan, a cat
- The Colby meteorite of 1917, which fell in Wisconsin, United States (see meteorite falls)

== See also ==
- Colby High School (disambiguation)
- Cobe (disambiguation)
- Coby (disambiguation)
- Colbie
- Coulby
- Kobe (disambiguation)
- Kobi (disambiguation)
- Kolby, place in Denmark
