= Coby =

Coby or Koby is a male and female name, a surname, or a nickname originating from the name "Jacob" or "Jakob".

== Notable people with the name "Coby" include ==
=== A ===
- Koby Abberton (born 1979), Australian surfer
- Koby Altman (born 1982), American basketball executive
- Koby Arthur (born 1996), Ghanaian footballer

=== B ===
- Coby Bell (born 1975), American actor and producer
- Koby Brea (born 2002), American basketball player
- Coby G. Brooks (born 1969), American businessman
- Coby Bryant (born 1999), American football player

=== C ===
- Coby Carrozza (born 2001), American swimmer
- Koby Clemens (born 1986), American baseball player
- Coby Cotton (born 1987), American media personality

=== D ===
- Coby Dietrick (born 1948), American basketball player

=== F ===
- Coby Fleener (born 1988), American football player

=== H ===
- Koby Holland (born 1974), American sports shooter

=== I ===
- Koby Israelite (born 1966), Israeli musician
- Coby Iwaasa (born 1996), Canadian racquetball player

=== J ===
- Coby Jones (born 2003), American soccer player

=== K ===
- Coby Karl (born 1983), American basketball player
- Koby Arthur Koomson (born 1951), Ghanaian diplomat

=== L ===
- Koby Lion (born 1976), Israeli paracyclist

=== M ===
- Koby Maxwell (born 1978), Ghanaian musician
- Coby Miller (born 1976), American track and field athlete

=== O ===
- Koby Osei-Wusu (born 1995), Ghanaian-American soccer player

=== R ===
- Coby Rhinehart (born 1977), American football player
- Coby Rowe (born 1995), English footballer

=== S ===
- Coby Sey, British musician
- Coby Sikkens (born 1946), Dutch swimmer
- Koby Stevens (born 1991), Australian rules footballer

=== T ===
- Coby Timp (1930–2025), Dutch actress

=== V ===
- Coby van Baalen (born 1957), Dutch equestrian

=== W ===
- Coby White (born 2000), American basketball player
- Coby Whitmore (1913–1988), American painter

== Surname ==
- Doug Coby (born 1979), American racing driver
- Fred Coby (1916–1970), American actor
- George Coby (1883–1967), Georgian businessman
- Jeff Coby (born 1994), Haitian-American basketball player
- Rudy Coby (born 1964), American magician

== See also ==
- Cobe (disambiguation), a disambiguation page for "Cobe"
- Cobie, a page for the given name "Cobie"
- Cobi (disambiguation), a disambiguation page for "Cobi"
- Jacob (given name), a page for the given name "Jacob"
- Kobe (given name), a page for the given name "Kobe"
- Kobe (surname), a page for the surname "Kobe"
- Kobi (given name), a page for the given name "Kobi"
