= Coby (disambiguation) =

Coby is a given name and surname.

Coby may also refer to:

- Coby (musician) (born 1985), a Serbian rapper
- Coby (One Piece), a fictional character
- Coby Electronics Corporation, an American manufacturer of consumer electronics
- Coby Hall, an historic residence in Florence, Alabama, U.S.

== See also ==
- Cobe (disambiguation)
- Cobie, a Dutch feminine given name
- Cobi (disambiguation)
- Kobe (disambiguation)
- Kobi (disambiguation)
