= Colby Lake =

Colby Lake may refer to:

- Colby Lake (Chisago County, Minnesota)
- Colby Lake (Washington County, Minnesota)
