= Lichtenstein (surname) =

Lichtenstein is a surname shared by:

== Princely house ==
- List of princes of Liechtenstein
- List of princesses consort of Liechtenstein

== In arts and media ==
- Alfred Lichtenstein (writer), German writer
- Bill Lichtenstein, journalist and producer
- David Lichine, born David Liechtenstein, Russian-American ballet dancer and choreographer
- Harvey Lichtenstein, American arts administrator
- Roy Lichtenstein, painter

== In religion ==
- Aharon Lichtenstein, Orthodox rabbi
- Ignatz Lichtenstein, Hungarian rabbi (also Isaac L.)
- Morris Lichtenstein, rabbi, founder of the Jewish Science

== In science and mathematics ==
- Anton August Heinrich Lichtenstein (1753–1816), German zoologist
- Hinrich Lichtenstein (1780–1857), also known as Martin Lichtenstein, German botanist and zoologist
- Leon Lichtenstein, Polish-German mathematician

== In other fields ==
- Alfred Lichtenstein (philatelist), American philatelist
- Benyamin Lichtenstein, American professor
- David Lichtenstein, American businessperson
- Ilya Lichtenstein, Bitfinex thief
- James Lichtenstein, American high diver
- Kobi Lichtenstein, Israeli-Brazilian martial artist
- Nelson Lichtenstein, labor historian
- Warren Lichtenstein, American businessman and philanthropist

== See also ==
- Lichtenstein (disambiguation)
