= Goby (disambiguation) =

A goby is a small fish whose pelvic fins are fused to form a disc-shaped sucker.

Goby may also refer to:

- Goby (search engine), a travel ticket search engine
- Goby, Virginia, an unincorporated area in the United States
- Goby Lake, in Palau
- Goby Eberhardt (1852–1926), German violinist
- W. J. Gobrecht (born 1931), American football player and coach
- Goby, on the American/Canadian animated television series Bubble Guppies

== See also ==
- Gobi (disambiguation)
