= Kobe (given name) =

Given name of multiple origins

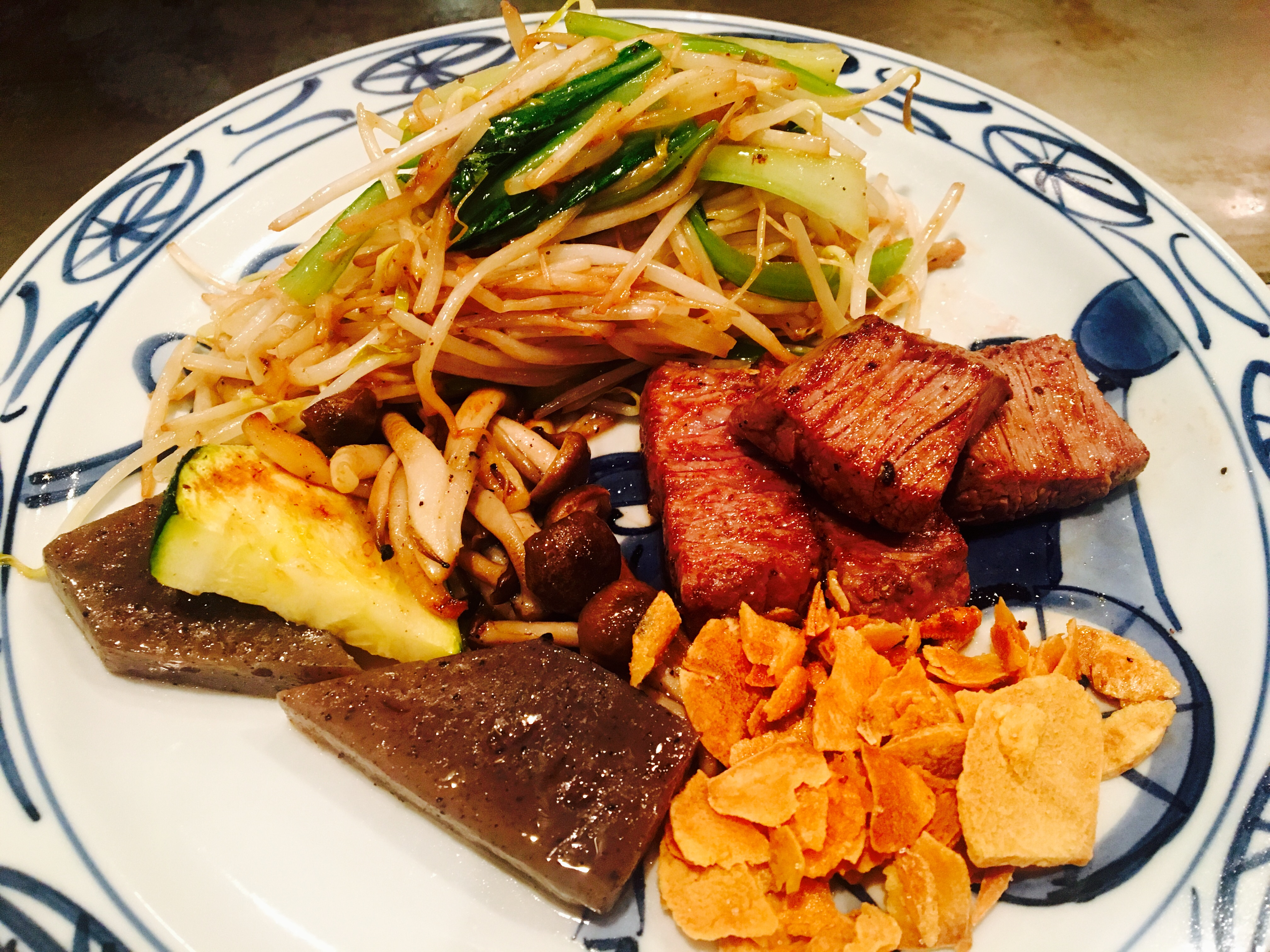
- Kobe Bryant, who popularized the name, was named after Kobe beef.
- Pronunciation: /ˈkoʊbi/ KOH-bee
- Gender: Unisex
- Language: English, Greek, Hebrew, Dutch, Swahili, Latin, Akan, Japanese KOH-bay
- Name day: 25 July

Origin
- Origin: Ancient Hebrew, Early common era Japan, Akan (Ghana, Ivory Coast, Togo & Jamaica)
- Meaning: Supplanter, God's door, God may protect, tortoise, Tuesday born, friendliness, ocean etc.

Other names
- Alternative spelling: Cobe, Cobie, Coby, Colbie, Colby, Koby, Kobbi, Kobi
- Nickname: Ko
- See also: Kobe (disambiguation)

Kobe (Hebrew: קובי, romanized: Kóbi; Greek: Κόμπε, romanized: Kómpe; Japanese: 神戸, romanized: Kōbe) is a unisex given name that has multiple origins and meanings. Origins include Hebrew, Dutch, Swahili, Japanese, Akan and Greek origins. Alternate spellings of this name are Cobe, Cobie, Coby, Colbie, Colby, Koby, Kobbi and Kobi.

== Origins ==
In Ancient Hebrew times, the name "Koby" was used as a pet-name for Jacob. The Hebrew meaning is rooted to the words Yakov (Jacob) meaning "Yahweh (God) may protect. It can also be translated to "Supplanter" from the late Latin word "Iacobus" which is rooted to the Greek lakobos (Ἰάκωβος) which is connected to the base name Jacob and used as a diminutive (nickname) form for Jacob.

The Swahili meaning of the name Kobe translates to "tortoise" or "turtle". The Dutch meaning is similar to the Hebrew meaning but the name is a diminutive for Jakob instead of Jacob.

In Akan culture, "Kobi", "Kobbi", "Kobby" is a diminutive of "Kobina" or "Kwabena". The Akan meaning of Kwabena means "Tuesday born male", following their day naming system. People born on particular days are supposed to exhibit the characteristics or attributes and philosophy, associated with the days. In the case of Tuesday borns, they are associated with the ocean. Kwabena has the appellation Ogyam or Ebo meaning friendliness.

== Popularity ==
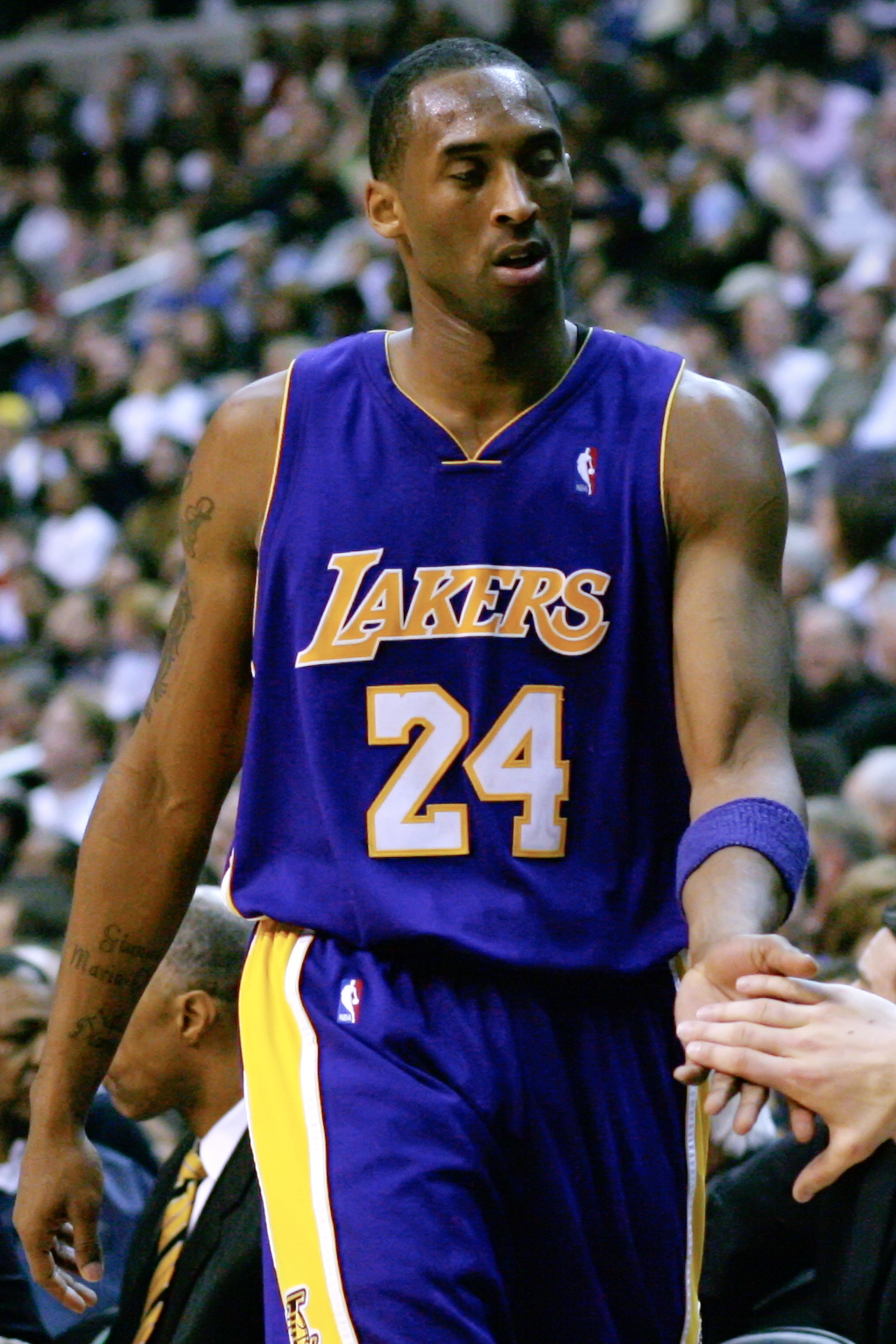
Kobe Bryant

The use of the name has spiked with the popularity of American basketball player Kobe Bryant, with 14,000 children being given the name over his 20-year NBA career. He was named after Kobe beef when his parents spotted it on a menu. Between 1985 and 1995 there were only 14 recorded births in the United States given this name. Later, there were 87 born with this name in 1996, the year in which Bryant was drafted into the NBA. According to the United states social security statistics from 2000 to 2018 it has declined in popularity in the United States, starting in the top 300, but down to 574th most common name in 2018.

== Notable people with the name include ==
- Kobe Brown (born 2000), American basketball player
- Kobe Bryant (1978–2020), American basketball player
- Kobe Bufkin (born 2003), American basketball player
- Kobe Goossens (born 1996), Belgian cyclist
- Kobe Hetherington (born 1999), Australian rugby league footballer
- Kobe Hernandez-Foster (born 2002), American soccer player
- Kobe Hudson (born 2001), American football player
- Kobe Johnson (born 2003), American basketball player
- Kobe Jones (born 1998), American football player
- Kobe Lewis (born 2000), American football player
- Kobee Minor (born 2002), American football player
- Kobe Mutch (born 1998), Australian rules footballer
- Kobe Paras (born 1997), Filipino basketball player
- Kobe Perez (born 1997), American soccer player
- Kobe Prentice (born 2004), American football player
- Kobe Sanders (born 2002), American basketball player
- Kobe Savage (born 2001), American football player
- Kobe Smith (born 1998), American football player
- Kobe Tai, American pornographic actress
- Kobie Turner (born 1999), American football player
- Kobe McDonald (born 2007), Irish gaelic footballer

== See also ==
- Kobe (surname)
- Kobe (disambiguation), including people known by the mononym
- Coby, given name and surname
