= George Floyd protests in Minnesota =

Local civil unrest over murder of unarmed black man

- Part of George Floyd protests
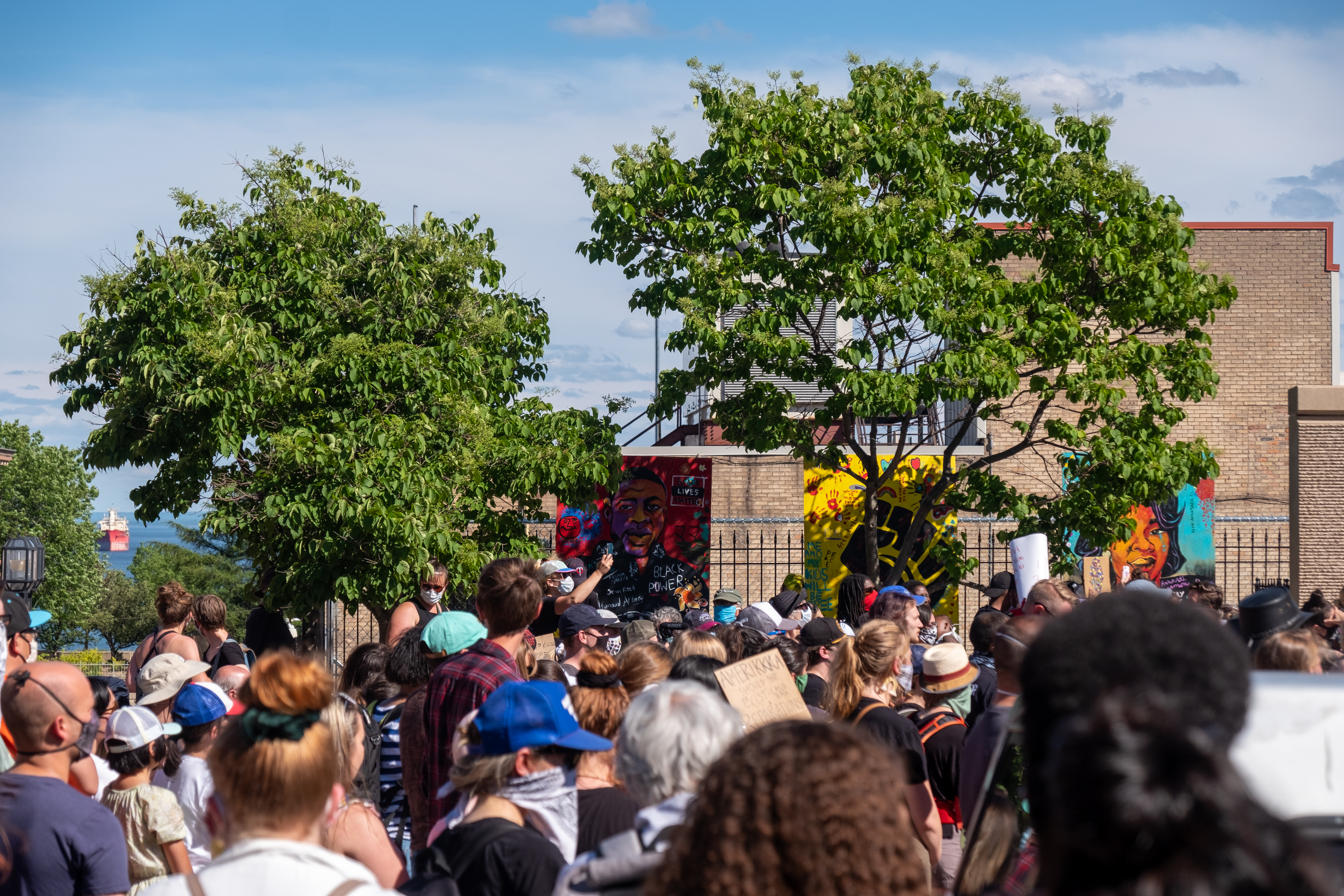
- Protesters march in Duluth, Minnesota, June 19, 2020
- Date: May 26, 2020 – May 2, 2023 (2 years, 11 months and 1 week)
- Location: Various locations in the U.S. state of Minnesota
- Caused by: Reaction to the murder of George Floyd by the Minneapolis Police Department; Institutional racism against African Americans; Economic, racial and social inequality
- Goals: Justice for George Floyd; End to police brutality
- Methods: Protests, demonstrations, civil disobedience, civil resistance
- Status: Concluded: All four officers convicted

Cities in Minnesota in which a protest with about 100 or more participants was held, with Minneapolis and Saint Paul in red

Civil unrest over the murder of George Floyd began as local protests in Minneapolis–Saint Paul on May 26, 2020, the day after George Floyd was killed by a Minneapolis police officer. Protests and civil disorder quickly spread to other locations in the U.S. state of Minnesota, the United States, and internationally. This list includes notable protests and events of civil disorder in Minnesota in the aftermath of Floyd's murder.

== Locations ==
=== Albert Lea ===
On June 2, hundreds of protesters rallied for police accountability in Albert Lea at the Freeborn County Courthouse and then marched around town despite severely hot weather. Director of Public Safety JD Carlson told protesters that he did not support Chauvin's actions against Floyd in Minneapolis, and offered an open door between the community and the police department. Freeborn County Sheriff Kurt Freitag expressed concern for the protesters, and recommended that they come prepared with water and sun protection if protesting in summer.

=== Anoka ===
On June 1, dozens of protesters gathered near the Rum River Bridge to peacefully protest the murder of George Floyd. Anoka County Sheriff James Stuart spoke in support of the protest. Several local officials attended the event, including Minnesota State Senator Jim Abeler.

=== Apple Valley ===
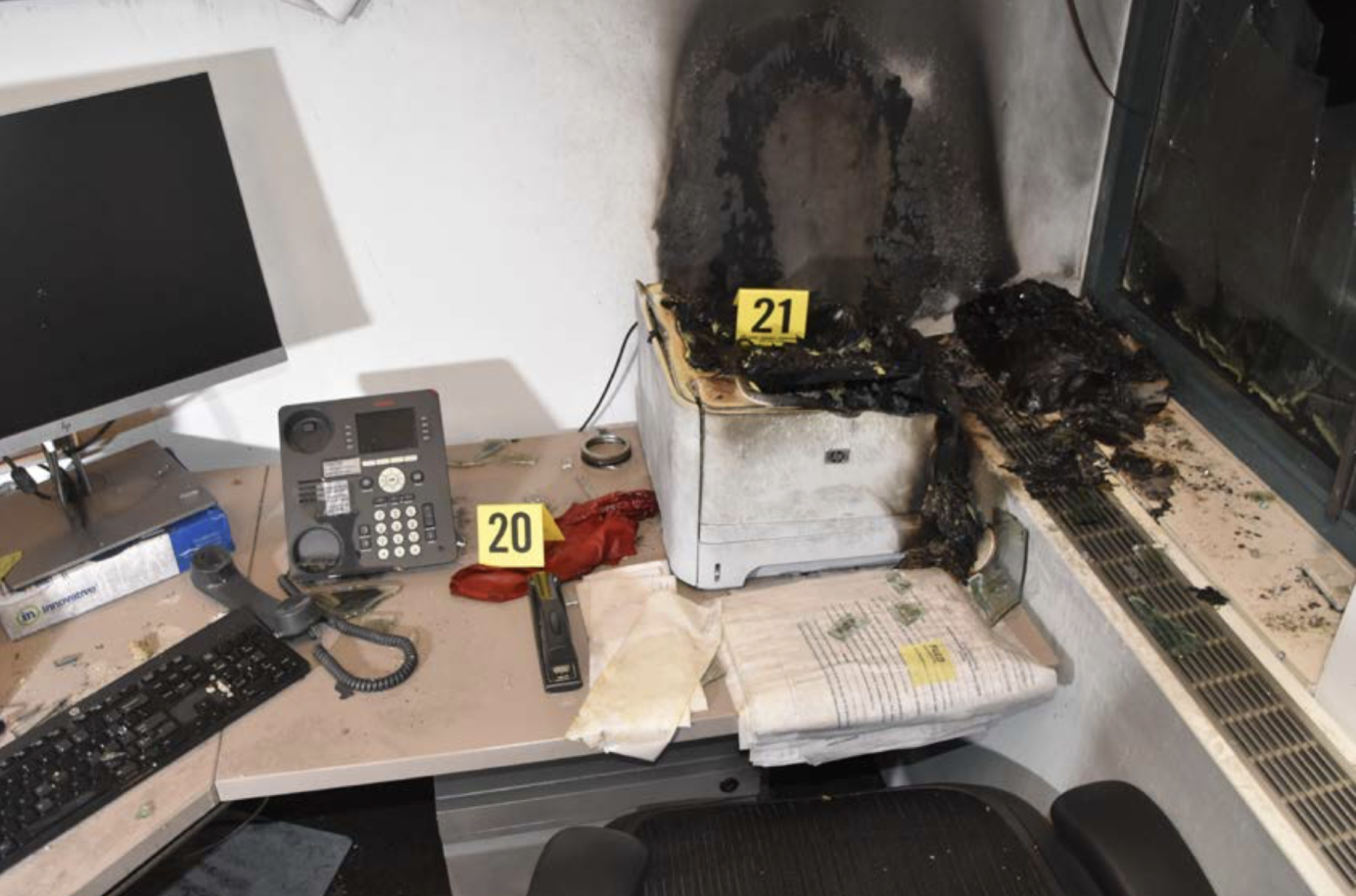
FBI photo of the Dakota County Western Government Center arson attack, May 29, 2020.

On May 29, during the early morning hours, Minnesota residents Fornandous Cortez Henderson of Savage and Garrett Ziegler of Long Lake attacked the Dakota County Western Service Center in Apple Valley—a local government building that contained a U.S. passport office, court rooms, and other official services. Henderson had targeted the building as revenge for the appearances he made before a court located inside it and because he was angry with law enforcement over Floyd's murder. The two men broke several windows with baseball bats and threw Molotov cocktails inside. Some of the incendiary devices ignited and caused fire and smoke damage. The men also poured flammable liquids around the building and attempted to start other fires. Law enforcement that responded to a building alarm arrested Ziegler and Henderson as they fled on foot.

=== Austin ===
On May 31, approximately 300 protesters rallied at Bandshell Community Park in Austin and marched to the law enforcement center before returning to the park and disbanding. Another protest occurred on the July 25.

=== Bemidji ===
On May 30, between 300 and 500 protesters marched from Paul Bunyan Park to the Bemidji Police Department; the demonstration was peaceful until some protesters attacked a D.A.R.E. truck, which then backed into a crowd of demonstrators and mildly injured an event volunteer. After the protest, mayor Rita Albrecht signed a declaration of a curfew between 8:00 p.m. and 6:00 a.m.

=== Bloomington ===
On July 5, the 10K Foundation organized a march from the Mall of America in Bloomington to the George Floyd memorial site in downtown Minneapolis.

=== Brainerd ===
On May 29, over 60 people gathered at a busy intersection in Brainerd to support Black Lives Matter and protest the murder of George Floyd.

=== Duluth ===
On May 28, around 100 protesters in Duluth blocked traffic at a busy intersection to protest the murder of George Floyd. On May 30, several hundred protesters temporarily blocked portions of Interstate 35. Several highways closed, including Interstate 35, Interstate 394, Interstate 94 and Highway 55. A curfew from 10 p.m. CDT through 6 p.m. CDT Sunday morning was imposed by Duluth city leaders.

On May 31, more than 1,000 protesters marched on I-35. Eight properties were damaged including an expletive written on the ground below the Clayton Jackson McGhie Memorial for historical lynching victims.

On June 19, hundreds marched in Duluth for Juneteenth.

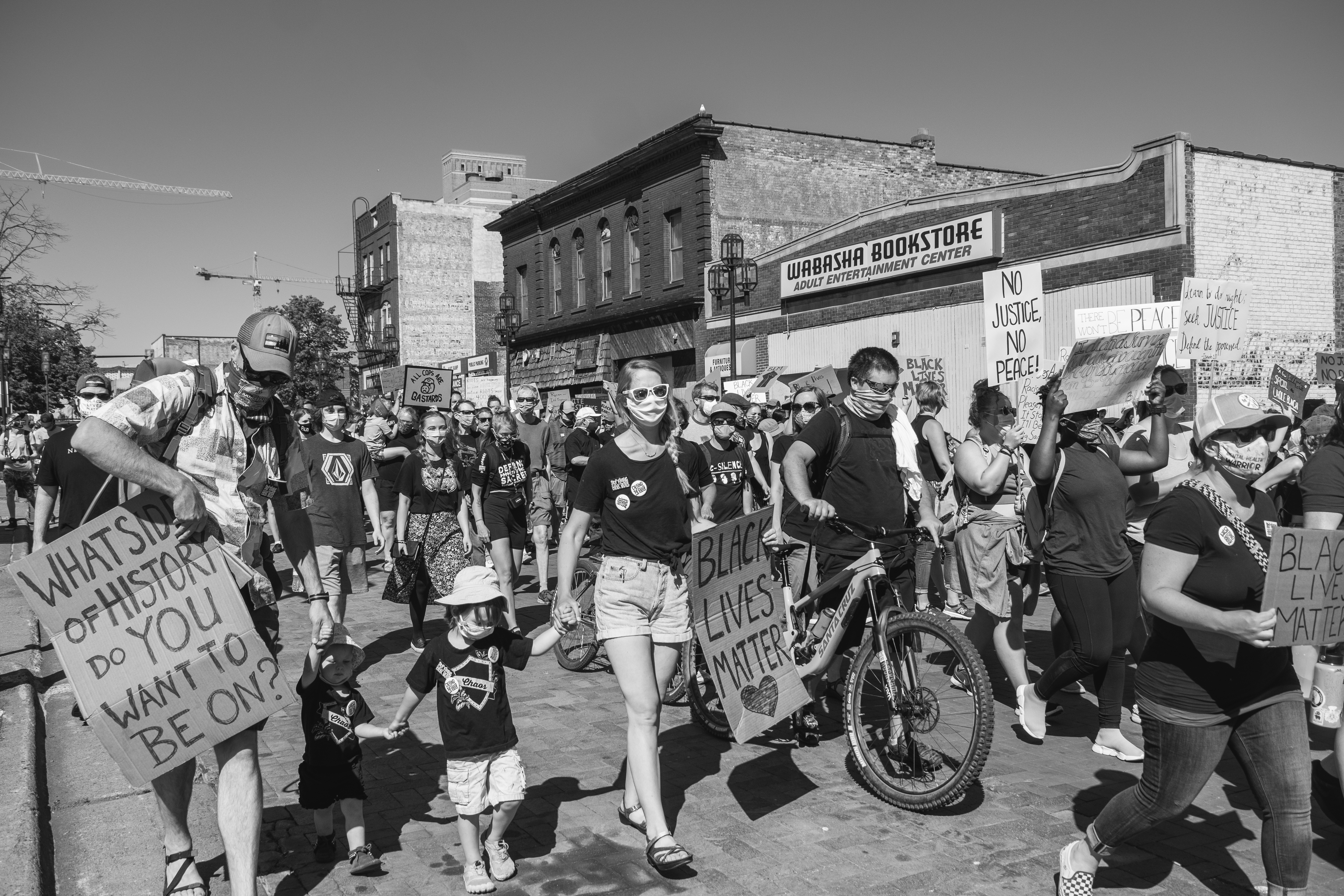
Protest march in Duluth on June 19, 2020.

=== Ely ===
On June 6, in Ely, approximately 250 protesters marched down Chapman Street from Central Avenue to Whiteside Park in support of Black Lives Matter. The protest was peaceful with no incidents of violence. Once arriving at the park, most protesters kneeled in silence for 8 minutes 46 seconds.

=== Forest Lake ===
On June 4 in Forest Lake, roughly 300 protesters marched from the local high school to Lakeside Memorial Park. At the park, the protesters held a moment of silence followed by an open mic to discuss racism nationally and in the Forest Lake area. During the march, a handful of counter-protesters in trucks displayed American flags and a Trump flag, prompting local police to park a fire engine truck to separate the groups. Following the park gathering, many participants deviated from the planned march route back to the high school, instead taking to Highway 61, a primary thoroughfare through the town. On the way, approximately 40 protesters stopped at the Forest Lake City Center, with the Forest Lake Police Chief Rick Peterson describing "a select few individuals" as "unruly." No arrests or citations were made.

=== Grand Marais ===
On May 29, roughly 80 protesters lined Highway 61 in Grand Marais to protest police brutality. The rally remained peaceful.

=== Glencoe ===
On June 2, close to 150 protesters attended a rally outside the McLeod County Courthouse in Glencoe.

=== Mankato ===
On May 29, hundreds of protesters marched through downtown Mankato in a peaceful demonstration. The rally began at Veterans Memorial Bridge and went through Washington park and to the Mankato Public Safety Center.

=== Marshall ===
On June 3, a crowd of over 200 people marched down East College Drive from Memorial Park in downtown Marshall and then back down East College Drive and through downtown. The protest remained peaceful and was a major emphasis by the organizers of the protest despite several local businesses closing early in anticipation of the protests.

=== Minneapolis–Saint Paul ===
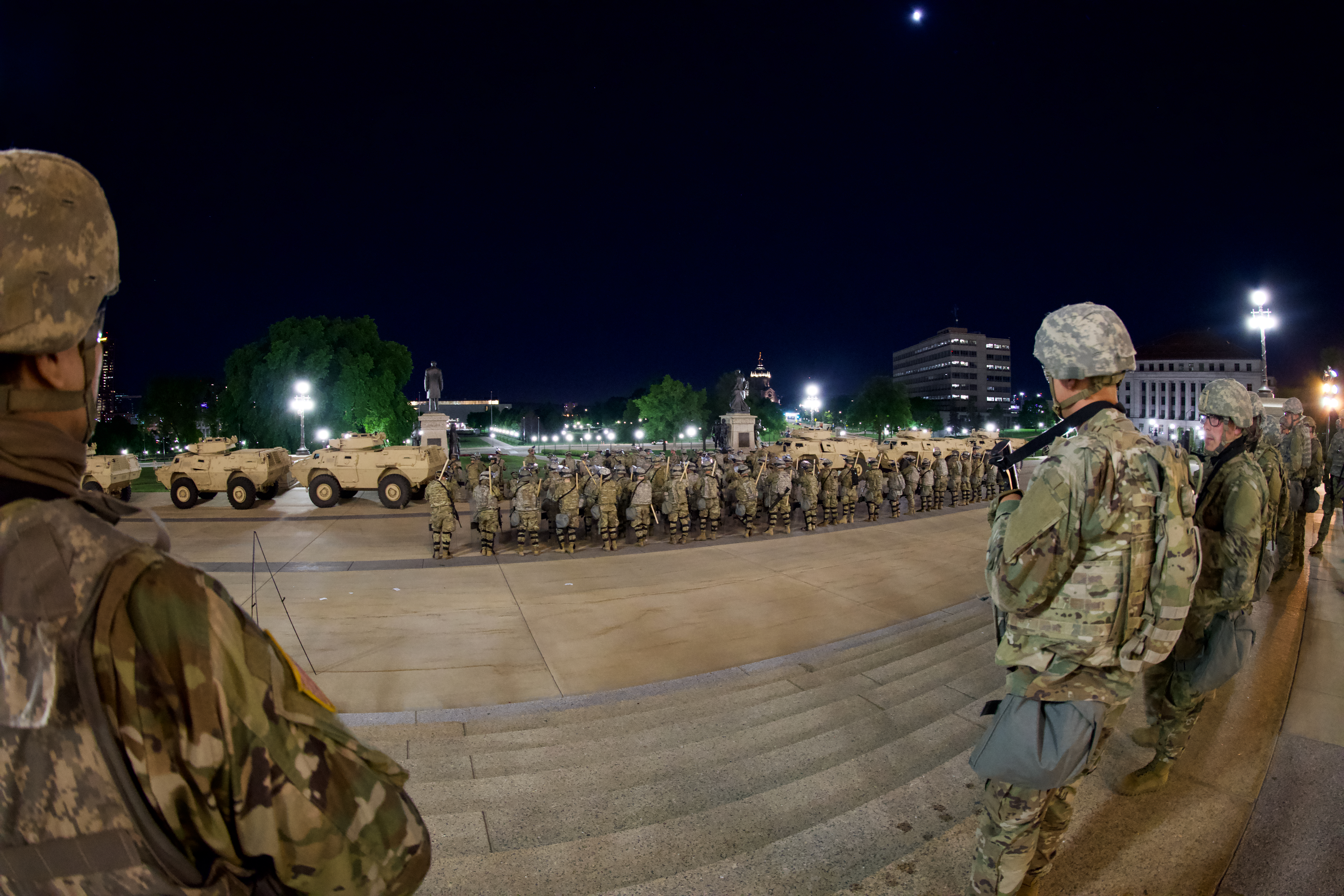
Minnesota National Guard and local law enforcement standing guard at the Minnesota State Capitol building in St. Paul on May 30

The first George Floyd protests took place in Minneapolis on May 26 – the day after his murder by Minneapolis police officers – and spread to neighboring St. Paul. On May 28, after protests turned violent, Minneapolis Mayor Jacob Frey declared a state of emergency and Minnesota Governor Tim Walz activated the Minnesota National Guard.

On June 9, Minnesota Governor Tim Walz issued a statewide proclamation declaring 8 minutes 46 seconds of silence at 11:00 a.m. CDT to coincide with the beginning of Floyd's funeral in Houston, Texas. The length of time was how long Minneapolis police officer Derek Chauvin was originally reported to have pinned Floyd on the pavement using his knee.

=== New Ulm ===
On May 30, over a dozen people spontaneously gathered at the intersection of Center Street and Broadway in New Ulm and peacefully demonstrated.

=== Oakdale ===
On May 28, protesters gathered outside the home of Derek Chauvin. Six demonstrators were arrested for unlawful assembly.

=== Owatonna ===
On May 31, over 200 protesters demonstrated in Owatonna along Hoffman Drive to show solidarity with George Floyd. They traveled to the Law Enforcement Center, where they spoke with officers from Owatonna and from neighboring counties. They also held a moment of silence for 8 minutes 46 seconds to honor Floyd.

=== Rochester ===
On May 29, over 150 protesters marched from Soldiers Field to the Government Center building and back to protest the murder of George Floyd. On June 7, protesters marched from Silver Lake to the Olmsted County Government Center.

=== St. Cloud ===
On May 29, after hundreds of people gathered for a memorial for George Floyd at Lake George, a portion of the crowd marched through downtown St. Cloud, stopping at the Stearns County Courthouse to hold a moment of silence for Floyd before turning back to Lake George.

=== Woodbury ===
On June 1, a group of about 40 protesters gathered in Ojibway Park in Woodbury to rally against police brutality. Another protest took place on June 4 as protesters marched from Colby Lake to Woodbury City Hall.

== See also ==
- History of Minnesota
- List of civil unrest in Minneapolis–Saint Paul
