= Kobi (given name) =

Kobi is a given name. It is an alternative spelling of Coby, which itself is a nickname for Jacob. Notable people with the name include:

== Given name ==
- Kobi Alexander (born 1952), American businessman, founder of Comverse Technology
- Kobi Baladev (born 1965), Israeli footballer
- Kobi Dajani (born 1984), Israeli footballer
- Kobi Hassan (born 1978), Israeli footballer
- Kobi Karp (born 1962), American architect
- Kobi Lichtenstein (born 1964), Israeli master of krav maga
- Kobi Metzer, Israeli economic historian
- Kobi Moyal (born 1987), Israeli footballer
- Kobi Nachtailer (born 1978), Israeli footballer
- Kobi Oshrat (born 1944), Israeli composer and conductor
- Kobi Oz (born 1969), lead singer of the Israeli group Teapacks
- Kobi Peretz (born 1975), Israeli singer
- Kobi Refua (born 1974), Israeli footballer
- Kobi Simmons (born 1997), American basketball player for Maccabi Tel Aviv of the Israeli Basketball Premier League

== Nickname ==
- Köbi Kuhn (Jakob Kuhn, 1943–2019), Swiss footballer and football manager

== See also ==
- Kobe (disambiguation)
