= Lichtenstein =

Liechtenstein is a country in Europe.

Lichtenstein or Liechtenstein may also refer to:

- House of Liechtenstein, the ruling family of Liechtenstein

== Places ==
- Lichtenstein, Saxony, a town in Saxony, Germany
- Lichtenstein, Baden-Württemberg, a municipality in Baden-Württemberg, Germany
- Lichtenstein Castle (Greifenstein), castle in Hesse, Germany
- Lichtenstein Castle (Lower Franconia), castle in Bavaria, Germany
- Lichtenstein Castle (Württemberg), in Baden-Württemberg, Germany
- Liechtenstein Castle, in Lower Austria (after which the family and the country are named)
- Lichtenstein (Osterode am Harz), a hill in Lower Saxony

== Other uses ==
- Lichtenstein (novel), an 1826 novel by Wilhelm Hauff
- Lichtenstein (surname)
- Liechtenstein Museum or Liechtenstein collection, of the princely family
- Lichtenstein radar, World War II German radar system

== See also ==
- Lichtensteig, a municipality in the Swiss canton of St. Gallen
