= Kobes =

Kobes is a surname. Notable people with the surname include:

- Jonathan A. Kobes (born 1974), American judge
- Kristin Kobes Du Mez (fl. 1997), American historian
- Tomáš Kobes (born 1978), Czech slalom canoeist

== See also ==
- Kobe (surname)
