= Marching Pride of North Alabama =

Marching band of the University of North Alabama

- School: University of North Alabama
- Location: Florence, Alabama, USA
- Conference: Big South Conference
- Founded: 1949
- Director: Dr. Joseph Gray
- Members: 265

The Marching Pride of North Alabama, is the official marching band of the University of North Alabama. The band, which is the largest organization on campus, performs at all North Alabama Lions football home games, as well as local parades and high school competition exhibitions across the state. They performed in the Macy's Thanksgiving Day Parade in 2025.

== History ==
=== Beginnings ===
The band began as the Tri-Cities Band directed by Dr.William Presser in 1947. UNA (then called Florence State Teachers College), started its first official college band in 1949, when President E.B. Norton brought football back to the campus. Presser took the position of choral director at the school, and Dr. Robert Nye, a new music teacher, became the band's director. Twenty-seven students, out of the 1,400 attending the school, formed the first marching band.

Its first rehearsal took place on September 24, 1949, and performed the show Saturday, October, 22 at the FSTC/Livingston (now the University of West Alabama) game.

=== 1950s ===
During the summer of 1950, uniforms were ordered. Dr. Wayne Christeson became band director when Dr. Nye left FSTC to take a position at the University of Oregon. The band began practicing on the practice field, which is still in use today on what is now Pine Street. He also saw the band grow to forty-four members in 1954. Florence State Teachers College became Florence State College in 1957. In 1961, when Dr. Christeson decided to devote his time to being chair of the Department of Music.

Mr. Kenneth Large was hired as the new band director. When he started, there were only 17 band students, but he soon raised the number of the band to 50 students.

=== 1960s ===
In December 1961, the band made its first appearance in the Birmingham Veterans Day Parade. A job offer drew Mr. Large away from Florence State. In 1966, Arthur Theil took over the Florence State College's band in 1965, and named the band the Pride of Dixie. The band numbered 70 when Large left but only 46 when Theil took over; in his second year, it increased to 80. Florence State College became Florence State University in 1968. After practicing in the Stone Lodge, or Band Lodge, for twenty years the band moved to its new home, the Lurleen Wallace Fine Arts Center in 1969.

=== 1970s ===
In 1970, Theil left the school, and Dr. Frank McArthur was hired to direct the bands. Under his direction, the band won the Birmingham Veterans Day Parade best university band contest on October 22, 1973. The school changed name again to change from FSU to the University of North Alabama in 1975. In 1975, Dr. James K. Simpson, previously assistant band director, took over the position in 1975. In 1976, the band received an invitation to perform in the Blue/Gray Bowl game. In 1978, Dr. Edd Jones took over as director of bands.

=== Today ===
Dr, Lloyd Jones, the director until 2026, began assisting with the band in 1996. Members of the concert and jazz band performed at the Alabama Music Educators Association conference at Auburn University in the spring of 1997. The marching band has made twenty-four consecutive NCAA Division II National Football Championship Game appearances. Dr. Edd Jones retired August 1, 2000 as director of bands and continued to teach in the department in an adjunct capacity until his death in 2020.

The North Alabama Marching Pride performed in Alabama Governor Bob Riley's Second Inaugural Parade on January 15, 2007 in Montgomery. They also performed in the Inaugural Parade for Alabama Governor Robert J. Bentley on January 19, 2015.

Since 2011, the North Alabama Marching Pride has performed exhibitions for Bands of America. They have performed in Atlanta and Indianapolis for these events.

The North Alabama Marching Pride was invited to perform at the 99th Macy's Thanksgiving Day Parade taking place on November 27, 2025.

In Winter 2026, Dr. Lloyd E. Jones III retired from the Director of Bands position. Dr. Joseph Gray was selected from a hiring and interview process as the new Director of Bands.

== Organization ==
The band performs at games throughout the football season. Its affiliates, The Majorettes, Lionettes (dance line), and Color Guard are a part of each halftime show.

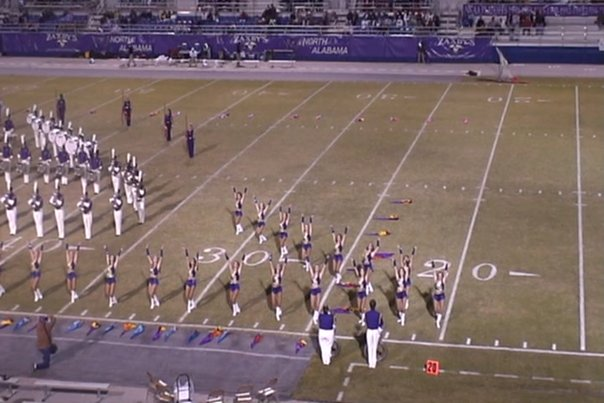
Opener Featurette 2006

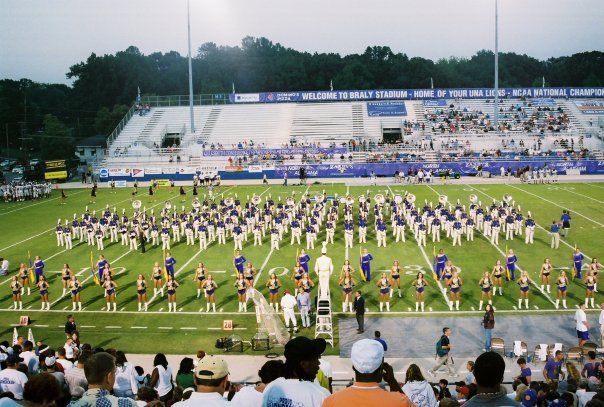
Pre-Game 2006

The UNA Lionettes are the dance line which performs as a part of the North Alabama Marching Pride Marching Band; the UNA Majorettes are considered an integral part of the band; the UNA Color Guard provides visual impact for the band.

The Jazz Band is a select part of the band that represents UNA in a number of performances, including an annual concert tour of area high schools.

Additional performing opportunities are provided by the Jazz Combo, the Percussion Ensemble, the Brass Ensemble and the Woodwind Ensemble. All performing groups at the University are a part of the school curriculum, and members receive academic credit. The groups are supervised and taught by experienced and interested faculty members.
