= Jacoba =

Jacoba is a given name, a female version of Jacob. In daily life, many people use(d) short or more modern forms like Coba, Cobi, Cobie, Coby, Coosje, Cootje, Jackie, and Jacqueline. People with the name include

Middle Ages

- Jacoba of Settesoli (Giacoma de Settesoli; 1190–1273), follower of the Italian saint Francis of Assisi
- Jacoba of Beieren (1401–1436), Countess of Holland and Zeeland
- Jacoba of Loon-Heinsberg (fl. 1446), Dutch abbess

Modern use

- Jacoba M.J. "Coby" van Baalen (born 1957), Dutch equestrian
- Jacoba van den Brande (1735–1794), Dutch scientist
- Jacoba W.H. "Coosje" van Bruggen (1942–2009), Dutch-born American sculptor, art historian, and critic
- Jacoba van Heemskerck (1876–1923), Dutch painter, stained glass designer and graphic artist
- Jacoba Hol (1886–1964), physical geographer
- Jacoba Adriana Hollestelle (1937–2002), Dutch singer known by the name Conny Vandenbos
- Jacoba Maria van Nickelen (c.1690–1749), Dutch flower painter
- Jacoba Johanna "Coba" Ritsema (1876–1961), Dutch portrait painter
- Jacoba Catharina "Cobie" Sikkens (born 1946), Dutch swimmer
- Jacoba F.M. "Cobie" Smulders (born 1982), Canadian actress and model
- Jacoba Stelma (1907–1987), Dutch gymnast
- Jacoba Surie (1879–1970), Dutch painter
- Jacoba van Tongeren (1903–1967), Dutch World War II resistance fighter
- Jacoba van Velde (1903–1985), Dutch novelist
