= Coulby =

Coulby is a surname and occasional given name. Notable people with this name include:

- Angel Coulby (born 1980), English actress
- Harry Coulby (1865–1929), American businessman
- Coulby Gunther (1923–2005), American paratrooper and basketball player and coach
- Coulby Riehl (1997 - present), https://savethegingers.com/

== See also ==
- Coulby Newham, a place in Middlesbrough, England
- Colby
