= Gobi (disambiguation) =

The Gobi is the largest desert region in Asia.

Gobi may also refer to:

- GOBI, a selective primary child health care approach
- Gobi bear, a subspecies of the brown bear
- Gobi (fish), the type species for the genus Platycephalus
- GGobi, a statistical software tool used for graphing various types of data
- Gobichettipalayam, a town in Tamil Nadu, India
- Osmunda japonica, Asian royal fern
- Qualcomm Gobi, a mobile broadband technology
- Gobi (dog), a small stray dog found in the Gobi Desert by marathon runner Dion Leonard, and later adopted by him
- The Gobi Desert (novel), a 1941 novel by Pierre Benoit
- Gobi Avedian, Malaysian drug offender jailed in Singapore
- GOBI Library Solutions, a book vendor owned by EBSCO Industries

== See also ==
- Govi (disambiguation)
- Goby (disambiguation)
- Kobi (disambiguation)
- Aloo gobi, Indian dish of potatoes and cauliflower
- Gobhi paratha, Indian cauliflower flatbread
