= Lichtenstein (Osterode am Harz) =

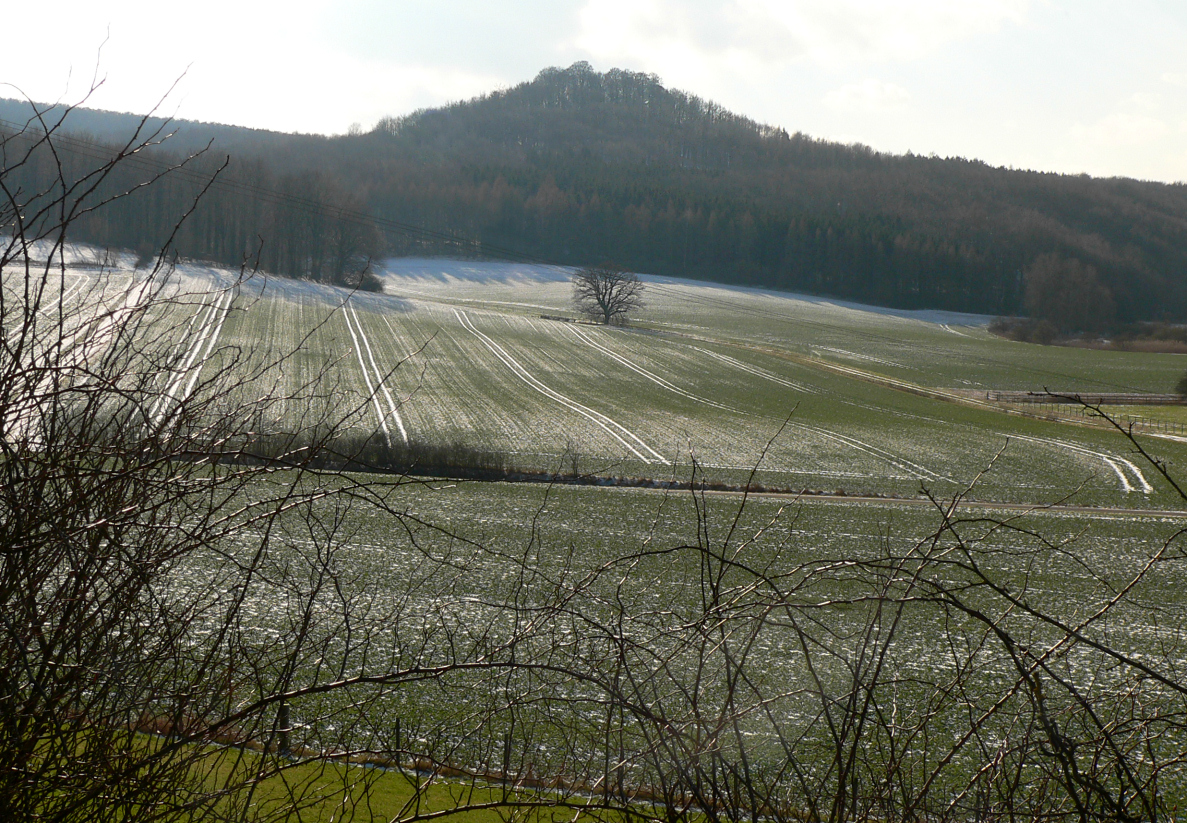
- View of the Lichtenstein from the NE

Highest point
- Elevation: 260.9 m above sea level (NHN) (856 ft)
- Listing: – Karstlandscape – Ruins of Lichtenstein Castle – Lichtenstein Cave
- Coordinates: 51°43′16″N 10°10′33″E

Geography
- Location within Lower Saxony
- Location: nahe Osterode am Harz; Göttingen, Lower Saxony (Germany)

Geology
- Rock type(s): Lower Bunter sandstone, Gypsum karst

The Lichtenstein is a hill, 260.9 m above sea level (NHN), in the southwestern Harz Foreland. It rises near Osterode am Harz in the Lower Saxon county of Göttingen.

There is a formation of Lower Bunter sandstone on the hill as well as the remains of Lichtenstein Castle. It is also the site of the Lichtenstein Cave.

== Geography ==
=== Location ===
The Lichtenstein rises southwest of the Harz mountains between Förste to the north, Osterode am Harz to the east-northeast, Ührde to the southeast and Dorste to the south-southwest; it belongs entirely to the Osterode borough, the town itself being 5.3 (as the crow flies) east-northeast of the summit. The Söse tributary, the Salza, flows past the hill to the west. The hill's southwestern spur is the Badenhäuser Berg (221.6 m).
