= Govi =

Govi may refer to:

- Govi-Altai Province, province of Mongolia
- Govi-Ugtaal, district of Dundgovi Province in central Mongolia

== Persons ==
- Govi (musician), new age/ambient Hawaiian-German musician
- Anselmo Govi, Italian painter and decorator
- Gilberto Govi, Italian actor
- Sergio Adolfo Govi, Italian Roman Catholic bishop

== See also ==
- Gobi (disambiguation)
