= Cobie =

Cobie is a Dutch female given name, a short form of Jacoba. It may refer to:

- Cobie Buter (born 1946), Dutch swimmer
- Cobie Floor (1930–2017), Dutch diver
- Cobie Sikkens (born 1946), Dutch swimmer
- Cobie Smulders (born 1982), Canadian actress
- Cobie-Jane Morgan (born 1989), Australian rugby union player

== See also ==
- Cobie Durant (born 1998), American football player
- Cobie Legrange (born 1942), South African golfer
- COBie
