= University of North Alabama =

Public university in Florence, Alabama, US

- Former names: LaGrange College (1830-1855); Florence Wesleyan College (1855-1872); State Normal School of Florence (1872–1929); Florence State Teacher's College (1929–1957); Florence State College (1957–1967); Florence State University (1967–1974)
- Motto: Veritas Lux Orbis Terrarum (Latin)
- Motto in English: Truth is the Light of the World
- Type: Public university
- Established: 1830; 196 years ago
- Academic affiliations: Space-grant
- Endowment: $54.4 million (FY2024)
- President: Kenneth D. Kitts
- Faculty: 365
- Students: 10,204
- Undergraduates: 7,662
- Postgraduates: 2,542
- Location: Florence, Alabama, U.S. 34.81°N 87.68°W
- Campus: Urban, 130 acres (53 ha)
- Colors: UNA Purple, UNA Gold & White
- Nickname: Lions
- Sporting affiliations: NCAA Division I – ASUN; UAC
- Mascots: Leo & Una
- Website: www.una.edu

The University of North Alabama (UNA) is a public university in Florence, Alabama, United States. It is the state's oldest university. Occupying a 130-acre (0.5 km^{2}) campus in a residential section of Florence, UNA is located within a four-city area that also includes Tuscumbia, Sheffield and Muscle Shoals. The four cities compose a metropolitan area with a combined population of 140,000 people.

The University of North Alabama was one of about 180 "normal schools" founded by state governments in the 19th century to train teachers for the rapidly growing public common schools. Some closed but most steadily expanded their role and became state colleges in the early 20th century and state universities in the late 20th century. It was founded as LaGrange College in 1830. It was reestablished in 1872 as the first state-supported teachers college south of the Ohio River. A year later, it became one of the nation's first coeducational colleges.

== History ==
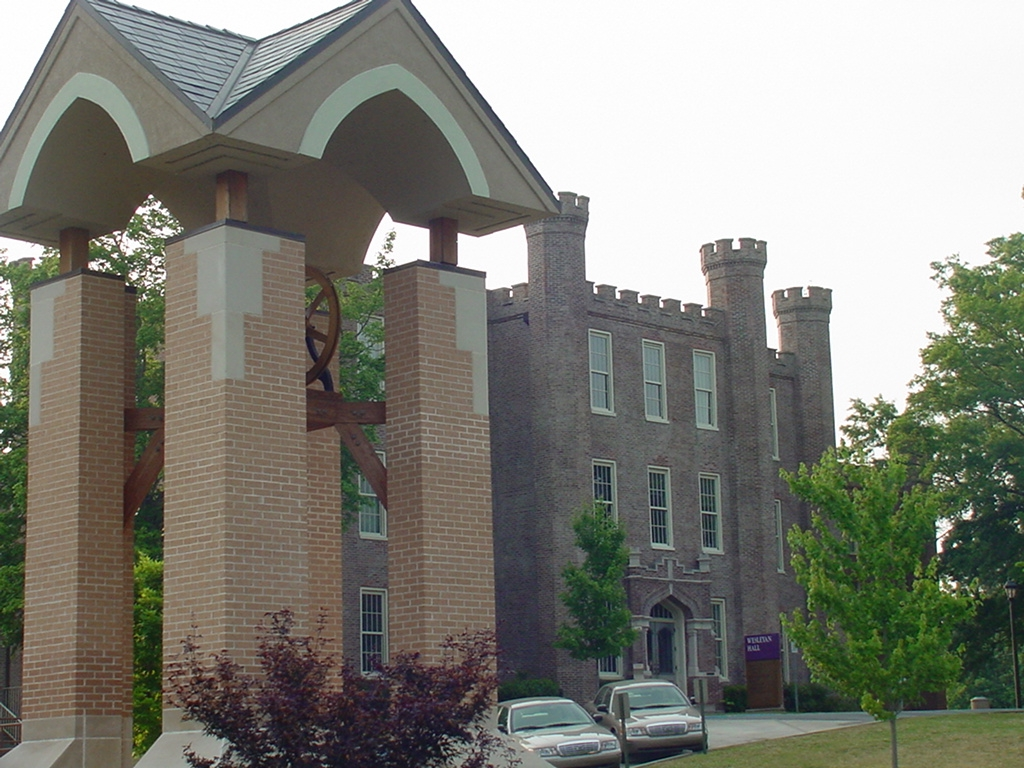
Historic Wesleyan Hall, one of the most familiar sites in Northwest Alabama, was used by both Union and Confederate armies during the U.S. Civil War. The 130-year-old Wesleyan Bell (foreground) tolled frequently throughout the late 19th century, summoning Florence Normal School students to class.

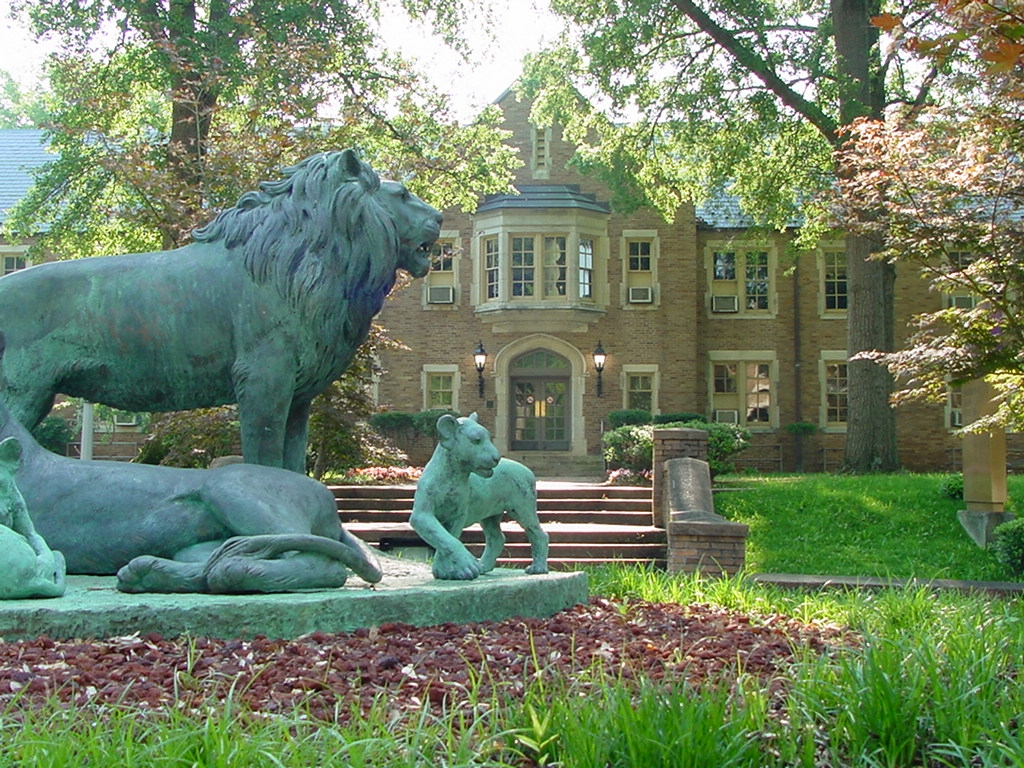
Willingham Hall is one of several buildings on campus built by the Works Projects Administration in the 1930s.

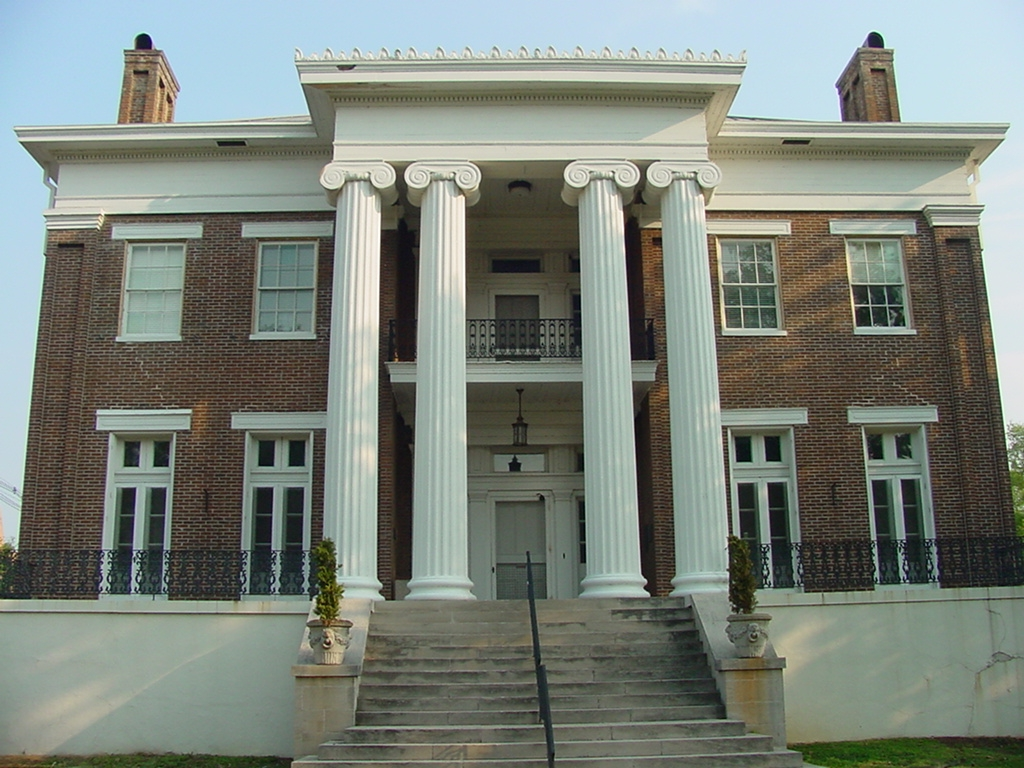
Rogers Hall, another distinctive UNA landmark, functioned as a Confederate command post during the U.S. Civil War.

UNA's earliest predecessor was LaGrange College, which arose from the idea offered at an 1826 meeting of the Tennessee Conference of the Methodist Episcopal Church to establish a college which would not be "religious or theological". By January 1829, the selection of Lawrence Hill on LaGrange Mountain, about 15 miles south of Florence, was made for the site of the school, and the college opened on January 11, 1830, to students of all denominations in two three-story brick buildings.

LaGrange graduate Richard H. Rivers, after becoming president of the college, led most of the students and all but one faculty member from the mountain in late 1854 to relocate to Florence and re-incorporate it as Florence Wesleyan University, with 160 students enrolled in its first year of operation. In 1858, the remnant of the original LaGrange College was re-established as LaGrange College and Military Academy, which continued to operate until 1863, when the buildings were destroyed by Union soldiers of the 10th Missouri Cavalry. However, Florence Wesleyan was saved from destruction during the Civil War.

When the Methodist Church deeded Florence Wesleyan to the State of Alabama in 1872, the institution became the State Normal School at Florence, the first state-supported teachers college south of the Ohio River. Shortly thereafter, it became one of the first co-educational institutions in the nation; in 1874, 31 young women enrolled. In 1929, it became a state teachers college offering a four-year curriculum in elementary education. In 1947, the curriculum was expanded again to include A.B. and B.S. degree programs in fields other than teacher training. In 1956, the institution formed a graduate course of study, and the following year, the Alabama Legislature voted to change the institution's name to Florence State College. In 1963, Wendell Wilkie Gunn became the first African-American student to enroll at the college, after a hearing that lasted only ten minutes.

In 1967 the Alabama Legislature removed jurisdiction for the college from the State Board of Education and vested it in a board of trustees. A year later, the new board voted for another name change to Florence State University, accompanied by the establishment of separate schools within the university. Less than a decade later, on August 15, 1974, the university underwent another change of name to the University of North Alabama, symbolizing its coming of age as a comprehensive, regional university.

Following a reorganization in 1991, the university's administrative structure consists of four divisions. In 1993, the Board of Trustees, anticipating continued and steady enrollment growth, adopted a new master facilities plan to ensure that UNA will be equipped to accommodate 10,000 students. Kenneth D. Kitts became the 20th president of the University of North Alabama in March 2015.

== Campus ==
UNA's campus facilities master plan was developed by the Olmsted Brothers, the sons of the architect who designed New York City's Central Park. The campus has three antebellum structures: Wesleyan Hall; Rogers Hall; and Coby Hall. All three are listed in the National Historic Register. The University of North Alabama encompasses two campuses, following a decision in June 2006, by the university's board of trustees to purchase J.W. Powell School from the Florence City Schools. The East Campus houses several academic units, including the Office of Continuing Studies and Outreach and the Human Environmental Sciences' state-of-the-art Culinary Facility

=== Buildings ===
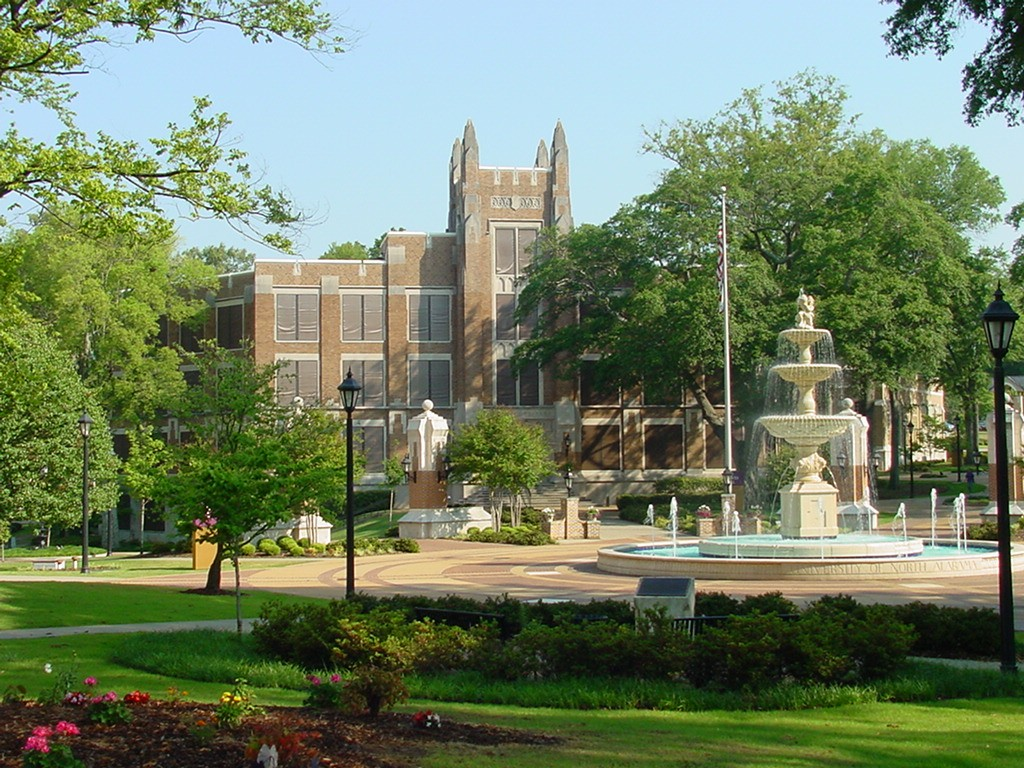
Harrison Plaza, official entrance to the University of North Alabama. In the background is 601 Cramer Way, the university's main administrative building.

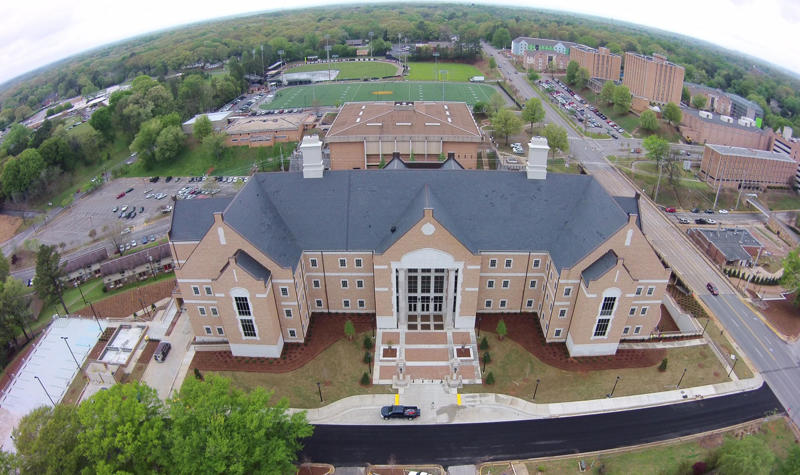
The Mitchell Burford Science and Technology Building at UNA

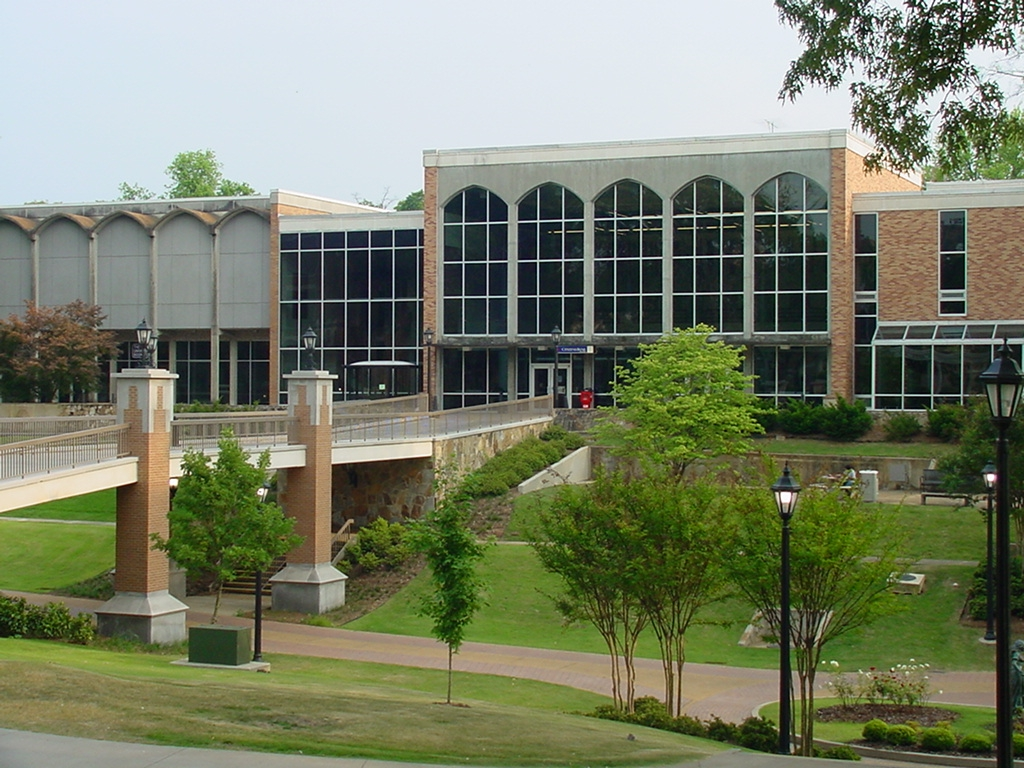
Named after one of UNA's presidents, the sprawling Guillot University Center constitutes the hub of UNA student life.

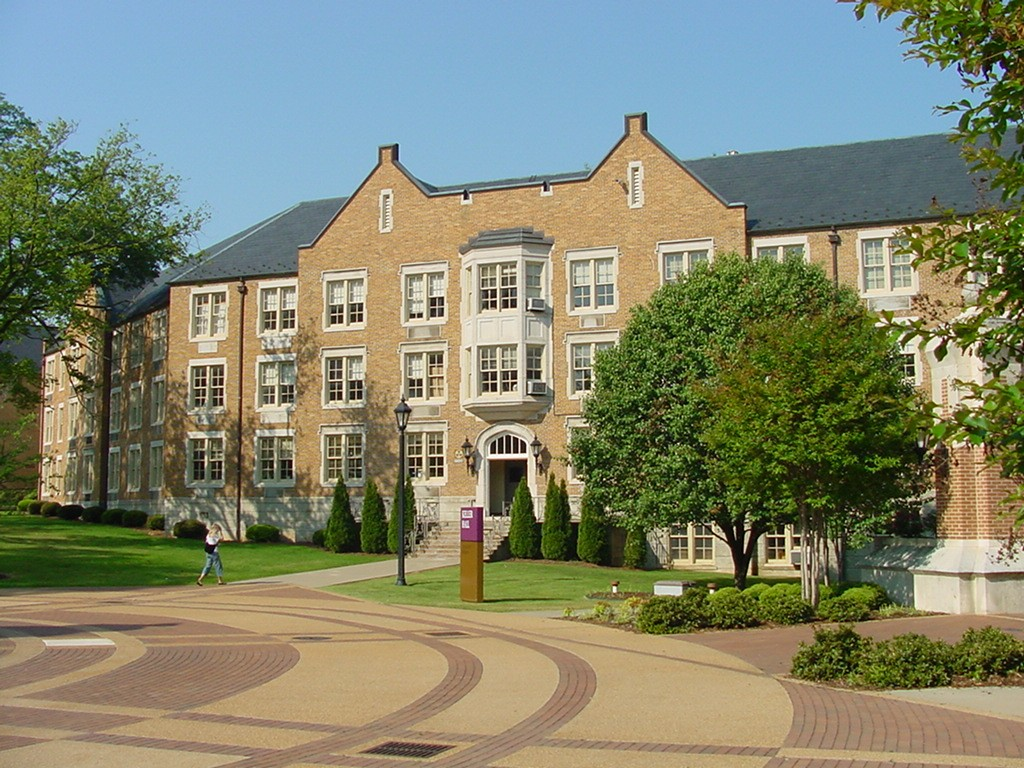
Keller Hall, constructed in 1947, serves as headquarters for the university's College of Business & Technology.

The UNA Science and Engineering Technology Building was completed in 2015. The five-story, 160,000-square-foot facility was designed by Lambert Ezell Durham Architects and constructed by BL Harbert, The building houses engineering technology, biology, chemistry, occupational health science, physics and earth science. It also includes conference areas, faculty offices, research facilities, specialized classrooms, a dining area, computer laboratories, super laboratories and lecture halls. In June 2018, the building was renamed the Mitchell Burford Science and Technology Building in honor of Mitchell Burford, the largest individual private donor in the university's history.

The Wendell W. Gunn University Commons was completed in 2014. The $8 million complex houses the University Success Center, Student Financial Services, the UNA branch of Listerhill Credit Union, Starbucks and Chick-fil-A. The commons was designed by Hugo Dante and Create Architects, and was built by Consolidated Construction. In March 2018, the building was renamed the Wendell W. Gunn University Commons in honor of Wendell Gunn, the first African-American student to enter Florence State College in 1963.

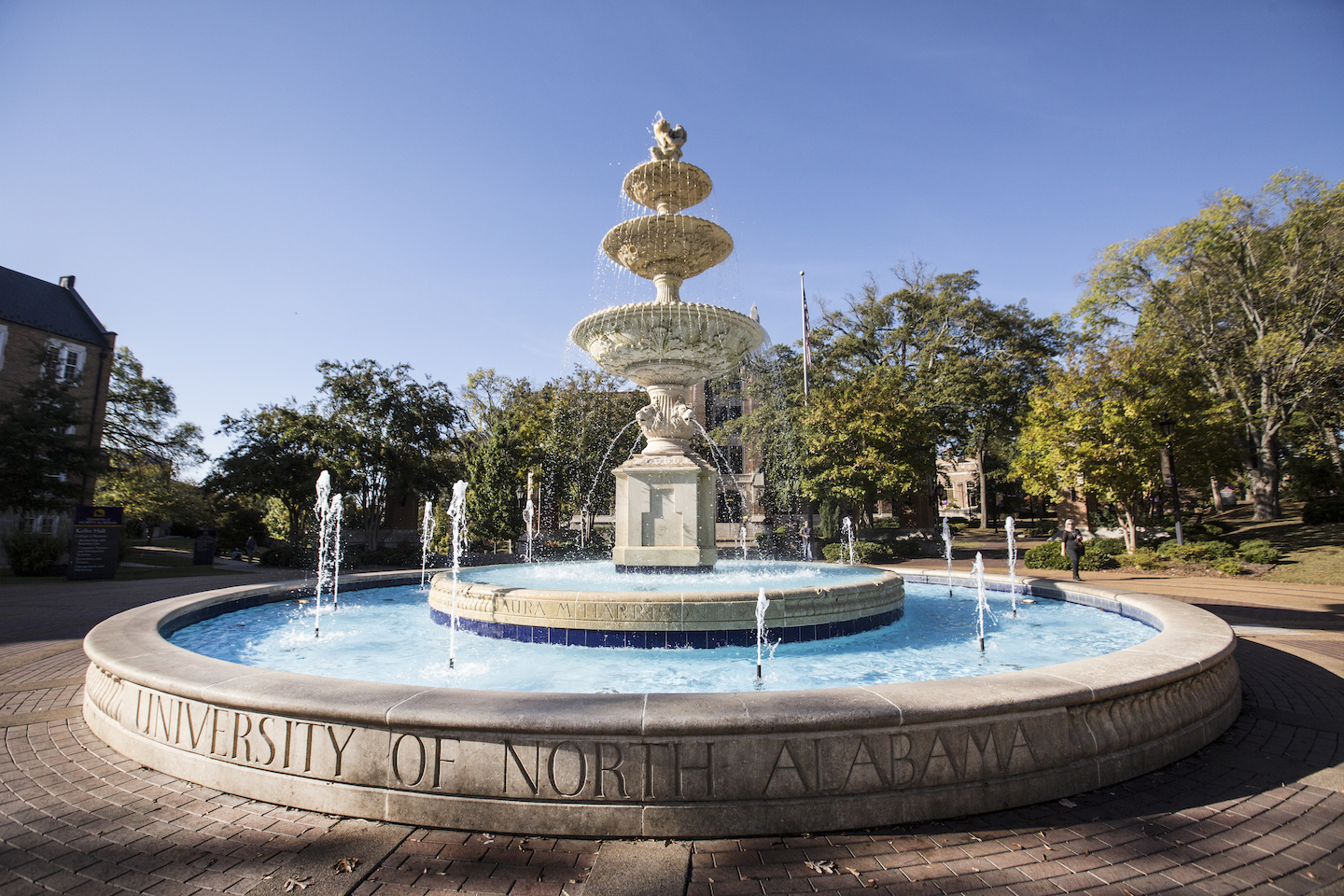
Laura Harrison Plaza. The 28-foot (9 m) high Italian limestone fountain bears design elements patterned after the limestone art deco accents on 601 Cramer Way.

Harrison Plaza was made possible by 1955 alumna Laura McAnally Harrison and her husband, Donald C. Harrison, of Cincinnati. The plaza, constructed around a large Italian limestone fountain, occupies the former intersections of Morrison and Wesleyan Avenues and Seminary Street between 601 Cramer Way, Keller Hall and the George H. Carroll Lion Habitat, which houses UNA's live mascots. Harrison Plaza now constitutes the hub of UNA's three pedestrian walkways and serves as the principal entrance to campus.

With its distinctive towers, Wesleyan Hall, one of UNA's most familiar structures, is considered one of the most eminent landmarks in North Alabama. The Gothic Revival structure was designed to serve LaGrange College when this Methodist institution relocated from Franklin to Lauderdale county and was renamed Florence Wesleyan University. During the Civil War, Wesleyan Hall was occupied by both Union and Confederate armies. General William Tecumseh Sherman is considered the most famous Civil War-era occupant of Wesleyan Hall. After the war, the building was deeded to the state of Alabama and thereafter served as a state normal school. It currently serves as the center for Foreign Languages (French, German, and Spanish), Psychology, and Geography. The building is listed in the National Register of Historic Places. Adjacent to Wesleyan Hall in a specially constructed tower is the Wesleyan Bell, which tolled regularly throughout the last quarter of the 19th century to summon Florence Normal School students to class. Sometime around 1910, the bell was removed from Wesleyan Hall and stored. Rediscovered in 2002, the 130-year-old Wesleyan Bell was restored to a prominent place on campus following construction of the Smith Bell Tower in 2004.

Rogers Hall, another one of UNA's most distinctive structures, was constructed by planter George Washington Foster in 1855 at the summit of Court Street (hence its original name, Courtview). Because construction would result in the permanent obstruction of a major thoroughfare, the city had to secure the approval of the Alabama Legislature before work could begin. In the fall of 1864, the residence served as the headquarters of Confederate Gen. Nathan Bedford Forrest. Courtview was occupied by members of the Foster family until 1900, when it became the home of Alabama Governor Emmet O'Neal. In the 1920s, the residence was acquired by Thomas M. Rogers Sr., and in 1948 by the university. It houses the Offices of Advancement, Alumni Relations, and Communications and Marketing.

Constructed in 1930, 601 Cramer Way houses UNA's senior administrative offices. The building is named for David Bibb Graves, who served as Alabama's governor from 1927 to 1931 and 1935–39. Graves's passage of the largest education budget in Alabama history led to the moniker as the "Education Governor", Graves's support for education led to recognition on virtually every Alabama college campus. The Office of the President, Executive Vice President for Academic Affairs and Provost, Vice President for Business and Financial Affairs, Human Resources, and the College of Arts, Sciences, and Engineering are housed in the building.

Coby Hall was donated to the university in 1990 by David Brubaker in memory of his wife, Coby Stockard Brubaker. Built by John Simpson on the site of his earlier home in 1843, the Simpson House/Irvine Place, as it had been known, later was purchased by George W. Foster, builder of Courtview, for his daughter, Virginia, and her husband, James B. Irvine. The University Admissions office is located in the building. Coby Hall is listed in the National Register of Historic Places.

The Robert M. Guillot University Center is named after UNA's former president, who served from 1972 to 1989. Popularly known as the "GUC," it houses the Post Office, 256 Grill, Moe's Southwest Grill, Panda Express and the Lion's Den Game Room. The GUC also houses the Student Engagement Office, the Vice President for Student Affairs Office, Student Conduct, Title IX, University Case Manager, Career Planning, the University Center Operations and Event Management Office, Disability Student Services, UNA Dining, Military and Veterans Services, University Ombudsman, Division of Diversity, Equity, and Inclusion, PMA Program and the Student Government Association. The Performance Center, located on the second floor, hosts a variety of events including concerts and comedy acts.

The Memorial Amphitheater, erected in 1934 as a memorial to World War I veterans, is used for outdoor plays, concerts and speeches. Much like the nearby Guillot Center, it is a popular site for socializing, lounging and studying between classes.

Originally a men's dormitory, Keller Hall, constructed in 1947, is named after James Albert Keller, who served as president of Florence State Teachers College from 1938 to 1948. Keller Hall serves as the headquarters of UNA's College of Business & Technology, housing the dean, faculty offices, computer labs and classrooms, as well as the Steele Center for Professional Selling. Keller Hall underwent a significant expansion following dedication of the Raburn Wing in 2002. This new addition provides state-of-the-art classrooms and related space for the College of Business & Technology.

Originally a women's dormitory, Willingham Hall, named after long-serving President Henry J. Willingham, was constructed by the Works Projects Administration in 1939. Willingham Hall houses the Department of English, the Department of History, and the Department of Politics, Justice, Law, and Philosophy.

The President's Home, completed in 1941, was constructed by the Works Projects Administration. Occupied by President and Mrs. Kenneth Kitts, the residence is located next to the George H. Carroll Lion Habitat, home of Leo III and Una, the university's live lion mascots. Overnight guests often were awakened by the lions' roaring.

=== Residences ===
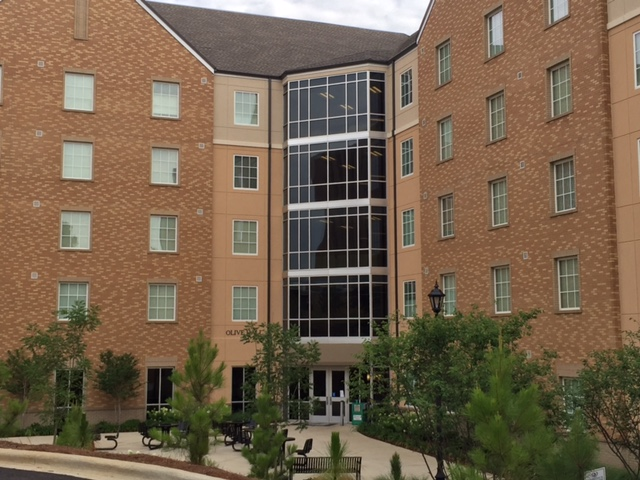
Olive Residence Hall

Mattielou and Olive residence halls were completed in fall 2015 and spring 2016, respectively. The new residence halls are located on the extreme north end of campus, behind Covington and Hawthorne halls. Mattielou has 335 spaces and Olive has 429 spaces. These buildings were built primarily for incoming freshmen students. There are double and limited single rooms and each unit has its own bathroom.

== Academic organization ==
=== Classification and accreditation ===
According to the Carnegie Classifications of Institutions of Higher Education, the University of North Alabama is considered an M1; Master's Colleges and Universities: Larger Programs. UNA is a mid-sized, four year institution accredited by the Southern Association of Colleges and Schools Commission on Colleges.

=== Degrees conferred ===
The University of North Alabama's five colleges offer degree programs in more than 80 different areas of study. UNA conferred 1,304 undergraduate degrees and 643 graduate degrees in the 2020–2021 academic year.

Cum laude honors are conferred to graduates with a GPA of 3.5–3.69. Magna cum laude honors are conferred with a GPA of 3.70–3.89. Summa cum laude honors are conferred with a GPA of 3.9 or higher.

=== Programs ===
The University of North Alabama offers 219 bachelor's degree programs and concentrations, 45 master's degree programs, 3 education specialist degree programs, 3 doctoral programs, and numerous certificates and micro-credentials. UNA is composed of five colleges:

Colleges:

- Anderson College of Nursing and Health Professions
- College of Arts, Sciences, and Engineering
- Sanders College of Business and Technology
- College of Education and Human Sciences
- Delores and Weldon Cole Honors College

=== Kilby School ===
The College of Education and Human Sciences oversees the Kilby Laboratory School (child development center, kindergarten through sixth grade). The vision of Kilby Laboratory School is to serve as a site for university students to engage in meaningful interdisciplinary teaching, research, and service opportunities.

=== Libraries ===
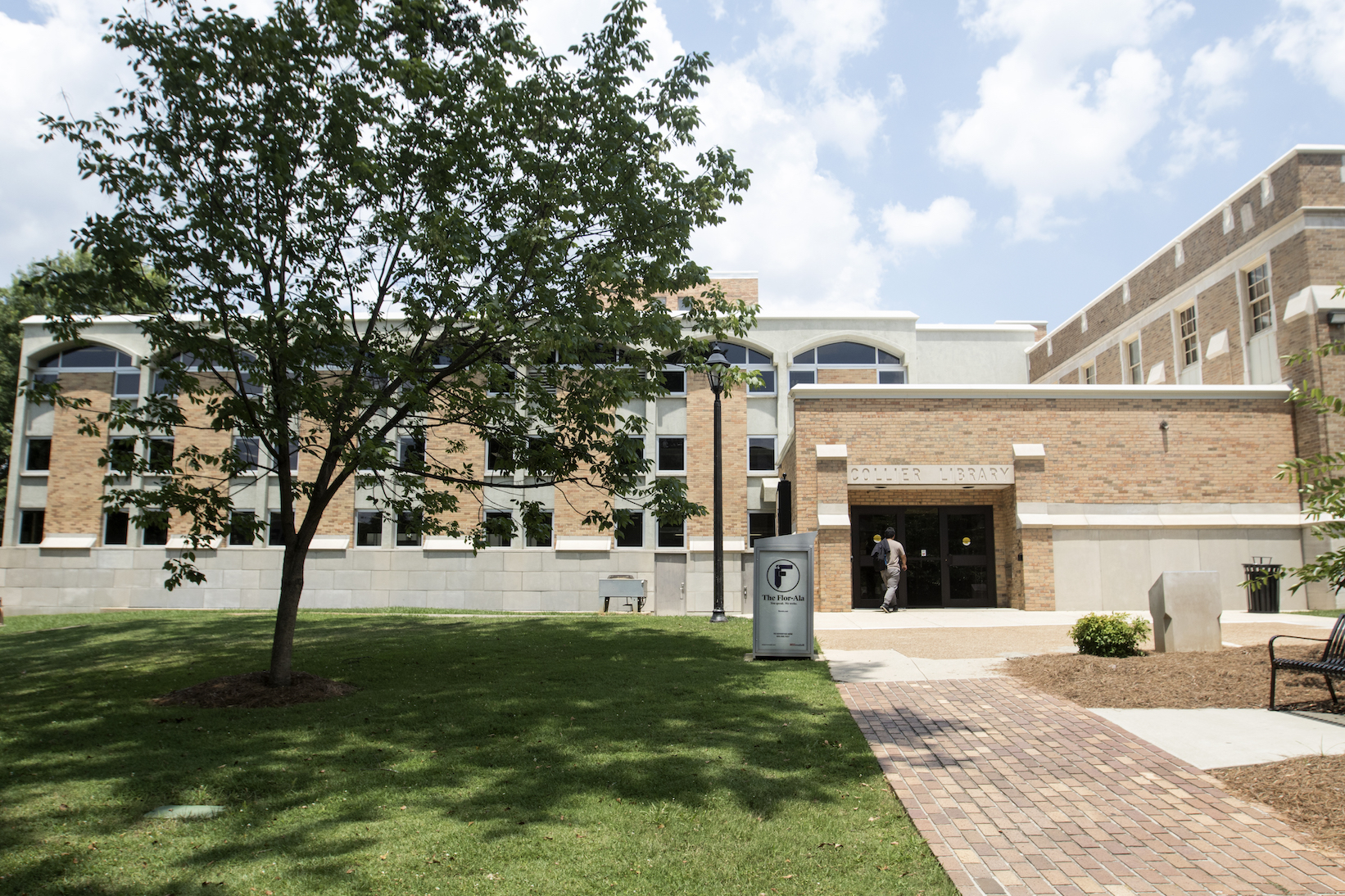
Collier Library

The university libraries include Collier Library (main library), the Learning Resources Center located in Stevens Hall, the Music Library located in the Music Building and the Kilby School Library. The combined holdings of the libraries provide users with access to literature from a wide range of disciplines and include newer formats such as streaming media. Materials not found in the libraries are available through interlibrary loan. Library instruction sessions tailored to meet the needs of individual classes may be scheduled through the library. Common topics include location books and articles, searching the Internet, and evaluation information sources.

Collier Library is named in memory of C.B. Collier, Dean of Florence State Teacher's College from 1918 to 1946. Notable items in the 350,000-volume library include the collections of several musicians, actors, and writers, including W.C. Handy, acclaimed the world over as "father of the blues." The Pulitzer Prize Certificate and Collection of T.S. Stribling, one of the South's premiere novelists and an alumnus of Florence Normal School, is housed in the library.

Script collections include those of science fiction author Ray Bradbury and actors Lucas Black, Ernest Borgnine, Tom Cherones, Elinor Donahue and Noble Willingham. Also included are the memorabilia of science fiction writer Forrest Ackerman.

Collier Library is the location of the George Lindsey Television and Film Collection, part of which is displayed in Norton Auditorium. In 2018 the library launched the UNA Scholarly Repository, a digital repository of the research and scholarly output of UNA faculty and students.

=== International emphasis ===
According to the tenth edition of American Universities and Colleges, published in 1968 by the American Council on Education, the University of North Alabama, then known as Florence State College, had only three international students enrolled during the 1966–1967 academic year—two undergraduate students and one graduate student, all from the Middle East. However, during the Robert Potts administration, UNA undertook a concerted effort to diversify its student body by recruiting individuals from throughout the world. By 2004, international enrollment had grown to nearly 300 students representing 35 countries.

Today, UNA has the third highest international student enrollment of any institution in its category according to U.S. News & World Report's America's Best Colleges. Roughly 4 percent of the UNA student body is international. The Global Lions Organization has become one of the largest and most influential student organizations on campus. A major focus of the GLO is organizing campus and community activities to integrate international students more closely with other UNA students and also with the surrounding Shoals community.

== Student body ==
Undergraduate demographics as of fall 2023
Race and ethnicity	Total
White	72%
Black	9%
International student	6%
Hispanic	5%
Two or more races	4%
Asian	2%
Economic diversity
Low-income (Note: The percentage of students who received an income-based federal Pell grant intended for low-income students.)	34%
Affluent (Note: The percentage of students who are a part of the American middle class at the bare minimum.)	66%

Fall 2021 gender/ethnic breakdown of students for the University of North Alabama
	Am. Ind./Alaskan Nat.	Asian	Black/African Am.	Hispanic	Multi	Hawaiian/other	Non-res. alien	Not reported	White	Total
Undergraduate female	22	127	384	158	164	4	108	86	2,907	3,960
Undergraduate male	14	107	264	99	74	-	150	88	1,546	2,342
Undergraduate total	36	234	648	257	238	4	258	174	4,453	6,302
Graduate female	8	59	267	58	46	1	57	24	1,117	1,637
Graduate male	3	82	115	31	18	-	40	14	590	893
Graduate total	11	141	382	89	64	1	97	38	1,707	2,530
Total female	30	186	651	216	210	5	165	110	4,024	5,597
Total male	17	189	379	130	92	-	190	102	2,136	3,235
Total headcount	47	375	1,030	346	302	5	355	212	6,160	8,832
% of total	0.5%	4.2%	11.7%	3.9%	3.4%	0.1%	4.0%	2.4%	69.7%	100%

Full-time, four-year undergraduates comprise most of the total university enrollment. In fall 2021, 72% of all students were considered full-time and 28% were considered part-time. Total enrollment for the fall 2021 semester was 8,832. Total enrollment for the fall 2020 semester was 8,361. In regards to source of student, 70.5% of students came from within the state of Alabama, 21.0% were from out-of-state areas, and 8.5% were considered international students in the fall of 2021.

== Media ==
- The Diorama is UNA's student-run yearbook.
- The Flor-Ala, named after Florence, Alabama, has functioned as the school newspaper since 1931. Published in 29 issues each year, the paper is run by UNA students who serve in all facets of news gathering, writing and production. The Flor-Ala is a member of the Associated Collegiate Press.
- Lights & Shadows, published once a year, is the university's literary and art magazine, and was started as a publication of the Florence State Teachers College English Club in 1956.
- UNA Magazine, UNA's alumni magazine, is published bi-annually.

== Athletics ==
UNA operated a collegiate athletic program in NCAA Division II's Gulf South Conference for almost fifty years as a founding member of the conference. The North Alabama Lions football, men's basketball, women's volleyball, and softball teams have each won national championships.

UNA operates 14 varsity teams, which have collected more than 40 conference championships, dozens of No. 1 national rankings and seven national titles. It also possesses the oldest costume mascot program in the state of Alabama.

As of July 1, 2018, UNA began its transition to Division I as a member of the ASUN Conference in 2018. Because the ASUN did not sponsor football at the time, the football team became an independent in the second level of D-I football, the Football Championship Subdivision, at the same time. The following year, UNA became a football-only member of the FCS Big South Conference. The Lions remained in Big South football through the 2020–21 season, after which the ASUN entered into a football-only alliance with the Western Athletic Conference, which reinstated football at the FCS level in fall 2021. The Lions now play football in the successor to the ASUN–WAC alliance, the football-only United Athletic Conference.

== Greek life ==
O'Neal Hall, circa 1978. A former dormitory, the "Brick House," as O'Neal was commonly known, housed the embryonic Greek community at UNA. The Greek letters are clearly visible under the windows. In time, most of the fraternities secured off-campus lodges. Sororities remained until the building was demolished in the 1980s to make space for Guillot University Center.

The university's embryonic Greek community initially was housed in O'Neal Hall, which was demolished in the 1980s to clear space for the construction of the Guillot University Center. Fraternities and sororities combined represent slightly less than 10 percent of the undergraduate student population. Despite these comparatively small numbers, Greeks historically have exerted a major influence on virtually every facet of student life at UNA.

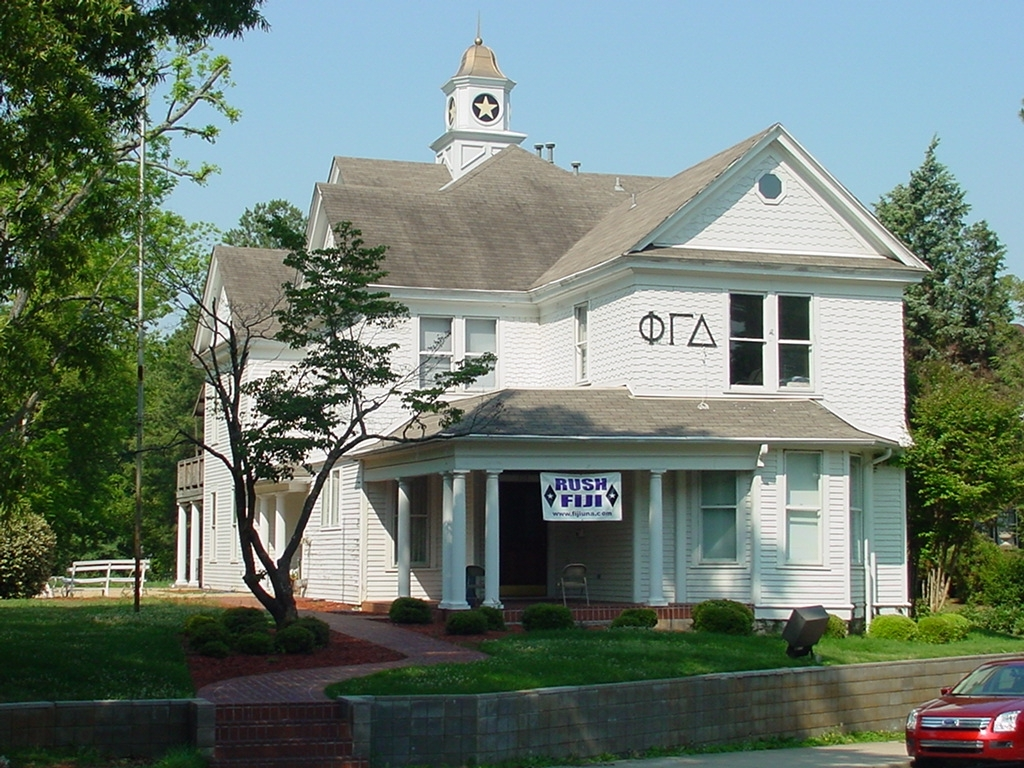
A typical fraternity house on campus

== Student life ==
=== School colors ===
Purple and gold are the school colors of the University of North Alabama. While they are a ubiquitous sight on campus and especially at UNA athletic events, no one has ever ascertained who or what inspired their adoption. Little in the school archives accounts for the origin of these colors, according to Cecil Nabors, a UNA archivist and associate professor. All that is certain is that the 1912 yearbook, published the same year as inauguration of the football team, was named the "Purple and Gold."

=== UNA Fight Song ===
The "UNA Fight Song" is the fight song of the University of North Alabama, and is played by the Marching Pride of North Alabama. The song is based on one of three songs called "Three School Songs," which was published in the 1960s. The lyrics were chosen by band members in the late 1970s.

=== "Lion Pride" and "Pride Rock" ===
"Lion Pride" is a term frequently used by members of the UNA community to describe commitment to school traditions and activities reflected among students, alumni and friends of the university.

The university's Pride Rock tradition began in 1994. Pride Rock is a 69-pound, engraved granite stone bearing the actual paw print of Leo II, UNA's second live lion mascot. Placed just behind the north end zone of all UNA home games, Pride Rock is touched by players as they file past on their way to the field. Pride Rock serves not only as a motivational tool for the players but also as a tangible expression of the deep well of pride, community and tradition associated with the University of North Alabama and particularly with its athletic program.

=== Mascots ===
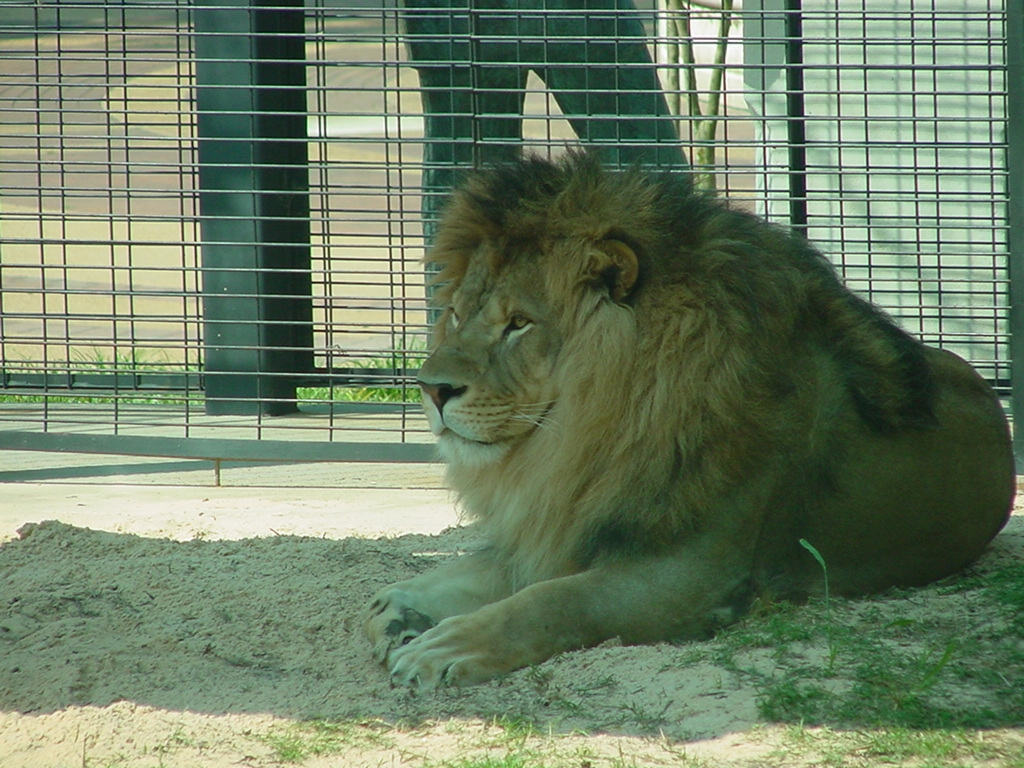
Leo III during a mid-morning outing at the George H. Carroll Lion Habitat

On July 22, 1974, former UNA president Robert M. Guillot brought a lion cub to the campus and Leo I spent the next 14 years "roaring" the school to victory. The original Leo died on January 20, 1988, and a great outpouring of support from the Shoals community resulted in Leo II being brought to UNA in July 1988. Leo II lived in the compound that once housed the original Leo. In 1997, Leo II was selected as the nation's "Second Best Mascot" by Sports Illustrated. He died in February 2000. Leo III was born on November 18, 2002, and resided on the campus in the 12,764-square-foot (1,186 m^{2}) George H. Carroll Lion Habitat. Leo III had lived on campus with his sister, Una, who died on June 30, 2020. He died in 2024.

==== Traditional mascots ====
Leo and Una, the mascots of the University of North Alabama, are two anthropomorphic lion siblings. Leo's name is taken from the Latin word for lion, and Una is named after the common abbreviation of the university's name. Leo is described as a comedic character, while Una's personality leans more towards being cute. The earliest usage of UNA's character mascot (also called "Leo") is in an article from the January 1949 edition of the Flor-Ala, describing him as a "cartoon" to be used in that year's issue of the Diorama.

The exact date of the debut of Leo as a costume mascot is unknown, but the earliest recorded mention is from another article in the Flor-Ala on November 6, 1961, portrayed at the time by Claude Hunt, who initiated efforts to begin a mascot program at the university. The original suit was made of a head created by the Art Department of the University, and a body made by Hunt's mother. Prior to the advent of Una in 2008, Leo's original female counterpart was a lioness with a much simpler design, called Leona. Around 1975, the year following the acquisition of the university's first live lion, the mascot program was done away with. Just as efforts by a student began the program, though, a push by a student named Ramona Sutton would revive Leo, but not Leona, in 1979. As the original costume was no longer in usable condition, a new one would be created. A more realistic design would be used from 1985 to 1995. Two new costumes were produced in 2009 based on a design by a staff member named Walt Vandiver, including the first costume for Una. After one more change in design, the university would mark 75 years since the creation of the mascot on January 19, 2024.

=== Miss UNA Scholarship Pageant ===
The Miss UNA Scholarship Pageant is an official preliminary for the Miss Alabama/Miss America Pageant. The Miss UNA Scholarship pageant has been a UNA tradition for over 31 years. The pageant provides an opportunity for the university's young women to compete in the following categories for scholarship money and prizes. In 2007 over $12,000 in scholarships and prizes was awarded to the contestants. Each young woman is encouraged and mentored to develop skills that will enrich her personal and professional life beyond her university experience. Miss University of North Alabama spends her year in service to the university and Shoals Area community. She promotes the platform of her choice, makes official appearances as a university representative, and represents the university at the Miss Alabama Scholarship Pageant.

=== Spirit Hill tailgating and Lion Walk ===
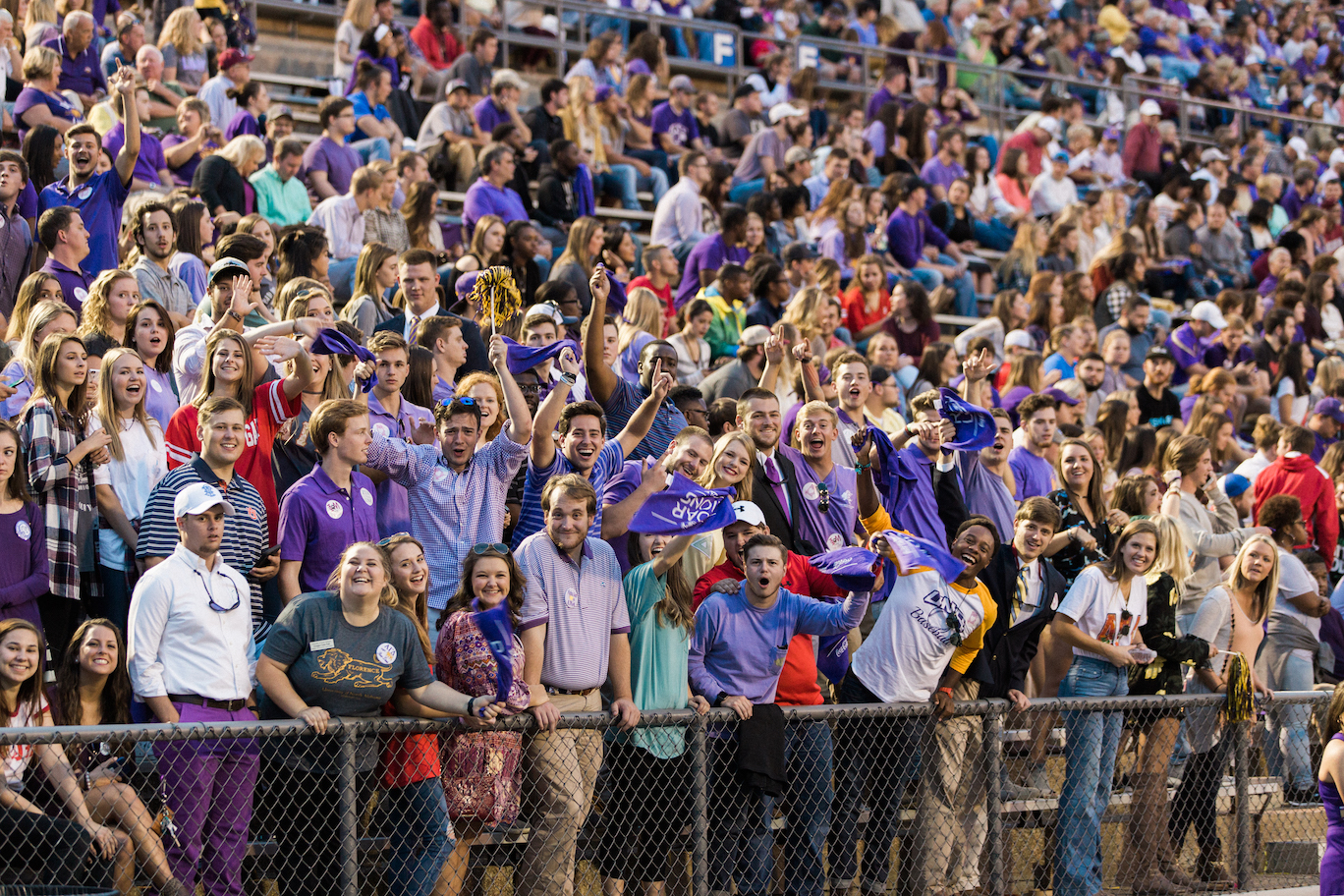
Fans cheering at Braly Municipal Stadium

Within the past few years, pregame tailgating at Spirit Hill, an area adjoining Braly Municipal Stadium, has developed into a major UNA tradition, thanks largely to the efforts of former Athletic Director Joel Erdmann. Erdmann enlisted the UNA Greek community, general student organizations and alumni to expand this tradition, which had been lacking.

Along with former head UNA football Coach Mark Hudspeth, Erdmann also was instrumental in developing the highly popular Lion Walk, a pregame parade down Royal Avenue (next to Spirit Hill) that includes Lion athletes, cheerleaders and the Marching Pride of North Alabama. The parade is held before every UNA home game.

=== UNA's Marching Pride of North Alabama ===
The Marching Pride of North Alabama was founded in 1949. The Marching Band has represented the university at many different events since, including a performance for President Jimmy Carter during his historic 1980 visit to neighboring Tuscumbia.

The band also appeared in the award-winning movie, Blue Sky, starring Jessica Lange, Tommy Lee Jones and Powers Boothe. The Marching Band recorded a CD with famed musician and producer Jimmy Johnson.

With more than 210 members, the group is the largest organization on campus and serves as a major contributor to school spirit, especially at athletic events. The UNA Marching Band performs at all home football games, local parades and travels the state performing in exhibition at high school competitions. They are known for precision marching and drill design, while entertaining with strongly played jazz standards.

=== Step Sing ===
In the spring, Step Sing is a well-attended event in Norton Auditorium sponsored by the University Program Council featuring take-offs of musical comedy production numbers by campus organizations. Money raised from ticket sales supports the local United Way.

== Notable people ==
Alumni and other former students of the University of North Alabama include business leaders; a number of governors, congressmen and other government and military leaders; professional athletes; and artists and entertainers.
