= George H. Carroll Lion Habitat =

Lion enclosure in North Alabama, US

Coordinates: 34°48′26″N 87°40′48″W

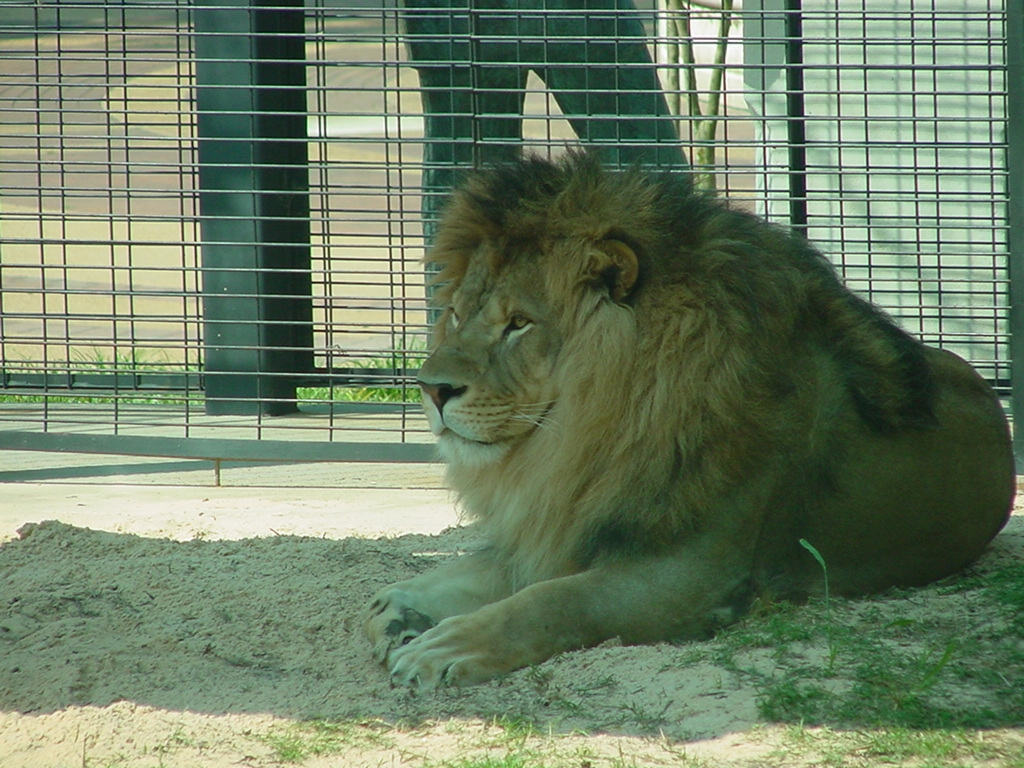
- Interactive map of George H. Carroll Lion Habitat
- Date opened: 2007
- Owner: University of North Alabama
- Website: Official website

The George H. Carroll Lion Habitat is a 12,764-square-foot (1,185.8 m^{2}), climate-controlled facility located on the campus the University of North Alabama, US that previously housed the only live lion mascots in the United States, Leo III and Una. It was dedicated on October 7, 2007, and is named after the late owner of the construction firm Pressure Concrete, which built the facility and donated labor, materials and funds. No federal or state dollars or tuition fees were used in construction of the habitat.

The habitat cost US$1.3 million. Feeding and caring for the lions costs $35,000 annually, all covered by charitable contributions.

Certified Alarm Company of Alabama provided a sophisticated alarm and surveillance system, which is monitored at all times.

The facility exceeds all the requirements of the U.S. Department of Agriculture and Association of Zoos and Aquariums (AZA), a professional accrediting agency. UNA's live lion mascot tradition began in 1973, when then-President Dr. Robert Guillot personally acquired a 12-pound lion cub, now known as Leo I, from a Knoxville, Tennessee, zoo. Since then, his birth date, April 14, has been celebrated as the official lion mascot birthday, an annual event that attracts kindergarten and elementary school children from throughout the Shoals region.

The former residential lions, Leo III and Una, were born November 18, 2002, at a USDA-sanctioned refuge owned by Glen and Kathy Eldridge in Greenville, New Hampshire. Una died in 2020, and Leo III in 2024.
