= Colby High School =

Colby High School may refer to:

- Colby High School (Kansas) in Colby, Kansas
- Colby High School (Wisconsin) in Colby, Wisconsin

== See also ==
- Colby (disambiguation)
