= Kopi =

Kopi may refer to:

- An alternative name for the karaka tree
- Kopi, a clay mourning cap worn by some Aboriginal Australian peoples
- Kopi (drink), a coffee beverage with Hainanese cultural roots popular in Maritime Southeast Asia
  - Kopitiam, a coffee shop or restaurant in Southeast Asia that serves kopi as a menu item
- Coffee in Indonesia
  - Kopi luwak, a specially processed coffee made in Indonesia and the Philippines today typically involves civet cats
  - Kopi tubruk, an Indonesian brewed coffee beverage served black

== See also ==
- Kobi (disambiguation)
- Köpi, König Pilsener beer
- Køpi, housing project in Berlin
