= Coby Hall =

Building in Alabama, United States

Coordinates: 34.8045°N 87.6794°W

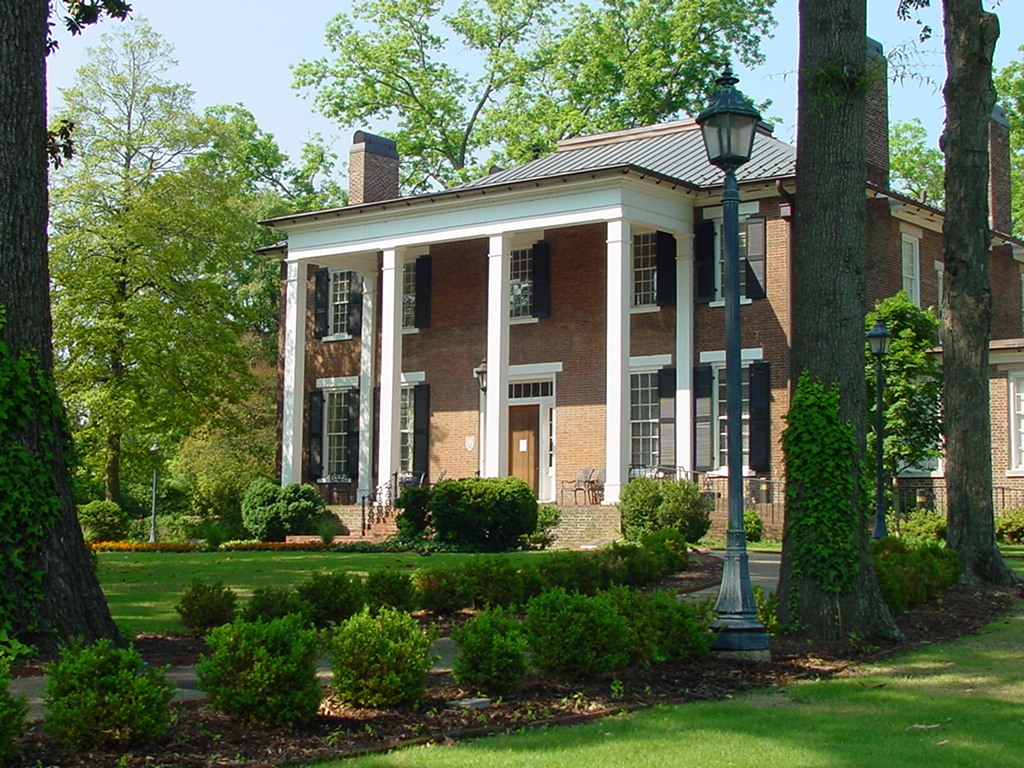
Coby Hall on the UNA campus.

Coby Hall is an antebellum Georgian Revival former residence in Florence, Alabama, that now serves as a learning and cultural center for the University of North Alabama.

== History ==
=== 19th century ===
The house was built by John Simpson on the site of his earlier home in 1843. Simpson was sent to Florence by James Jackson, builder of the Forks of Cypress, another prominent antebellum structure in the Shoals area, to buy land and to operate a mercantile business.

The Simpson House—Irvine Place, as originally named, was later purchased by George W. Foster for his daughter, Virginia, and her husband, James Bennington Irvine. Foster was the builder of Courtview, the present day UNA Rogers Hall.

=== 20th century ===
The residence later was inherited by the Irvine’s great granddaughter, Mrs. Madding King. Following World War II, the Kings restored the home, incorporating many architectural features still present today. In the early 1980s then-owner Ellis Coats allowed Project Courtview, the group responsible for the Rogers Hall restoration project, to use the mansion for Florence’s first Decorator’s Showcase, as part of the restoration’s fundraising effort.

=== 21st century ===
After serving briefly as a corporate headquarters, the mansion was purchased by David Brubaker, and given to the University of North Alabama in memory of his young wife, Coby Stockard Brubaker, who had died of cancer. The newly refurbished structure was dedicated as Coby Hall in 2005.

Coby Hall currently serves as the headquarters of UNA’s Admissions and Recruiting. The former residence also is the site for the annual Festival of Trees and is also a popular site for weddings, dinners, teas, receptions, and other campus-related social events.

== See also ==
- Antebellum architecture
