= Kobe (disambiguation) =

Kobe is a city in Japan and capital of the Hyōgo prefecture.

Kobe or KOBE may also refer to:

== People ==
- Kobe Bryant (1978–2020), American basketball player
- Kobe (artist) (1950–2014), Belgian visual artist and sculptor
- Kobe (esports commentator) (born 1986), American commentator for Riot Games
- Kobe Cools (born 1997), Belgian footballer
- Kobe (singer) (fl. from 2005), American singer and songwriter
- Kobe (given name), includes a list of people with the given name
- Kobe (surname), includes a list of people with the surname

== Other uses ==
- Kobé, a department of the Wadi Fira region in Chad
- Kobe beef, traditionally raised beef from the prefecture surrounding Kobe in Japan
- Okeechobee County Airport, Florida, U.S., ICAO airport code KOBE
- KOBE (AM), a radio station in New Mexico, U.S.

== See also ==
- Cobe (disambiguation)
- Coby (disambiguation)
- Kobi (disambiguation)
- Kobes, a surname
