= Benyamin Lichtenstein =

American Organizational Theorist

- Occupation: Professor
- Known for: Entreprenurship Program director, University of Massachusetts Boston

Benyamin Lichtenstein is professor of entrepreneurship and management at the University of Massachusetts Boston. where he directs the university's Entrepreneurship Program. His research applies complexity science to organizations, leadership, and entrepreneurship, particularly to the question of how new ventures and organizational structures emerge.

== Career ==
Lichtenstein taught entrepreneurship at the University of Hartford and at Syracuse University before joining the College of Management at the University of Massachusetts Boston. At UMass Boston, he is a full professor in the Management Department and director of the Entrepreneurship Program. He has served on the editorial boards of the Academy of Management Perspectives, Journal of Business Venturing, Entrepreneurship Theory and Practice, Group & Organization Management, and the International Journal of Complexity in Leadership and Management.

== Research ==
=== Emergence in new ventures ===
Much of Lichtenstein’s research concerns the creation of new ventures, which he studies as a process of emergence. This work includes papers with Kevin Dooley, Nancy Carter and William B. Gartner on nascent entrepreneurship, with Candida Brush on how the resources of new ventures change over time, and with G. T. Lumpkin on opportunity recognition.

In 2010, Lichtenstein and Jonathan Levie reviewed “stages of growth” models of firm development and proposed a “dynamic states” approach instead. In 2015, Lichtenstein co-authored a study arguing that many entrepreneurial outcomes follow power-law rather than normal distributions In Generative Emergence (2014), Lichtenstein proposed a five-phase model of how new organizations and social structures emerge.

=== Complexity and leadership ===
In 2006, Lichtenstein, Mary Uhl-Bien, Russ Marion and others published an article in Emergence: Complexity and Organization that treated leadership as an interactive process within complex adaptive systems, not as a trait of individual leaders. In 2009, Lichtenstein and Donde Ashmos Plowman proposed a model of how leadership actions can produce emergence at different levels of an organization.

Lichtenstein edited Complex Systems Leadership Theory (2007) with James K. Hazy and Jeffrey Goldstein, and the three wrote Complexity and the Nexus of Leadership (2010). The second book was reviewed in Complicity: An International Journal of Complexity and Education.

Organizational change

Lichtenstein’s early research was on transformative change in organizations. His 2000 article “Self-organized transitions: A pattern amid the chaos of transformative change” won the Academy of Management Executive Best Paper of the Year Award for 2001.

== Selected works ==
=== Books ===
- Hazy, James K.; Goldstein, Jeffrey; Lichtenstein, Benyamin B., eds. (2007). Complex Systems Leadership Theory: New Perspectives from Complexity Science on Social and Organizational Effectiveness. Boston: ISCE Press.
- Goldstein, Jeffrey; Hazy, James K.; Lichtenstein, Benyamin B. (2010). Complexity and the Nexus of Leadership: Leveraging Nonlinear Science to Create Ecologies of Innovation. Palgrave Macmillan. ISBN 978-0-230-62228-9.
- Lichtenstein, Benyamin B. (2014). Generative Emergence: A New Discipline of Organizational, Entrepreneurial, and Social Innovation. Oxford University Press. ISBN 978-0-19-993359-4.
