= Colby Mountain =

Summit in California, United States

- Location within California

Highest point
- Elevation: 9,640 ft (2,940 m)
- Prominence: 186 ft (57 m)
- Coordinates: 37°54′40.31″N 119°32′21.78″W

Geography
- Location: Yosemite National Park, Tuolumne County, California, United States
- Parent range: Sierra Nevada
- Topo map: USGS Ten Lakes

Colby Mountain is a summit in Tuolumne County, California. With an elevation of 9,639 feet (2,938 m), Colby Mountain is the 644th highest summit in the state of California.

Colby Mountain was named after William Edward Colby, first Secretary of the Sierra Club.
