= Kobi =

Kobi or KOBI may refer to:

- Kobi (given name), including a list of people with the name
- Kobi, a colour, a variation of red-violet
- Kobi, Georgia, a village
- Kobi Line, a railway in North Korea
- Kobi Station, a railway station in Minokamo, Gifu, Japan
- KOBI (TV), a TV station in Medford, Oregon, U.S.
- Kobi (comics), Indian comics
- Woodbine Municipal Airport (New Jersey), U.S., ICAO airport code KOBI

== See also ==
- Cobi (disambiguation)
- Kobe (disambiguation)
- Kopi (disambiguation)
- Gobi (disambiguation)
- Khobi, Georgian town
