= Goby, Virginia =

Unincorporated community in Virginia, United States

- Unincorporated community
- Location within Virginia and the United States Goby (the United States)
- Coordinates: 38°18′49″N 77°16′27″W
- Country: United States
- State: Virginia
- County: King George
- Time zone: UTC−5 (Eastern (EST))
  - Summer (DST): UTC−4 (EDT)

Goby is an unincorporated community in King George County, Virginia, United States.
