= Kolby =

Former parish in Denmark

Coordinates: 55°48′01″N 10°33′25″E

Kolby is a former parish of the Church of Denmark on Samsø island.

In 2004, it had 550 inhabitants, 492 of them being members of the church.

In 2014, all parishes on that island have been merged in one.

The parish
on Samsø island

Samsø between Jutland peninsula and the islands of Funen and Zealand

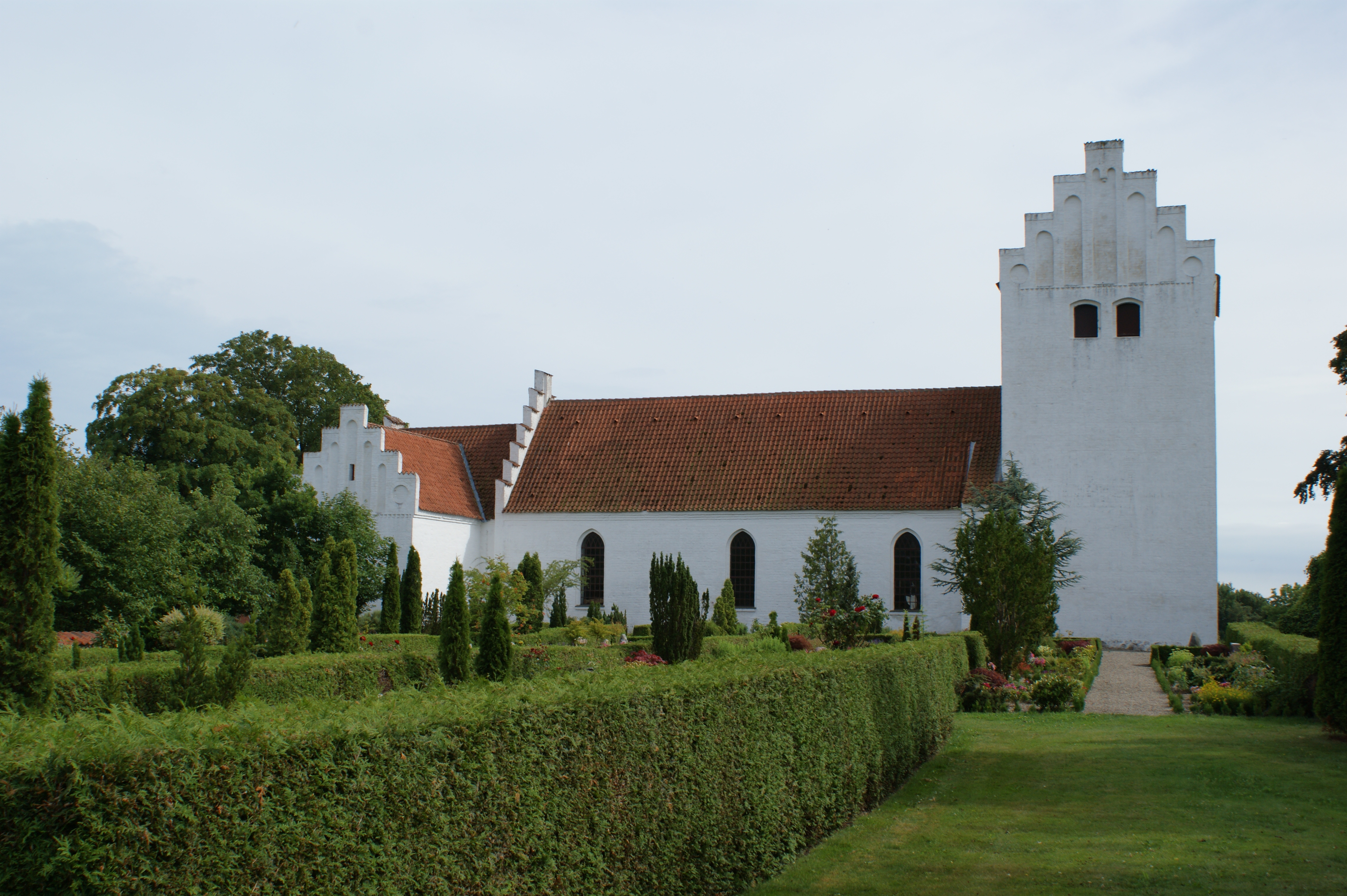
Kolby church
