= Cobi =

Cobi or COBI may refer to:

== People ==
- Cobi (musician) (Jacob Michael Schmidt, born 1986), an American musician
- Cobi Crispin (born 1988), an Australian wheelchair basketball player
- Cobi Hamilton (born 1990), an American football player
- Cobi Jones (born 1970), an American soccer player

== Other uses ==
- Cobi (mascot), the official mascot of the 1992 Summer Olympics in Barcelona
- Cobi (building blocks), a Polish toy company
- Communist Organisation in the British Isles, a former Marxist–Leninist political party in Britain and Ireland

== See also ==
- Cobe (disambiguation)
- Coby (disambiguation)
- Kobi (disambiguation)
