= Lichtenstein Cave =

Cave and archaeological site in Germany

- Lichtensteinhöhle
- location in Germany Lichtenstein Cave (Germany)
- 51°43′28″N 10°10′27″E
- Periods: Bronze Age
- Associated with: Homo sapiens
- Location: near Dorste
- Region: Lower Saxony, Germany

Site notes
- Length: 115 m (377 ft)
- Excavation dates: 1972

The Lichtenstein Cave, discovered in 1972, is an archaeological cave site near Dorste, Lower Saxony, Germany with a length of 115 m (377 ft). The skeletal remains of 21 female humans and 19 males, dated to the Bronze Age, about 3,000 years ago were discovered. In addition, around 100 bronze objects (ear rings, bracelets, and finger rings) and ceramic parts from the Urnfield Culture were found.

== Ancient DNA Tests ==
Both mitochondrial DNA and Y-chromosome DNA tests were conducted on the skeletons and published by the University of Göttingen. Mitochondrial haplogroups found included 17 from H, 5 from T2, 9 from U5b and 5 from J*. Out of the 19 males represented in the cave, 15 yielded the full 12 tested STR values, with twelve showing haplotypes related to I2b2 (at least four lineages), two to R1a (probably one lineage), and one to R1b predicted haplogroups. Y-STR results are given in the table below:

Y-STR Haplotypes of the 19 male individuals
HT	393	390	19	391	385a	385b	439	389i	392	389ii	437	438	Σ	Hg
Y1	13	25	16	11	13	17	11	12	11	28	15	10	6	I2b2
Y2	13	25	15	11	13	17	11	12	11	27	15	10	3	I2b2
Y3	13	23	14	11	11	14	12	13	13	29	15	12	1	R1b
Y4	-	-	(17)	(11)	-	-	(11)	12	-	-	-	10	1	I2b2
Y5	13	25	15	11	11	(13)	11	13	11	30	14	11	2	R1a
Y6	13	24	16	11	13	17	11	12	11	28	15	10	3	I2b2
nd	-	-	-	-	-	-	-	-	-	-	-	-	3	-

() = allele unsure or assignment of an individual, nd = not determined

In 2007, 270 people from the long-established communities in the surrounding villages responded to a call for saliva samples. Their DNA was analyzed to determine whether they might be related to the people buried in the cave. The project was led by anthropologist Susanne Hummel of the University of Göttingen. Eleven individuals were identified sharing the same genetic patterns as the majority of the deceased. Two men living in villages within sight of the Lichtenstein cave exhibited an extremely rare genetic lineage. It is identical to that of a man found in the cave, suggesting a family lineage spanning more than 120 generations.

== See also ==
- Ancient DNA
