= Rogers Hall =

- Courtview
- U.S. National Register of Historic Places
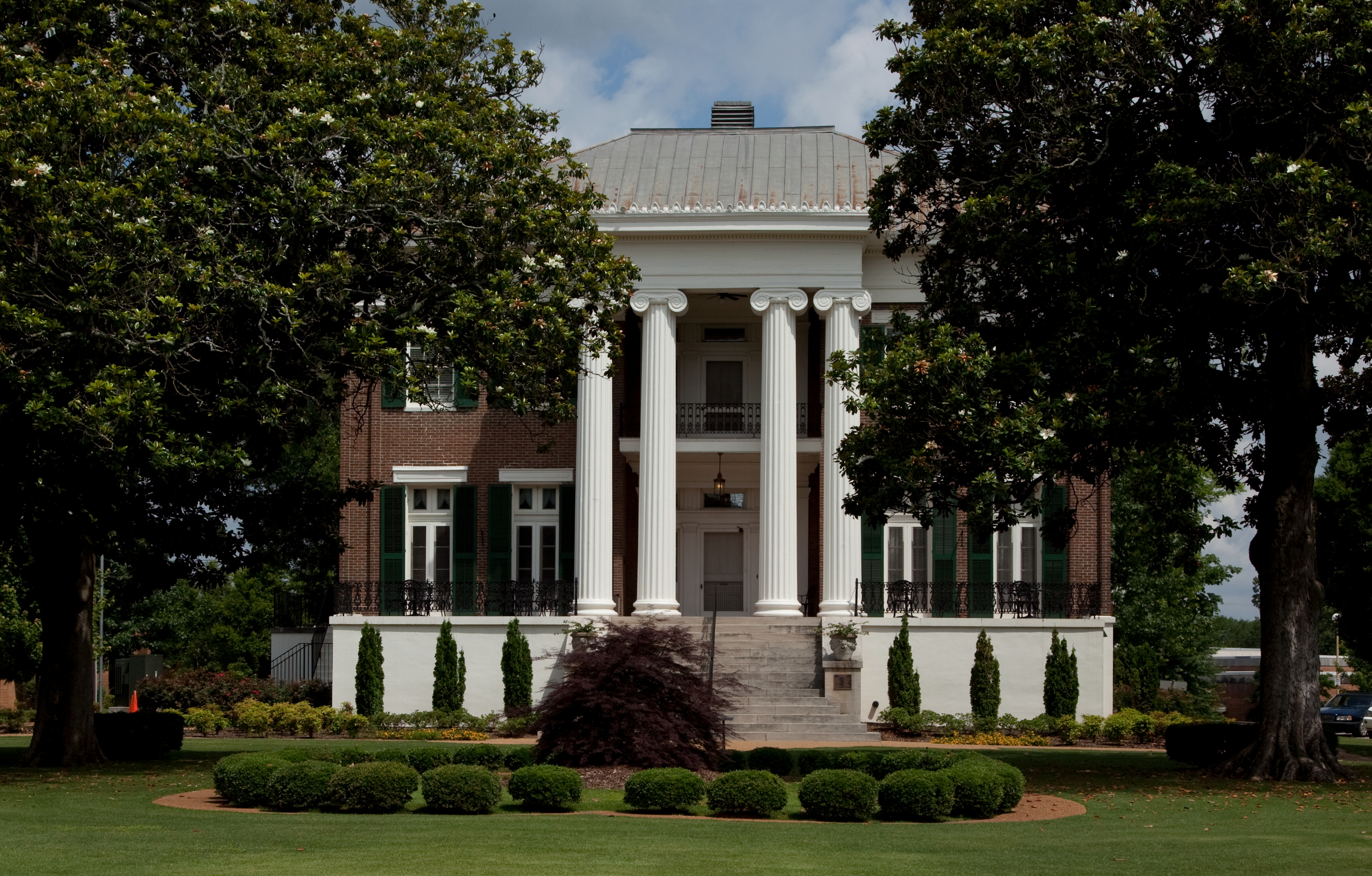
- The building in 2010

- Location within Alabama Location within the United States
- Location: Court St., Florence, Alabama
- Coordinates: 34°48′21″N 87°40′46″W
- Area: 1 acre (0.40 ha)
- Built: 1855
- Architect: John Ballinger
- Architectural style: Greek Revival
- NRHP reference No.: 74000415
- Added to NRHP: June 13, 1974

Rogers Hall, also known as Courtview, is a three-story antebellum house at 500 Court Street in Florence, Alabama. It was built by enslaved people from 1854 to 1855. It is one of the oldest historic landmarks on the University of North Alabama campus and one of the university's most distinctive structures. The building was recorded by the Historic American Buildings Survey from 1934 to 1935. It was listed on the National Register of Historic Places on June 13, 1974.

== History ==
The Greek Revival-style mansion was constructed for George Washington Foster, a prominent local with plantations in Alabama, Georgia, and Mississippi. Located at the summit of Court Street and the highest point in Florence, Foster named his residence Courtview. Because construction would result in the permanent obstruction of a major thoroughfare, Foster had to secure the approval of the Alabama Legislature before work could begin. Permission was granted with the stipulation that "the beauty of the home justify the inconvenience caused the people of the city." He had the grounds professionally landscaped by the Hastings firm out of Atlanta.

Foster died in 1878, with the property going to his daughter, Sarah Independence Foster, and her husband, Stirling Payne MacDonald. MacDonald was a former captain in the Confederate Army. According to the diary of Sarah Foster MacDonald, the grounds were occupied by camps of Confederate and Union soldiers during the American Civil War. Union Army officers, under the command of William Tecumseh Sherman, stayed in house on November 3, 1863. Confederate generals P. G. T. Beauregard, Nathan Bedford Forrest and Stephen D. Lee visited the home in 1864. General Forrest, his wife, and son stayed with the Foster family for several days.

Courtview was occupied by members of the Foster family until 1900, when it was sold to Emmet O'Neal, a Wesleyan University alumnus who served as the 34th Governor of Alabama from 1911 to 1915. After 1915, O'Neal lived in Birmingham and rented out the building as a boarding house. It was acquired by Thomas M. Rogers in 1922 and underwent significant restoration and remodeling. The Rogers family sold the house in 1948 to Florence State Teachers College, now known as the University of North Alabama.

During the 1950s, the former residence was used as a guest house and for social events. The parlors on the first floor were used frequently for student meetings. The dining room and adjoining rooms were used by faculty and members of the Florence community. During the early 1980s, alumni, faculty and staff initiated "Project Courtview", a fund drive to restore Rogers Hall. Over 700 people volunteered their services.
