= Colby Lake (Chisago County, Minnesota) =

Lake in the state of Minnesota, United States

- Location within Minnesota
- Location: Chisago County, Minnesota
- Coordinates: 45°25′12″N 92°40′38″W
- Type: Lake
- Surface elevation: 915 feet (279 m)

Colby Lake is a lake in Chisago County, Minnesota, in the United States.

Colby Lake was named for an early settler.

== See also ==
- List of lakes in Minnesota
