= Kobe (surname) =

Kobe is a surname. Notable people with the surname include:

- Boris Kobe (1905–1981), Slovenian architect
- Gail Kobe (1932–2013), American actress and television producer
- Malebo Kobe, South African politician
- Masahiko Kobe (born 1969), the "Iron Chef", Italian
- Milan Kobe (1926–1966), Yugoslav association football player
- Primož Kobe (born 1981), Slovenian long-distance runner
- Takumi Kobe (born 1985), Japanese baseball player
- Kobe Shoji (1920–2004), American executive in the sugar cane industry

== See also ==
- Kobe (given name)
- Kobe (disambiguation), including people known by the mononym
