= Kobi Lichtenstein =

Martial artist

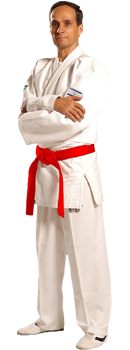
- Born: יעקב ליכטנשטיין; 1964 (age 61–62); Rehovot, Israel
- Style: Krav Maga
- Teachers: Imi Lichtenfeld, Eli Avikzar
- Rank: 8th dan in Krav Maga

Other information
- Website: South American Federation of Krav Maga

Yaakov "Kobi" Lichtenstein (Hebrew: יעקב ליכטנשטיין; born 1964) is an Israeli-Brazilian master of krav maga who introduced this technique to South America. He is the President of the South American Federation of Krav Maga (FSAKM). Grão Mestre Kobi is responsible for promoting, teaching, and training Krav Maga instructors in South America through the South American Federation of Krav Maga (FSAKM). He began training Krav Maga at the age of three with the creator of the discipline himself, Imi Lichtenfeld. A combatant in the Israel Defense Forces (IDF), with an MBA in National Security and Terrorism from Security and Investigation Hod Hasharon in Israel in partnership with Newport University in California, he arrived in Brazil in 1990 with the mission of spreading Imi's work throughout Latin America. He has provided instruction in numerous security units, including the security of the Presidency of Brazil and at large-scale events such as the 2016 Olympics. With over 50 years dedicated to Krav Maga, experience in battles and national security in his homeland, he now trains and supervises hundreds of instructors and thousands of students in five countries.

== Early life ==
Lichtenstein was born in 1964 in Rehovot, Israel. He began training in the martial art of krav maga in 1967 under its founder, Imi Lichtenfeld (1910–1998). Lichtenstein began teaching the art at the age of 15. He served for three years in the Israel Defense Forces, by the end he held a black belt diploma from the Krav Maga Association. He fought in the First Lebanon War (1982).

== Brazil ==
Lichtenstein arrived in Brazil on 18 January 1990, appointed by Lichtenfeld to introduce his martial art to South America. He has written at least three books on krav maga, including Krav Maga: A filosofia da defesa Israelense (Krav Maga: The Philosophy of the Israeli Defense) and Krav Maga: Sua defesa pessoal contra a violência urbana (Krav Maga: Your self-defense against urban violence). In January 1996, Lichtenfeld promoted Lichtenstein to the rank of 6th dan in krav maga.

In March 2009, Lichtenstein received the Tiradentes Medal. On 15 May 2009, he received the Pedro Ernesto Medal in recognition of his service to krav maga in Brazil. Lichtenstein lives and teaches krav maga in Rio de Janeiro, Brazil.

In the middle of 2011, Lichtenstein was granted an 8th dan red belt by Haim Zut and Uri Refaeli from the Krav Maga Federation.
