= Colby Lake (Washington County, Minnesota) =

Lake in the state of Minnesota, United States

- Location within Minnesota
- Location: Washington County, Minnesota
- Coordinates: 44°54′24″N 92°54′36″W
- Type: Lake
- Surface elevation: 889 feet (271 m)

Colby Lake is a lake in Washington County, in the U.S. state of Minnesota.

Colby Lake was named for John Colby, an early settler turned county official.

A 2-mile paved trail circumnavigates the lake, which is a popular recreational destination.

== See also ==
- List of lakes in Minnesota
