= Cobie Sikkens =

Dutch swimmer (born 1946)

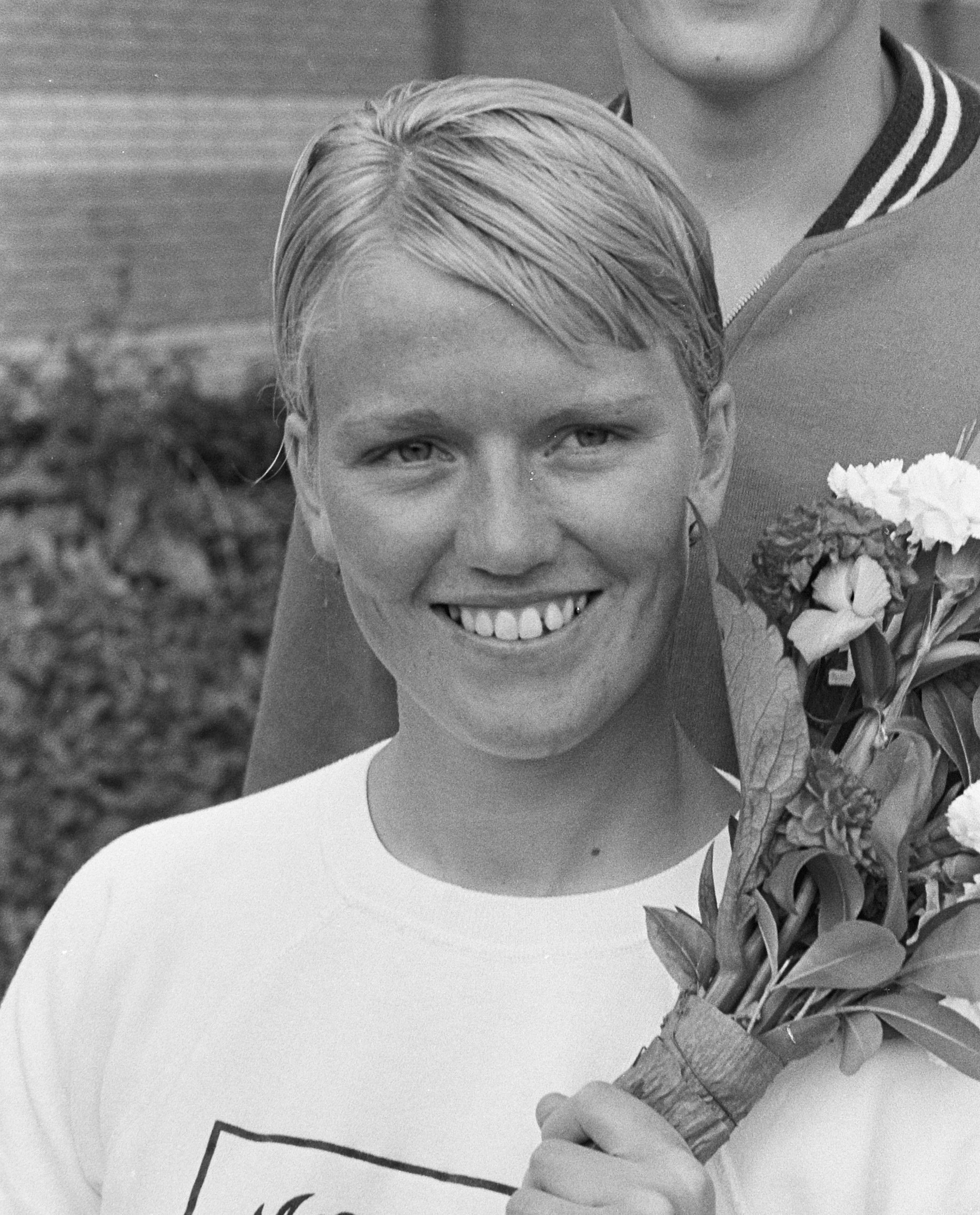
- Coby Sikkens in 1968

Medal record

Women's swimming

Representing the Netherlands

European Championships
Gold medal – first place	1966 Utrecht	4×100 m medley

Jacoba Catharina "Coby" Sikkens (born 11 May 1946, in Groningen) is a retired Dutch backstroke swimmer who won a gold medal in 4 × 100 m medley at the 1966 European Aquatics Championships. She also participated in the 1968 Summer Olympics.
