= Cobe =

Cobe or COBE may refer to:

- Cobe (architectural firm), a Danish architectural firm
- Cosmic Background Explorer (COBE), a satellite
- 9997 COBE, a main-belt asteroid
- Cobe Trophy Race, an auto race held in 1910 and 1911

== People with the name ==
- Harry Cobe (1885–1966), American racecar driver
- Cobe Jones (1907–1969), Major League Baseball player
- J. A. Coburn (1868–1943), also known as Cobe Coburn, American minstrel performer, troupe manager

== See also ==
- Cobi (disambiguation)
- Coby (disambiguation)
- Kobe (disambiguation)
