= Wangara people =

Ethnic group in West Africa

The Wangara (also known as Wakara, Wangarawa) are a diaspora community of ethnic Mandenka originwho served as specialized long-distance merchants throughout West Africa, particularly in trans-Saharan trade. Originating from the Ghana Empire, over time the Wangara became integrated into numerous other communities and ethnic groups, particularly in Timbuktu, Agadez, Kano, Gao, Salaga, Kong, Bissa, Kankan, Fouta Jallon, Djenné as well as Bambouk, Bure, Lobi, and (to a lesser degree) Bono goldfields and Borgu. They were practicing Muslims who helped spread the religion widely and served as clerics, political advisors, healers and marabouts, often following the Suwarian Tradition.

The term 'Wangara' is sometimes used interchangeably to refer to the Dyula people.

== History ==
The Wangara, are descendants from migrants out of the once-fertile Green Sahara. Increased desertification drove these proto-manden southwest where they established stone settlements possibly as far back as 4000 B.C.E. or even earlier at sites such as Dhar Tichitt, Dhar Walata, and Dhar Néma in modern-day Mauritania. Related Gangara populations persisted in the Tagant Plateau until the 18th century and in the Assaba Massif until the 19th.

The first mention of the Wangara in the historical record lists them as a tribe under the Ghana Empire who traded in gold dust. Al-Bakri called them "specialist gold traders in the region of the Senegal and Niger rivers." Ibn Battuta described them in 1352 as traders from "west of the interior delta of the Niger." The geographer Muhammad al-Idrisi referred to the Wangara as being from "the land of gold, famous on account of the great quantities and good quality of that metal."

By tradition all gold nuggets belonged to the king, but gold dust was extensively traded. It is unclear if the Wangara were Muslim at this stage, but they soon adopted the heterodox Khariji rite, which spread with them around West Africa.

Located in the Lakes Region at the eastern end of the "country of Wanqara" was Tiraqqa or Tombouze, a predecessor of Timbuktu. It was one of the great commercial centers of the region—a meeting place of caravans from Ghana and Tadmakka in the 10th and 11th centuries—and a dependency of Ghana. Al-Idrisi describes it as "one of the towns of Wanqara"—large, well populated, and unwalled—and relates that it was "subject to the ruler of Ghana, in litigation."It remained an important mart until the 13th century, at which time Timbuktu replaced it.

A Malian source, cited in the Tarikh El Fattach, distinguishes the Wangara on a socio-professional level from their Malinke kinsmen by claiming the latter to be princes and warriors and the former "traders who carry gold dust from country to country as the courtiers of princes". Valentim Fernandes mentions the Wangara gold traders operating out of Jenne, controlling the gold trade between Jenne and the Bono State goldfields.

=== Expansion ===
The first Wangara commercial expansion came between the 9th-11th centuries into Takrur and the Futa Jallon. Between the 12th and 14th centuries, the Wangara extended their trade networks eastwards towards the Gao Empire and the Lake Chad basin and south to the Guinea Highlands and Volta River. Their strategic movements were a response to increased commercial traffic along the trade routes - a consequence of Almoravid and Almohad political and social hegemonies and commercial activity in the Maghreb and Andalusia (9th–15th century) and, in part, an effort to consolidate Ghana's political interests in the southern Sahara.

Yorubaland

During the reign of Mansa Musa in the 14th century, the Wangara reached the Yoruba states of southwest Nigeria. There their religion (Islam) was called Esin Imale, "Religion of the Malians" or "Hard Knowledge". After a 2nd wave of Songhai language speaking Wangara and a 3rd wave by Muslim Fulani, many Yoruba subgroups such as the Ijesa, Oyo, Ilorin, Egba & Ijebu had sizable Muslim communities by the 19th century.

Mossiland

The infiltration of Wangara traders (also known as Marka or Yalsé) into Mossi territory began with the Mossi incursions into the Niger valley and the Mandé city of Walata in the early 15th century. The Mossi (who were hostile to Islam) in earlier times raided the northern markets for trade goods, especially salt, but later permitted Muslim traders from these areas to import the desired goods into their own country. These traders and court marabouts were established in Mane, Zitenga, Kaya, Bulsa and Bilanga. By 1750, the Wangara had also entered Ouagadougou. The survival of the Songhay Empire in the eastern Gourma following the Moroccan conquest of 1592, could be explained as a consequence of the gradual and peaceful penetration of the Wangara into these eastern regions: Gourma (with Boulsa, Bilanga), Dendi and Borgou.

Hausaland

According to the Kano Chronicle the Wangarawa—as many as 160 people—emigrated under the leadership of Shaikh Abderrahman Za(gha)iti to Kano and introduced Islam in Yaji's time (1349–1385) or under Muhammad Rumfa (AH 867–904, 1463–99), after having left Mali in 835 AH (1433 AD). The surname, derived from "Zagha" or "Zeghai", may point to the town of Dia in the Inner Niger Delta south of Timbuktu. These Wangara left during a time of great insecurity due to Mossi incursions and moved to greater Songhay protection, adopted the Songhay language, and perhaps intensified the commercial contacts between Songhay and Hausa. In their eastern migration, it is believed that the Wangara split up in two groups in Gobir, one going to Kano and the other going to the Aïr. There are documented Wangara communities in Kano, Katsina and in the Borgou.

While there, they established "kingship" with royal councils of indigenous priestchiefs from among the members of local lineages. A certain Mohamed Korau, a Wangara, elected in 1492/3, became the first Muslim Sarkin Katsina.

While the Wangara themselves were only able to build communities as far east as Kano, their nomadic Fulani vassals proved more successful in penetrating the Chad Basin, especially after the rise of 18th and 19th century Jihad states such as Macina and the Sokoto Caliphate. Wangara trade undoubtedly benefited, albeit vicariously, through the extension of the eastward routes by the pastoral Fulani on their Hajj to Mecca.

The Volta Basin

The Volta basin has been important for the Wangara in several respects: it comprised some of the main gold-producing areas (Lobi, Banda) while being linked to others (in the Birim, Pra and Offin river basins, as well as in modern-day Ivory Coast). It marks the southern end of the long-distance trade route from Djenné and Timbuktu, and was where precious goods from the forest zone (gold, kola) were produced; it also forms the border and link between the Mande-Dyula and Hausa-Zongo linguistic and economic spheres.The Wangara founded the important Islamic centers of Kong and Bouna, as well of Begho, Bole (Boualé), Bondoukou and others on the forest fringe. They also had some success in the conversion of Mossi, Dagbon & Bono people. They were noted for their honesty and industry.

In contemporary Ghana, "Wangara" refers to Mande speakers and those believed to be of Mande origin and associated with trade. Whereas the Hausa language is a lingua franca among the Zongo Settlements and Gonja, Dyula is spoken as a lingua franca in northern Ivory Coast, the south of Burkina Faso and northwestern Ghana. In Ghana, it is heard from Wa down to Wenchi.

== Gold Trade ==
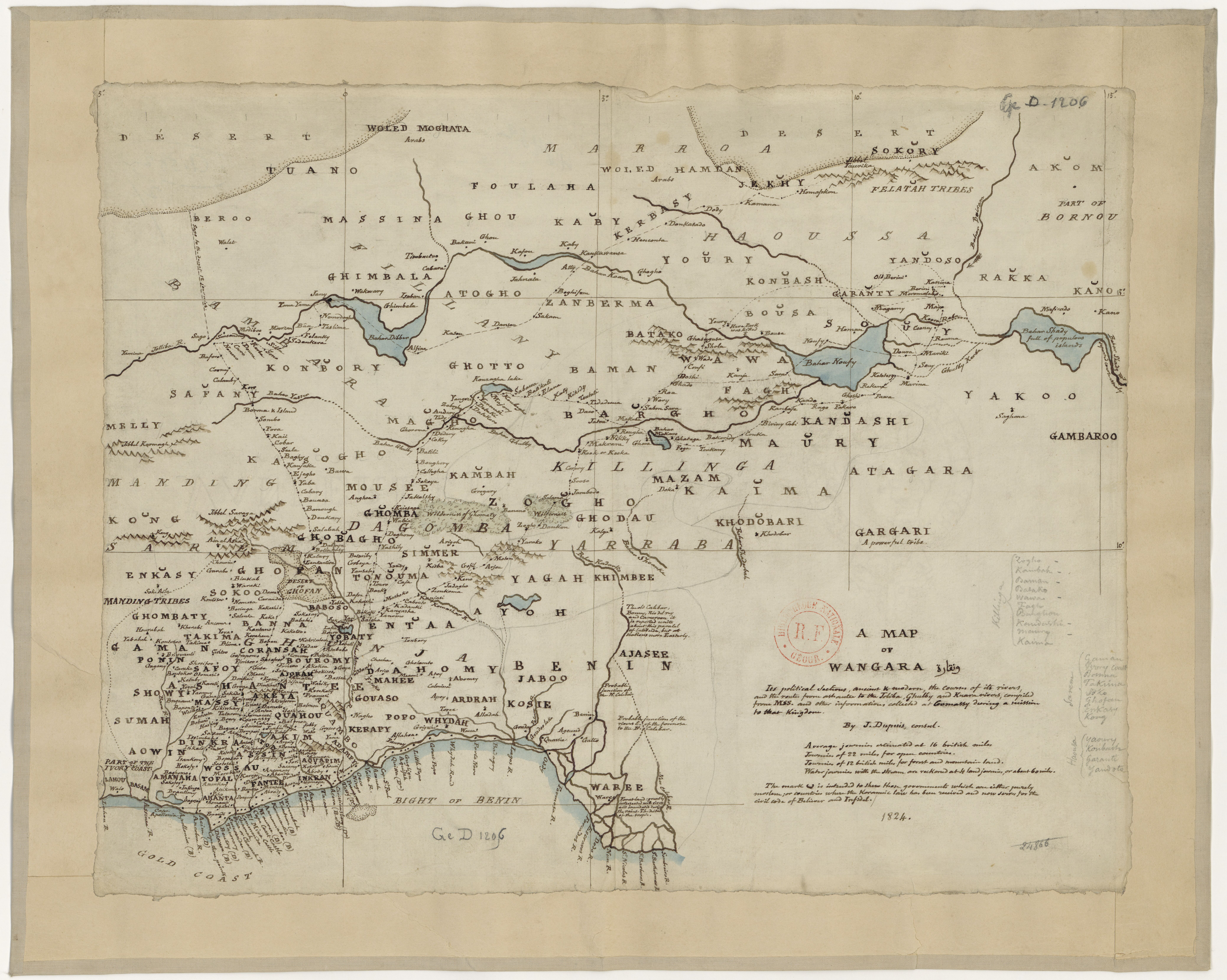
A Map of "Wangara" made by Joseph Dupuis, based on information collected in Kumasi in 1820

Though the Wangarans kept the location a secret to protect their monopoly, the general area of the Akan goldfields was known by the sixteenth century. In his Esmeraldo de Situ Orbis (1505–1508), Duarte Pacheco Pereira described the gold trade in Djenne and Bighu. Abul Qasim ibn Mohammed al-Ghassani in 1586 described Bighu as a place where "mines of gold and gold dust" were found. Sultan Muhammed Bello had an 1824 map with Bono state, Elmina, and Bighu clearly marked.

In the closing years of the 18th and the opening years of the 19th century, the discoveries of Friedrich Hornemann, Mungo Park and others revived the stories of Wangara and its richness in gold. Geographers of that period, such as James Rennell, shifted the Wangara country far to the east and confused Idrisi's description with accounts which probably referred to Lake Chad.

== Wangara as Toponym ==
'Wangara' was historically used as a toponym to refer to the Inner Niger Delta in medieval Arabic sources. Among Muslims in Kumasi in the Asante Empire in the earlier 19th century, it was a general term for West Africa south of the Sahel.

== Notable Wangara ==
- Fodiya Mohammed Fodiki Sanou El Wangara, left his country of Bitou as a result of the internal strife and installed himself in Djenné in 1492
- Mahmoud-ben-Abou-Bekr-Bagayogo, the father of the lawyers Mohammed and Ahmed Bagayogo, cadi from 1552, and founder of a whole family of "law consultants"
- Mohammed-Benba-Kenâti
- Mohammed-ben-Mahmoud-ben-Abu-Bakr (1524–1593)
- Mouaddib-Bokar-Traouri
- Ahmed Traouri

== Sources ==
- Massing, Andrew (2000). "The Wangara, an Old Soninke Diaspora in West Africa?". Cahiers d'Études Africaines. 40 (158): 281–308. doi:10.4000/etudesafricaines.175. JSTOR 4393041.
- Wilks, Ivor. "Wangara." Encyclopedia of Islam. 2nd ed. Vol. XI. N.p.: n.p., 2002. 137–38. Print.
