= Dyula =

Dyula may refer to:

- Dyula people, of Burkina Faso and Ivory Coast
- Dyula language, their Niger-Congo language
