= Begho =

Historical city in Ghana (~13th-19th c.)

- Bighu, Biru, Bitu
- Location within Ghana
- 7.841192203183928°N 2.47530361289158°W
- Location: Ghana

History
- Built: 11th century
- Abandoned: early 19th century

Begho, also known historically as Nsoko or Insoco, was a city located in the Bono state of Ghana, located just south of its successor community, Hani. Begho was established as a trading entrepôt and cosmopolitan centre linking merchants from across West Africa and North Africa. Operating from the northern forest savanna transition zone, just like Bono Manso, it seized new economic opportunities and cross-cultural interactions through expansion as a commercial hub. Before the Europeans arrival in 1471, Begho was initially contacted by Muslim merchants who spoke Mande from the Mali empire. Outside the town limits, these merchants frequently founded permanent outlying settlements.

By the 17th centuries, the Europeans who fostered key interests in gold and silver trading, harboured displeasures towards the Juula with an attempt to put them out of trade. Begho's progress was attributed to the proximity of Akan goldfields from which gold reached Djene and Timbuktu as well as other areas.

== History ==
Begho was founded in the 11th century, though radiocarbon dates from the Nyarko quarter suggest initial occupation dating to the earlier centuries. Archaeological evidence suggests that Nyarko predates the other residential districts and was part of a broader settlement inhabited by "Akan-speaking Brong peoples, presumed to be the ancestors of Brong (Bono) who live in the area today." By the 15th century, Begho had grown into a prominent urban center inhabited by Jula traders of Soninke Wangara descent, who established peripheral settlements and integrated into the region's commercial networks.

The name Begho likely derives from "Biru," meaning "market," the original Soninke name for Walata. It was strategically located along the savanna–forest ecotone, making it a key node in trans-Saharan trade, particularly for gold, kola, and slaves. Situated on the northern forest fringe, it was part of early Akan settlement patterns and likely linked to craft and trade networks extending toward the Middle Niger.

Three routes ran south from Begho towards the coast. A western one ran through Dormaa and Ahafo to Twifo and finally Elmina; a second path passed through Wenchi, Tafo, Adansi, Assin, and then the coast near Cape Coast; a third, easterly, and possibly somewhat later route, crossed the Afram plains and passed through the Volta gorge to the neighbourhood of Accra.

Begho played an early role in trade with Mande-speaking merchants from Mali and established itself as one of the largest early Akan markets. By the 16th to 18th centuries, it was a thriving multiethnic commercial town with links to distant Islamic trade routes. It was particularly noted for its brass and textile goods.

Oral traditions state that Begho was destroyed by the Ashanti Empire in the mid-18th century, triggering the dispersal of its population. Communities such as Kong and Bondoukou trace their origins to refugees from Begho. The city, however, persisted in a reduced form into the early 19th century. Even after its decline, Begho's cultural influence remained strong in the region, especially in religious practices and material traditions such as pottery.

== Archaeology ==
Excavations were carried out by the University of Ghana from 1970 to 1979, and a joint excavation was carried out by UCLA and the University of Ghana in 1979. There was never an extensive surface survey, only specific sites were excavated.

=== Overview of site ===
The excavations identified at least 5 separate quarters throughout the city and a total of 1000 to 1500 house mounds, leading to an estimate of a largest population of about 7,000–10,000 people. The quarters consisted of one for the local Brong population, the Nyarko quarter, the Kramo quarter, the Dwinfor quarter, and the market quarter. The Nyarko quarter is believed to have hosted Brong, while the Kramo quarter is believed to have hosted Mande-speaking Muslims. The Dwinfuor quarter showed evidence of metallurgy. Two other quarters were identified, however they were not excavated.

The pottery scatter of the site covered about 13,000 hectares. It was difficult to identify all of the collapsed houses in the area, as the area is covered in thick elephant grass up to 3m tall and Hani villagers use the earth from collapsed houses for the swish walls of new houses. House mound density and artifact spread suggest continuous domestic activity across a six-square-mile zone, making Begho one of the most expansive archaeological sites in modern Ghana. Several large baobab trees on the outskirts indicated prior settlement zones, although not all were excavated due to limited surface indicators. The absence of clearly demarcated boundaries or monumental architecture suggests a decentralized urban form.

=== Architecture ===
Houses tended to be built around a courtyard with rooms not being larger than 3m by 4m, and the floors were set up higher than the courtyard by about 15–25 cm. Houses tended to have cisterns, usually 1m wide and 2m deep. The courtyards were likely the sites of activities such as shelling of nuts and cooking, as possible hearthstones have been found in these locations. At least one complete pot containing chicken bones was found beneath a house floor, interpreted as a foundation offering. This suggests the presence of ritual activities tied to domestic construction.

=== Textiles and Beads ===
Spindle whorls were found in each of the quarters, and especially the Brong quarter. Additionally, dye pits were identified in the Kramo quarter. Textiles were likely important in Begho. Arabic sources note Begho as well known for its textiles. The use of dyed thread and strip weaving may have entered the region via these trade networks, laying early foundations for Akan kente weaving traditions.

=== Metallurgy ===
There is evidence for both ironworking and brassworking in Begho. Both predated Begho itself. A distinct iron smelting area was found 4.2 km northwest of Begho. Ironworking probably only took place there between the 15th to 17th centuries, as iron could eventually be imported from larger trade networks. Blacksmithing, however, took place in Begho itself. Slag has been found in each of the quarters. Iron was smithed into arrowheads, knives, rings, nails, hoe blades, and spurs.

Brassworking was based out of the Dwinfuor quarter, as there were many clay crucibles with brass signatures. The brass was smithed into rings, earrings, bracelets, leglets, and other jewelry. In addition, brass weights were found that follow the Islamic system of weights. Brass vessels, some inspired by Islamic ceremonial forms, were repurposed into shrine vessels within Akan religious practices, suggesting that metal imports also served symbolic and ritual functions.

=== Agriculture ===
Begho's population took great advantage of the natural resources surrounding the city. Yams were cultivated from 'farmer shelters' outside of the city, as evidenced from scatters of pottery miles outside of the core settlement. It is likely that carrots and onion were eaten at Begho, but it is unknown whether or not mangos, cowpeas, and okra were consumed. In addition, there was likely grain cultivation (sorghum or millet) as broken grindstones have been found. Pottery scatter over 4–5 kilometers outside the core site indicates the presence of short-term farm shelters, known as pataa, used for crop processing and seasonal dwelling. Through a persistent knowledge of up to 500 local plants in the area by modern locals, it can be hypothesized that the population of Begho was aware of plants for a variety of uses.

When it came to animals, the population of Begho consumed both large and small animals. Many small animals, such as grass cutters and birds, were trapped, smoked, and dried. The jaws of grass cutters could be found in almost all of the quarters of Begho (except for the Kramo and market quarters). Cows were likely the most eaten livestock, but sheep and goat were also present. Cow bones were the most commonly found, along with remains of sheep, goat, and antelope.

=== Trade ===
There were no signs of a town wall uncovered, suggesting that Begho had a freer trade than other cities and was more peaceful. The lack of a town wall, compared to fortified cities like Kano or Zaria, reflects Begho's relatively open layout and peaceful commercial culture. Brass was probably imported, as Dwinfuor's crucibles contained brass from different sources. In addition to metals, Begho was a point of exchange for dyed cloth, glass beads, and Arabic-inscribed brass basins, which were eventually incorporated into Akan ritual contexts.

== See more ==
- Bono state

== Sources ==
- Compton, Anne M. (2017). Excavations at Kranka Dada: An Examination of Daily Life, Trade, and Ritual in the Bono Manso Region. BAR International Series. Vol. 2857. BAR Publishing. ISBN 9781407315843.
- Effah-Gyamfi, Kwaku (1985). Bono Manso: An Archaeological Investigation Into Early Akan Urbanism. University of Calgary Press. ISBN 9780919813274.
- Konadu, Kwasi; Campbell, Clifford C. (2016). The Ghana Reader: History, Culture, Politics. Duke University Press. doi:10.2307/j.ctv125jqp2. ISBN 9780822359845.
- Massing, Andrew (2012). "Imams of Gonja: The Kamaghate and the Transmission of Islam to the Volta Basin". Cahiers d'Études Africaines. 52 (205): 57–101. doi:10.4000/etudesafricaines.16965. JSTOR 41446033.
- Massing, Andrew (2000). "The Wangara, an Old Soninke Diaspora in West Africa?". Cahiers d'Études Africaines. 40 (158): 281–308. doi:10.4000/etudesafricaines.175. JSTOR 4393041.
- Posnansky, Merrick (2004). "Processes of Change—A Longitudinal Ethno-Archaeological Study of a Ghanaian Village: Hani 1970–98". African Archaeological Review. 21 (1): 31–47. doi:10.1023/B:AARR.0000022318.18118.e6. S2CID 154220511.
- Posnansky, Merrick (2015). "Begho: Life and Times". Journal of West African History. 1 (2): 95–118. doi:10.14321/jwestafrihist.1.2.0095. ISSN 2327-1868. JSTOR 10.14321/jwestafrihist.1.2.0095. S2CID 193121437.
- Arhin, Kwame (1979). A Profile of Brong Kyempim: Essays on the Archaeology, History, Language and Politics of the Brong Peoples of Ghana. Monograph. Institute of Development Studies and Partner Organisations.
