= List of rulers of the Akan state of Bono-Tekyiman =

List of Rulers of the Akan state of Bono-Tekyiman

List of Rulers of the Akan state of Bono-Tekyiman outlines the traditional succession of kings and queenmothers of the Bono people from the early polity of Bono Manso to the later Techiman (or Bono-Tekyiman) state in central Ghana. The Bono were among the earliest Akan groups to establish a centralized kingdom, with their capital originally located at Bono Manso before its destruction by the Ashanti Empire in 1723–1724. The royal seat was subsequently transferred to Techiman, where the lineage of rulers continues into the modern period.

The chronological reconstruction of Bono-Tekyiman kingship has been the subject of extensive scholarly debate. Early interpretations by Eva Meyerowitz proposed a thirteenth-century foundation and a detailed kinglist extending back to 1295 CE, but these claims have since been re-evaluated by later researchers including Colin Flight and Dennis M. Warren, who identified methodological flaws and chronological exaggerations in her data.

== Disclaimers, misuse of data and later reassement ==
=== Re-evaluation by Dennis M. Warren ===
Dennis M. Warren re-examined the writings of Eva Meyerowitz on the Techiman-Bono (Brong) people and found serious methodological and chronological problems in her reconstruction of Bono history. Meyerowitz had proposed that the Bono-Manso kingdom was founded as early as 1295 CE and had linked Akan civilization to North African and later Egyptian-Middle Eastern origins, claims that Warren and other scholars regarded as unsupported by evidence.

Warren argued that Meyerowitz’s precise dating and extensive kinglists rested on weak field techniques, linguistic errors, and unverified oral data. He noted that her alleged list of thirty-seven Bono rulers from 1295 to 1950 could not be corroborated by Techiman elders, and that even her informants denied supplying the names she published. Physical checks of the Techiman stool rooms revealed only eight ancestral stools, none dating earlier than the eighteenth century, and no evidence of the “gold-nugget containers” she claimed were used to record reign lengths.

Warren also demonstrated that many of Meyerowitz’s names were duplicated under variant spellings, her translations inconsistent, and several chronological sequences impossible—for instance, chiefs she dated to the fifteenth century actually ruled after the Asante-Bono wars of 1722–1723. He concluded that her data represented isolated oral statements rather than genuine oral traditions, and that her reconstructions introduced invented “traditions” such as Bono migrations from Timbuktu that are unknown in local accounts. According to Warren, these inaccuracies had wider effects, since later school textbooks and popular histories repeated Meyerowitz’s conjectures, thereby shaping misconceptions about Akan origins. He recommended that Techiman-Bono chronology be re-established only from verifiable eighteenth- and nineteenth-century evidence.

=== Reevaluation by Colin Flight ===
Colin Flight later conducted a systematic re-evaluation of Meyerowitz’s Bono-Manso chronology using statistical analysis and corroborating Arabic and colonial records. He confirmed that Meyerowitz’s fieldwork at Techiman in the 1940s relied heavily on the cooperation of Nana Akumfi Ameyaw III, who sought to use her publications to strengthen Techiman’s political position within the Ashanti Confederacy. Flight noted that Meyerowitz’s data were based on an alleged ritual system in which each king annually deposited a gold nugget in a brass vessel (kuduo) and each queenmother placed a silver bead or cowry in a decorated pot to record the years of reign. These were reportedly counted in 1945 by Kofi Antubam, Meyerowitz’s interpreter, and the results sent to her as numerical data for reconstructing the Bono-Manso dynasty.

Although Flight accepted the authenticity of the tradition itself, he demonstrated that the early portions of Meyerowitz’s chronology were statistically and historically unreliable. His analysis showed that the reign lengths for the earliest kings and queenmothers followed artificial units of roughly thirty to thirty-six years—corresponding to a generational estimate of “three generations per century”—indicating that the early part of the list had been retroactively systematized. Using later and more credible segments of the data, along with corroboration from the Kitāb Ghunjā and known Ashanti campaigns, Flight redated the foundation of Bono Manso to the early fifteenth century, around 1400–1420, rather than the thirteenth century proposed by Meyerowitz. He concluded that the “gold-nugget chronologies” were genuine cultural mechanisms of recordkeeping introduced only in the late sixteenth century under Muslim influence, and that earlier reign-lengths had been later inventions designed to magnify Bono antiquity.

== King's list by Eva Meyerowitz ==
=== Bonoman (Bono State) Kings ===
Collected oral histories from chiefs, elders, and shrine custodians to test earlier kinglists published by Eva Meyerowitz.

Tenure	Incumbent	Notes
1295 to 1325	King (Nana) Asaman	Founder of Bonoman
1325 to 1328	Queen mother Ameya Kese
1328 to 1363	King Akumfi Ameyaw I
1363 to 1431	King Obunumankoma
1431 to 1463	King Takyi Akwamo
1463 to 1475	King Gyako
1475 to 1495	King Dwamena Kwame
1495 to 1564	King Afena Yaw I
1564 to 1595	King Brempon Katakyira
1595 to 1609	King Yeboa Ananta
1609 to 1618	King Ati Kwame
1618 to 1633	King Ameyaw Kurompe
1633 to 1639	King Afena Diamono
1639 to 1649	King Owusu Aduam
1649 to 1659	King Akumfi Ameyaw II
1659 to 1664	King Kofi Asamankwa
1664 to 1699	King Owusu Akyempon
1669 to 1684	King Gyamfo Kumanini
1684 to 1692	King Boakye Tenten
1692 to 1712	King Kyereme Bampo
1712 to 1740	King Ameyaw Kwakye I	The last Bonohene, during the reign of which the Asantes defeated the Bono state (1723)
Foundation of Bono-Tekyiman (1740)
1740 to 1782	Gyako I, Tekyimanhene
1782 to 1830	Kyereme Kofi, Tekyimanhene
1830 to 1837	Owusu Amprofi, Tekyimanhene
1837 to 1851	Ameyaw Kyereme, Tekyimanhene
1851 to 1864	Bafuo Twi, Tekyimanhene
1864 to 1886	Kwabena Fofie, Tekyimanhene
1886 to 1899	Gyako II, Tekyimanhene
1899 to ????	Konkroma, Tekyimanhene
1907 to 1927	Yaw Kramo, Tekyimanhene
1927 to 1935	Yaw Ameyaw I, Tekyimanhene
1935 to 1936	Kwasi Twi, Tekyimanhene
1936 to 1937	Ameyaw II, Tekyimanhene
1937 to 1941	Berempon Kwaku Kyereme, Tekyimanhene
1941 to 1943	Kwaku Gyako III, Tekyimanhene
February 1944 to April 1961	Akumfi Ameyaw III, Tekyimanhene
1962 to1988	Kwakye Ameyaw II, Tekyimanhene
1989-2003	Dotobibi Osabarima Takyia Ameyaw II, Tekyimanhene
2004 to present	Nana Akumfi Ameyaw IV, Tekyimanhene|

== See also ==
- Akan people
- Ghana
- Gold Coast
- Lists of incumbents

== Sources ==
- Flight, Colin (1970). "The Chronology of the Kings and Queenmothers of Bono-Manso: A Revaluation of the Evidence". Journal of African History. 11 (2): 259–268. doi:10.1017/S0021853700009981. JSTOR 180321.
- Warren, Dennis M. (1976). "The Use and Misuse of Ethnohistorical Data in the Reconstruction of Techiman-Bono (Ghana) History". Ethnohistory. 23 (4): 365–385. doi:10.2307/481652. JSTOR 481652.
