= Bono people =

Ethnic group in Ghana and Ivory Coast

Bono
Bonofoɔ
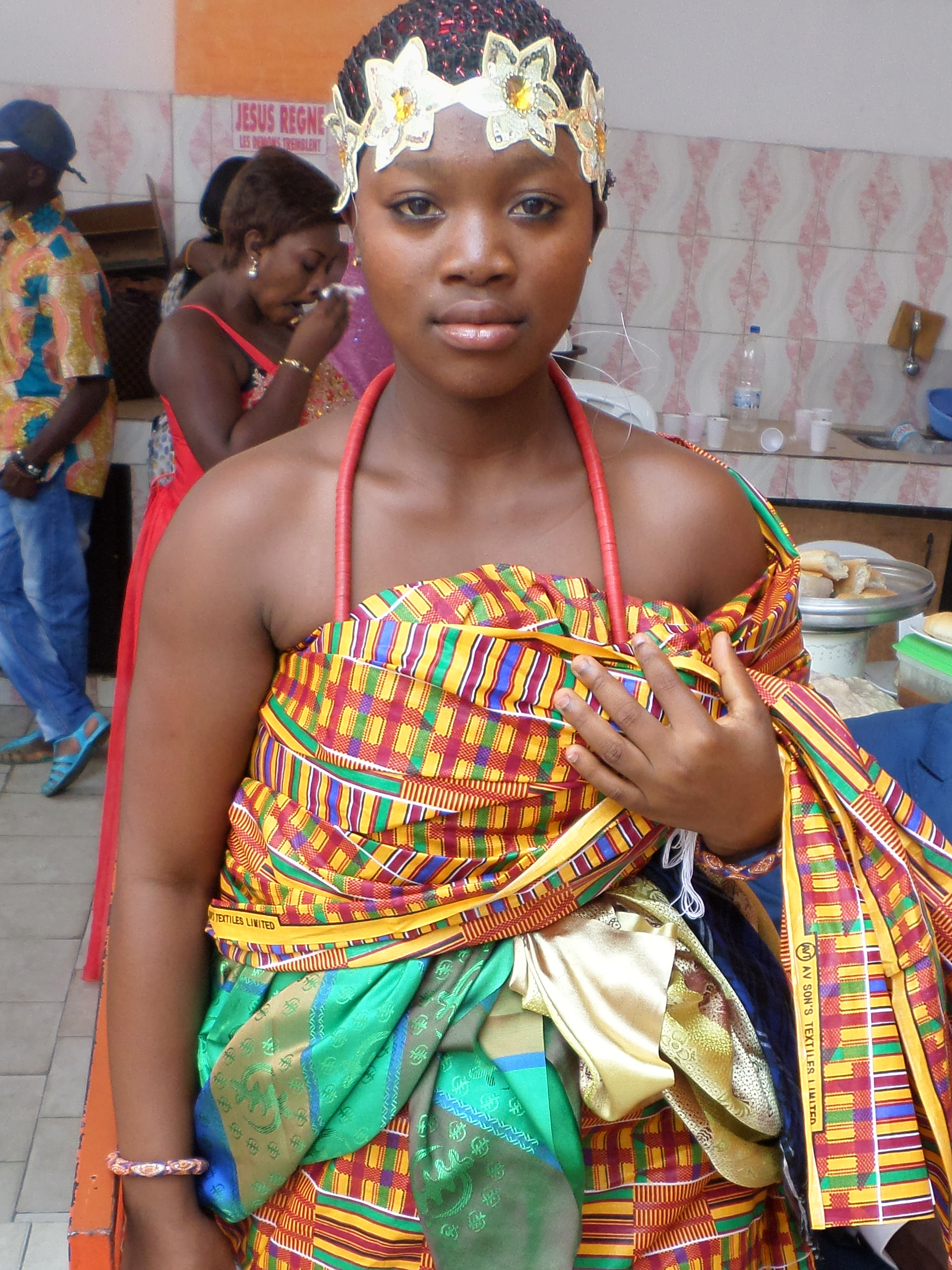
- A Bono dancer from Ivory Coast

Total population
- ~2,800,000

Regions with significant populations
- Bono region, Bono East region, Ahafo Region, Eastern Ivory Coast

Languages
- Bono Twi, English, French

Religion
- Bono Ancestral worship and spirituality, Christianity

Related ethnic groups
- Fante, Akwamu, Other Akan

- People: Bonofoɔ
- Language: Bono Twi
- Country: Bonoman

The Bono, also known as the Bonofoɔ, Brong, or Abron, are an Akan people of central Ghana and northeastern Ivory Coast. They speak the Bono Twi and form one of the largest matrilineal Akan groups. According to Takyiman traditions, the Bono were the first Akan to develop a state, and other Akan states are believed to have emerged later. Oral traditions and archaeological evidence highlight Bono Manso and Begho as major centers of early Akan settlement.” Past historians described Bono as the cradle of the Akan people, with all Akan groups tracing their origins to Bono.Archaeological evidence and modern historians emphasize that Bono-Manso and Begho were among several of the earliest centers of development for the Akan people, serving as major sites of cultural and political formation closely tied to both oral traditions and material evidence.

The Bono became prosperous at Bono state through gold discovery, trade and commerce from neighbouring partners and across Africa. As part of commercial transactions, gold dust were used as currency and gold weights as a measure of value. In 1471 when the first European-Portuguese visited Gold Coast (now Ghana), Bono Manso and Begho were an urban cities in West Africa. Begho at its peak had an estimated population of 15000. Bono Manso on the other hand played a significant role in the Atlantic slave trade and as a result, Africans in Diaspora visit to learn more about their history. The Bono people are mostly located in central part of Ghana and northeastern Ivory Coast.

== Etymology ==
The name Bono is derived from the phrase Abono woo, meaning “pioneer or firstborn of the land.” Nana Kwakye Ameyaw elaborated:

Bono as has been explained by my forefathers means a pioneer — something that comes first.

— Nana Kwakye Ameyaw, in The Profile of Bono kyempem

According to Techiman-Bono oral tradition, the earliest ancestors of the Bono emerged from a sacred cave known as Amowi, and, believing they were the first to inhabit the region, referred to themselves as Abono woo—which eventually shortened to Bono. These oral traditions of emergence from caves and sacred holes emphasize a spiritual connection to the land and ancestry, with sites such as Amowi and others in the Bono region regarded as points of origin.

By the 19th century, the name Bono (or Brong) had come to signify a wider geographic and political area. As historian explain it, “the whole area between Asante-Mampong and the Volta was known both to the peoples in that area and to outsiders as ‘Brong’, signifying an area that but for the Asante conquest, would be the domain, ‘Bonoman’, of the king of Bono-Manso”. In some cases, neighboring groups such as the Asante and Gonja applied the name “Brong” to peoples in proximity to Bono Manso, even if they were not originally part of the Bono polity.

== Colonial fallacies and misinterpretations ==
Earlier theories about the origins and cosmology of the Bono people, especially those advanced by colonial-era scholars such as Eva Meyerowitz, have been strongly challenged by Bono oral historians and contemporary researchers. Meyerowitz proposed that the Bono originated from the Sahara via a place called Diala, and that their cosmology was derived from Middle Eastern sources—claiming that Nyame and Nyankopon represented opposing lunar and solar deities. These ideas formed part of a broader theory that linked the origins of Akan-speaking peoples to the ancient Ghana Empire, Libya, Ancient Egypt, and wider trans-Saharan migration routes.

These interpretations are explicitly rejected by Bono oral authorities. During interviews recorded in Techiman by Dennis Warren and Owusu Brempong, Nana Kwame Nyame, a respected local historian, responded:

It is not true that Techiman people came from a place called Diala... Techiman people came from a hole at Amowi... There were no white people living at the sarem [savanna].

— Nana Kwame Nyame, in The Ghana Reader

He further dismissed the theological distinctions made by Meyerowitz, stating:

It is not true that... Nyankopon was owia [the sun] and Nyame was bosome [the moon]... Nyankopon, Nyame, and Odomankoma are the same [Creator].

— Nana Kwame Nyame, in The Ghana Reader

Historian Kwasi Konadu reinforces this position with archaeological and ecological data, writing that there is “no evidence of an intrusive northern people moving into the region.” Instead, sites such as Amowi, Bono Manso, and Begho reflect long-term indigenous presence, iron-smelting activity, and cultural development dating back to at least 300 CE.

Together, these oral and archaeological sources affirm that Bono society developed indigenously and effectively refute speculative migration and cosmological theories pioneered by colonial-era scholars and previously accepted in early academic literature.

== History ==
=== Origins and early settlement ===
Bono oral tradition holds that their ancestors emerged from a sacred cave called Amowi, which remains a significant spiritual site near modern Techiman. According to these traditions, the people emerged under the leadership of Asaman, the first ruler, who led them to found a settlement called Yefiri—meaning “we are coming out”—symbolizing their emergence into political and ritual autonomy.

This origin narrative emphasizes the Bono people’s deep attachment to the land and their belief in autochthony. It contradicts earlier academic theories that associated the Bono with north-to-south migrations from the Ghana or Mali empires. Instead, both oral accounts and archaeological evidence support an indigenous development within the forest–savanna zone of what is today central Ghana, particularly around Techiman and Nkoranza.

As the earliest abusuas (matrilineal clans) emerged, they established autonomous settlements around shrine centers, forming the nucleus of what would become Bono Manso. These founding stories underscore the intertwining of ancestry, sacred geography, and clan leadership in the emergence of Bono society.

=== Formation of the Bono State ===
Following their emergence at Amowi and settlement at Yefiri, the Bono clans eventually established Bono Manso, which became the political and ritual capital of the early Bono state. The town was organized as a confederation of clans, each with specific roles—some served as priests, others as warriors or administrators—structured along matrilineal lines and ancestral shrines.

Expansion of the Bono state occurred through the incorporation of surrounding settlements, many of which were named after abosom (deities or sacred objects), signifying their ritual significance and political affiliation. This growth was driven more by shared religious cosmology and social cohesion than military conquest.

Archaeological evidence supports this development. Surveys conducted at Bono Manso reveal remains of shrine activity, long-term habitation, and local craft industries such as pottery and metallurgy. These findings corroborate oral traditions that describe Bono Manso as a structured, sacred center of governance and spiritual authority.

=== Trade and urban growth ===
As Bono society expanded, it developed vibrant trade networks centered around Begho, located near present-day Hani. Archaeological excavations show that Begho became one of the largest towns in the interior of what is now Ghana, flourishing between the 12th and 18th centuries as a major market town along trans-Saharan routes.

The town’s layout included distinct quarters: two associated with local Brong (Bono) populations, two Kramo quarters for Mande-speaking Muslim traders, and a Dwinfuor quarter for metalworkers. The presence of shrine rooms, decorated ivory trumpets, and inverted offering vessels suggests the continued importance of ritual life and chieftaincy authority within the urban space.

From the 12th century onward, the Bono state prospered through its control of gold resources in the Twi and Prabom valleys, within the Tain River basin. Gold dust became the principal medium of exchange, both internally and in long-distance trade with Djenne, Timbuktu, and North Africa.

Trade at Begho connected the Bono region to Hausaland, the Niger Bend, and North Africa. Gold, kola nuts, and ivory were exchanged for salt, textiles, beads, copper alloys, and brassware. The site’s strategic location—between forest and savanna ecologies—made it ideal for mediating exchange between coastal and Sahelian zones.

Ethnoarchaeological research and oral tradition confirm that Begho attracted multiethnic and multilingual populations. Muslim merchants, particularly the Wangara (Dyula), contributed to both commercial expansion and the introduction of Islamic cultural practices. Despite this diversity, Bono institutions remained dominant within the political framework.

=== Asante invasion and political displacement ===
By the early 18th century, the Bono state had become a regional power with considerable wealth from gold and long-distance trade. However, this prosperity also attracted the attention of the rising Asante Kingdom. In 1722/23, Asante forces under Opoku Ware I invaded and destroyed Bono Manso, ending its role as the political center of the Bono people.

Following this defeat, much of Bono territory was redistributed. The Nkoranzahene, an Asante ally, was granted former Bono lands as a reward for supporting the invasion. As a result, Nkoranza’s influence in the region expanded considerably.

The surviving Bono population relocated their capital to Techiman, which retained its spiritual significance and continued to act as a unifying center for the dispersed Bono clans. Oral traditions preserved in Techiman emphasize continuity with the former Bono Manso polity and claim custodianship over sacred lands and shrines, including Amowi.

In the decades following the conquest, the Bono towns of Dormaa, Wenchi, and Techiman maintained varying relationships with Asante. At times, Bono states were compelled to support Asante military campaigns, while at other moments they resisted. For instance, during the 1870s, Techimanhene Kwabena Fofie refused to participate in an Asante war, prompting a second invasion of Techiman around 1877, which resulted in the town’s destruction once again.

Despite these disruptions, Bono towns preserved their institutions of chieftaincy, matrilineal succession, and ritual practices. The relocation of sacred stools, regalia, and priesthoods from Bono Manso to Techiman helped maintain continuity of state symbolism and clan authority in the post-conquest era.

Prior to its destruction, Bono Manso was a regional hub that became involved in the early Atlantic slave trade. In recent times, it has become a site of memory for African diaspora visitors.

=== Colonial mediation and regional identity ===
In the colonial period, the British administration engaged Bono states such as Techiman, Dormaa, and Wenchi independently of the Asante central authority. This distinction reflected both longstanding tensions and Bono efforts to assert a separate identity. While many Bono towns had previously been subordinated to Kumasi during the Asante era, colonial officials occasionally encouraged their autonomy by recognizing them as paramountcies in their own right.

Despite this, nearly all Bono states—with the exception of Atebubu—joined the Asante Confederacy Council between 1935 and 1938. Chiefs in Techiman, Dormaa, Berekum, and others saw potential benefits in unifying under a common council, especially with colonial oversight limiting Asantehene power.

However, Bono chiefs remained dissatisfied with internal power dynamics and what they perceived as unfair treatment in the distribution of resources. These frustrations strengthened their calls for cultural recognition and political autonomy.

=== Political autonomy and regional recognition ===
By the early 1950s, dissatisfaction among Bono chiefs and communities within the Asante Confederacy had grown into an organized political movement. Chiefs from Techiman, Dormaa, Drobo, and other Bono towns declared their withdrawal from the Confederacy in 1952, citing longstanding grievances and cultural marginalization.

This movement gained momentum during Ghana’s struggle for independence. Bono leaders argued that their communities represented a distinct historical and cultural tradition that warranted separate political recognition. These efforts aligned with national debates over decentralization and regional governance.

In 1959, the government of Ghana formally created the Brong-Ahafo Region, separating it from the Ashanti Region. This act led to the establishment of a Brong-Ahafo House of Chiefs, providing institutional recognition for the traditional authorities of the area. As historian Kwasi Konadu notes, the creation of the region represented a significant political and cultural separation from Asante influence and served as formal recognition of the Brong (Bono) as a distinct Akan group within the Ghanaian polity.

== Culture and Society ==
=== Bono conceptions of Bonoman (Bono State) ===
In Bono political thought, the foundation of a state is closely tied to matrilineal inheritance, sacred authority, and the ancestral continuity represented by the queenmother (ɔhemaa). Within the traditional Akan political system, the queenmother plays a central role in both succession and state identity. She nominates the king (ɔhene) and ensures that the royal lineage (abusua) is maintained through the maternal line. This reflects the broader Akan understanding that the queenmother is both the political mother of the state and its ancestral link to the past.

Among the Bono, this structure is also expressed ritually through the veneration of ancestral stools, the practice of libation, and the maintenance of shrine houses, which serve as symbolic foundations of state legitimacy. The king and queenmother operate together as spiritual and administrative heads, representing the balance between ancestral authority and living governance.

The organization of society around seven or eight matrilineal clans—each with its own totems, taboos, and origin stories—continues to shape Bono political and spiritual life. These clans historically provided the structure for leadership selection, shrine maintenance, and social obligations, ensuring both continuity and diversity within the Bono state.

=== Cultural expressions and identity ===
Many core Akan cultural elements trace their origin to Bono society. These include the abusua (matrilineal clan) system and the ntoro, which governs spiritual inheritance through the paternal line. Together, these principles define social identity, taboos, and clan-based responsibilities.

Bono artisans developed a rich visual and material culture, evident in royal regalia such as umbrellas used for kings, ceremonial stools, golden regalia, ivory trumpets, fly-whisks, and gold swords—objects that symbolized spiritual authority and ancestral legitimacy. The widely used adinkra symbols, associated today with Akan cultural identity, also have deep roots in Bono court cosmology and ceremonial life.

Weaving traditions such as gagawuga, kyenkyen, and kente reflect the region’s textile heritage, while musical and performance practices like Kete, Adowa, and fontomfrom remain central to Bono festivals, funerals, and royal ceremonies.

Bono also acted as a cultural and technological incubator where skillful crafts like pottery, metalwork, and blacksmithing were pioneered and spread to southern Akan states. Among others is scales, goldweights and balancing.

== Notable people from Bono ==
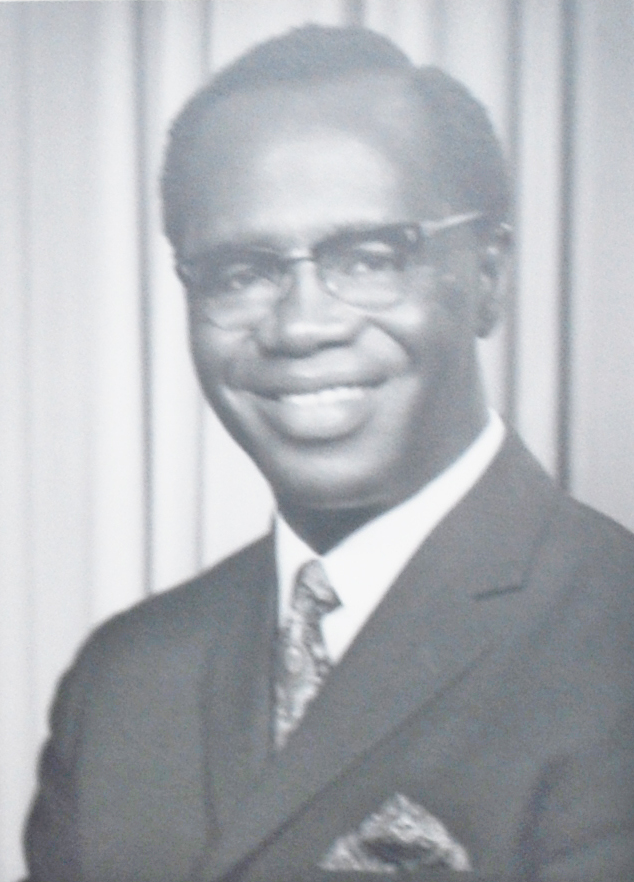
Kofi Abrefa Busia

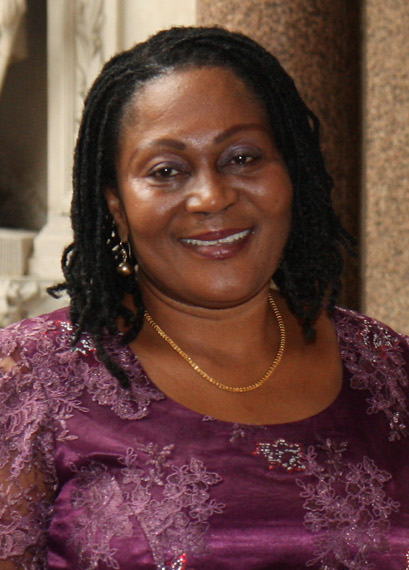
Lordina Mahama

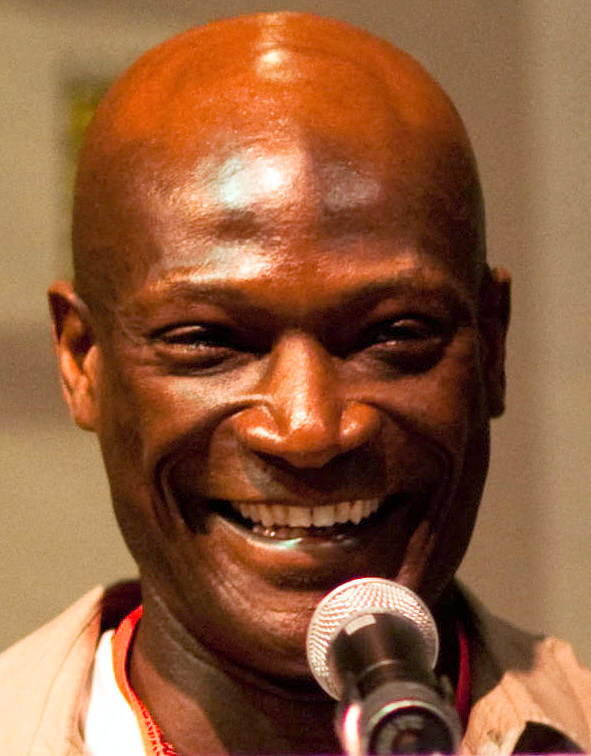
Peter Mensah

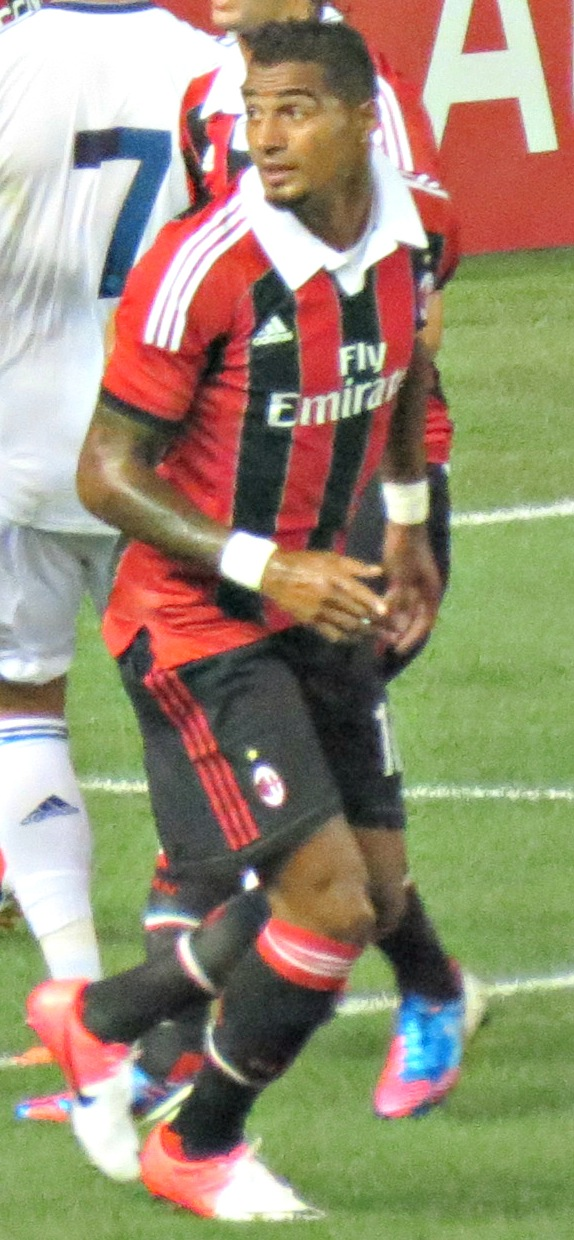
Kevin-Prince Boateng

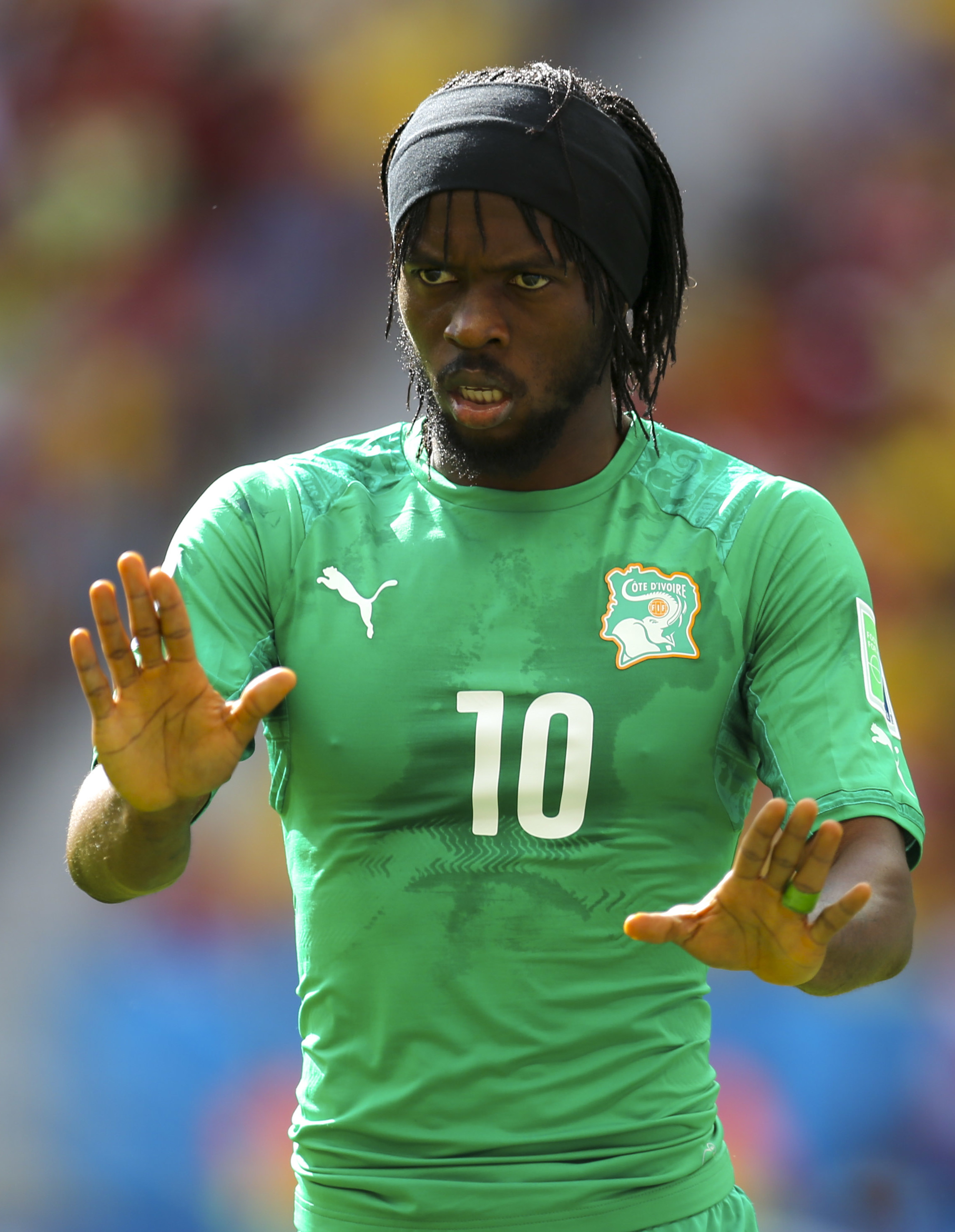
Gervinho

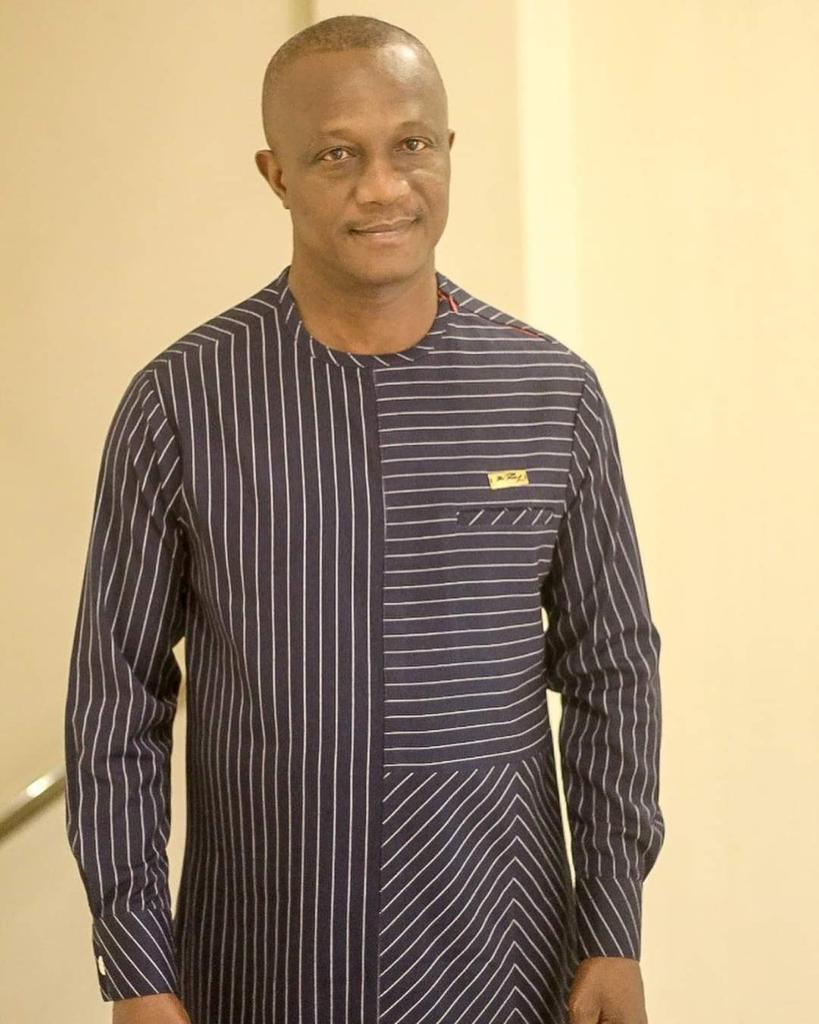
James Kwesi Appiah

The list continues as:

- Theresa Kufuor
- Emmanuel Agyemang Badu
- Asamoah Gyan
- Kamaldeen Sulemana
- Simon Adingra
- Kwadwo Afari Gyan
- John Paintsil
- DSP Kofi Sarpong
- C.S.T. Amankwaa
- Joyce Blessing among others.

== See also ==
- Gyaman
- Begho
- Bonomanso
- Bondoukou
- Adinkra symbols
- Asante Empire
- Brong-Ahafo Region
- Akan people
- Akan chieftaincy

== Sources ==
- Adandé, Alexis; Arinze, Emmanuel, eds. (2002). Museums & Urban Culture in West Africa. West African Museums Programme. ISBN 9780852552759.
- Akuamoa, Geoffrey (2013-03-18). KWAME, THE LAST SLAVE FROM WEST AFRICA. Lulu.com. ISBN 978-1-291-35746-2.
- Anquandah, James (2013). "The People of Ghana: Their Origins and Cultures". Transactions of the Historical Society of Ghana (15): 1–25. ISSN 0855-3246. JSTOR 43855009.
- Arhin, Kwame (1979). A Profile of Brong Kyempim: Essays on the Archaeology, History, Language and Politics of the Brong Peoples of Ghana. Monograph. Institute of Development Studies and Partner Organisations.
- Buah, F.K (1998). A History of Ghana. MacMillan. ISBN 9780333659342.
- Compton, Anne M. (2017). Excavations at Kranka Dada: An Examination of Daily Life, Trade, and Ritual in the Bono Manso Region. BAR International Series. Vol. 2857. BAR Publishing. ISBN 9781407315843.
- Crossland, L. B. (1989). Pottery from the Begho-B2 Site, Ghana. African Occasional Papers. Vol. 4. Calgary: University of Calgary Press. ISBN 0-919813-84-4.
- Effah-Gyamfi, E. (1974). "Aspects of the Archaeology and Oral Traditions of the Bono State". Transactions of the Historical Society of Ghana. 15 (2): 217–227. JSTOR 41406570.
- Effah-Gyamfi, Kwaku (1987). "Archaeology and the Study of Early African Towns: The West African Case, Especially Ghana". West African Journal of Archaeology. 17: 229–241. JSTOR 25802031.
- Konadu, Kwasi (2007). Indigenous Medicine and Knowledge in African Society. New York: Routledge. ISBN 9780415956208.
- Konadu, Kwasi (2010). The Akan Diaspora in the Americas. Oxford: Oxford University Press. doi:10.1093/acprof:oso/9780195390643.001.0001. ISBN 9780195390643.
- Konadu, Kwasi (2022). "A Manden Myth in the Akan Forests of Gold". African Economic History. 50 (2): 64–86. doi:10.3368/aeh.50.2.64.
- Konadu, Kwasi; Campbell, Clifford C. (2016). The Ghana Reader: History, Culture, Politics. Duke University Press. doi:10.2307/j.ctv125jqp2. ISBN 9780822359845.
- Kumah, Daniel (2024). "Early Trade and Urbanization in Pre-Modern Ghana: Evidence from Begho ca 1000 to 1700 AD". In Akurang-Parry, Kwabena O.; Biveridge, Fritz (eds.). History, Culture and Heritage of Ghana: Essays in Honour of Professor Robert Addo-Fening. Yaoundé: Langaa RPCIG. pp. 165–200. ISBN 978-9956-553-68-6.
- Odotei, Irene K; Awedoba, A.K. (2006). Chieftaincy in Ghana: Culture, Governance and Development. Vol. 1. Sub-Saharan Publishers. ISBN 9789988550745.
- Posnansky, Merrick (2015). "Begho: Life and Times". Journal of West African History. 1 (2): 95–118. doi:10.14321/jwestafrihist.1.2.0095. JSTOR 10.14321/jwestafrihist.1.2.0095.
- Schneider, David M. (1974). Matrilineal kingship. University of California Press.
- Shillington, Kevin (2005). Encyclopedia of African History: A–G. Vol. 1. Taylor & Francis. ISBN 9781579582456.
- Warren, Dennis M. (1975). "Bono Royal Regalia". African Arts. 8 (2): 16–21. doi:10.2307/3334826. JSTOR 3334826.
- Warren, Dennis M. (1976). "The Use and Misuse of Ethnohistorical Data in the Reconstruction of Techiman-Bono (Ghana) History". Ethnohistory. 23 (4): 365–385. doi:10.2307/481652. JSTOR 481652.
