= Ahafo =

Ethnic group in Ghana

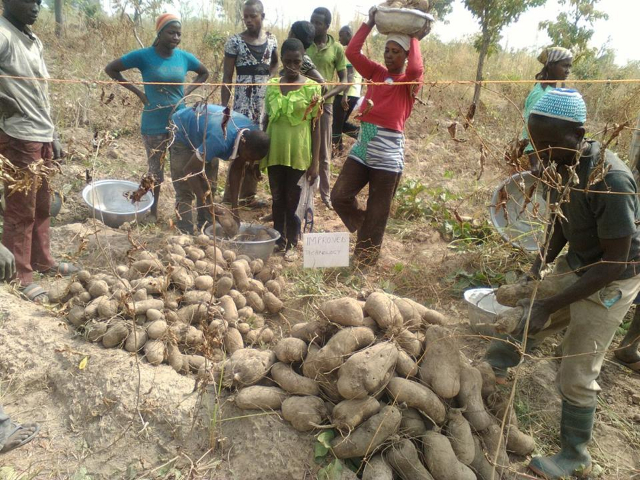
Ahafo yam farmers

Ahafo are Akan people who live in Ghana.
