= Mohamed Touré (footballer, born 1997) =

Ivorian footballer

Personal information
- Full name: Mohamed Cheick-Ali Touré
- Date of birth: 30 March 1997 (age 29)
- Place of birth: Abidjan, Ivory Coast
- Height: 1.79 m (5 ft 10 in)
- Position: Winger

Team information
- Current team: Trofense
- Number: 22

Youth career
- Aspire Academy

Senior career*
Years	Team	Apps	(Gls)
2016–2017	Cultural Leonesa	3	(0)
2017–2019	Oliveirense	48	(13)
2019–2020	Desportivo Aves	4	(0)
2020–2023	Canelas	66	(15)
2023–	Trofense	15	(3)
- * Club domestic league appearances and goals as of 26 June 2023

Mohamed Cheick-Ali Touré (born 30 March 1997), also known as Mozino, is an Ivorian professional footballer who plays as a winger for Portuguese club Trofense.

== Career ==
On 1 July 2019, Touré signed his first professional contract with Aves. He made his professional debut with Aves in a 1-0 Primeira Liga loss to Santa Clara on 4 January 2020.
