= Dyula people =

Ethnic group in West Africa

Dioula people
Total population
- 2.2 million

Regions with significant populations
- West Africa

Languages
- Dyula, French, English

Religion
- Predominantly Sunni Muslim

Related ethnic groups
- Mandinka, Bambara, Jakhanke

The Dyula (Dioula or Juula) or Wangara are a Mande ethnic group inhabiting several West African countries, including, Côte d'Ivoire, Ghana, and Burkina Faso.

Characterized as a highly successful merchant caste, Dyula migrants began establishing trading communities across the region in the fourteenth century. Since business was often conducted under non-Muslim rulers, the Dyula developed a set of theological principles for Muslim minorities in non-Muslim societies. Their unique contribution of long-distance commerce, Islamic scholarship and religious tolerance were significant factors in the peaceful expansion of Islam in West Africa.

The term 'Dyula' is sometimes used interchangeably with Wangara or Jakhanke, depending on the historical period and region.

== Historical background ==
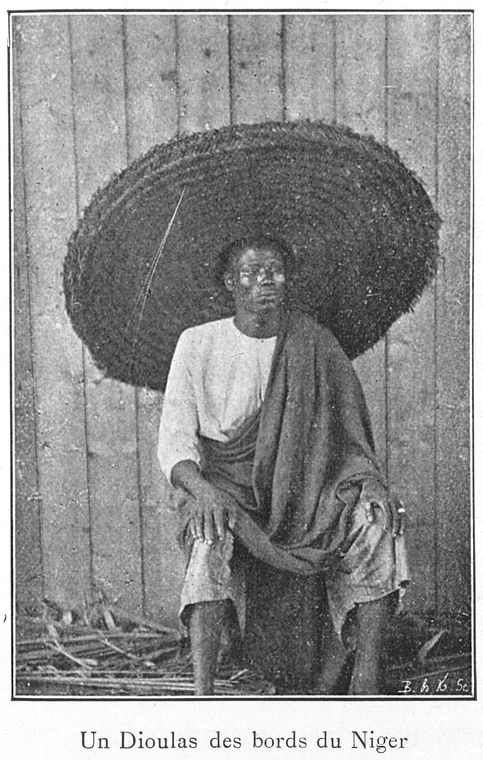
A Dyula man, 1900

The Mandé embraced Islam during the thirteenth century following introduction to the faith through contact with the North African traders. By the 14th century, the Malian empire (c. 1230–1600) had reached its apogee, acquiring a considerable reputation for the Islamic rulings of its court and the pilgrimages of several emperors who followed the tradition of Lahilatul Kalabi, the first black prince to make hajj to Mecca. It was at this time that Mali began encouraging some of its local merchants to establish colonies close to the gold fields of West Africa. This migrant trading class were known as Dyula, the Mandingo word for “merchant”.

The Dyula spread throughout the former area of Mandé culture from the Atlantic coast of Senegambia to the Niger and from the southern edge of the Sahara to forest zones further south. They established decentralized townships in non-Muslim colonies that were linked to an extensive commercial network, in what was described by professor Philip D. Curtin as a "trading diaspora". Motivated by business imperatives, they expanded into new markets, founding settlements under the auspices of various local rulers who often permitted them self-governance and autonomy. Organization of dyula trading companies was based on a clan-family structure known as the lu – a working unit consisting of a father and his sons and other attached males. Members of a given lu dispersed from the savanna to the forest, managed circulation of goods and information, placed orders, and effectively controlled the economic mechanisms of supply and demand.

=== Suwarian tradition ===
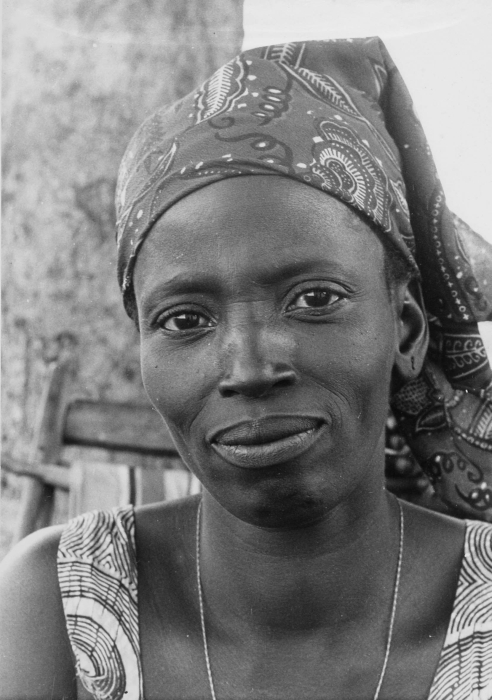
A Dyula farmer wearing a Dutch wax headscarf, 1966

Over time dyula colonies developed a theological rationale for their relations with non-Muslim ruling classes and subjects in what author Nehemia Levtzion dubbed "accommodationist Islam". The man credited with formulating this rationale is Sheikh Al-Hajj Salim Suwari, a Soninke cleric from the core Mali area who lived around 1500. He made hajj to Mecca several times and devoted his intellectual career to developing an understanding of the faith that would assist Muslim minorities in "pagan" lands. He drew on North African and Middle Eastern jurists and theologians who had reflected on the problem of Muslims living among non-Muslim majorities, situations that were frequent in the centuries of Islamic expansion.

Sheikh Suwari formulated the obligations of Muslim minorities in West Africa into something known as the Suwarian tradition. It stressed the need for Muslims to coexist peaceably with unbelievers and so justified a separation of religion and politics. In this understanding, Muslims must nurture their own learning and piety and thereby furnish good examples to the non-Muslims around them. They could accept jurisdiction of non-Muslim authorities as long as they had the necessary protection and conditions to practice the faith. In this teaching, Suwari followed a strong predilection in Islamic thought for any government, even if non-Muslim or tyrannical, as opposed to none. The military jihad was a resort only if the faithful were threatened. Suwari discouraged dawah (missionary activity), instead contending that God would bring non-Muslims to Islam in his own way; it was not a Muslim's responsibility to decide when ignorance should give way to belief. Since their Islamic practice was capable of accommodating traditional religions, dyula often served as priests, soothsayers, and counselors at the courts of animist rulers.

== Commercial and political expansion ==
As fellow Muslims, dyula merchants were also able to assess the valuable trans-Saharan trade network conducted by North African Arabs and Berbers whom they met at commercial centers across the Sahel. Some important trade goods included gold, millet, slaves, and kola nuts from the south and slave beads and cowrie shells from the north (for use as currency). It was under Mali that the great cities of the Niger bend including Gao and Djenné prospered, with Timbuktu in particular becoming known across Europe for its great wealth. Important trading centers in Southern West Africa developed at the transitional zone between the forest and the savanna; examples include Begho and Bono Manso (in present-day Ghana) and Bondoukou (in present-day Côte d'Ivoire). Western trade routes continued to be important, with Ouadane, Oualata and Chinguetti being the major trade centres in what is now Mauritania.

=== Penetration into southern forest regions ===
The development of Dyula trade in Ghana and the adjacent Ivory Coast had important political consequences and sometimes military implications as well. The dyula spearheaded Mande penetration of the forested zones in the south by establishing caravan routes and trading posts at strategic locations throughout the region en route to cola-producing areas. By the start of the sixteenth century, dyula merchants were trading as far south as the coast of modern Ghana.

On the forest's northern fringes, new states emerged, such as Bono and Banda. As the economic value of gold and kola became appreciated, forests south of these states which had hitherto been little inhabited because of limited agricultural potential became more thickly populated, and the same principles of political and military mobilization began being applied there. Village communities became tributaries of ruling groups, with some members becoming the clients and slaves needed to support royal households, armies, and trading enterprises. Sometimes these political changes were not to the advantage of the Dyula, who employed Mande warriors to guard their caravans and if necessary could call in larger contingents from the Sudanic kingdoms. In the seventeenth century, tensions between the Muslims and the local pagans in Begho erupted into a destructive war which eventually led to the total abandonment of the Banda capital. The local people eventually settled in a number of towns further east, while the dyula withdrew to the west to the further side of the Banda hills where they established the new trading center of Bonduku.

=== Gonja state ===
The dyula presence and changes in the balance of power occasioned political upheavals in other places. Among the paramount Mande political initiatives along trade routes south of Jenne was creation of the dyula state of Gonja by Naba'a in the 16th century. This was motivated by a general worsening of the competitive position of dyula traders and was occasioned by three factors: (1) a near-monopoly control in exporting forest produce achieved by the Akan kingdom of Bono; (2) the rise to power further north of the Dagomba Kingdom which controlled local salt pans; and (3) increased competition following the arrival in the region of rival long-distance traders from Hausaland.

The reaction of the Dyula in the Bono-Banda-Gonja region to these developments was to establish a kingdom of their own in Gonja – the territory northern traders had to cross to reach Akan forestlands, situated in what is now modern Ghana. By 1675, Gonja had established a paramount chief called Yagbongwura to control the kingdom. But Gonja was not a fruitful land in which to try to maintain a centralized government. This is because the Dagomba power to the north and Akan power to the south were too powerful; thus, the new kingdom rapidly declined in strength.

=== Kong Empire ===
Many of the trading posts established by the Dyula eventually became market villages or cities, such as Kong in today's Northeastern Côte d'Ivoire. It emerged as a commercial center when Malian merchants began trading in the territory which was inhabited by pagan Senufo and other Voltaic groups. The sous-préfecture of Kong, in the area of Kong to Dabakala, is said to be the “origin” area, where dyula traders first settled in the twelfth century. Dyula presence in the Kong area grew rapidly in the seventeenth century as a result of the developing trade between the commercial centers along the Niger banks and the forest region to the south which was controlled by the Baule chiefdoms and the Ashanti. The dyula brought their trading skills and connections and transformed Kong into an international market for the exchange of northern desert goods, such as salt and cloth, and southern forest exports, such as cola nuts, gold, and slaves. The city was also a religious center that housed a substantial academic community of Muslim scholars, with palaces and mosques built in the traditional Sudanese style. As Kong grew prosperous, its early rulers from the Taraweré clan combined dyula and Senufo traditions and extended their authority over the surrounding region.

By the eighteenth century the dyula had become quite powerful in the area and wished to rid themselves of subordination to Senufo chiefs. This was achieved in an uprising led by Seku Wattara (Ouattara), a dyula warrior who claimed descent from the Malinke Keita lineage and who had studied the Quran and engaged in commerce before becoming a warrior. By rallying around himself all dyula in the area, Seku Wattara easily defeated local chiefdoms and set up an independent Dyula state in 1710, the first of its kind in West Africa. He established himself as ruler and under his authority, the city rose from a small city-state to the capital of the great Kong Empire, holding sway over much of the region. The dyula of Kong also maintained commercial links with European traders on the Atlantic coast around the Gulf of Guinea, from whom they easily obtained prized European goods, most notably rifles, gunpowder, and textiles. The acquisition of weapons allowed for the creation of an armed militia force that protected trade routes passing through the territories of various minor rulers. In the course of developing his state, Seku Wattara built a strong army composed mostly of defeated pagan groups. The leadership of the army eventually developed into a new warrior class, called sonangi, which was gradually separated from the overall dyula merchant class.

The Kong Empire started to decline after the death of Seku Wattara. Succession struggles divided the kingdom into two parts, with the northern area being controlled by Seku's brother Famagan who refused to recognize the rule of Seku's oldest son in the south. Towards the end of the nineteenth century, many of Kong's provinces had formed independent chiefdoms. The city of Kong retained the prestige of an Islamic commercial center, but it was no longer the seat of an important political power. It eventually came under French colonial control in 1898. Despite the fall from glory, the seventeenth-century Kong Friday Mosque survived, and the city was largely rebuilt in a traditional Sudano-Sahelian architectural style and features a Qur'anic school.

=== Samory Toure ===
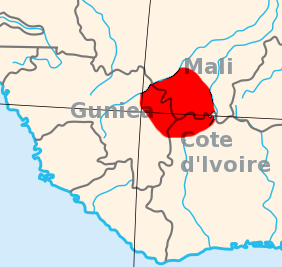
The Wassoulou Region of West Africa

The Mande conquerors of the nineteenth century frequently utilized trade routes established by the Dyula. Indeed, it was his exploitation of their commercial network that allowed military leader Samory Touré (1830–1900) to rise to a dominant position in the Upper Niger region. A member of a dyula family from Sanankoro in Guinea, Samori conquered and united Dyula states during the 1860s. He gained control over the Milo River Valley in 1871, seized the town of Kankan in 1881, and became the principal power holder on the Upper Niger. By 1883, Samori had successfully brought the local chieftains under his control and officially founded his empire.

He adopted the religious title of Almami in 1884. The new state was governed by Samori and a council of kinsmen and clients who took on the management of the chancery and the treasury, and administered justice, religious affairs, and foreign relations. Unlike some of his contemporary state-builders, Samori was not a religious preacher, and his state, sometimes incorrectly called 'Wassoulou' was not a reformist state as such. Nevertheless, he used Islam to unify the nation, promoting Islamic education and basing his rule on shari’a (Islamic law). However, Samori's professional army was the essential institution and the real strength behind his empire. He imported horses and weapons and modernized the army along European lines.

Dyula traders had never enjoyed as much prosperity as they did under the almamy. Even though they did not play a central part in the creation of the state, the dyula supported Samori because he actively encouraged commerce and protected trade routes, thus promoting a free circulation of people and goods. Samori put up the strongest resistance to European colonial penetration in West Africa, fighting both the French and British for seventeen years. Samori's would-be Muslim empire was undone by the French, who took Sikasso in 1898, and sent Samori into exile, where he died in 1900.

== Dyula culture and society ==
Dyula society is hierarchical or caste-based, with nobility and vassals. Like numerous other African peoples, they previously held slaves (jonw), who were often war prisoners from lands surrounding their territory. Descendants of former kings and generals had a higher status than their nomadic and more settled compatriots. With time, that difference has eroded, corresponding to the economic fortunes of the groups.

The traditional dyula social structure is further organized into various familial clan groups, and clan affiliation continues to be a dominant aspect of both collective and individual identity. People are fiercely loyal to their clan lineage, often expressing their cultural history and devotion through the oral traditions of dance and storytelling. The dyula are patrilineal and patriarchal, with older males possessing the most power and influence. Men and women commonly reside in separate houses made of mud or cement - men occupying roundhouses and women in rectangular ones. The father heads the family, and inheritances are passed down from fathers to their sons. Despite being illegal, the dyula still practice polygamy, and young people are often encouraged to marry within their own clan.

Another hereditary class that was afforded a particularly important status by the dyula social hierarchy was occupied by the tuntigi or warrior class. The dyula had long been accustomed to surrounding their cities with fortifications and taking up arms when it was deemed necessary in order to defend themselves and maintain the smooth flow of trade caravans. As a result, they became closely associated with the tuntigi warriors.

== Islamic tradition ==
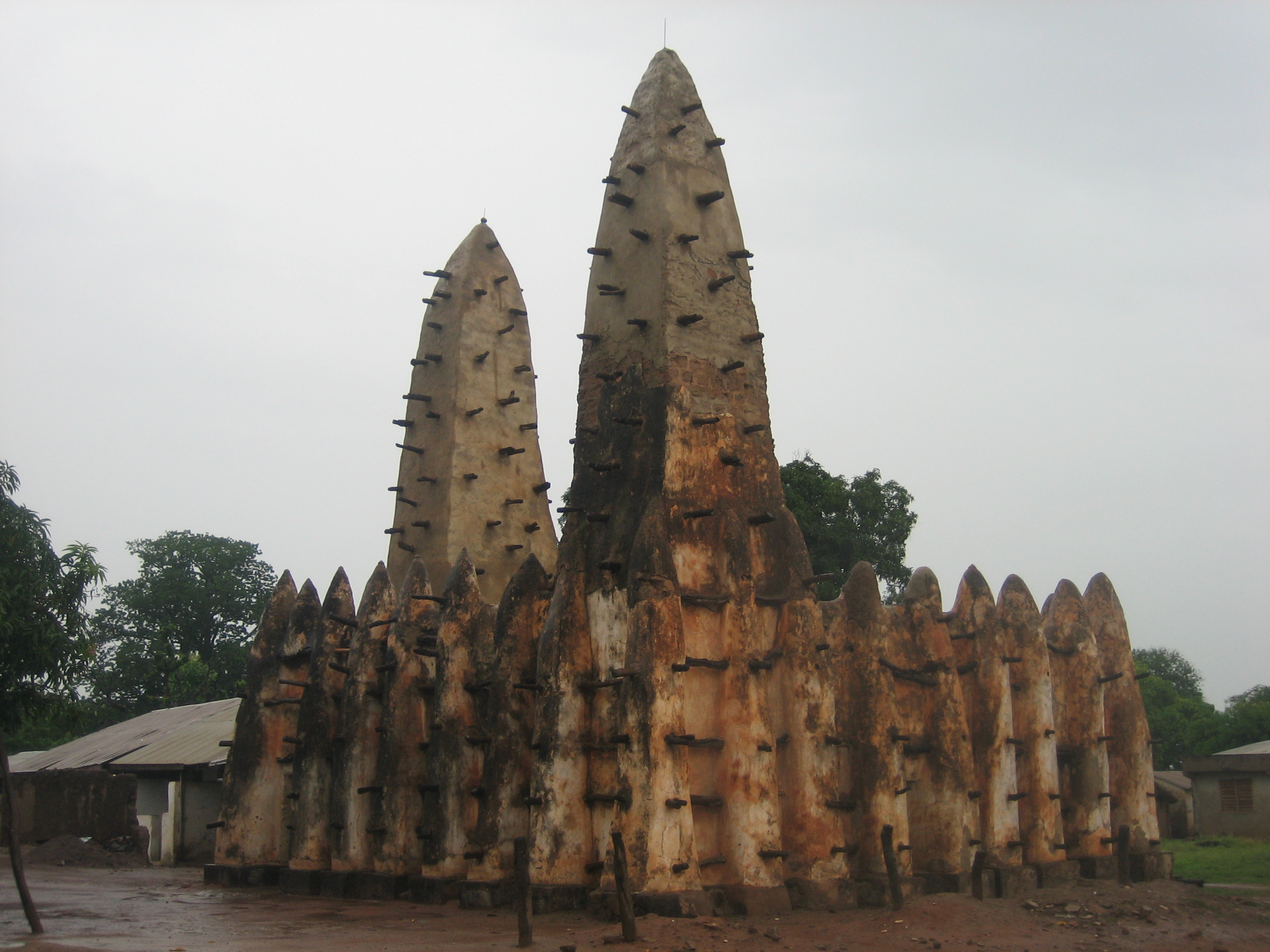
Mosque in Ghana

The dyula have been predominantly Muslim since the 13th century. Many in rural areas combine Islamic beliefs with certain pre-Islamic animistic traditions such as the presence of spirits and use of amulets. Dyula communities have a reputation for historically maintaining a high standard of Muslim education. The dyula family enterprise based on the lu could afford to provide some of its younger men an Islamic education. Thus, an ulema (clerical) class known as karamogo emerged, who were educated in the Quran and commentary (tafsir), hadith (prophetic narrations), and the life of Muhammad. According to the dyula clerical tradition, a student received instruction under a single sheikh for a duration varying from five to thirty years, and earned his living as a part-time farmer working his teacher's lands. After he completed his studies, a karamogo obtained a turban and an isnad (teaching license), and either sought further instruction or started his own school in a remote village. A highly educated karamogo could become a professional imam or qadi (judge).

Certain families gained a reputation for providing multiple generations of scholars. For example, the Saghanughu clan was a dyula lineage living in Northern and Western Ivory Coast and parts of the Upper Volta. This lineage may be traced to Timbuktu, but its principal figure was Sheikh Muhammad al-Mustafa Saghanughu (died 1776), the imam of Bobo-Dyulasso. He produced an educational system based on three canonical texts of Quranic commentary (tafsir) and hadith. His sons continued spreading their father's teachings and expanded through towns in Ghana and the Ivory Coast, founding Islamic schools, or madaris, and acting as imams and qadis.

These madaris were probably a positive byproduct of the long history of Muslims' interest in literary work. In The Islamic Literary Tradition in Ghana, author Thomas Hodgkin enumerates the large literary contribution that was made by Dyula-Wangara Muslims to the history of not only the regions they found themselves in but also of West Africa as a whole. He cites al-Hajj Osmanu Eshaka Boyo of Kintampo as an "‘alim with a wide range of Muslim connexions and an excellent grasp of local Islamic history" whose efforts brought together a great many Arabic manuscripts from around Ghana. These manuscripts, the Isnad al-shuyukh wa’l-ulama, or Kitab Ghunja, compiled by al-Hajj ‘Umar ibn Abi Bakr ibn ‘Uthman al-Kabbawi al-Kanawi al-Salaghawi of Kete-Krachi whom Hodgkin describes as "the most interesting, and historically significant of the poets", may now be found in the library of the Institute of African Studies of the University of Ghana.

== Dioula language ==
The dyula speak the Dioula language or Julakan, which is included in the group of closely interrelated Manding languages that are spoken by various ethnic groups spread across Western Africa. Dioula is most closely related to the Bambara language (the most widely spoken language in Mali), in a manner similar to the relation between American English and British English. It is probably the most used language for trade in West Africa.

The Dioula language and people are distinct from the Diola (Jola) people of Guinea-Bissau and Casamance.

== Notable Dyula people ==
- Alpha Blondy
- Amadou Touré
- Amadou Ouattara, footballer
- Christian Manfredini
- Cyrille Bayala
- Issouf Ouattara
- Kalpi Ouattara
- Mohamed Ouattara
- Modibo Sagnan
- Mohamed Touré
- Kolo Touré, Ivorian footballer
- Yaya Touré, Ivorian footballer
- Seku Ouattara (Wattara) – a dioula warrior and founder of the Kong Empire
- Alassane Ouattara, president of Ivory Coast (Côte d'Ivoire) since 2010
- Vincent Angban
- Yacouba Songné
