= Bono Manso =

Town in Bono East Region, Ghana

Manso Maaso (Akan)
- Village
- Location of Manso in Bono East Region, Ghana
- Coordinates: 7°42′04″N 1°50′46″W
- Country: Ghana
- Region: Bono East Region
- Founded: c. 1000

Population
  - Ethnicities: Akan; Bono
- Time zone: GMT
  - Summer (DST): GMT
- Climate: Aw

Manso or Maaso, often referred to as Bono-Manso in historical contexts, was an urban centre of significant religious, political, and economic influence. It was situated in the northern forest savanna zone of Akan realm. Founded c. 1000 CE, it was the capital of the Bono state from the 11th century to 1723. Bono Manso flourished into a prominent and cosmopolitan centre of trade to the Bono state, attracting Muslim Juula from the Mali Empire and several merchants across North and West Africa. According to oral traditions, merchants brought textiles, salt, and brass which they traded there for gold, kola, and slaves.

Just like its twin-counterpart Begho, Bono Manso had a huge market called Dwabirem in the southwest direction, linking the sub-Saharan and ultimately European long distance trade. After the Asante destroyed Bono Manso in 1723, Techiman succeeded it. Presently, Bono Manso is a village north of Techiman in Ghana.

== History ==
Archaeologists date the founding of Bono Manso to c. 1000 CE, although both local traditions and archaeological data show that the town's inhabitants were descendants of the proto-Akan who occupied the nearby rock shelters some 600 years earlier. The town had developed into a commercial and ritual center by the 14th and 15th centuries, at which point the state of Bonoman had developed, the earliest of the Akan states. The town was a key node in the Trans-Saharan trade network, linking the Akan goldfields with northern markets such as Djenné and Timbuktu. Goods traded through Bono-Manso included gold, kola nuts, salt, leather, and cloth.

Bono-Manso was destroyed in 1723 by Opoku Ware I of the Asante Empire. A rump state survived in Techiman, which remained a vassal of the Asante until the late 19th century.

Bono-Manso may have played a role in the local slave trade, but in recent decades the village has been marketed as the site of a massive slave market in order to attract tourists. No evidence exists that Bono-Manso ever served as such, particularly for enslaved persons fated to enter the Atlantic Slave Trade.

== See also ==
- Bono people
- Bono State
- Old Wenchi
- Old Banda
- Begho
- Gyaman

== Sources ==
- Arhin, Kwame (1979). A Profile of Brong Kyempim: Essays on the Archaeology, History, Language and Politics of the Brong Peoples of Ghana. Monograph. Institute of Development Studies and Partner Organisations.
- Compton, Anne M. (2017). Excavations at Kranka Dada: An Examination of Daily Life, Trade, and Ritual in the Bono Manso Region. BAR International Series. Vol. 2857. BAR Publishing. ISBN 9781407315843.
- Effah-Gyamfi, E. (1974). "Aspects of the Archaeology and Traditions of the Bono State". Transactions of the Historical Society of Ghana. 15 (2): 217–227.
- Konadu, Kwasi (2010). The Akan Diaspora in the Americas. Oxford: Oxford University Press. doi:10.1093/acprof:oso/9780195390643.001.0001. ISBN 9780195390643.
