= Kwasi Konadu =

Jamaican author and scholar

- Born: June 1, 1975 (age 51); Jamaica, West Indies
- Education: Cornell University - Master's degree, African and African Diaspora History (1997–1999); Ph.D. Howard University - African History, African Diaspora Studies
- Occupations: Educator, professor, writer
- Website: kwasikonadu.info

Kwasi Konadu is a Jamaican scholar, educator, writer, editor, and historian. He is the author of several books, among them The Akan Diaspora in the Americas (2010), The Ghana Reader: History, Culture, Politics (with Clifford C. Campbell, 2016), Our Own Way in This Part of the World: Biography of an African Community, Culture, and Nation (2019) and Many Black Women of this Fortress (2022).

== Biography ==
Kwasi Konadu is a scholar of Africa and African Diaspora. He was the John D. and Catherine T. MacArthur Endowed Chair and Professor at Colgate University, where he taught courses in African history and on worldwide African histories and cultures. With extensive archival and field research in West Africa, Europe, Brazil, the Caribbean, and North America, his writings focus on African and African diasporic histories, as well as major themes in world history. He is the author of Our Own Way in This Part of the World: Biography of an African Community, Culture, and Nation (Duke University Press, 2019), (with Clifford C. Campbell) The Ghana Reader: History, Culture, Politics (Duke University Press, 2016), Transatlantic Africa, 1440–1888 (Oxford University Press, 2014), The Akan Diaspora in the Americas (Oxford University Press, 2010), among other books. He is a publisher of scholarly books about African world histories and cultures through Diasporic Africa Press.

Konadu is a healer (Tanɔ ɔbosomfoɔ), having studied with his grandfather in Jamaica and then in Takyiman (central Ghana).

He is a husband and a father.

== Books ==
- 2004: Truth Crushed to the Earth Will Rise Again!: The East Organization and the Principles and Practice of Nationalist Development.
- 2007: Indigenous Medicine and Knowledge in African Society A study of indigenous medical knowledge systems in Africa and the African Diaspora (Routledge).
- 2009: View From The East: Black Cultural Nationalism and Education in New York City (Syracuse University Press). The East was a cultural and educational centre for people of African descent. It was founded by African-American educators and progressive activists during the Black Power Movement. The organization was based in Brooklyn, but its influence was throughout New York City, the United States, the Caribbean, Africa, and Asia. This edition expands research using additional archival information from the first edition.
- 2010: The Akan Diaspora in the Americas (Oxford University Press). Konadu documents and demonstrates contributions of the Akan cultural group from West Africa. He examines their experiences in Guyana, Jamaica, Antigua, Barbados, and in North America.
- 2013: The Akan People: A Documentary History (Markus Wiener Publishers).
- 2014: Transatlantic Africa: 1440–1888 (Oxford University Press). In this book, Konadu gives an African-centric interpretation of the Atlantic slave trade. The source material he uses comes from oral histories and traditions, and written documents. He examines African societies and their viewpoint.
- 2015: Akan Peoples: In Africa and the Diaspora - A Historical Reader (Markus Wiener Publishers). This book is a collection of essays about the Akan people of West Africa. They are an ethnic group that exist in West Africa and the Africa Diaspora. The collection of essays are about their, history, culture, in Africa, and their presence among the African Diaspora.
- 2016: The Ghana Reader: History, Culture, Politics (The World Readers), (Duke University Press, 2016), with Clifford C. Campbell. In this book, Konadu and Campbell cover 500 years of Ghana's history. The book provides many perspectives about Ghana: historical, political, and cultural. The book discusses the Asante Kingdom (the Gold Coast), and its relationship to European commerce and the transatlantic slave trade. The reader has selections from farmers, traders, clergy, intellectuals, politicians, musicians, and foreign travellers. Konadu's source material comes from historical documents, poems, treaties, articles, and fiction. It conveys Ghana's intersecting histories, its contribution to the African Diaspora, its development as a nation, democracy and its significance in the 21st century.
- 2018: Akan Pioneers: African Histories, Diasporic Experiences (Diasporic Africa Press)
- 2019: Our Own Way in This Part of the World: Biography of an African Community, Culture, and Nation (Duke University Press)
- 2022: Many Black Women of this Fortress: Graça, Mónica and Adwoa, Three Enslaved Women of Portugal's African Empire (Hurst Publishers).
