= Bono State =

Pre-colonial Akan polity in modern day Ghana

Bono State Bonoman (Abron)
- 11th–13th century–1723
- Status: Former kingdom
- Capital and largest city: Bono Manso
- Common languages: Bono Twi
- Religion: Bono ancestral religion; ancestor veneration; earth deity worship
- Demonym: Bono
- Government: Monarchy
- Bonohene
  - Pre-11th century: Nana Asaman (Ancestry and traditional founder)
  - d. 1723: Ameyaw Kwakye I (Last independent Bonohene)
- Legislature: Council of Chiefs (Amanhene)
- Historical era: Precolonial West Africa
  - Early occupation of Amowi I: c. 440 CE
  - Established: 11th–13th century
  - Consolidation of power through formation of early Bono towns under local chiefs: 11th–13th centuries
  - Territorial expansion under Ameyaw and Obunumankoma: 14th–16th centuries
  - Extensive northern trade; adoption of horses, brassware, and northern textiles: 16th–17th centuries
  - Internal unrest, dynastic conflict, and political decline preceding the Asante conquest: Late 17th century
  - Conquest by the Asante Empire: 1723
- Currency: Gold dust; Cowry shells (minor); iron bars (trade)
Succeeded by
Techiman
- Today part of: Ghana

- People: Bonofoɔ
- Language: Bono Twi
- Country: Bonoman

The Bono State (or Bonoman) was an early Akan state in what is now the Bono Region of Ghana. Bono traditions trace its origins to Amowi near modern day Nkoranza. From Amowi, the early settlers moved to Yɛfri and later to Bono Manso, which became the capital.

The state traded gold, kola, and other forest products through Begho for goods brought from the north. Bono expanded by bringing surrounding settlements under its rule, but began to decline during the 17th century. The Asante Empire conquered state in 1722–1723 and Bono royal line was later re-established at Takyiman under Asante rule.

== Etymology ==
Bonoman combines Bono with ɔman ("nation" or "state") and means "the Bono nation" or "land of the Bono." Effah-Gyamfi identified the Bonnoe shown on a Dutch map of 1629 with the Bono state and noted that Bono Manso means "the seat of the Bono state." He considered the name "Bono Manso State" repetitive and used Bono for the state itself.

Takyiman oral tradition gives two explanations for the name Bono. In one, the name means a "pioneer" or something that is first of its kind and is connected with the Akan expression abɔnɔwo, used when a woman gives birth for the first time. Takyiman traditions regard Bono as one of the earliest Akan states and its people as the first organized population to settle in the present Brong-Ahafo region. They hold that Asante, Denkyira, and Gyaman developed afterward, while Berekum, Dormaa, and Nkoranza were established later and adopted the Bono dialect. The other explanation derives the name from boɔ or boo, which can refer to a hole, cave, or rock shelter. In this tradition, the name comes from the belief that the ancestors of the Bono emerged from a hole at Amowi.

== History ==
=== Origins ===
Takyiman tradition traces the ancestors of the Bono to Amowi, a sacred hole near a rock shelter about two kilometres southeast of Pinihi in the modern Nkoranza area. The site had been inhabited since at least the 5th century CE. According to the tradition, the ancestors of the Bono state emerged from the hole on a Friday. Their emergence from Amowi is remembered in songs performed during the annual Apɔɔ festival at Takyiman. The tradition states that an early king disappeared back into the hole after being startled by a hunter and left a large necklace at its entrance. Queen Ameyaa then led the people to a settlement about one kilometre from Amowi with their deity Biakru. Her son became ruler and was given the name Asaman, meaning "spirit of the dead", because the former king was believed to remain in the spirit world. Families soon established settlements under their own family heads throughout the surrounding area.

Another account records a movement from Amowi to Yɛfri (Yefri) and later to Manso. Asaman sent hunters to search for a site for a new capital. He and part of the population later moved about seventeen kilometres from the earlier settlement, while the priest of Biakru and some inhabitants remained behind to guard the sacred hole. The new settlement became Bono Manso, the capital of the Bono state. Takyiman tradition also recognizes the Gyamma as earlier inhabitants of the area. Asaman's hunters were said to have found their ancestors living in caves while searching for the site of the new capital. The Gyamma cared for the Bono stool while Manso was being built. As the town grew, they were later absorbed into the larger Bono population. During the Takyiman yam festival, the chief of Gyamma presented the first yams to the Omanhene of Takyiman, a custom that recognized the Gyamma as the hosts of the Takyiman people. Sites associated with Gyamma traditions were also found about eighteen kilometres south of Bono Manso. Gyamma elders regarded a group of inselbergs there as the homes of their earliest ancestors. Archaeological remains from the sites included material associated with the Kintampo tradition, which had been dated to around 1500–1100 BC.

=== State formation and consolidation ===
Bono developed by bringing older settlements and communities around Bono Manso into the state through intermarriage and political ties rather than military conquest. Settlements had different origins. Some were associated with caves and rock shelters, while others began as royal settlements, migrant communities, trading or farming settlements, hunting camps, or settlements founded on the instructions of deities. Akumadan was a hunting settlement, its name derived from the hunter Ankoma and nnan (camp), while Besedan developed as a kola-growing settlement associated with dependents of a Bono queen. Some communities were already established before they became part of Bono. Dewoman had also existed as a separate state before its ruler became subordinate to the Bono king and was sometimes referred to as his "son."

Chiefs who became part of Bono remained in their own settlements while attending the royal court at Bono Manso. Many chiefs and members of the royal court established settlements within about 15 kilometres of the capital and maintained houses there for festivals and other visits. It allowed them to govern surrounding villages while being close enough to be summoned by the king. Some wing chiefs controlled ten or more villages. One early sub-chief, Takyi Firi, lived at Nkwakuru and also ruled Baafi and Takyiman. As the settlements were brought together, Bono Manso became the political center of the state and the surrounding chiefs formed a hierarchy under the Bono king. The ruler came to be known as "Bono Kyempim Duoduakwa Hene mu Hene", translated as "King of the countless Bono who were planted everywhere" or "king of kings."

=== Growth and expansion ===
According to Adu Boahen, Bono developed from the need to protect and regulate gold production and the trade routes between the forest and the Middle Niger. Effah-Gyamfi also connected the wealth of the state with its location and natural resources. The area produced yams, sorghum, kola, and other forest and savanna products and also contained gold deposits. Its position near the northern edge of the forest placed Bono at the southern end of the northwestern trade route from the Middle Niger. Northern traders using horses and donkeys generally stopped there because their animals could not travel far into the forest. Bono traders could therefore exchange local gold, kola, and other forest products with merchants arriving from the north. The nearby town of Begho, also known as Nsɔkɔ, became a trading center where gold, kola, ivory, and other forest products were exchanged for textiles, salt, and metal goods brought by Wangara merchants.

The rulers Ameyaw and Obunumankoma expanded Bonoman during the second half of the 15th century. By the 16th and 17th centuries, Bono Manso had become a major center of trade and craft production. Trade and craft production remained in the hands of Bono elites, and the population was mostly Akan. Oral traditions remember long periods of peace, with disputes (akokoakoko) consisting mainly of family quarrels and secessions rather than large wars. Until the 17th century, Bono remained the main power in the area, and Dewoman and Nyafoman owed allegiance to its king. Other traditions record wars with neighboring states, such as the Gonja kingdom.

=== Decline ===
Bonoman began to decline during the 17th century when drought, dynastic disputes, and changes in trade affected the state. At the same time, southern Akan states such as Akyem and Denkyira, and later the Asante Empire, gained greater access to coastal trade and European firearms. Bono remained inland and lost its earlier importance in regional trade. High taxation and succession disputes also weakened the state. Oral traditions describe growing opposition to Ameyaw Kwakye I, the last Bonohene, who was accused of neglecting ritual duties and raising taxes. Before the Asante invasion, some of his subjects refused to defend the capital, saying, "Se hene Ameyaw anya ne ko a onko nhye" ("If king Ameyaw has got his war, let him fight it all").

=== Akan migrations and Asante expansion into Bono ===
Before the rise of the Asante Empire, Akan-speaking groups from Adanse and the Kumasi area had already moved north into the region around Bono. Most arrived as settlers or refugees rather than conquerors and often joined existing villages and towns instead of founding separate settlements. Some settled in the area that later became Nkoranza, while others moved farther northwest toward Bondoukou. Nkoranza traditions traced some of the earlier settlers to the Asene clan of Adanse. One branch moved from Ayaase in Adanse to the Kumasi area, where they founded Amakom. During the growth of Asante, Amakom came into conflict with the Oyoko rulers of Kumasi. Its chief, Akosa Yiadom, was killed at Swedru by pursuing Asante forces, and some of the inhabitants fled north to Nkoranza. Traditions from Nkoranza and Takyiman state that Baffo and his followers from Amakom joined three hunters who already had nnan (hunting camps) at the site of Nkoranza and supplied meat to the Bono king. The immigrant population later became larger than the earlier population there.

The migrants later moved in search of new lands under Adu Denyina and another warrior also named Adu. Denyina settled at Swedru and was succeeded by his sister's son, Baffo Pim. Longoro-Nkwanta, inhabited mainly by Mo people, was one of the few settlements in the Bono area associated with migration for better land or escape from political disputes. Asante military campaigns caused more Akan movement into the northwest. During the reigns of Obiri Yeboa and Osei Tutu, fighting around Kumasi displaced Dormaa and other groups. Dormaa refugees moved north and established themselves near Sunyani before continuing toward Wam and Bondoukou, where Dormaa lineages later became associated with the Abron kingdom of Gyaman. Goody did not consider the earlier Akan movement into Nkoranza, Abron, and other parts of the northwest as an Asante invasion. He described the migrants as settlers and refugees whose presence later made Asante expansion into the region easier. Asante forces pursued the Dormaa northward and attacked Wenchi during the same period. The date of the defeat of Wenchi is uncertain. One tradition placed it during the reign of Opoku Ware, while another placed it under Obiri Yeboa. Goody suggested that Wenchi had already been defeated or immobilized before the main attacks on Takyiman and Abron (Gyaman). Asante was in a stronger position around Bono and from Wenchi, Nsawkaw could be neutralized and Nchira kept out of the coming war. Akan settlers already living in Nkoranza and other parts of the northwest assisted the Asante advance. Goody regarded their support as part of a larger strategy that included earlier wars, diplomacy, and the isolation of Takyiman. By the time Bono was attacked, the state had been deprived of several of its former allies.

=== Asante conquest of Bono ===
Asante invaded Bono in 1722–1723. A Dutch West India Company letter from 1724 reported that "the Ashantees who have again won a very big battle against a district that lie behind them and was quite 3 times stronger than the Ashantees. It was done thro' treachery, and was at once ruined. Much booty was plundered by the Ashantees much of this they will bring to Elmina to sell which will give a considerable trade." The Kitab Ghunja recorded "Bawo's (Baffo Pim) attack on Takyiman" in 1722/23. According to a tradition recorded by Goody, Baffo Pim persuaded the ruler of Bono to send gold to the Asantehene as a peace offering. The Asantehene took the gift as evidence that Takyiman had enough wealth to prepare for war. At the time of the invasion, Nsawkaw had been neutralized and most of the settlements that later formed Nkoranza cooperated with Asante. Nchira stayed out of the fighting and provided medical help to wounded Asante soldiers. Abron and Banda also took no active part in the war, while central Gonja fought on the side of Takyiman. Nkoranza traditions credited Baffo Pim with defeating Nyafoman and taking Diuman, Pianyinu, Droman, and other settlements under Takyiman. Goody placed these conquests during or after the Asante invasion rather than before it. Bono was defeated in 1723 and lost its independence. According to Takyiman traditions, the Bono king and queen were captured and taken to Kumasi. Court craftsmen were also moved there and continued producing gold and other ornaments for the Asante kings. Stories from Takyiman further claim that Bono weaving and brass-casting were introduced into Asante after the conquest.

=== Bono under Asante rule ===
The conquest reduced the territory controlled by the Bono royal line. According to Effah-Gyamfi, more than two-thirds of the former Bono territory was incorporated into Nkoranza, with Baffo Pim as its first king. Bono Manso itself became part of Nkoranza while Takyiman, which had previously been a small settlement founded by one of the Bono sub-chiefs, became the new capital of the old Bono royal line. The royal line had been re-established there under Asante rule by 1740 and was required to pay annual tribute to Asante. Later Takyiman rulers made several attempts to recover the territory lost after the conquest, but they had little success. Other Bono groups dispersed after the conquest, with refugees moving northwest into Gyaman and others settling in Dormaa, Nkoranza, and Berekum. Asante controlled the conquered northwest through existing rulers rather than replacing them with rulers from Kumasi. Tribute was collected from the conquered states, while local representatives, toll collectors, oath servers, and officials connected with the Asante court maintained relations with Kumasi. Important lineages were also moved closer to political centers so that they could be closely watched.

== Divisions ==
At its height, Bono bordered Bonduku and Banda to the west, Gonja and Yendi to the north, Mampong and Offinso to the south, and Kete-Krakye to the east. Bono towns were mainly Akan, compared with the mixed trading communities at Begho and Wenchi. The capital was the seat of the king, a market center, and a religious center. Oral tradition remembers it as "the town with one hundred and seventy-seven streets". Bono settlements were divided into several levels. Manso referred to the capital, while -man was used for provincial capitals such as Takyiman, Amoman, and Dewoman, each remembered as having "seventy-seven streets." Smaller towns were called krom, including Kramokrom and Forikrom, while villages were known as nkuraa. Some had specific duties, such as Akyemhatae, which guarded the royal gold regalia while Besedan maintained the queen mother's kola groves, and Akyeremade, which housed the drummers of Dewoman.

=== Amowi Cave ===
Amowi Cave is the sacred site from which the ancestors of Bono are said to have emerged. The archaeological site, identified as Amuowi I, is located at 7°39′N, 1°43′W and has been radiocarbon dated to approximately AD 370–510. The rock shelter large enough for people to live in stands near the sacred hole, while a stream rises from a dark cave beside it. Effah-Gyamfi gave two possible explanations for the Amowi tradition. The first is that it may date from a time when people lived in caves or rock shelters during the Early Iron Age. He noted that bono or boo could refer to a hole, rock shelter, or cave. The second is that Amowi may have become a sacred place associated with the ancestors. He suggested that the rock shelter, cave, and stream may have contributed to the tradition.

In a later study, Effah-Gyamfi examined the archaeological evidence from Amowi. Excavations near the sacred hole recovered pottery and three grinding stones. No Kintampo material was found, but pottery from the earliest level was similar to pottery found at Bono Manso. A radiocarbon sample from the rock shelter was dated to the first millennium AD. Effah-Gyamfi also considered whether traditions of emergence from holes were later claims to ownership of the land. He noted that archaeological remains were found at or near several places named in the traditions and that the sites were generally near hills containing caves or rock shelters and streams. Amowi also continued to appear in Takyiman traditions and songs even though the site had been outside Takyiman control since the Asante conquest in 1723. Effah-Gyamfi suggested that some of these traditions may date from a period when people in the area still lived in caves or rock shelters, possibly during the Early Iron Age.

=== Bono Manso ===
Bono Manso (literally "great town of Bono") was the capital of Bonoman. Archaeological evidence shows that permanent settlements existed in the area before Bono Manso developed into a larger settlement. Evidence of iron smelting has been found at Abam, dating to about 300 CE, and at other sites in the area dating to the 6th century. It was located south of the Black Volta River on trade routes linking the Akan goldfields with Sahelian markets such as Djenné and Timbuktu. Gold, kola nuts, salt, leather, and cloth were traded there. The town was located near the Tano River, close to the southern limit of caravan travel, where tsetse flies prevented horses and other pack animals from travelling much farther south. According to Effah-Gyamfi, Bono Manso was settled by the 13th century and had become a center of trade and religious activity by the 14th and 15th centuries. Excavations at Amowi I, Amowi II, and Bono Manso recovered large amounts of pottery, more than 99 percent of which was locally made. Some pottery came from the Banda and Bole regions.

The town covered between 150 and 230 hectares and had an estimated population of about 5,000, based on architectural remains and settlement density. Oral tradition reported that the capital had 177 streets. Chiefs who lived elsewhere maintained houses in the capital for visits to the royal court, while craftsmen could also be brought there from subordinate settlements. The ahenfie (royal palace) was a walled complex divided into several courtyards and quarters, including pramaso (main courtyard), pramakan (first court), prama II (second court), mmam (harem), dabekan (bedroom), dabekyire (inner bedroom), and nkotimso (servants' quarters). Oral tradition also states that the king kept many slaves and attendants in the ahenfie. Several streams bordered the town. The Pankana stream lay to the north and west and provided most of its water, while the Abam stream lay to the east.

=== Kokuman ===
Kokuman was a province of the Bono state whose early population was associated with a rock-shelter settlement. The site was located at 7°49′N, 1°44′W and was one of three rock shelters that traditions connected with people who took part in the formation of Bono.

=== Nyafoman ===
Nyafoman was one of the provincial capitals under Bono and was subordinate to the Bono king. It was occupied between the 16th and 18th centuries. Nyafoman was also a center of blacksmithing. According to tradition, a Bono king ordered his son, the ruler of Nyafoman, to send 150 blacksmiths (atomfoo) to the royal court at Bono Manso, where they made tools and weapons under the leadership of Kwabena Kra.

=== Dewoman ===
Dewoman was one of the main chiefdoms under Bono and had its own political and religious center. The suffix -man in its name classified it as a chiefdom capital, like Takyiman and Amoman. Dewoman was also an important shrine center, where its ruler performed religious duties.

=== Amoman ===
Amoman was one of the provincial capitals of the Bono state. Effah-Gyamfi located it at 7°46′N, 1°53′W and dated the settlement to between the 16th and 18th centuries.

=== Besedan ===
Besedan was an agricultural settlement associated with a Bono queen and her dependents. Tradition held that it was founded mainly for the cultivation of kola, an important product in trade with Dyula merchants from the Middle Niger.

=== Akumadan ===
Akumadan, recorded by Effah-Gyamfi as Ankomadan, began as a hunters' camp. Hunting settlements were initially established where game or good farmland was available and later attracted people from the hunter's original settlement and other communities.

=== Asekye ===
Asekye was one of the settlements associated with the Bono state. Effah-Gyamfi placed it at 7°37′N, 1°44′W and dated its occupation to between the 13th and 16th centuries. Oral traditions remembered Asekye as one of the larger Bono settlements and claimed that it had 77 streets.

=== Kranka Dada ===
Kranka Dada was a small settlement northeast of Bono Manso, occupied from the late 13th century until the Asante conquest in 1723. Excavations carried out from 2009 to 2012 found the remains of houses and granaries, along with hearths and debris from ironworking. Finds included brass, glass beads, imported ceramics, and terracotta rasps, showing that goods from outside the area also reached the settlement. Kranka Dada was one of the smaller settlements around Bono Manso and provided the capital with food and labor. Oral traditions recorded in the area also mention shrine priestesses who remained there after the settlement was abandoned.

=== Kramokrom ===
Kramokrom was a settlement of Muslim traders about four kilometres west of Bono Manso. Its name was derived from Kramo, the Akan word for a Muslim, and krom, meaning settlement or town. According to local traditions, the traders were Muslims who remained separate from the capital so that they could practice their religion while trading with the local population. The settlement was dated between the 13th and 18th centuries.

=== Kagbrema ===
Kagbrema was a settlement associated with foreign traders and was occupied between the 13th and 18th centuries. Effah-Gyamfi explained that traditions did not clearly identify its inhabitants as immigrants, but its name and an ancient brass bowl associated with the settlement pointed to outside contacts. He compared its name with the Gberi or Kagbrema mentioned by Goody, whose descendants were later found in the Bole area.

== Government ==
=== Authority ===
Bono was ruled by the king with the help of his wing chiefs. The state stool, known as the puduo, was said to have been brought from Amowi. It was made of gold and kept in a box called seseg, which was opened only during ceremonies. During the Asante invasion, the stool was hidden in a cave near Buoyem, where it was later captured. The queen mother lived at Amoman, about eight kilometers north of Bono Manso. The royal burial place, known as Nnaaham, was also at Amoman, although some traditions place another nnaaham at the capital. The queen mother visited Bono Manso on special occasions, while the king travelled to Amoman to consult her. Bono traditions remember its kings differently. Some were regarded as peaceful rulers, while others were remembered for harsh rule. Ameyaw Akumfi I was said to have ordered entire households killed when one of their members angered him. His name Akumfi is said to come from the expression Ameyaw kum sifa yi, meaning "Ameyaw, killer of inmates."

Most settlements were within about 30 to 40 kilometers of the capital. Villages were ruled by wing chiefs or by "sons" of the king. The Koonahene or Kurontirehene ruled Nkwaakuru, Baafi, and Tanoboase, while the Atomfohene, chief of the blacksmiths, ruled Nyafoman. The chief priest of Dewoman ruled Dewoman, Dapaafu, Abolisae, and Asuokawkoma. The rulers of larger chiefdoms such as Nyafoman and Dewoman lived in their capitals. Rulers of smaller chiefdoms, including Asekye and Tiframu, regularly travelled to Bono Manso to report on affairs in their territories and attend council meetings. Royal sons living outside the capital also made regular visits. Horses were used to travel between Bono Manso and the surrounding settlements. They came from the north, including the Gonja area, and were also brought by Mande-speaking traders. Wing chiefs and members of the royal family rode them, and roads and bridges connected the capital with surrounding towns and the market at Dwabirim. The Apokosu stream near the capital was used for watering horses. Horses were used by chiefs and members of the royal family for travel and could also be used by commanders during war, but Bono did not have a large cavalry force. In times of war, their use was restricted to nobles and royals, who served as commanders of the army.

== Society ==
=== Social structure ===
According to Effah-Gyamfi, early Bono communities were organized by streets and quarters rather than matrilineal clans. He regarded this as an older form of social organization that existed before the abusua (clan) system. One old quarter at Bono Manso, associated with the Dwomoo clan, was still remembered in local traditions. In 1929, Rattray wrote that the Bono of Takyiman were "apparently wholly ignorant" of the Ashanti and Fante clan names. Instead of identifying themselves by the totemic clans found among the Asante and Fante, people identified themselves by the Abronno (streets or quarters) of their towns. Boachie-Ansah also noted differences between the clans of Wenchi and Takyiman and those found among the Asante and other southern Akan. Southern Akan clans were associated with animal totems, while those at Wenchi and Takyiman were named after the quarters where their ancestors had settled. Some of these quarters took their names from trees and other landmarks. Boachie-Ansah argued that the differences resulted from a long separation between Bono and the Akan farther south, during which the abusua system and semi-military form of government developed in the southern forest.

=== Settlement layout ===
According to Effah-Gyamfi, the location of villages and towns was determined by four main considerations: the availability of fertile agricultural land and game, access to water, proximity to the capital, and consultation with the principal deity of the people. Local traditions also indicate that settlements were oriented along a north–south axis so that the main street aligned with the movement of the sun.

The size of settlements followed their place in the political hierarchy. Archaeological surveys placed Bono Manso at the highest level, covering about 2.3 square kilometers. Provincial capitals were smaller: Amowi II covered about 1.64 square kilometers and Old Takyiman about 0.85 square kilometers. Dwomti, classified as a town, covered about 0.42 square kilometers, while the villages of Kagbrema and Twema covered about 0.22 and 0.26 square kilometers respectively. The exact boundaries of the abandoned settlements could not always be determined, but the surveyed sites generally became smaller at each level of the settlement hierarchy.

=== Architecture ===
Most houses were constructed using wattle-and-daub techniques and were thatched. However, there are references to flat-roofed houses known as abam, which were reportedly reserved for kings and important nobles. The structures were roofed with boards made from mmaa kube trunks, sealed with daub and finished with clay and plaster. Drainage channels were incorporated into the roof design. Effah-Gyamfi explained that the restriction of flat-roofed houses to royalty may have been northern architectural influence, but traditions deny northern origins for the ruling lineage. He believed that the features may have resulted from cultural contact or the work of immigrant builders rather than migration.

A complete house of an average man was rectangular in plan and organized around a central courtyard. The structure contained between four and six rooms. The family head slept either on a raised clay platform or on a wooden bed supported by short poles, while women and children commonly slept on beaten clay floors covered with raffia mats. Hunters sometimes supplemented their sleeping mats with animal skins from game they had killed. Doorways did not have wooden doors but were covered with hanging raffia mats. One of the rooms was reserved as a kitchen and was often built on a raised clay platform. Water pots, cooking utensils, and other domestic containers were kept there. Fireplaces were sometimes constructed in the kitchen, but they were also frequently located in the central courtyard. Permanent bukyia (hearths) were commonly made in the kitchen to protect fires during rainfall. They could consist of three laterite blocks, three molded clay supports, or three perforated pots designed to prevent cracking from heat. The hearths were occasionally cleaned with clay as part of routine domestic maintenance rather than ritual practice.

=== Burial practices ===
Except for kings, there were no public cemeteries. Children below the age of five were buried in rubbish dumps, inside pots, a practice known as kuku ba, meaning "pot child." Adults were buried inside their rooms in L-shaped graves called daka (grave pit). The horizontal section served as the burial chamber, which was sealed with sticks before the vertical shaft was filled with earth. Death was understood as a transition to the spirit world rather than an end of existence. For this reason, personal belongings such as water, clothing, food, and sponges were buried with the deceased. The rims of pots used for offerings were deliberately broken, but the meaning of this act is unclear. Men were laid facing east, symbolically associated with rising to go to the farm, while women were laid facing west, linked in tradition to the preparation of the evening meal. Kings and queens were buried in a similar manner, but slaves and servants were sometimes killed and interred with them to serve in the spirit world. In such cases, the heads of attendants were placed in the vertical section of the grave.

=== Religion ===
The authority of the Bonohene was both ruler and spiritual head of the state. Religion was based on river deities such as Tano, as well as worship for Asaase Yaa and Nyame. The beliefs were linked to governance and social organization. Akan religious belief centers on Nyame, who is believed to act through lesser deities known as the abosom. Shrines are generally associated either with forest spirits or with the source of the Tano River, which is regarded as the origin of Tano-related deities. The most important of was Taa Kora, which is worshipped at a rock shrine near Tanoboase, where representatives from other Akan states traditionally offer sacrifices and collect sacred water used in state and ancestral rituals. Bono religious traditions linked to Tano River deities such as Taa Mensa and Taa Kora continue to influence Akan beliefs, including indigenous healing practices led by priests (ɔbosomfoɔ) and spirit mediums (ɔkɔmfoɔ).

=== Taboos ===
Amowi is regarded as a sacred site and remains subject to strict ritual prohibitions. Traditions state that no Bono king was permitted to visit the sacred hole, and this restriction is still observed by the Omanhene of Takyiman. Because the emergence from Amowi is said to have occurred on a Friday (Nkyei), farming on Fridays became taboo, and the annual Apɔɔ festival reaches its climax on that day in remembrance of the ancestral emergence. No person is allowed to use land within roughly seventy-five metres of the sacred hole, and entry into the area requires the presence or permission of the chief priest (ɔbosomfoɔ) of the deity Biakru. Violation of the rules is believed to bring misfortune. According to Effah-Gyamfi, similar taboos are associated with the caves of the Gyamma people, who are regarded in tradition as earlier inhabitants of the area. Their ancestral settlement is linked with early iron working, and certain ritual restrictions, including prohibitions on visiting the caves on Fridays, continue to be observed.

== Economy ==
Gold was another important product of Bono's trade with northern markets. The Bono state organized its economic activities into two broad categories: primary and secondary. Primary activities involved direct interaction with the land and included collecting, agriculture, fishing, and hunting. Secondary activities developed from these and included weaving, iron working, gold working, and pottery. Each settlement had designated quarters for craftsmen, traders, and ritual specialists.

=== Gold working ===
Gold production in the Bono state consisted of two main activities: mining and panning, and the smelting and fashioning of gold into objects of value. Traditions indicate that the bulk of Bono gold did not come from the immediate vicinity of the capital but from the Banda area and along the Tain River, particularly at Obuase in the Tain region. Around the capital, gold was obtained from streams such as the Adwoa Sika near Buoyem, Asuo Sika near Bonkwae, and Tano; the names Adwoa Sika and Asuo Sika reflect their association with gold, since sika means gold. In the Tain and Buoyem areas gold was mined through shafts known as nkɔron (mine shafts), circular pits sunk into the ground using special mining mattocks called soroko (mining mattock). These shafts are still remembered in the Nsoko area. Mining labor was often carried out by slaves on behalf of the king. Excavated earth was washed in a wooden bowl called posie (washing bowl), which was shaken repeatedly until gold settled at the bottom. Panning along nearby streams was also common. The proceeds of gold were divided into thirds: one third to the king, one to the village head (odikro), and one to the miner. Gold nuggets known as pokua (gold nuggets) were reserved for the king, and unauthorized mining was punishable by death. Mining in the Tain area was said to be so regular that each week the Bono king received a brass bowl filled with gold.

Goldsmithing traditions declined after the Asante invasion, but accounts by locals indicate that goldsmiths formed a specialized group attached to the royal court. They produced regalia and ornaments including mpempɛsoɔ (finials of state chairs) and afona (state sword). The principal technique was the lost-wax method, similar to that described for brass casting. It was claimed that metal objects in the royal court were made of pure gold, though this may be exaggerated. The wealth of the Bono kings in gold is further reflected in traditions that Ameyaw Kwaku I constructed a gold storehouse at Akyemhatae called Sika puduo (barn for gold), and that even the tail of the king’s horse was decorated with gold nuggets. The unit of currency was gold, measured using standardized gold weights. Chiefs and elders regulated the value of commodities by fixing gold quantities corresponding to units such as peredwan, doma, and dwoa.

=== Craft production ===
Weaving was one of the most widespread craft industries in the Bono state and engaged a considerable portion of the population. While the precise origin of weaving in the state was uncertain, some traditions maintained that it was indigenous, whereas others linked its introduction to northern groups such as the Yabo (Gonja) or the Nkrila (Dyula) traders. Every able-bodied man was expected to learn weaving, and women were responsible for spinning. Children between eight and ten years old were trained in these skills. Cotton, known locally as nsawa (cotton), was grown in the area, and spindle whorls called gyane or gyaneboo (spindle whorls) were obtained from local potters and from northern Dyula traders. With the exception of Asokye, whose inhabitants were regarded as professional weavers for Bono kings, weaving was generally practiced part-time and carried out during leisure hours, especially after farming. The production of cloth was extensive, and traditions state that whenever a Bono man’s kye kye (local cloth) was about six months old it was discarded and replaced, suggesting high output. Earlier kye kye cloths were described as coarser and less colorful than later kente cloths. Certain types of cloth were reserved for kings and nobles, notably Gagawuga and Bew. The name Gagawuga may indicate links with Gao in the Middle Niger region, suggesting long-distance trade connections. The cloth called Bew may either have given its name to Begho or derived its name from the town, which was an important trading center in the medieval period. Local traditions maintain that weaving techniques later spread from Bono to other Akan states further south.

Blacksmithing was central to Bono society, and the atomfoo (blacksmiths) formed a respected and socially distinct group. At the height of Bono power, Nyafoman was regarded as the most important center of the atoo (iron-working industry). Iron ore, referred to as atwetweboɔ (laterite ore), was obtained locally from ferruginized deposits, though some traditions mention iron bars imported from Kong in present-day Ivory Coast. The smelting process, though largely forgotten, is described in detail. A circular depression was dug at the furnace site and channels were carved into it according to the desired size of iron pieces. Fresh sticks were laid across the depression and covered with charcoal. The ore was placed on top and covered again with charcoal, effectively sandwiching it between two layers. Four bellows were inserted around the furnace. After lighting the charcoal, air was pumped at intervals until the ore bloomed and settled into the carved channels. The furnace structure was then broken, water was used to cool the iron, and the slag known as dadebini (slag) was removed. The iron was reheated and forged into tools. Among the principal implements produced were adro (short cutlass), aso (hoe), oso (mattock), soroko (mining mattock), agyane (arrowhead), and pea (sword). The furnace and tools were objects of ritual reverence, and offerings were made to them in a practice called asase hwɛ which is still observed during the Apɔɔ festival. According to Gyamfi, the craft was hereditary and practiced in isolation from settlements, which may explain why it declined more rapidly under European competition than weaving or pottery.

Pottery was practiced almost exclusively by women, though women could also be commissioned to produce special pots for festivals or for the royal court. Because it was an open craft, at least one potter could be found in nearly every village in the Bono state, although certain settlements such as Longoro (Donkoro) Nkwanta, Bonsaaso, and Krobo were noted in tradition for their pottery production. In most places the craft was practiced on a part-time basis, but among the Mɔ (Degɔ speaking) potters of Longoro Nkwanta it was more specialized. The industry was hereditary, with particular houses becoming known for pottery across generations until competition from European imports weakened local production. Clay, called boo (clay), was obtained from sources located between five and twenty kilometers from settlements. Before collecting clay, simple rites were performed, and it was forbidden to engage in sexual intercourse prior to entering the clay site, as violation was believed to cause pots to crack during firing or even lead to collapse of the clay pit. Occasionally a fowl was sacrificed to boo to ensure successful production. Clay was gathered by the potter and her children, though it could also be transported to the Dwasibirim (market) and sold to other potters, a practice still observed in Takyiman where clay is brought from Nsuta, about twenty kilometers away. Two principal manufacturing techniques were used: the molding method,where a lump of clay was shaped into a vessel, and the coil method, in which rolled strips of clay were layered to build up the walls of a pot, with the molding method being more common. Pots were traded over distances ranging from twenty to fifty kilometers. In some areas a tuber of yam could be exchanged for an ahina (water pot), with price differences depending on whether the customer traveled to the potter or vice versa. In addition to pots and bowls, potters also produced abua (smoking pipes) and gyaneboo or gyane (spindle whorls).

Beads in the Bono state were associated with conflicting traditions about their origin and manufacture. Some accounts claimed that beads could multiply, that they were found in streams, dug from the ground, or even made by dwarfs, while others maintained that many were brought into the state by foreign traders. At the same time, it was generally accepted that local smiths also produced beads. Because smithing was a restricted and specialized craft, the secrecy surrounding its techniques may have contributed to myths that attributed bead production to supernatural sources rather than identifiable craftsmen. Locally made beads were divided into two main categories: stone and seed beads, and other beads made by smiths. Stone beads, regarded as among the earliest in the Bono state, were made of quartz, shaped round or flat, perforated, and strung together. Very hard seeds such as Adia and Akonkonanini were collected, boiled, perforated, and strung. Other beads said to be locally made included Bota, Tiwa, Bodom, and Tete Aso. However, the origin of Bodom beads has been suggested to lie in the eastern Mediterranean, from where they may have been brought across the Sahara in precolonial times. If so, traditions claiming Bodom beads were locally made may reflect local imitation of imported examples rather than original manufacture.

The beads that were said to have been imported into the state were called Amankwatia, Neyannee, Akommero, and Anenkyenemma. They were worn by women, though chiefs and priests also wore them during ceremonial occasions. In earlier times, certain beads were restricted to particular clans. The women of the Oyoko clan wore Bodom beads, while women in the Ekoona clan of the Kurontire wore Bota beads. According to Effah-Gyamfi many of these restrictions had later been forgotten. Outside of ornamental wear, they also served ritual and medicinal purposes. Bodom, Bota, and Tete Aso were primarily used for ornamentation. In contrast, Amankwatia and Abia were associated with ease in childbirth, Akommero was linked to curing sleeping sickness, convulsions, and impotence, and Tiwa was used to ward off evil spirits. Locally classified beads were ornamental, while those considered imported were more often associated with ritual and medicinal functions.

=== Agrarian production ===
Bono’s location gave access to both forest and savanna products, such as rice, yams, sorghum, wild game, and other foods. An Akan folktale recounts how Ntikuma, son of Kwaku Ananse, was instructed by an old woman in a hole to harvest and cook habayere. The narrative is interpreted as preserving memory of an early stage in yam cultivation, suggesting that cultivated yam developed from prolonged collection of wild varieties.Bayere (yam) was described as the principal and most ancient indigenous crop of the Bono state. Traditions preserve two main accounts of its early cultivation, one centered on Menji and another on Taa Mensah. In the Menji version, cultivation began during a famine after a deity instructed the people to harvest and cook the plant. From that time, yam cultivation spread to other areas and became associated with annual festivals marking its arrival. Yams were closely connected with ritual life, and their antiquity is reflected in their association with the ancient Apɔɔ and Fokɔ festivals. By contrast, crops such as cocoyam, maize, bananas, and plantains are not associated with early myths or ritual traditions, which suggests they were later introductions that eventually became important.

Other wild foods included forest fruits likekuro (Bosqueia sp.) and akontoma (Carpodinus hirsutus), as well as savanna fruits like aboboma (Annona arenaria), akonlɔ (Strychnos spinosa), and abotoɔ (Griffonia sp.). Mushrooms (Agaricus bisporus), snails (Achatina sp.), and palm nuts (Elaeis guineensis) were also collected, particularly in wetter environments. Wild food collection formed an important component of subsistence. Food items gathered in their natural state included kookoo (Colocasia antiquorum), akɛm (Dioscorea bulbifera), nkramfoɔ (Dioscorea cayenensis), and habayere (Dioscorea sp.). These were found in forest and semi-forest environments, and traditions describe people roaming the forest in search of them, especially during times of famine.

Fishing was important in the local economy, particularly along the rivers Fia, Pru, and Tano. Three main methods are described. Basket traps (apuwie) were used in shallow waters. River poisoning (dompo) involved pounding the bark of the potrodom tree (Erythrophleum guineense) and mixing it into the water to stun fish. In smaller streams, women temporarily dammed sections and bailed out water (ko ahwe) until fish and crabs were exposed and collected. Hunting (abɔ or abayo) held high social status and is frequently associated in tradition with the founding of villages and towns. In times of war, hunters formed the rank and file of the army and were credited with discovering new settlements and food resources. Two main forms are identified: big-game and small-game hunting. Big-game hunting included animals such as elephant (sono), hippopotamus (susumo), and buffalo (kɔkɔ). Small-game hunting involved duikers, antelopes, and grasscutters and was more frequent. Weapons included locally made short guns, bows and arrows, traps, and concealed pits. Later, muzzle-loaded Dane guns (ananta) increased the effectiveness of hunting and made big-game hunting more common.

=== Trade ===
Trade within Bono took place at markets such as Longoro Nkwanta, Nyafoman, and Dewoman. Yams and sorghum were sold alongside pottery, baskets, farm tools, and locally made cloth. Salt came from Krakye, Daboya, and the coast, while traders from Owhim, Kaase, and Denkyira bought cloth from Bono and Nsokɔ. Begho, also known as Nsokɔ, was an independent trading town with close ties to Bono. Its population included Akan and Mande communities, and northern caravans were reaching the town by about 1100 AD. Gold, kola nuts, ivory, salt, leather, cloth, and copper alloys were traded there. Contact with Mande merchants also introduced Mande words into Akan, including kramo (Muslim), oponko (horse), gyata (lion), and adaka (box).

Long-distance trade in Bono centered on Dwabirim, a market about sixteen kilometres south of Bono Manso. Traders from Mossi, Dyula, Hausa, and Bontuku came to the market, which was supervised by the "sons" of the Bono king. One of the main routes ran through Bontuku and connected Bono with Kong, Bouna, Djenné, and the Middle Niger. Traders travelling south passed through Nsokɔ before reaching Dwabirim. Cloth, brass objects, tobacco, and beads were brought into Bono in exchange for gold and kola. Barter, cowries, and gold dust were used in trade. Barter was common within Bono, while gold dust was used in trade with other states and long-distance merchants. Iron objects called nabuo are also said to have been used as an early form of currency. Gold dust was measured with standardized gold weights.

== Historiography ==
=== John Arthur ===
According to John Arthur, caravans from Djenné, Timbuktu, Sudan, and Egypt frequently travelled to Bono Manso for trade.

=== Robert Sutherland Rattray ===
Rattray noted that the clan system he found at Takyiman differed from the Asante and Fante. The Asante and Fante were divided into named totemic clans, while the Bono of Takyiman identified themselves by the Abronno, or streets and quarters, of their towns. Rattray considered the difference important because the Bono, Asante, and Fante were generally regarded as closely related peoples. Rattray gave two possible explanations. He suggested that the Bono, Fante, and Asante may once have shared a system based on streets, with the Bono retaining it after the Fante and Asante adopted their later totemic clans. His other explanation was that the Bono and Asante had different origins and that the Asante brought their clan organization into Bono after the Asante conquest. Rattray did not decide between the two explanations.

=== Jack Goody ===
Jack Goody divided the population of the region between lineages claiming local origin and those with traditions of immigration. He placed the Takyiman royal lineage among the former and interpreted traditions of ancestors emerging from nearby caves as claims to local origin. Other lineages traced their arrival to refugees, hunters, or warriors. He also questioned the view that the region had once been occupied by a Guang-speaking population that later adopted Twi, stating that there was little evidence for it. Goody placed Akan migration into the northwest before the rise of the Asante Empire. He described the movement from Adanse and the Kumasi area as the arrival of settlers and refugees rather than a military invasion. Some settled in Nkoranza, while others moved farther northwest toward Bondoukou. Over time, Akan-speaking settlers in the region became identified as Brong. Goody believed that the presence of earlier settlers later made Asante expansion into the northwest easier.

=== Adu Boahen ===
According to Adu Boahen, there was no evidence for a migration from either the Ghana Empire or the Sahara. Boahen initially excluded the Bono from the Akan partly because of Rattray's account of their social divisions. He later changed his position after his own fieldwork and linguistic evidence showed that Bono was a dialect of Twi.

=== Dennis M. Warren ===
Dennis M. Warren criticized Eva Meyerowitz's reconstruction of the history of the Bono of Techiman. Meyerowitz dated the founding of Bono Manso to 1295 CE, a date Warren and other scholars regarded as unsupported by the available evidence. Warren questioned her use of oral traditions, linguistic evidence, and precise dates for early Bono rulers. He was unable to confirm her list of thirty-seven rulers from 1295 to 1950 with elders at Techiman, and some of the people she cited as informants denied providing the names attributed to them. Warren also examined the Techiman stool rooms and found eight ancestral stools, none of which he dated earlier than the 18th century. He found no evidence for the gold-nugget containers that Meyerowitz said had been used to record the lengths of reigns.

Warren also found repeated names under different spellings, inconsistent translations, and problems with Meyerowitz's chronology. Some chiefs whom she placed in the 15th century belonged after the Asante–Bono wars of 1722–1723. He argued that much of her material consisted of separate statements rather than established oral traditions and rejected her account of a Bono migration from Timbuktu. The traditions Warren recorded instead traced Bono origins to local sacred places such as Amowi. He also noted that Meyerowitz's accounts had been repeated in school textbooks and later histories. Warren argued that the chronology of Techiman-Bono should be reconstructed from evidence that could be checked against sources from the 18th and 19th centuries.

=== Colin Flight ===
Colin Flight re-examined Eva Meyerowitz's chronology of Bono Manso using statistical analysis and comparisons with Arabic and colonial sources. He noted that Meyerowitz's research at Techiman during the 1940s was carried out with the support of Nana Akumfi Ameyaw III. Flight argued that Ameyaw hoped her work would strengthen Techiman's position within the Ashanti Confederacy. Meyerowitz's chronology was based on a reported custom in which each king placed a gold nugget in a brass vessel (kuduo) every year, while each queen mother placed a silver bead or cowry in a decorated pot. The contents were said to record the number of years each ruler had reigned. According to Flight, the objects were counted in 1945 by Kofi Antubam, Meyerowitz's interpreter, who sent the figures to her for use in reconstructing the Bono dynasty.

=== Kwame Arhin ===
Kwame Arhin described Bono Manso as an early Brong center whose trade was linked with Begho and with Akan and Mande traders. He also suggested that the name "Brong" was originally used by the Asante for people living north of Kumasi, where Bono Manso was the main state.

=== J.K. Fynn ===
J. K. Fynn questioned the use of street and quarter organization to separate the Bono from other Akan peoples. From his study of Fante social and political organization, he believed that organization based on streets and quarters was also found among the Fante and was not limited to Guan speaking people.

=== F. K. Buah ===
F. K. Buah suggested Bono as one of the earliest Akan states. He recorded traditions that linked the later states of Denkyira, Akyem, and Asante with movements of people from Bono. He also mentioned traditions that traced the founders of Bono to northern areas, including Borno and regions inhabited by the Mossi. Buah also recorded a different Akan tradition that placed the original home of the Akan in Adanse. In this tradition, Adanse was the center from which Akan groups dispersed and the place where God first began the creation of the world.

=== Kwaku Effah-Gyamfi ===
Kwaku Effah-Gyamfi argued that oral traditions could be used to study Bono history when compared with other traditions and archaeological evidence. Following scholars such as Jan Vansina and R. Oliver, he treated oral traditions as historical sources but warned that they could change over time, especially when political disputes were involved. He criticized some earlier accounts of Bono history, including the work of Eva Meyerowitz, for problems in their use of oral traditions.

Effah-Gyamfi collected traditions from thirteen villages and two towns and interviewed about fifty people, including chiefs, sub-chiefs, stool custodians, artisans, palace officials, elders, and members of royal families. He compared accounts from different informants and communities before using them in his reconstruction. He found political traditions more difficult to use in areas affected by the Asante conquest. Traditions from Nkoransa gave greater importance to the achievements of Baffo Pim, while some accounts from Takyiman exaggerated the wealth and power of the Bono kings. He considered traditions about settlement, trade, crafts, and everyday life less affected by these disputes. Effah-Gyamfi also noted similarities between traditions from Takyiman and the Fante coast. Some Fante traditions traced part of their population to Takyiman, while names and titles found in the two areas were similar. The Takyiman stool title Akumfi was compared with Ekumfi in the Fante area and noted that Obunumankoma, Adapagya, and Osono appear in traditions from both regions. He also cited Thomas Bowdich, who recorded in 1819 that the Fante regarded Takyiman as a former homeland.

Effah-Gyamfi used archaeology to examine the earlier history of the Bono Manso area. It was noted that little was known about the period between the Food Producing and Early Iron Age and the emergence of the Akan states. Sites associated with the Kintampo tradition around Bono Manso were mainly found at caves and rock shelters, unlike those around Begho, which were generally open-air sites. He cautioned that this difference may have resulted from the local landscape rather than differences in age. Excavations also found evidence of iron smelting dating to the third century CE, while Amowi and Atwetwebooso showed occupation before the period associated with the Sahelian empires. Excavations at Bono Manso found evidence of settlement, farming, and ironworking before the period of documented trade with the north.

=== P. L. Shinnie ===
In his introduction to Effah-Gyamfi's study, P. L. Shinnie discussed the use of oral traditions and archaeology to reconstruct the early history of Bono. Effah-Gyamfi's earlier research used oral traditions, while his later work focused on the archaeology of Manso and the development of early Akan towns. The research was also influenced by criticism of Eva Meyerowitz and her account of a northern origin for the Akan.

Shinnie regarded Bono Manso as an important site for studying early Akan towns because it had been the capital of Bono and was close to Begho, then considered one of the earliest towns in Ghana. The research examined the size and layout of Bono Manso, compared it with nearby settlements, and considered whether early Akan towns had walls or separate quarters for different groups.

Shinnie also noted problems with the research. Only part of Bono Manso could be excavated, and farming had destroyed some remains. The people living at Manso traced most of their ancestry to Asante settlers who arrived after the conquest of 1723 and knew little about the earlier town. People in Takyiman preserved traditions about Bono Manso but no longer lived at the site, making it difficult to connect some traditions with particular places and remains.

=== Merrick Posnansky ===
In Posnansky’s excavations at Begho identified distinct Kramo quarters occupied by Mande-speaking Muslims, separate from the Brong quarters. While acknowledging their role in long-distance trade, he does not present them as political rulers of the town.

=== Brian C. Vivian ===
Brian C. Vivian used the excavations at Adansemanso to question earlier accounts that placed the development of Akan states along the northern edge of the forest. The finds at Adansemanso showed that settlements were already developing in the central forest between the 13th and 15th centuries, during the same period as Begho and Bono Manso.

=== Michael A. Gomez ===
Michael A. Gomez traced gold from Begho north through Kong and Bobo-Dioulasso to the Djenné–Timbuktu trade routes and from there across the Sahara.

=== Irene Odotei and A. K. Awedoba ===
In their interpretations, Irene Odotei and A. K. Awedoba describe Bono as the earliest cradle of Akan civilization, portraying it as a foundational center from which later Akan political institutions emerged.

=== Kwasi Konadu ===
Kwasi Konadu placed the development of Bono among older Akan-speaking communities in the forest rather than in migrations from the Ghana Empire or other northern regions. He traced the abusua, religious authority, and royal regalia to Akan societies rather than to Mande or Islamic influence. Traditions recorded at Techiman and Begho also placed Bono origins within the region, including at Amowi. In his view, earlier migration theories confused contact with northern traders with the origins of Bono political and cultural institutions. Muslim merchants took part in regional trade, but practices such as gold weighing and the use of royal regalia predated the height of Muslim trade in the area. Mande loanwords in Twi likewise showed contact between the two groups but did not establish that Akan institutions were borrowed from Mande-speaking peoples. He also disputed proposed Mande and Arabic origins for some Akan gold terminology and placed the development of gold production within the Akan forest before its incorporation into trans-Saharan trade.

== Legacy ==
Bono political institutions continued at Takyiman after the fall of Bono Manso and through the periods of Asante and British rule. In 1948, Takyiman withdrew from the Asante Confederacy, followed by the formation of the Bono Federation in 1951. The government of Ghana created the Brong-Ahafo Region and the Brong-Ahafo House of Chiefs in 1960. In the late twentieth century, Bono scholars and traditional leaders established the Bonoman Resource Center for Indigenous Knowledge (BRCIK) in Takyiman. The center records Bono medicinal practices, oral traditions, and religious knowledge.

== See also ==
- Akan People
- Bono People
- Bono Manso
- Old Wenchi
- Gyaman
- Old Banda
- Asante Empire
- List of rulers of the Akan state of Bono-Tekyiman

== Sources ==
- Ameyaw, Nana Kwakye (1979). "Bono-Manso and Techiman". In Arhin, Kwame (ed.). A Profile of Brong Kyempim: Essays on the Archaeology, History, Language and Politics of the Brong Peoples of Ghana. Legon: Institute of Development Studies and Partner Organisations.
- Andah, B. W.; Anquandah, J. (1988). "The Guinean Belt: The Peoples Between Mount Cameroon and the Ivory Coast". In El Fasi, M.; Hrbek, I. (eds.). General History of Africa. Paris: UNESCO. pp. 489–.
- Anquandah, James (1993). "Urbanization and State Formation in Ghana During the Iron Age". In Shaw, Thurston; Sinclair, Paul; Andah, Bassey; Okpoko, Alex (eds.). The Archaeology of Africa: Food, Metals and Towns. London: Routledge. pp. 642–650.
- Anquandah, James (2013). "The People of Ghana: Their Origins and Cultures". Transactions of the Historical Society of Ghana (15): 1–25. JSTOR 43855009.
- Arhin, Kwame (1979). A Profile of Brong Kyempim: Essays on the Archaeology, History, Language and Politics of the Brong Peoples of Ghana. Legon: Institute of Development Studies and Partner Organisations.
- Arthur, John (1961). Brong Ahafo Handbook. Graphic Press.
- Boachie-Ansah, James (2015). "Report on an Excavation Conducted in January, 2013 at Bonoso, Ghana" (PDF). Nyame Akuma (84): 41–54.
- Boahen, A. Adu (2005). "Akan and Asante: Farmers, Traders, and the Emergence of Akan States". In Shillington, Kevin (ed.). Encyclopedia of African History. New York: Fitzroy Dearborn. pp. 31–33.
- Buah, F. K. (1998). A History of Ghana. Macmillan.
- Compton, Anne M. (2017). Excavations at Kranka Dada: An Examination of Daily Life, Trade, and Ritual in the Bono Manso Region. BAR Publishing.
- Crossland, L. B. (1989). Pottery from the Begho-B2 Site, Ghana. Calgary: University of Calgary Press.
- Davidson, Basil (2014). West Africa Before the Colonial Era: A History to 1850. Taylor and Francis. ISBN 9781317882657.
- Effah-Gyamfi, E. (1974). "Aspects of the Archaeology and Traditions of the Bono State". Transactions of the Historical Society of Ghana. 15 (2): 217–227. JSTOR 41406570.
- Effah-Gyamfi, Kwaku (1979). Traditional History of the Bono State. Legon: Institute of African Studies, University of Ghana.
- Effah-Gyamfi, Kwaku (1985). Bono Manso: An Archaeological Investigation into Early Akan Urbanism. University of Calgary Press.
- Flight, Colin (1970). "The Chronology of the Kings and Queenmothers of Bono-Manso: A Revaluation of the Evidence". The Journal of African History. 11 (2): 259–268. JSTOR 180321.
- Goody, Jack (1964). "The Mande and the Akan Hinterland". In Vansina, J.; Mauny, R.; Thomas, L. V. (eds.). The Historian in Tropical Africa: Studies Presented and Discussed at the Fourth International African Seminar at the University of Dakar, Senegal 1961. London: Oxford University Press. pp. 192–218.
- Gomez, Michael A. (2000). Exchanging Our Country Marks: The Transformation of African Identities in the Colonial and Antebellum South. Chapel Hill: University of North Carolina Press.
- Goody, Jack (1965). "Introduction". In Goody, Jack; Arhin, Kwame (eds.). Ashanti and the Northwest. Research Review, Supplement No. 1. Legon: Institute of African Studies, University of Ghana. pp. 1–110 – via Internet Archive.
- Jones, D. H. (1962). "Jakpa and the Foundation of Gonja". Transactions of the Historical Society of Ghana. 6: 1–29. JSTOR 41405749.
- Konadu, Kwasi (2007). Indigenous Medicine and Knowledge in African Society. New York: Routledge.
- Konadu, Kwasi (2010). The Akan Diaspora in the Americas. Oxford: Oxford University Press.
- Konadu, Kwasi; Campbell, Clifford C. (2016). The Ghana Reader: History, Culture, Politics. Duke University Press.
- Konadu, Kwasi (2022). "A Manden Myth in the Akan Forests of Gold" (PDF). African Economic History. 50 (2): 64–86.
- Kumah, Daniel (2024). "Early Trade and Urbanization in Pre-Modern Ghana: Evidence from Begho ca 1000 to 1700 AD". In Akurang-Parry, Kwabena O.; Biveridge, Fritz (eds.). History, Culture and Heritage of Ghana: Essays in Honour of Professor Robert Addo-Fening. Yaoundé: Langaa RPCIG. pp. 165–200.
- Levtzion, Nehemia (1973). Ancient Ghana and Mali. London: Methuen. ISBN 978-0-416-75830-6.
- Odoom, K. O. (1979). "A Note on the History of Islam in Brong-Ahafo". In Arhin, Kwame (ed.). A Profile of Brong Kyempim. Institute of Development Studies.
- Odotei, Irene K.; Awedoba, A. K. (2006). Chieftaincy in Ghana: Culture, Governance and Development. Sub-Saharan Publishers.
- Posnansky, Merrick (2015). "Begho: Life and Times". Journal of West African History. 1 (2): 95–118. doi:10.14321/jwestafrihist.1.2.0095. JSTOR 10.14321/jwestafrihist.1.2.0095.
- Rattray, R. S. (1956). Ashanti Law and Constitution. Oxford: Oxford Clarendon Press.
- Shinnie, P. L.; Effah-Gyamfi, Kwaku (1985). "Editor's Introduction". Bono Manso: An Archaeological Investigation into Early Akan Urbanism. University of Calgary Press. pp. 1–6.
- Vivian, Brian C. (1996). "Recent Excavations of Adansemanso" (PDF). Nyame Akuma (46): 37–39.
- Warren, Dennis M. (1975). "Bono Royal Regalia". African Arts. 8 (2): 16–21. doi:10.2307/3334826. JSTOR 3334826.
- Warren, Dennis M. (1976). "The Use and Misuse of Ethnohistorical Data in the Reconstruction of Techiman-Bono (Ghana) History". Ethnohistory. 23 (4): 365–385. JSTOR 481652.
- Wilks, Ivor (1961). "The Rise of the Akwamu Empire, 1650–1710". Transactions of the Historical Society of Ghana. 4 (2): 25–62.
