= Kofi =

- Gender: Male

Origin
- Origin: Akan people
- Meaning: born on a Friday
- Region of origin: Ghana

Other names
- Related names: Kwadwo (Monday); Kwabena (Tuesday); Kwaku/Kweku (Wednesday); Yaw (Thursday); Kofi (Friday); Kwame (Saturday); Akwasi/Kwesi (Sunday)

Kofi is an Akan masculine given name among the Akan people (such as the Bono, Akyem, Akwamu, Ashanti and Fante) in Ghana that is given to a boy born on Friday. Traditionally in Ghana, a child would receive their Akan day name during their Outdooring, eight days after birth.

According to Akan tradition, people born on particular days exhibit certain characteristics or attributes. Kofi has the appellation "Kyini", "Otuo" and "Ntiful" meaning "wanderer" and "traveller."

== Origin and meaning of Kofi ==
In the Akan culture, day names are known to be derived from deities. Kofi originated from Kwaofida and the Lord of life's home deity of the day Friday. Males named Kofi are known to be adventurers and indecisive thus taking time to settle. They are highly motivated and competent.

== Male variants of Kofi ==
Day names in Ghana vary in spelling among the various Akan subgroups. The name is spelt Kofi by the Akuapem, Ashanti, Bono, Akwamu, Akyem and Fante subgroups. Other versions of Kofi are Fiifi and Yoofi.

== Female version of Kofi ==
In the Akan culture and other local cultures in Ghana, day names come in pairs for males and females. The variant of the name used for a female child born on Friday is Efua, Afua, Afia, Effie.

== Notable people with the name ==
Most Ghanaian children have their cultural day names in combination with their English or Christian names. Some notable people with such names are:

- Enoch Kofi Adu (born 1990), Ghanaian footballer
- John Kufuor (born 1938), second President of the Fourth Republic of Ghana (2001–2009)
- Kofi Abrefa Busia (1913–1978), Prime Minister of Ghana
- Kofi Adu (born 1969), Ghanaian comedian and actor
- Kofi Amichia (born 1994), American football player
- Kofi Amoah Prah (born 1974) Ghanaian-born retired German long jumper
- Kofi Amponsah (born 1978), Ghanaian footballer
- Kofi Annan (1938–2018), United Nations Secretary General
- Kofi Ansah (1951–2014), Ghanaian fashion designer
- Kofi Asante Ofori-Atta (1912–1978), Ghanaian politician
- Kofi Balmer (born 2000), Northern Irish professional soccer player
- Kofi Burbridge (1961–2019), American musician
- Kofi Cockburn (born 1999), Jamaican basketball player
- Kofi Esaw, Togolese politician and diplomat, Minister of Foreign Affairs from 2008 to 2010 and Minister of Justice since 2013
- Kofi Jantuah (born 1974), Ghanaian professional boxer
- Kofi Karikari (c. 1837–1884), ninth Ashanti king (1867–1874)
- Kofi Kayiga (born 1943), formerly known as Ricardo Wilkins, Jamaican-born artist
- Kofi Middleton Mends (1939–2016), Ghanaian actor
- Kofi Nahaje Sarkodie-Mensah (Kofi Sarkodie-Mensah) (born 1981), Ghanaian-American professional wrestler with the ring name Kofi Kingston
- Kofi Sarkodie (born 1991), American Major League Soccer player
- Kofi Siriboe (born 1994), American actor and model
- Osei Kofi Tutu I (reigned c. 1675 / c. 1680 – c. 1717), one of the co-founders of the Empire of Ashanti
- Seth Kofi Obeng (born 1945), Chief of Defence Staff, Ghana

== See also ==
- Cuffee or Cuffey, an African-American variant of the name
- Koffi, a surname and masculine given name
