= Afia =

- Gender: Female

Origin
- Origin: Ashanti people
- Meaning: born on a Friday
- Region of origin: Ashanti; Empire of Ashanti

Other names
- Related names: Kofi: Adwoa (Monday); Abena (Tuesday); Akua (Wednesday); Yaa (Thursday); Afia (Friday); Ama (Saturday); Akosua (Sunday)

Afia is an Akan female given name among the Akan people (i.e. Ashanti, Akuapem, Akyem, Fante) in Ghana that means "born on Friday" in Akan language, following their day naming system. People born on particular days are supposed to exhibit the characteristics, or attributes and philosophy, associated with the days. Afia has the appellation ''Baafi'', ''Nkosuo'', which means "wanderer" or "traveller".

== Origin and meaning ==
In the Akan culture, day names are known to be derived from deities. Afia originates from Kwaofida, which means "Lord of life's home day". Those with this name are adventurers and indecisive, thus taking time to settle, and are highly motivated and competent.

== Female variant of Afia ==
Day names in Ghana have varying spellings, because of the various Akan subgroups. Each Akan subgroup has a similar or different spelling for the day name to other Akan subgroups. Afia is spelt thus by the Akuapem and Ashanti subgroups, while the Fante subgroup and spell it as Efua and Afua.

== Male version of Afia ==
In the Akan culture and other local cultures in Ghana, day names come in pairs for males and females. The variant of the name used for a male child born on Friday is Kofi, Fiifi and Fi.

== Notable people called Afia ==
Most Ghanaian children have their cultural day names in combination with their English or Christian names. Some notable people with such names are:

- Afia Charles (born 1992), sprinter representing Antigua and Barbuda
- Afia Masood, fictional character in EastEnders
- Afia Nathaniel (born before 1991), Pakistani filmmaker
- Afia Pokua, Ghanaian media personality, known professionally as Vim Lady
- Afia Salam, Pakistani journalist and media development specialist
- Afia Schwarzenegger (born 1982), Ghanaian media personality
- Afia Amankwaah Tamakloe, Ghanaian television and radio personality, journalist, and health advocate
- Moshik Afia (born 1974), Israeli singer
- Nura Afia (born 1993), American beauty vlogger
