= Kwesi =

Kwesi is a Ghanaian male given name. In the Ghanaian tradition of "day names", it refers to children born on a Sunday. Notable people with this name include:

- Kwesi Adofo-Mensah (born 1981), American football executive
- Kwesi Ahoomey-Zunu, Togolese politician
- Kwesi Ahwoi (born 1946), Ghanaian politician
- Kwesi Akomia Kyeremateng, Ghanaian politician
- Kwesi Akwansah Andam (1946–2007), Ghanaian academic
- Kwesi Amissah-Arthur (1951–2018), Ghanaian economist, academic and politician
- Kwesi Amoako Atta (born 1951), Ghanaian lawyer, management consultant and politician
- Kwesi Amoako-Atta (1920–1983), Ghanaian banker and politician
- Kwesi Appiah (born 1990), Ghanaian football player
- Kwesi Armah (1929–2006), Ghanaian politician and diplomat
- Kwesi Arthur (born 1994), Ghanaian musician
- Kwesi Boakye (born 1999), American actor, voice actor and singer
- Kwesi Botchwey (1942–2022), Ghanaian politician
- Kwesi Brew (1928–2007), Ghanaian poet and diplomat
- Kwesi Browne (born 1994), Trinidad and Tobago male track cyclist, representing Trinidad and Tobago at competitions
- Kwesi Dickson (1929–2005), Ghanaian theologian
- Benjamin Henrichs (full name Benjamin Paa Kwesi Henrichs, born 1997), German footballer
- Linton Kwesi Johnson (born 1952), Jamaican-British musician
- Kwesi Nyantakyi, Ghanaian banker
- Kwesi Owusu (1954–2025), Ghanaian author and filmmaker
- Kwesi Plange (1926–1953), Ghanaian politician
- Kwesi Prah (born 1942), Ghanaian author
- Kwesi Pratt Jnr (born 1953), Ghanaian journalist
- Kwesi Sinclair (born 1978), Guyanese cricket player
- Kwesi Slay (born 1990), Ghanaian hip hop artist
- Kwesi Wilson (died 2019), Ghanaian musician
- Kwesi Yankah, Ghanaian academic, author and university administrator

== See also ==
- Kwasi (alternative spelling)
- Akwasi (alternative spelling)
- Akosua (female version)
