= Kwasi =

Kwasi/Kwesi
- Gender: Male
- Name day: Sunday

Origin
- Origin: Akan
- Meaning: A handsome, confident, intelligent, and well rounded man
- Region of origin: Ghana

Kwasi is an Akan day name given in Ghana to a boy born on a Sunday (Kwasiada). Notable people with this name include:

- Kwasi Sintim Aboagye, Ghanaian teacher, businessman and politician of the 1950s and 1960s
- Kwasi Kwarfo Adarkwa, Ghanaian academic, Vice Chancellor of the Kwame Nkrumah University of Science and Technology 2006–2010
- Kwasi Boateng Adjei (born 1954), Ghanaian politician
- Kwasi Ameyaw-Cheremeh (born 1966), Ghanaian politician
- Kwasi Anin-Yeboah (born 1953), Ghanaian lawyer and Chief Justice
- Kwasi Annoh Ankama (1957–2010), Ghanaian lawyer and politician
- Kwasi Sainti Baffoe-Bonnie (1950–2021), Ghanaian media administrator and politician
- Kwasi Boachi (1827–1904), Dutch mining engineer, Prince of Ashanti Empire
- Kwasi Kyei Darwkah (born 1965), Ghanaian broadcaster
- Kwasi Danquah III (born 1986), Ghanaian-British businessman, music executive known as Tinchi Stryder
- Kwasi Donsu (born 1995), Ghanaian footballer
- Kwasi Etu-Bonde, Ghanaian politician
- Kwasi Agyemang Gyan-Tutu (born 1957), Ghanaian politician
- Kwasi James (born 1995), Bermudian cricketer
- Kwasi Konadu, Jamaican-American author, scholar, educator, writer, editor, and historian
- Kwasi Kwarteng (born 26 May 1975), British Conservative Party politician
- Kwasi Jones Martin, English songwriter and producer also known as Eddie Martin
- Kwasi Obiri-Danso, Ghanaian biological scientist and academic
- Kwasi Opoku-Amankwa, Ghanaian academic and civil servant
- Kwasi Owusu (1945–2020), Ghanaian footballer
- Kwasi Owusu-Yeboa, Ghanaian politician and diplomat
- Kwasi Poku, Canadian soccer player
- Kwasi Sibo (born 1998), Ghanaian footballer
- Kwasi Songui, Canadian actor
- Kwasi Thompson (born 1975), Bahamian politician
- Kwasi Wiredu (born 1931), Ghanaian philosopher
- Kwasi Okyere Wriedt (born 1994), Ghanaian footballer

== See also ==
- Akwasi (alternative spelling)
- Kwesi (alternative spelling)
- Akosua (female version)
- Kwasi Buokrom, town in Brong Ahafo Region, Ghana
- Kwazii cat, a character on the Octonauts
