= Afua =

Afua (Efua)
- Pronunciation: /ˈæfwə/, AF-wə; /ˈɛfwə/, EF-wə
- Gender: Female

Origin
- Origin: Akan people
- Meaning: Born on a Friday

Other names
- Related names: Adjoa (Monday); Abena (Tuesday); Ekua (Wednesday); Aba (Thursday); Afua or Efua (Friday); Amba or Ama (Saturday); Esi (Sunday)

Afua (/ˈæfwə/, AF-wə) or Efua (/ˈɛfwə/, EF-wə) is an Akan day name traditionally given to girls born on a Friday; the equivalent male name is Kofi.

== Given name or day name ==
- Afua Adwo Jectey Hesse, Ghanaian pædiatric surgeon and former president of the Medical Women's International Association
- Afua Bruce, American engineer, data executive, professor, and politician
- Afua Cooper (born 1957), Canadian historian and dub poet, born in Jamaica
- Afua Hirsch (born 1981), British writer, broadcaster, and former barrister, born in Norway
- Afua Kobi (fl. 1834–1884), asantehemaa of the Ashanti Empire
- Afua Kuma (1908–1987), Ghanaian oral theologian
- Afua Kyei (born 1982), British financial executive
- Afua Osei, American entrepreneur and public speaker, co-founder of She Leads Africa
- Afua Richardson (born 1980), African–Native American comic book artist
- Efua Asibon, Ghanaian businesswoman
- Efua Baker (born c. 1967), British singer-songwriter and celebrity fitness expert, born in Ghana
- Efua Dorkenoo (1949–2014), affectionately known as "Mama Efua", Ghanaian-British campaigner against female genital mutilation
- Efua Sutherland (1924–1996), Ghanaian playwright, director, dramatist, children's author, poet, educationalist, researcher, child advocate, and cultural activist
- Efua Traoré, Nigerian-German writer

== See also ==
- Afuʻalo Matoto, Tongan political figure and life peer
- Afuang: Bounty Hunter, 1988 Philippine biographical action film
- Charles Afuakwah (born 1966), Scottish former rugby union player born in Ghana
