= Cuffy (disambiguation) =

Cuffy was an Akan slave in the Dutch colony of Berbice (present-day Guyana) who led a revolt of more than 2,500 slaves in 1763.

Cuffy may also refer to:

- Cuffy, a name derived from the Akan name Kofi, meaning "born on a Friday"
- Cuffy, Cher, a commune of the Cher département, in France
- Cuffy (TV series), a British sitcom from the early 1980s
- Cuffy Meigs, a character in Atlas Shrugged

== See also ==
- Cuffee, an African-American first name and surname also derived from Kofi
- William Cuffay, a British political activist
