= Akua =

Female given name among the Akan people

- Gender: Female

Origin
- Origin: Akan people
- Meaning: born on a Wednesday
- Region of origin: Akan people

Other names
- Related names: Adwoa (Monday); Abena (Tuesday); Akua (Wednesday); Yaa (Thursday); Afia (Friday); Ama (Saturday); Akosua (Sunday)

Akua is an Akan female given name among the Akan people (i.e. Ashanti, Akuapem, Bono, Akwamu, Akyem,Fante) in Ghana that means "born on a Wednesday" in Akan language, following their day naming system. People born on particular days are supposed to exhibit the characteristics or attributes and philosophy, associated with the days.

== Origin and meaning ==
In the Akan culture, day names are known to be derived from deities. Akua originated from Wukuada and from the Lord of Life's Sky (heavenly) Host Day deity for Wednesday. Females born on Wednesday are champions of the cause of others. The name is also associated with a spider (Ananse).

== Female variant ==
Day names in Ghana have varying spellings. This is so because of the various Akan subgroups. Each Akan subgroup has a similar or different spelling for the day name to other Akan subgroups. Akua is spelt Akua by the Akuapem, Akyem, Bono and Ashanti subgroups while the Fante subgroup spell it as Ekua or Kuukua.

== Male version ==
In the Akan culture and other local cultures in Ghana, day names come in pairs for males and females. The variant of the name used for a male child born on Wednesday is Kwaku.

== Notable people named Akua ==
- Akua Sakyiwaa Ahenkorah, Ghanaian diplomat
- Akua Anokyewaa (born 1984), Ghanaian footballer
- Akua Asabea Ayisi (1927–2010), Ghanaian High Court Judge, journalist and feminist
- Akua Benjamin, Canadian scholar
- Akua Sena Dansua (born 1958), Ghanaian media and communications consultant, politician and governance and leadership practitioner
- Akua Donkor (1952–2024), Ghanaian politician and the founder and leader of the Ghana Freedom Party
- Akua Lezli Hope, African-American artist, poet and writer
- Akua Kuenyehia (born 1947), Ghanaian lawyer
- Akua Naru, hip hop MC/rapper
- Akua Njeri, American writer and activist
- Akua Obeng-Akrofi (born 1996), Ghanaian sprinter
- Akua Reindorf, British barrister
- Akua Shōma (born 1990), Japanese professional sumo wrestler
- Hilda Akua (born 1991), Ghanaian model and beauty pageant titleholder
- Ranin Akua (born 1972), member of the Parliament of Nauru
- Riddell Akua (born 1963), politician from the Pacific nation of the Republic of Nauru
- Thrixeena Akua (born 1994), Nauruan sprinter
