= Kwadwo =

Kwadwo/Kwadjo/Kojo
- Gender: Male

Origin
- Origin: Akan people
- Meaning: born on a Monday
- Region of origin: Akan people

Other names
- Related names: Kojo, Kwadjo, Cudjoe, Kodwo: Kwadwo/Kwadjo (Monday); Kwabena (Tuesday); Kwaku (Wednesday); Yaw (Thursday); Kofi (Friday); Kwame (Saturday); Akwasi (Sunday)

Kwadwo/Kwadjo/Kojo (Kwadwo in Ghana) is an Akan masculine given name originating from the Akan people, meaning born on a Monday. As an Akan given name, with the Akans being a large ethnic group consisting of various tribes such as the Fante, Asante, Akuapem, Bono, Akyem, among others, Kwadwo/Kwadjo is sometimes written as "Kojo", Kwadwo or Kwadjo and is also used less frequently as a family name (see Akan name). People born on particular days are supposed to exhibit the characteristics or attributes and philosophy, associated with the days. Kwadwo has the appellation Okoto or Asera meaning peace. Thus, males named Kwodwo tend to be peaceful.

== Origin and Meaning of Kwadwo ==
In the Akan culture, day names are known to be derived from deities. Kwadwo originated from Koyayuda and the Lord of Life Firmament deity of the day Monday. Males named Kwadwo tend to be nurturing and achieve a balance between strength and compassion.

== Male variants of Kwadwo ==
Day names in Ghana vary in spelling among the various Akan subgroups. The name is spelt Kwadwo by the Akuapem, Bono, Akyem and Ashanti subgroups while the Fante subgroup spell it as Kwadjo, Kodwo, Cudjoe, Jojo or Kojo.

== Female version of Kwadwo ==
In the Akan culture and other local cultures in Ghana, day names come in pairs for males and females. The variant of the name used for a female child born on Monday is Adwoa.

== Notable people with the name Kwadwo ==
Most Ghanaian children have their cultural day names in combination with their English or Christian names. Some notable people with such names are:

- Kwadwo Adjei-Darko, Ghanaian politician and former Minister for Mines
- Kwadwo Afari-Gyan (born 1945), Ghanaian political scientist and election administrator
- Kwadwo Ani (born 1966), Ghanaian painter
- Kwadwo Asamoah (born 1988), Ghanaian footballer playing for Juventus
- Kwadwo Baah Wiredu (1952–2008), Ghanaian politician
- Kwadwo Boahen (born 2000), Canadian football player
- Kwadwo Boakye Djan, organiser of the 1979 Ghanaian coup
- Kwadwo Osseo-Asare, Ghanaian-born American materials scientist
- Kwadwo Poku (born 1985), Ghanaian footballer playing in Denmark
- Kwadwo Poku (born 1992), Ghanaian footballer
- Osei Kwadwo, late-18th century Ashanti king
- Yasmin Kwadwo (born 1990), German sprint athlete
