= Dambun shinkafa =

Hausa food

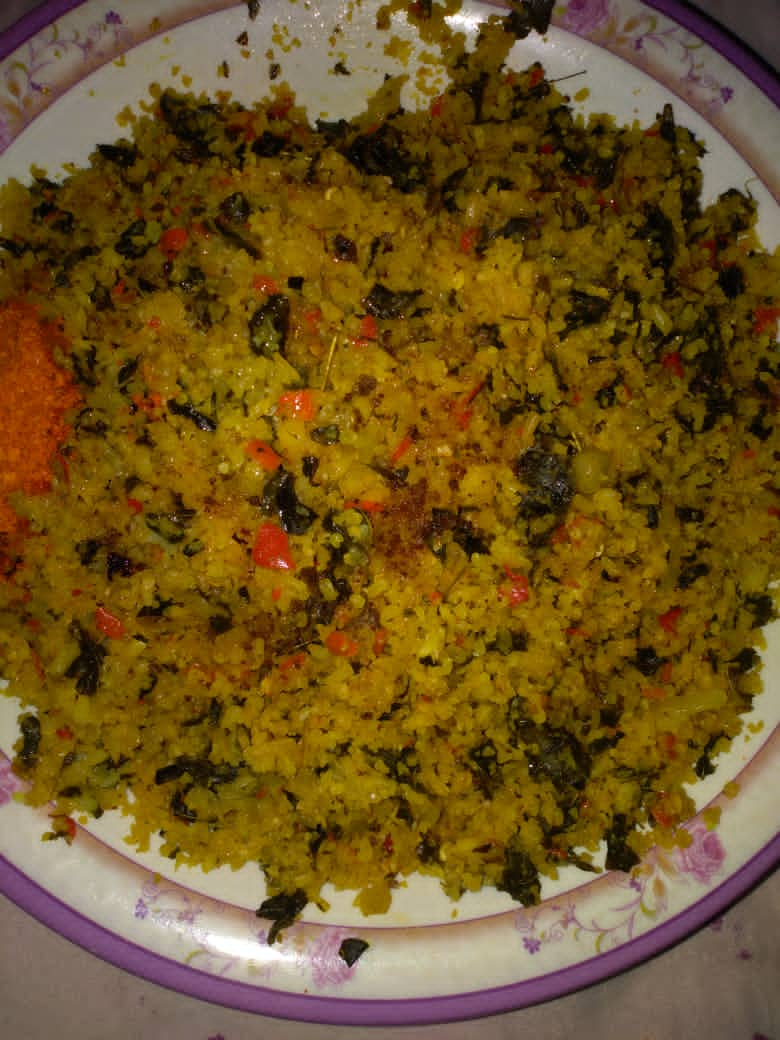

Dambu is an hausa delicacy made from maize known as tsaki or rice, moringa leaves and carrot. There are different types of dambu, but the most common type is dambu shinkafa; this is the dambu made from rice.

== Preparation ==
Rice is grilled such that they are chopped into smaller pieces. Moringa leaf, carrot are added after some minutes, it is spiced with blended pepper and steamed for about 45 minutes. Fried oil is added and served.

== Other types ==
Dambun masara, dambun gero etc. are the other types of dambu made by the Hausa.

== See also ==
- Hausa cuisine
