= Ciminelli =

Ciminelli is a surname. Notable people with the surname include:

- Louis Ciminelli, American defendant in landmark fraud case Ciminelli v. United States
- Lucille Ann Ciminelli (1932–2003), American singer under stage name Lu Ann Simms
- Ryan Ciminelli (born 1986), American bowler
- Serafino de’ Ciminelli dall’Aquila (1466–1500), also called Serafino Ciminelli, Italian poet and musician
- Virgínia Ciminelli (born 1954), Brazilian metallurgist

== See also ==
- Cimino family
