= Kwame =

- Gender: Male

Origin
- Origin: Akan people
- Meaning: born on a Saturday
- Region of origin: Akan people

Other names
- Related names: Kwadwo (Monday); Kwabena (Tuesday); Kwaku (Wednesday); Yaw (Thursday); Kofi (Friday); Kwame (Saturday); Akwasi (Sunday)

Kwame is an Akan masculine given name among the Akan people (such as the Akuapem, Ashanti, Akyem, Bono and Fante) in Ghana which is given to a boy born on Saturday. Traditionally in Ghana, a child would receive their Akan day name during their Outdooring, eight days after birth.

According to Akan tradition, people born on particular days exhibit certain characteristics or attributes. Kwame has the appellation "Atoapoma" or "Oteanankannuro" meaning "combat ready".

The day naming tradition in Ghana extends to folk characters such as Anansi and deities. Traditional Akan religion states that God created himself on Saturday and is therefore also named "Kwame".

== Origin and meaning of Kwame ==
In the Akan culture, day names are derived from deities. Kwame originated from Koyame and the Akan day name God. The name Kwame means extremes in fortune, health and spirituality; versatile, idealistic and intuitive. Males named Kwame are reputed to be talented and good problem solvers.

== Male variants of Kwame ==
Variant spellings include Kwamé, Kouamé, Kwami, Kwamena, and Kwamina, according to the various Akan subgroups. It is spelt Kwame by the Akuapem, Akyem, Bono and Ashanti subgroups, while the Fante subgroup spell it as Kwamena or Kwamina.

== Female version of Kwame ==
In the Akan culture and other local cultures in Ghana, day names come in pairs for males and females. The variant of the name used for a female child born on Saturday is Ama.

== Notable people with the name ==
The most well-known bearer of the name was Kwame Nkrumah, President of Ghana and a founder of Pan-Africanism – mainly due to whom the name spread also to non-Ghanaians.

People with this name include:

- Kwamé, American rapper
- Thatboykwame (previously as Kwame; born 1997), Australian rapper
- Kwame Alexander (born 1968), American writer
- Kwame Ampadu (born 1970), Irish footballer
- Kwame Anthony Appiah (born 1954), English-American philosopher
- Kwame Awuah (born 1995), Canadian soccer player
- Kwame Brown (born 1982), American former basketball player
- Kwame R. Brown (born 1970), American politician
- Kwame Dawes (born 1962), Ghanaian poet
- Kwame Evans Jr. (born 2004), American basketball player
- Kwame Harris (born 1982), American football player
- Kwame Holman, American TV producer
- Kwame Kenyatta (1956–2019), American politician
- Kwame Kilpatrick (born 1970), American politician
- Kwame Kizito (born 1996), Ghanaian footballer
- Kwame Nkrumah (1909–1972), Ghanaian politician
- Kwame Onwuachi (born 1989), American chef
- Kwame Raoul (born 1964), American politician
- Kwame Somburu (1934–2016), American socialist political activist
- Kwame Tucker, Bermudian cricketer
- Kwame Ture (1941–1998), American civil rights activist
- Kwame Vaughn (born 1990), American basketball player
- Kwamena Bartels (born 1947), Ghanaian politician
- Kwamena Ahwoi (born 1951), Ghanaian academic and politician
- Kwamina Ropapa Mensah (born 1997), Ghanaian footballer
- Nana Kwame Adjei-Brenyah (born 1991), American author
- Osei Kwame Panyin, ruler of the Ashanti Empire (1777–1801)
- Paul Kwame Nkegbe (born 1934), Ghanaian politician and military officer
- Zohran Kwame Mamdani (born 1991), American politician

== Fictional character ==
- Kwame (Captain Planet), a fictional character in the animated television series Captain Planet and the Planeteers
- Kwame, a fictional character in British television series I May Destroy You.
- Kwame Asare, birth name of George Knight, a fictional character in the British soap EastEnders
