= Yaa (name) =

- Gender: Female

Origin
- Origin: Akan people
- Meaning: born on a Thursday
- Region of origin: Akan people

Other names
- Related names: Yaw: Adwoa (Monday); Abena (Tuesday); Akua (Wednesday); Yaa (Thursday); Afua (Friday); Ama (Saturday); Akosua (Sunday)

Yaa or Aba is a feminine given name originating from the Akan day naming system, meaning born on a Thursday. Day names are a cultural practice of the Akan people of Ghana. It is actually practised by all Akan (i.e. all the various Akan subgroups) people who follow traditional customs. People born on particular days are supposed to exhibit the characteristics or attributes and philosophy, associated with the days. Yaa has the appellation Busuo or Seandze meaning brave. Thus, females named Yaa are supposed to be brave.

== Origin and meaning of Yaa ==
In the Akan culture, day names are known to be derived from deities. Yaa is originated from Yawoada and known as the Day of reproduction.

== Female variants of Yaa ==
Day names in Ghana have varying spellings. This is so because of the various Akan subgroups. Each Akan subgroup has a similar or different spelling for the day name to other Akan subgroups. Yaa is spelt Yaa by the Akuapem, Akyem, Bono and Ashanti subgroups while Ga and Fante subgroups use the name Aba.

== Male version of Yaa ==
In the Akan culture and other local cultures in Ghana, day names come in pairs for males and females. The variant of the name used for a male child born on Thursday Kobina or Yaw.

== Notable people with the name ==
People with this name include:

- Yaa Asantewaa (c. 1840–1921), Ashanti queen mother and military rebel leader
- Yaa Avoe (born 1982), Ghanaian football defender
- Yaa Gyasi (born 1989), Ghanaian-American novelist
- Yaa Yaa (born 1990), Ghanaian singer-songwriter, recording artist and actress
- Maame Yaa Tiwaa Addo-Danquah (born 1969), Commandant of the Ghana Police Command and Staff College
- Phillippa Yaa de Villiers (born 1966), South African writer and performance artist

== See also ==
- Yaw (name)
