= Kwabena =

Akan masculine given name in Ghana

- Gender: Male

Origin
- Origin: Akan people
- Meaning: Tuesday born, ocean, friendliness
- Region of origin: Akan people

Other names
- Alternative spelling: Kabenla, Kobina, Komlá, Komlã, Komlan, Quabena, Abena, Bena
- Short forms: Bene, Cobe, Cobie, Coby, Ebo, Koby, Kobbi, Kobi,
- Related names: Kwadwo (Monday); Kwabena (Tuesday); Kwaku (Wednesday); Yaw (Thursday); Kofi (Friday); Kwame (Saturday); Akwasi (Sunday)

Kwabena is an Akan masculine given name among the Akan people (i.e. Ashanti, Akuapem, Akyem, Bono, Akwamu, Fante) in Ghana that means "born on a Tuesday" in Akan language, following their day naming system. People born on particular days are supposed to exhibit the characteristics or attributes and philosophy, associated with the days. In the case of Tuesday borns, they are associated with the ocean. Kwabena has the appellation Ogyam or Ebo meaning friendliness. Thus, males named Kwabena are supposed to be friendly.

== Origin and meaning ==
In the Akan culture, day names are known to be derived from deities. Kwabena originated from Koyabeneda and the Lord of Life's Land Day. Males named Kwabena are known to be brave and considered as manly "obarima". They tend to be very smart, nurturing and achieve a balance between strength and compassion "ogyam"(brave).

== Male variants ==
Day names in Ghana vary in spelling among the various Akan subgroups. The name is spelt Kwabena by the Akuapem, Bono, Akyem, and Ashanti subgroups while the Fante subgroup spell it as Kobina, Ebo and Kwamena.

== Female version ==
In the Akan culture and other local cultures in Ghana, day names come in pairs for males and females. The variant of the name used for a female child born on Tuesday is Abena.

== Notable people with the name ==
Most Ghanaian children have their cultural day names in combination with their English or Christian names. Some notable people with such names are:

- Kwabena Agouda (born 1985), Ghanaian football (soccer) striker
- Kwabena Bediako (born 1986), African-American chemist
- Kwabena Joetex Asamoah Frimpong, Ghanaian football (soccer) player
- Kwabena Darko, Ghanaian businessman and politician
- Kwabena Frimpong-Boateng, Ghanaian cardiovascular surgeon
- J. H. Kwabena Nketia (1921–2019), Ghanaian ethnomusicologist and composer
- Roi Kwabena (1956–2008), Trinidadian cultural anthropologist
- William Kwabena Tiero (born 1980), Ghanaian football player
- Kwabena Boahen, Ghanaian-American professor of bioengineering at Stanford University
- Dylan Kwabena Mills (born 1984), better known Dizzee Rascal, British grime and hip-hop artist
- Kwabena Adjepong (born 1990), better known Kwabs, British singer-songwriter

== See also ==
- Kobe (surname)
- Kobe (disambiguation), including people known by the mononym
- Coby, given name and surname
- Abena, female variant of the name Kwabena
