= Yaw (name) =

Male given name from the Akan people

- Gender: Male

Origin
- Origin: Akan people
- Meaning: born on a Thursday
- Region of origin: Akan people

Other names
- Related names: Kwadwo (Monday); Kwabena (Tuesday); Kwaku (Wednesday); Yaw (Thursday); Kofi (Friday); Kwame (Saturday); Akwasi (Sunday)

Yaw is a masculine given name originating from the Akan people and their day naming system, meaning "born on a Thursday" in Akan language, following their day naming system. People born on particular days are supposed to exhibit the characteristics or attributes and philosophy, associated with the days. Yaw has the appellation "Preko" or "Opereba" meaning brave.

== Origin and meaning of Yaw ==
In the Akan culture, day names are known to be derived from deities. Yaw originated from Yawoada the Day of Reproduction. Males named Yaw are known to be courageous and aggressive in a warlike manner (preko). They tend to be guarded, judgemental and appear to be ungrateful.

== Male variants of Yaw ==
Day names in Ghana vary in spelling among the various Akan subgroups. The name is spelt Yaw by the Akuapem, Ashanti, Bono, Akyem and Fante subgroups.

== Female version of Yaw ==
In the Akan culture and other local cultures in Ghana, day names come in pairs for males and females. The variant of the name used for a female child born on Thursday is Yaa.

== Notable people with the name ==
Most Ghanaian children have their cultural day names in combination with their English or Christian names. Some notable people with such names are:

- Yaw Antwi (born 1985), Ghanaian footballer playing in Serbia
- Yaw Amankwah Mireku (born 1979), Ghanaian footballer
- Yaw Asante (born 1991), Ghanaian footballer playing in Italy
- Yaw Berko (born 1980), Ghanaian footballer playing in Tanzania
- Yaw Fosu-Amoah (born 1981), South African long jumper
- Yaw Frimpong (born 1986), Ghanaian footballer playing in Congo
- Yaw Ihle Amankwah (born 1988), Ghanaian footballer playing in Norway
- Yaw Osafo-Marfo, (born 1942) Ghanaian politician and former minister for Education and Finance
- Yaw Preko (born 1974), Ghanaian former international footballer
- Yaw Tog (born 2003), Ghanaian rapper
- Eugene Yaw (born 1943), American politician
- Joachim Yaw (born 1973), Ghanaian former international footballer and Olympic medalist
- Lawrence Henry Yaw Ofosu-Appiah (1920–1990), Ghanaian academic and director of the Encyclopedia Africana
- Nicholas Yaw Boafo Adade (1927–2013), Ghanaian former supreme court judge
- Samuel Yaw Adusei, Ghanaian politician

== See also ==
- Rao (Chinese surname), sometimes transliterated as Yaw
