= Hakeem Belo-Osagie =

Nigerian businessman (born 1955)

- Born: 1955 (age 70–71); Lagos, Nigeria
- Occupation: Businessman
- Known for: Chair of Metis Capital Partners
- Spouse: Myma Belo-Osagie
- Children: Yasmin Belo-Osagie

Hakeem Belo-Osagie is a Nigerian businessman. He is chair of Metis Capital Partners an organisation focused on brokering and delivering attractive, large-ticket transactions in Africa to select blue chip international investment partners. He was listed by Forbes Magazine as the forty-first richest man in Africa in 2014.

Belo-Osagie and his wife, Dr Myma Belo-Osagie (a founding partner of Udo Udoma & Belo-Osagie), are philanthropists. The couple are also supporters of Harvard University's Center for African Studies, and Belo-Osagie has established a scholarship to support African students studying at Balliol College, Oxford.

Belo-Osagie and his wife are both members of Harvard University's Global Advisory Council. Belo-Osagie also serves on the Yale University President's Council on International Activities and the New York University President's Global Council. In addition, Belo-Osagie sits on the International Advisory Council of the Brookings Institution and the Global Board of Advisors of the Council on Foreign Relations.

Belo-Osagie and his wife are among the largest donors to the African Leadership Academy (the "ALA"), a residential secondary school in Johannesburg that works to educate Africa's brightest students. Founded in 2008, the selective ALA immerses promising young people in a rigorous two-year curriculum of leadership, service and African studies. The ALA network of alumni includes almost four hundred young leaders drawn from forty three countries across the continent. In 2012, the academy unveiled the "Hakeem and Myma Belo-Osagie Wing", named in recognition of the couple's support of the ALA and their advocacy on its behalf.

== Personal life and education ==
Belo-Osagie was born in Lagos, Nigeria in 1955. His father was a professional gynaecologist and his mother was a nurse. He is the father of Yasmin Belo-Osagie. He attended King's College in Lagos and completed his secondary education at the United World College of the Atlantic in Wales.

== Career ==
=== Oil industry ===
Belo-Osagie returned to Nigeria shortly after graduating from Harvard in 1980. He began his career in the service of the Federal Government of Nigeria working in various capacities in the energy sector ranging from Special Assistant to the Presidential Adviser on petroleum and energy, to Secretary of the Oil Policy Review and LNG Committees. He subsequently worked in the Petrochemicals Division of the Nigerian National Petroleum Corporation. He resigned his appointment in 1986 to set up CTIC, which became a leading energy consulting firm. He also chairs the board of Vitol Nigeria, which is a subsidiary of the Swiss-based Vitol Group, a multinational energy and commodity trading firm.

=== Telecommunications and other recent ventures ===
Belo-Osagie until recently, was the chairman of the board of directors of Emerging Markets Telecommunications Services Ltd, a mobile telephone operator which operates in Nigeria under the Etisalat brand. He is the ultimate beneficial owner of a significant stake in the company, which is operated as a joint venture with Mubadala Development Company and the Etisalat group.

Belo-Osagie is the chairman of and main shareholder in Duval Properties Limited, a real estate company currently engaged in developing a major new residential and commercial district at Jabi Lake in Abuja. He also chairs the board of Vitol Nigeria, which is a subsidiary of the Swiss-based Vitol Group, a multinational energy and commodity trading firm.

Belo-Osagie has also recently invested in Andela, which is developing a network of high quality computer science education programmes across the African continent. Andela operates a self-financing model of education: it funds the training of promising young programmers, and generates revenue by supplying its graduates' services to a range of global clients.

== Philanthropy ==
Hakeem Belo-Osagie and his wife have been major donors to the African Leadership Academy, a residential secondary school in Johannesburg founded in 2008. In 2012, the academy opened the “Hakeem and Myma Belo-Osagie Wing” in recognition of the couple’s financial support and advocacy for the institution.

The couple have recently established the "Hakeem and Myma Belo-Osagie Fund for the Promotion of Africa" at Yale University, and are supporters of Harvard University's Center for African Studies. Belo-Osagie has also endowed a fund to provide scholarships for African students studying at Balliol College, Oxford.

Belo-Osagie serves on the board of Alfanar, a charity which applies the principles of private sector investment to charitable giving to help build sustainable social enterprises throughout the Arab world. He also chairs the Nigerian National Committee for the United World Colleges, which assists the organisation's member colleges in identifying suitable candidates for their two-year International Baccalaureate scholarship programmes. Mr Belo-Osagie has also funded several scholarships to the United World Colleges.
