= Afua Kuma =

Ghanaian oral theologian (1908–1987)

- Born: 1908; Obo Kwahu
- Died: 1987 (aged 78–79)
- Occupation: Oral Theologian

Academic work
- Discipline: African theology, Feminist theology
- School or tradition: Methodist, Church of Pentecost, Catholic

Afua Kuma (1908–1987) was a Ghanaian oral theologian.

== Biography ==
Afua Kuma was born in Obo Kwahu in the Eastern Region of Ghana. In her childhood, she helped her parents in farming and trading and did not go to school. Although she was brought up in the Presbyterian church, where her father was an elder, in her later life she attended a local Catholic Church before joining the Church of Pentecost.

Though she was illiterate, she was well-versed in her mother tongue of Twi and became known for the oral theology in her prayers and songs.

== Works ==
- Kuma, Afua (1981). Jesus of the Deep Forest. Asempa Publishers. ISBN 978-9964-78-046-3.
