= Kwaku (disambiguation) =

Kwaku, alternatively Kweku, is an Ashanti given name to Ashanti male children born on Wednesday from the Ashanti people ethnic group.

Kwaku and Kweku may refer to:

== People ==
=== Kwaku ===
- Kwaku Alston, American photographer
- Kwaku Bediako (born 1986), Ghanaian fashion designer
- Kwaku Boateng (athlete) (born 1974), Canadian high jumper
- Kwaku Boateng (politician) (died 2006), cabinet minister in Ghana in the early 1960s
- Kwaku Dua I Panyin, or Barima Fredua Agyeman, (c. 1797–1867), eighth King of the Ashanti Empire from 1834 until death in 1867
- Kwaku Dua III Asamu or Prempeh I (1870–1931), thirteenth King of the Ashanti Empire from 1888 until his death in 1931
- Kwaku Fortune, Irish actor
- Kwaku Gyasi, Ghanaian gospel singer
- Kwaku Kwarteng (born 1969), Ghanaian civil engineer, economist, and politician
- Kwaku Sakyi-Addo, Ghanaian journalist
- Kwaku Sintim-Misa a.k.a. KSM (born 1956), Ghanaian actor, director, satirist, talk show host and author
- Quock Walker (1753-after 1781), also called Kwaku, American slave of Ghanaian descent
- Kwaku Walker Lewis (1798–1856), African-American abolitionist and active member of the Underground Railroad and the anti-slavery movement

=== Middle name ===
- B. Kwaku Duren (born 1943); a.k.a. Robert Donaldson Duren and Bob D. Duren, controversial African American lawyer, educator, writer, editor, Black Panther, long-time social, political and community activist
- Edward Kwaku Utuka, major general of the Ghana Armed Forces
- Manfo Kwaku Asiedu, suspect in the investigation into the 21 July 2005 London bombings
- Nana Kwaku Bonsam (born 1973), Ghanaian witch doctor and fetish priest
- Papa Kwaku Oppong (born 1987), Canadian basketball player
- Rebop Kwaku Baah, (1944–1983), Ghanaian percussionist best known for working with the 1970s rock groups Traffic and Can
- Thomas Kwaku Mensah (1935–2016), Roman Catholic archbishop of the Archdiocese of Kumasi, Ghana

=== Kweku ===
- Kweku Adoboli (born 1980), Ghanaian ex-trader known for his role in the 2011 UBS rogue trader scandal and convicted of fraud in 2012
- Chief Kweku Andoh (1836–1898), military officer in the British army and Regent of Edina State (1873-1898)
- Kweku Baako Jnr, Ghanaian journalist and editor
- Kweku Essien (born 1984), Ghanaian football (soccer) player
- Philip Quaque (1741–1816), birth name Kweku, first African ordained in the Church of England

== Literature ==
- Kwaku; or, the Man Who Could Not Keep His Mouth Shut, a 1982 novel by Guyanese writer Roy A. K. Heath
