= Abena =

Name list

- Gender: Female

Origin
- Origin: Akan people
- Meaning: born on a Tuesday
- Region of origin: Akan people

Other names
- Related names: Adwoa (Monday); Abena (Tuesday); Akua (Wednesday); Yaa (Thursday); Afia (Friday); Ama (Saturday); Akosua (Sunday)

Abena as a given name, is a female name of Ghanaian origin and means born on Tuesday. Day names are a cultural practice of the Akan people of Ghana. It is actually practised by all Akan (i.e. all the various Akan subgroups) people who follow traditional customs. People born on particular days are supposed to exhibit the characteristics or attributes and philosophy, associated with the days. Abena has the appellation Kosia or Nimo, meaning friendliness. Thus, females named Abena are supposed to be friendly. Another name is also called Abena, in the Indian culture. Abena is an Indian (Gujarati) surname; the Gujarati અબેના (Abēnā) possibly came from the Arabic name أبين (Abyan).

== Origin and meaning of Abena ==
In the Akan culture, day names are known to be derived from deities. Abena is originated from Koyabenada and from the Lord of Life's Land deity of the day Tuesday. Females born on Tuesday tend to be nurturing and achieve a balance between strength and compassion.

== Female variants of Abena ==
Day names in Ghana have varying spellings, because of the various Akan subgroups. Each Akan subgroup has a similar or different spelling for the day name to other Akan subgroups. The spelling Abena is used by the Akuapem, Ashanti, Akyem, Bono, and Fante subgroups.

== Male version of Abena ==
In the Akan culture and other local cultures in Ghana, day names come in pairs for males and females. The variant of the name used for a male child born on Tuesday is Kwabena.

== Notable people with surname Abena ==
- Martin Abena (born 1986), Cameroonian footballer
- Myenty Abena (born 1994), Surinamese footballer
- Ninon Abena (born 1994), Cameroonian footballer
- Richard Abena (born 1960), Cameroonian footballer

== Notable people with given name ==
- Abena Amoah, Ghanaian banker and financial advisor
- Abena Appiah (born 1993), Ghanaian-American singer, model, and beauty queen
- Abena Osei Asare (born 1979), Ghanaian politician
- Abena Brigidi, Ghanaian investment analyst author and speaker
- Abena Joan Brown (1928–2015), American businesswoman, theatre producer and arts patron
- Abena Busia (born 1953), Ghanaian writer and poet
- Abena Dugan, Ghanaian youth and gender advocate
- Abena Malika, Canadian actress, singer and DJ
- Abena Durowaa Mensah (born 1977), Ghanaian politician
- Abena Oduro (born 1959), Ghanaian economist
- Abena Oppong-Asare (born 1983), British politician
- Abena Osei-Poku (born 1971), Ghanaian business executive
- Abena Rockstar, Ghanaian rapper and songwriter
- Abena Takyiwa (born 1958), Ghanaian politician

== See also ==
- Kobe (surname)
- Kobe (disambiguation), including people known by the mononym
- Coby, given name and surname
- Kwabena, male variant of the name Abena
