= Myma Belo-Osagie =

Nigerian legal practitioner (born 1954)

Dr. Myma Belo-Osagie LL.B, BL, LL.M, SJD
- Born: 1954 (age 71–72)
- Education: University of Ghana; Nigerian Law School; Harvard Law School
- Occupation: Legal Practitioner
- Spouse: Hakeem Belo-Osagie
- Children: Yasmin Belo-Osagie
- Website: Udo Udoma & Belo-Osagie

Myma Adwowa Belo-Osagie (née Bentsi-Enchill), is a managing partner at Udo Udoma & Belo-Osagie law firm in Lagos, Nigeria. She is a graduate of the University of Ghana as well as the Harvard Law School.

She serves on the Global Advisory Council of the Office of President of Harvard University, and she is also a member of the Harvard University Center for African Studies Africa Advisory Board.

She was part of the team that drafted the Nigerian Communications Act of 2003, and was retained by the Government of Nigeria to assist in the drafting of downstream gas legislation.

== Education ==
Myma Belo-Osagie had her secondary school education at the prestigious Achimota School before graduating with a LL.B degree from the University of Ghana in 1975. She proceeded to the Ghana School of Law and was called to bar in 1977. She graduated from the Harvard Law School in 1978 with an LL.M degree and passed the Nigerian Law School exam in 1984 granting her the right to practice Nigeria as well as Ghana. She graduated from the Harvard Law School in 1985 with an SJD degree.

== Career ==
She started off her career as an Assistant at the Accra High Court Registry, Ghana in 1973. While on her doctoral program, she was a Research Assistant to the Head of International Legal Studies, Dean David Smith. In 1985, she founded the law firm Udo Udoma & Belo-Osagie.

She is a registered member of the New York, Ghana, and Nigeria Bars, and is also a member of the American Bar Association.

== Personal life ==
Myma Belo-Osagie is married to Hakeem Belo-Osagie and they have four children together including Yasmin Belo-Osagie. She is of Ghanaian descent.

== Awards and recognition ==
Belo-Osagie was elected an International Honorary Member of the American Academy of Arts and Sciences in April 2018.

The Harvard Business School's Africa Business Club and the Center for African Studies co-hosts the Hakeem & Myma Belo-Osagie Distinguished African Business and Entrepreneurship Lecture Series annually since 2015.
