= Yasmin Belo-Osagie =

Nigerian entrepreneur (born 1989)

- Born: 1989 (age 36–37); Boston, Massachusetts, U.S.
- Citizenship: American
- Education: Princeton University; Stanford Graduate School of Business; Harvard Law School
- Occupation: Entrepreneur
- Years active: 2014 - present
- Known for: Co-founding She Leads Africa
- Parents: Hakeem Belo-Osagie (father); Myma Belo-Osagie (mother)

Yasmin Belo-Osagie is co-founder of She Leads Africa, which she co-founded with Afua Osei. She is the daughter of Nigerian billionaire Hakeem Belo-Osagie and lawyer Myma Belo-Osagie.

== Early life and education ==
Belo-Osagie was born in Boston, Massachusetts, but grew up in Nigeria. She was a boarder in England before proceeding to Princeton where she graduated cum laude in History (major) and Finance (minor) in 2011. She attended Le Cordon Bleu (a hospitality education institution) in Paris and London.

She studied at Harvard Law School and at Stanford Graduate School of Business, graduating with a JD/MBA in 2019.

== Career ==
After she graduated from Princeton, Belo-Osagie worked with McKinsey & Company as a business analyst till 2013. While at McKinsey & Company, she met Afua Osei with whom she co-founded She Leads Africa.
She also had a short working career at the Mandarin Oriental in Hong Kong after her culinary education in Le Cordon Bleu.

== Personal life ==
She is the daughter of Hakeem Belo-Osagie and Myma Belo-Osagie

== Awards and recognition ==
In 2017, Belo-Osagie was listed among the Quartz Africa Innovators. She was also listed on the Religious and Humanitarian category of the 2017 Most Influential People of African Descent. She was listed among The 20 Youngest Power Women In Africa by Forbes in 2014.

In December 2016, She Leads Africa was invited to ring the closing bell at the New York Stock Exchange as the first African start-up to do so and Belo-Osagie rang the closing bell to join other Africans like Nelson Mandela, Kofi Annan and Nkosazana Zuma as those to have rung the closing bell of the NYSE.
