= Akan name =

The Akan people of Ghana, Ivory Coast, and Togo frequently name their children after the day of the week they were born and the order in which they were born. These "day names" have further meanings concerning the soul and character of the person. Middle names have considerably more variety and can refer to their birth order, twin status, or an ancestor's middle name.

This naming tradition is shared throughout Akan-speaking countries as well as the wider African diaspora. During the 18th–19th centuries, enslaved people in the Caribbean from the region that is modern-day Ghana were referred to as Coromantees. Many of the notable leaders of slave rebellions had "day names" including Cuffy, Cuffee or Kofi, Cudjoe or Kojo, Quao or Quaw, and Quamina or Kwame/Kwamina.

Most Ghanaians have at least one name from this system, even if they also have an English or Christian name. Notable figures with day names include Ghana's first president Kwame Nkrumah and former United Nations Secretary-General Kofi Annan.

In the official orthography of the Twi (Akan) language, the Ashanti versions of these names as spoken in Kumasi are as follows. The diacritics on ⟨á⟩, ⟨a̍⟩ and ⟨à⟩ represent high, mid, and low tone (tone does not need to be marked on every vowel), while the diacritic on ⟨a̩⟩ is used for vowel harmony and can be ignored. (Diacritics are frequently dropped in any case.) Variants of the names are used in other languages, or may represent different transliteration schemes. The variants mostly consist of different affixes (in Ashanti, kwa- or ko- for men and a- plus -a or -wa for women). For example, among the Fante, the prefixes are kwe-, kwa or ko for men and e-, a respectively. Akan d̩wo or jo (Fante) is pronounced something like English Joe, but there do appear to be two sets of names for those born on Monday.

== Day names ==
Day born	Ashanti		Variants		Root	Assoc.	Fante names
Day born	Male name	Female name		Ndyuka	Root	Assoc.	Fante names
Sunday (Kwasiada)	Kwasi	Akosua,	Kwasi, Siisi, Akwasi, Kosi; Akasi, Akosi, Akosiwa, Kwasiba, Awusi, Asi, Ese	Kwasi, Kwasiba	Asi	Universe	Kwesi, Quasheba, Esi, Siisi
Monday (Dwoada)	Kwadwo	Adwoa	Kodjó, Kojo, Kwadwo, Jojo, Cudjoe; Adjua, Ajwoba, Adwoba, Adjoa, Adjo, N'adjo, M'adjo, Adjowa, Ajao	Kodyo, Adyuba	Dwo	Peace	Cudjoe, Kojo, Joojo, Adjoa, Ajuba, Juba
Tuesday (Benada)	Kwabena,	Abena	Komlá, Komlã, Komlan, Kabenla, Kobby, Ebo, Kobi, Kobina; Ablá, Ablã, Abenaa, Araba, Abrema	Abeni	Bene	Ocean	Kobina, Abena, Ewurabena
Wednesday (Wukuada)	Kwaku	Akua	Kukuuwa, Kwaku	Koku, Kokou, Kwaku, Abeiku, Kaku, Kuuku, Kwaku; Akuba, Akú, Ekua	Wukuo	Spider (Sky)	Kweku, Abeiku, Yooku, Kukuuwa, Cooba
Thursday (Yahwada)	Yaw	Yaa	Yao, Yawo, Yawu, Yawa, Ayawa, Kwaw, Ekow, Kow; Yaa, Yaaba, Yaba, Aaba, Abina	Yaw, Yaba	Ya	Earth	Ekow, Quao, Aba, Yaaba, Baaba
Friday (Fiada)	Kofi	Afua	Fiifi, Yoofi; Afí, Afiba, Afia, Efua, Efe	Kofi, Afiba	Afi	Fertility	Fiifi, Yoofi Cuffee, Afiba, Fiba
Saturday (Memeneda)	Kwame	Amba, Ama	Kwami, Kuw-ame, Kw-ame, Kwamena, Kw-amina, Komi; Ame, Ami, Amba, Amma, Ameyo	Kwami, Amba	Amene	God	Kwamina, Ama

== Naming for twins ==
There are also special names for elder and younger twins.

The word Panyin means older/elder. Kakra is short for Kakraba, which means little/younger one. The definition/description below for the meaning of younger and an elder is backwards or vice versa.

Twin	Male name	Female name	Variants
Twin	Attá	Ataá	Atta
Firstborn ("elder" twin)	Atta Panyin	Attá Panyin	Panyin
Second born ("younger" twin)	Atta kakra	Kakra, Kakraba	Ataa
Born after twins	Tawia.		
Born after Tawia	Gaddo	Nyankómàgó	

== Birth-order names ==
There are also names based on the order of birth, the order born after twins, and the order born after remarriage.

Order	Male name	Female name
First born	Píèsíe	
Second born	Mǎnu	Máanu
Third born	Meńsã́	Mánsã
Fourth born	Anan, Anané	
Fifth born	Núm, Anúm	
Sixth born	Esĩã́	
Seventh born	Esuón	Nsṍwaa
Eighth born	Bótwe	
Ninth born	Ákron, Nkróma	Nkróma Nkrũmãh
Tenth born	Badú	Badúwaa
Eleventh born	Dúkũ	
Twelfth born	Dúnu	
Thirteenth born	Adusa	
Fourteenth born	Agyeman	
Last born	Kaakyire	

== Special delivery ==
Children are also given names when delivered under special circumstances.

Circumstance	Male/Female name	Translation
on the field	Efum	"The field"
on the road	Ɔkwán	"The road"
in war	Bekṍe, Bedíàkṍ	"war time"
happy circumstances	Afriyie/Afiríyie	"good year"
one who loves	Adofo	"the special one from God, warrior"
great one	Agyenim	"the great one from God"
after long childlessness	Nyamékyε	"gift from God"
premature or sickly	Nyaméama	"what God has given (no man can take away)"
forceful	Kumi	"forcefulness"
after death of father	Antó	"it didn't meet him"
father refuses responsibility	Obím̀pέ	"nobody wants"
father refuses responsibility	Yεmpέw	"we don't want you"

== Family names ==
Ashanti people given-names are concluded with a family name (surname) preceded by a given name. The family name (surname) are always given after close relatives and sometimes friends. Since Ashanti names are always given by the men, if a couple receives a son as their first born-baby then the son is named after the father of the husband and if the baby is a girl then she will be named after the mother of the husband. As a result, if the man is called Osei Kofi and his wife gives birth to a girl as their first born, the girl may be called Yaa Dufie even if she was not born on Friday. The reason is that the mother of the husband (Osei Kofi) is called Yaa Dufie. The Ashanti people usually give these names so that the names of close relatives be maintained in the families to show the love for their families.

In the olden days of Ashanti it was a disgrace if an Ashanti man was not able to name any child after his father and/or mother because that was the pride of every Ashanti household. Most of the ethnic-Ashanti family name (surname) given to boys could also be given to girls just by adding the letters "aa". Some Ashanti family names (surnames) can be given to both boys and girls without changing or adding anything. However, there are other ethnic-Ashanti family name (surnames) that are exclusively male names, while others are exclusively female names.

Ethnic-Ashanti family names (surnames)

#	Ethnic-Ashanti family name		#	Ethnic-Ashanti family name			#	Ethnic-Ashanti family name
1	Abeberese		84	Baafi			168	Mensah
2	Abeyie		85	Baah			169	Mintah
3	Aboagye		86	Bafuor			170	Misa
4	Aboah		87	Baffoe			171	Mmorosa
5	Aborah		88	Baako			172	Mpong
6	Aborampah		89	Baidoo			173	Munuo
7	Abrafi		90	Barwuah			174	Narh
8	Abrefa		91	Banahene			175	Nduom
9	Acheampong		92	Bediako			176	Nimo	Nimoh
10	Achamfour		93	Bekoe			177	Nkansa	Nkansah
11	Acquah		94	Bemah			178	Nkrumah
12	Adade		95	Boadi			179	Nsiah
13	Addai		96	Boadu			180	Nsonwah	Nsonwaa
14	Addo		97	Boahen			181	Nsor
15	Adiyiah		98	Boakye			182	Ntiamoa	Ntiamoah
16	Adomah		99	Boamah			183	Ntim
17	Adomako		100	Boampong			184	Ntow
18	Adusei		101	Boasiako			185	Nuako
19	Adwubi		102	Boateng			186	Nkruamah
20	Afoakwah		103	Boatei			187	Nyamekye
21	Afreh		104	Bonah			188	Nyantah
22	Afram		105	Bonsu			189	Nyantakyi
23	Afrane		106	Bonsra		Bonsrah	190	Nyarko
24	Afrakoma	Afrakomah	107	Brempong			191	Obeng	Oteng
25	Afrifa	Afirifa	108	Busia		Busiah	192	Obuor
26	Afriyie		109	Cofie	Cuffee	Kofi	193	Oduro
27	Afful		110	Crentsil			194	Ofori
28	Ahinful		111	Daako		Darko	195	Ofosu
29	Arkorful		112	Dankwah		Danquah	196	Ogyampah
30	Agyapong		113	Danso			197	Ohemeng
31	Agyare		114	Dapaa	Dapaah	Depay	198	Ohene
32	Agyei		115	Diawuo			199	Okese
33	Agyeman	Agyemang	116	Donkor	Donkoh	Dontoh	200	Okoromansah
34	Aidoo		117	Domfe			201	Okyere
35	Akenten	Akenteng	118	Dorkenoo			202	Omenah	Omenaa
36	Akomeah		119	Duah			203	Opambuor
37	Akomfrah		120	Dufie			204	Opare
38	Akosah		121	Duodu			205	Opoku
39	Akoto		122	Dwamena		Dwamenah	206	Oppong
40	Akuamoah		123	Dwomoh			207	Opuni
41	Akuffo		124	Ekuoba			208	Osafo
42	Akrofi		125	Enninful			209	Osam
43	Akyaw		126	Essien			210	Otuo
44	Amakye		127	Farkyi			211	Osei
45	Amamfo		128	Firikyi			212	Owoahene
46	Amankona	Amankonah	129	Fofie			213	Owusu
47	Amankwah		130	Fokuo			214	Oyiakwan
48	Ameyaw		131	Fordjour			215	Paintsil
49	Amissah		132	Forobuor			216	Pappoe
50	Amoabeng		133	Fredua		Freduah	217	Peprah
51	Amoah		134	Fremah			218	Pinaman
52	Amoako		135	Frimpong	Frempon	Frempong	219	Poku
53	Amoateng		136	Gyakari			220	Prempeh
54	Amofah		137	Gyan	Djan	Djansi	221	Quainoo
55	Ampadu		138	Gyamera		Gyamerah	222	Quansah
56	Ampem		139	Gyamah		Gyaama	223	Safo	Sarfo
57	Ampofo		140	Gyamfi			224	Sakyi
58	Amponsah		141	Gyambibi			225	Sarkodie
59	Amponsem		142	Gyasi			226	Sarpei	Yartei
60	Andoh		143	Gyeabuor			227	Sarpon	Sarpong
61	Ankobiah		144	Gyimah			228	Sasraku
62	Ankomah		145	Inkoom			229	Siabuor
63	Ankrah		146	Karikari			230	Siaw
147	Katakyie		231	Sika
65	Anokye		148	Kenu			232	Sikafuo
66	Ansah		149	Koduah			233	Sintim
67	Apori Antwi		150	Kokote			234	Siriboe
68	Apau		151	Konadu			235	Soadwa	Soadwah
69	Appiah		152	Koranten		Koranteng	236	Sowah
70	Asamoah		153	Korsah			237	Tagoe
71	Asante	Asantewaa	154	Kouassi			238	Takyi
72	Asare		155	Kufuor		Kuffour	239	Tandoh
73	Asenso		156	Kumankama			240	Tawiah
74	Ashia		157	Kusi		Kusiwaa	241	Tuffour
			158		Kwantwi			Tutu
75	Asiamah		159	Kwaata			242	Twasam
76	Asiedu		160	Kwakye			243	Tweneboa	Tweneboah
77	Asomadu		161	Kwateng		Kwarteng	244	Twerefuo
77	Asomaning		162	Kwayie			245	Twum	Twumasi
79	Asubonteng		163	Kyekyeku			247	Wiafe	Wiredu
	Assumin	Assuming		Kyem
80	Ayeh		164	Kyereme			248	Yamoah
81	Ayensu		165	Kyerematen		Kyeremateng	249	Yankah
82	Ayew		166	Kyerewa		Kesewaa	250	Yeboah
83	Awuah		167	Mansong			251	Yiadom		-

== Additional references ==
- J. E. Redden and N. Owusu (1963, 1995). Twi Basic Course. Foreign Service Institute (Hippocrene reprint).ISBN 0-7818-0394-2
- Florence Abena Dolphyne (1996). A Comprehensive Course in Twi (Asante) for the Non-Twi Learner. Accra: Ghana Universities Press. ISBN 9964302452
- Akan Teleteaching course
- Aukan Library (Ndyuka)

== See also ==
- Ghanaian name
