= Dambou =

Food from Niger

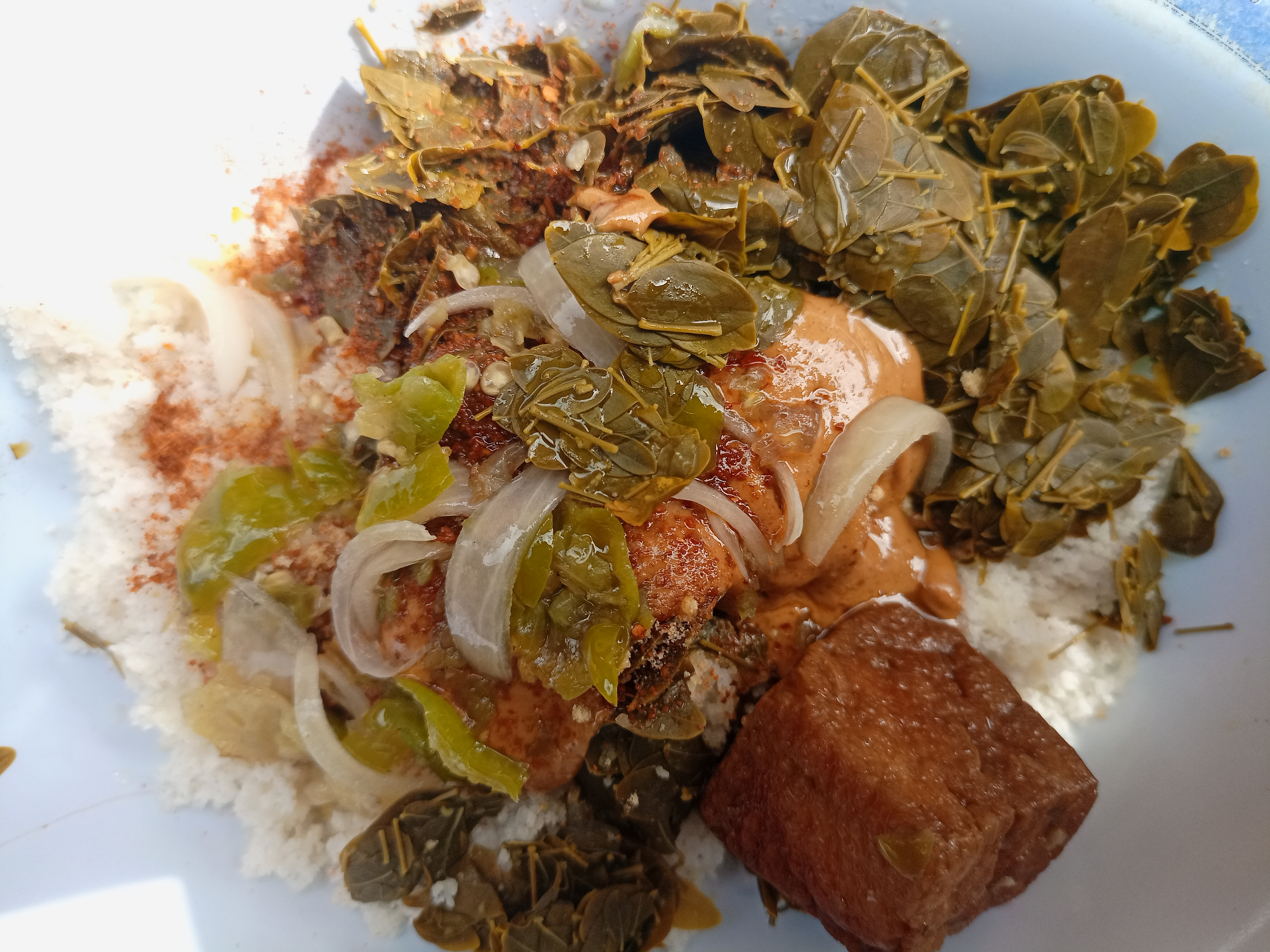
- Dambou
- Alternative names: Dambu
- Place of origin: Niger
- Created by: Zarma people, Songhai people
- Main ingredients: Usually rice flour or millet, wheat or corn couscous, moringa leaves, peanut, meat or fish

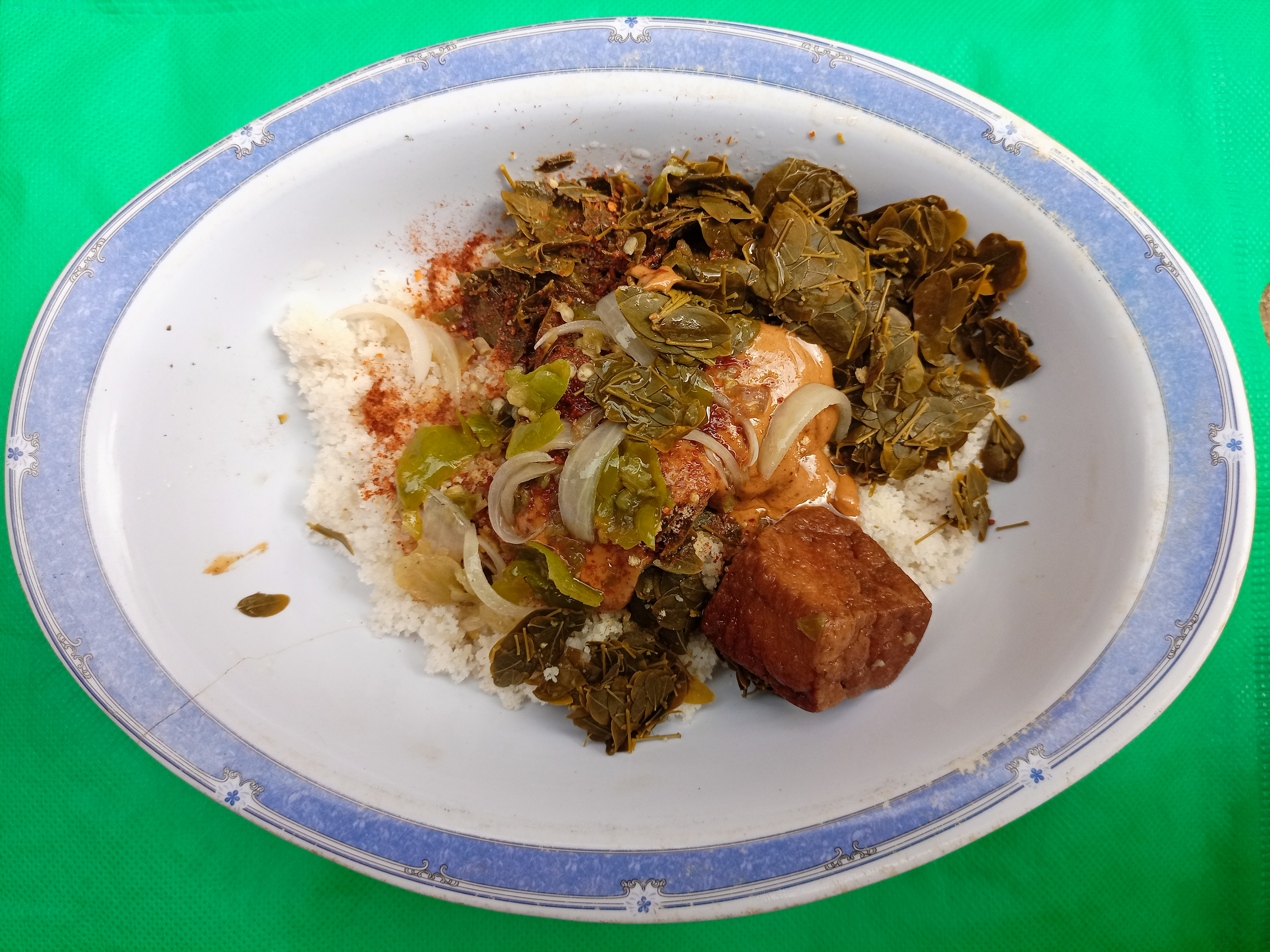

Dambu or dambou is a dish native to the Zarma and Songhai of Southwestern Niger made from cereals and moringa. It is consumed at any time but mainly during festive occasions such as outdoorings and weddings. This dish is also common among the Dendi people of North Benin and other West African cities. It is also common in the Zongo settlements where the Songhai and Zarma travel.

== Ingredients ==
(from a French version of the dish)

1. Fine wheat semolina or couscous
2. Spinach (or moringa leaves)
3. Onion
4. Aji dulce capsicum (or similar, like the sweet Martinique pepper or Grenada seasoning chile), or substitute green bell pepper (optional)
5. Salt
6. Stock cubes
7. Cooking oil

== Preparation ==
Dambou is prepared according to the desire and will of the cook. For a simple dish, cooks mostly use either rice flour or fine hard wheat semolina (couscous semolina) or millet, wheat or corn couscous. The cereals is steamed for about 20 to 30 minutes and added the already boiled moringa leaves. Finally, the other ingredients are added in their raw state: onion, chili, salt, broth, peanut, vegetable oil, meat or fish as a side dish.
