= Cuffee =

Anglicized Akan name found as both a first and surname in African-American culture

Cuffee Cuffey Coffey
- Current region: United States and Jamaica
- Etymology: Kofi (born on Friday)
- Origin: Ashanti; Empire of Ashanti

Cuffee, Cuffey, or Coffey is a first name and surname recorded in African-American culture, believed to be derived from the Akan language name Kofi, meaning "born on a Friday". This was noted as one of the most common male names of West African origin which was retained by some American slaves.

== Racist connotation ==
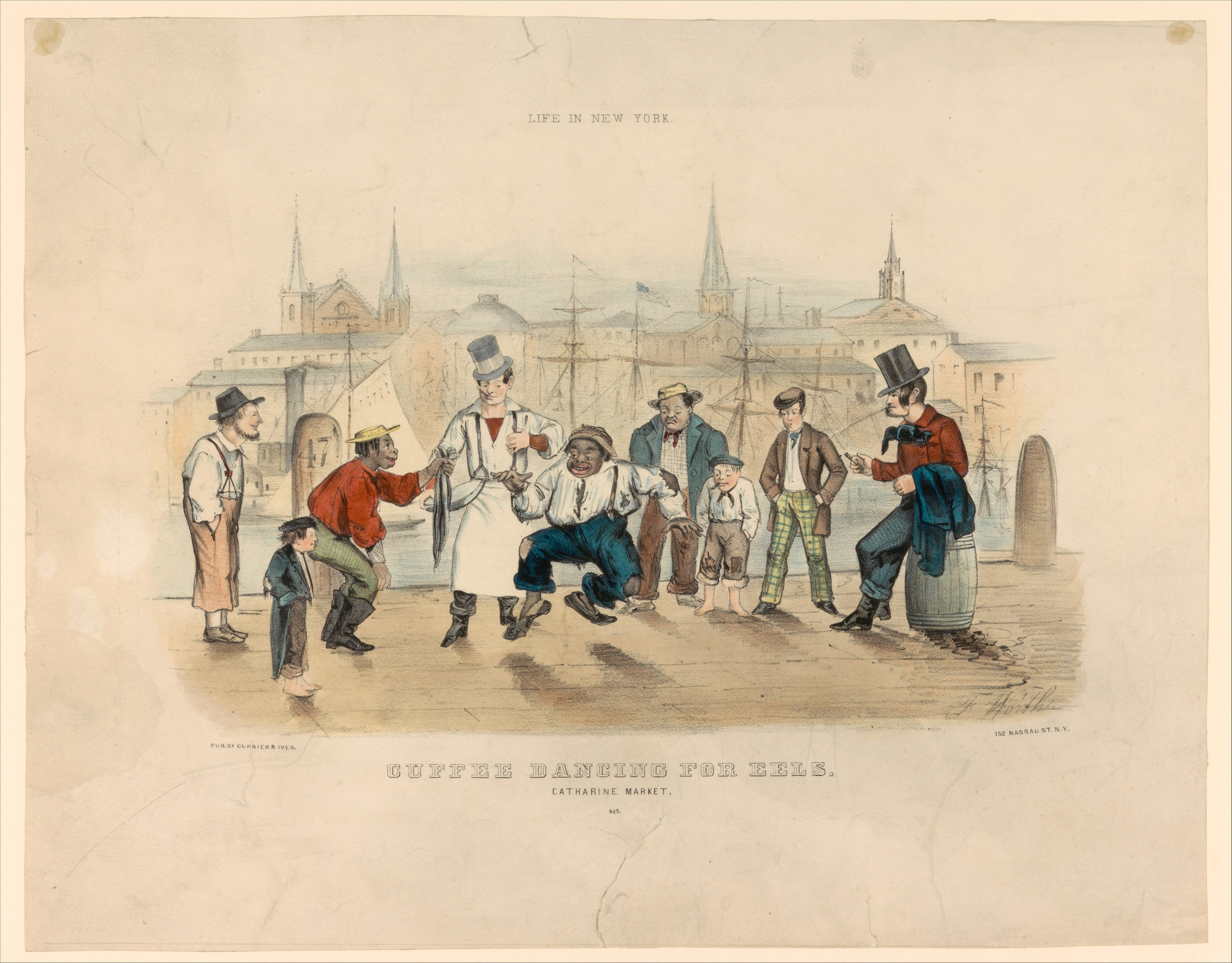
A racist depiction of a scene in the Catherine market of New York titled; "Cuffee dancing for eels" (1857).

The name was used in the United States as a derogatory term to refer to Black people. For example, Jefferson Davis, then a US Senator from Mississippi who later became the President of the Confederate States, said that the discussion of slavery in the Dred Scott v. Sandford case was merely a question of "whether Cuffee should be kept in his normal condition or not."

== Notable people ==
=== Guyana ===
- Coffij, leader of the 18th century Berbice Rebellion in Guyana.

=== Jamaica ===
- Cuffee, a maroon who waged a slave rebellion against plantation owners in Jamaica in the early 1800s.

=== United Kingdom ===
- William Cuffay (1788–1870), Chartist leader, the son of a former slave.

=== United States ===
- Cuffee Mayo (1802-1896), minister, laborer, and politician in North Carolina.
- Ed Cuffee (1902–1959), a jazz musician born in Norfolk, Virginia who moved to New York City in 1920 to pursue his career as a jazz trombonist.
- Paul Cuffee (1759–1817), a Massachusetts freeman and shipping magnate. Cuffee rejected the surname of his former owner, Slocum, and replaced it with his father's Akan name.
- Paul Cuffee (missionary) (1757–1812), Native American (Shinnecock) Christian minister, missionary, and preacher.
- James Cuffey (1911–1999), American astronomer
- Robert Cuffey (d. 1960), American singer, member of The Five Sharps

== See also ==
- Cuffey, fictional character from North and South
- John Coffey, fictional character from The Green Mile
- Quander family, oldest documented African-American family in the United States whose surname is of Fante origin.
- 2334 Cuffey, minor planet
