= Akua Asabea Ayisi =

Ghanaian journalist and High Court judge (1927–2010)

High Court Judge

Personal details
- Born: Akua Asabea Ayisi; 3 April 1927 Mampong Akuapem, Ghana
- Died: 21 April 2010 (aged 82–83)
- Relatives: Tetteh Quarshie, Akosua Tuntum Nahana
- Education: Newnham College, University of Cambridge
- Occupation: Lawyer and journalist
- Known for: First female journalist and High Court Judge in Ghana

Akua Asabea Ayisi (3 April 1927 – 21 April 2010) was a feminist, a former High Court Judge and one of the first female Ghanaian journalist. During the rise of the Ghanaian independence movement, Akua Asabea Ayisi was trained as a journalist with Mabel Dove-Danquah and Kwame Nkrumah, who later became the country's first prime minister and president.

Ayisi's position as editor of the women's column, which focused on women's issues, in the Accra Evening News newspaper was considered as radical action at that time.

== Family and early life ==
Akua Asabea Ayisi was born on 3 April 1927, in Akuapim-Mampong. She was the eighth child of 10 children born to Mercy Adebra Mensah and Okyeame Kofi Ayisi.

Kofi Ayisi was a royal and linguist for the King, who was also his relative. Some of Akua Asabea Ayisi's uncles were royal fetish priests. Kofi Ayisi had 70 children; 10 of those were Mercy Adebra. Ayisi's mother's grandfather, Tetteh Quarshie, planted the first cocoa tree in Ghana. Mercy Adebra, an determined woman who wanted to be independent, eventually left Kofi Ayisi and moved to Accra to be close to her family, who were Gas. [2].

Akua Asabea Ayisi attended primary school at Presbyterian Primary in Mampong and subsequently the Presbyterian Girls School in Osu, (Accra). She then went to the Government Secretarial School to complete her education. In those days, it was rare for a woman to receive such a high level of education. However, her mother strongly believed in women's education.

== Career and activism ==
After joining the Convention People's Party (CPP), led by Kwame Nkrumah, Ayisi became the first female journalist recorded in Ghana (1948). Though Mabel Dove had been a working as a journalist under pseudonyms since the 1930s. She worked alongside Nkrumah on the Accra Evening News, a daily newspaper established by the former president in 1948, and wrote political pamphlets that demanded independence and mobilized the Ghanaian people to oppose colonial rule. She edited the women's column on the front page of the newspaper – a section introduced by Nkrumah as part of his aim to elevate women in Ghana via expanding the educational provision of girls. The launching of the Accra Evening News on 6 March 1949 coincided with Nkrumah's removal from the office of the General Secretary of the United Gold Coast Convention (UGCC) Party. Through the newspaper, Nkrumah wanted to fight for "full self-government, not in the shortest possible time, but now." Having created several newspapers and publications during his time as a student activist, Nkrumah considered the press a key instrument for education and political mobilization.

In August 1948, along with Kofi Baako, editor of Cape Coast Daily Mail, and Saki Scheck, editor of the Takoradi Times, Ayisi embarked on country-wide lecture tours, promoting resistance against imperialist rule. She later became Kwame Nkrumah's first private secretary (1950–56) and helped Nkrumah write pro-independence slogans to combat British imperial rule, such as "die with the imperialists".

She took part in a series of political protests dubbed "Positive Action campaign" and was subsequently arrested and imprisoned for her involvement. The protests included strikes that called for a boycott of foreign businesses, which encouraged several rebellions throughout the Gold Coast colony.

Ayisi is considered to have played a key role in the formulation and implementation of Nkrumah's cultural policies.

Shortly after independence, Ayisi went to Newnham College at the University of Cambridge, where she studied history, matriculating in 1959. She was called to the Bar at Lincoln's Inn in 1963. From 1963 to 1964, she is recorded by Newnham College records as working at the Paris-Sorbonne University.

Subsequently, returning to Ghana, Ayisi began work as a barrister, and would ultimately become a High Court Judge. Due to her apolitical occupation, she was not harmed when the military overthrew Kwame Nkrumah's government.

In 1968, she took part in the constitutional assembly responsible for writing the new constitution following Kwame Nkrumah's overthrow in 1966.

In 1969, Ayisi was one of the first women to run for parliament, doing so in the Akuapem North District, and ultimately lost. In 1978, she helped draft the new constitution instituted by General Akuffo, when Ghana changed from Supreme Military Council (SMC) to democratic rule.

Akua Asabea Ayisi died on 21 April 2010.
