= Koffi =

Koffi is a surname and masculine given name. It may refer to:

== Surname ==
- Abdoulaye Koffi (born 1991), Ivorian footballer
- Alain Koffi (born 1983), French basketball player
- Andaman Koffi (born 1985), Ivorian footballer
- Antoine Koffi (born 1999), Italian rugby union player
- Christian Koffi (born 1990), Ivorian footballer
- Christian Koffi (footballer, born 2000), French footballer
- Enzo Koffi (born 2006), French footballer
- Erwin Koffi (born 1995), French footballer
- Hervé Koffi (born 1996), Burkinabe football goalkeeper
- Jean-Christophe Koffi (born 1998), Ivorian footballer
- Jean Romaric Kevin Koffi (born 1986), Ivorian footballer
- Léon Konan Koffi (1928–2017), Ivorian politician, Interior Minister of the Ivory Coast
- Mechac Koffi (born 1988), Ivorian footballer
- Mohamed Koffi (born 1986), Ivorian-born Burkinabé footballer
- Nadège Koffi (born 1989), Ivorian former footballer
- N'Dri Philippe Koffi (born 2002), Ivorian footballer
- Olié Koffi (born 1984), Ivorian footballer
- Patrick Koffi (born 2001), American soccer player

== Given name ==
- Koffi C. Akakpo, Togolese academic administrator
- Koffi Boua (born 1986), Ivorian footballer
- Koffi Dakoi (born 1999), Ivorian footballer
- Koffi Djidji (born 1992), French footballer
- Koffi Nicolas Dognon (born 1989), Niger-born, Beninese retired footballer
- Koffi Gahou (1947–2019), Beninese artist, actor and director
- Koffi Gueli (born 1993), Togolese footballer
- Koffi Kouamé (born 1995), Ivorian footballer
- Koffi Kouao (born 1998), Ivorian footballer
- Koffi Kwahulé (born 1956), Ivorian novelist and playwright
- Koffi Idowu Nuel (born 1977), stage name Koffi, Nigerian comedian, musician and actor
- Koffi Olympio (born 1975), Togolese former footballer
- Koffi Panou (1947–2003), Togolese politician and diplomat
- Koffi Sama (born 1944), Prime Minister of Togo 2002 to 2005

== Stage name ==
- Koffi, Nigerian comedian, musician and actor Koffi Idowu Nuel (born 1977)
- Koffi Olomide, Antoine Christophe Agbepa Mumba (born 1956), Congolese Soukus singer, dancer, producer and composer

== See also ==
- Kofi (disambiguation)
