= Afua Osei =

American entrepreneur

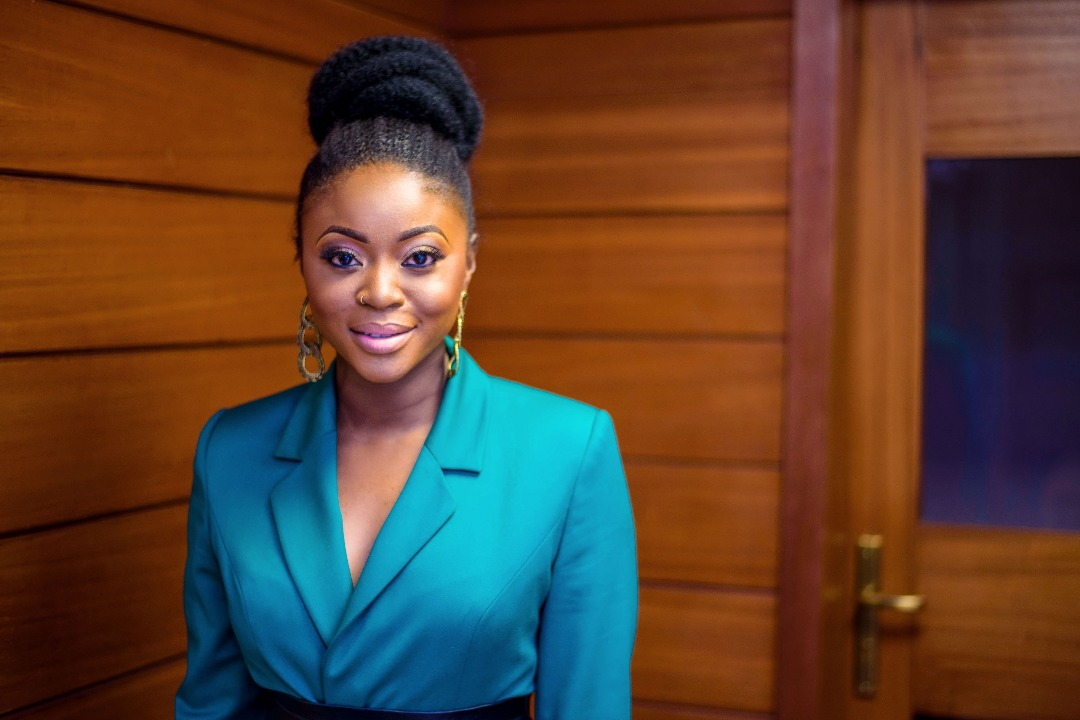
- Born: Washington, DC
- Education: Allegheny College; University of Chicago Booth School of Business; Harris School of Public Policy Studies
- Occupation: Entrepreneur
- Years active: 2014–present
- Known for: co-founding She Leads Africa

Afua Osei is an entrepreneur, investor and public speaker who co-founded She Leads Africa, a media company for millennial African women.

== Early life and education ==
Born in Washington, DC, Osei spent her formative years in Prince George's County, Maryland. Osei graduated cum laude from Allegheny College with degrees in Political Science and was the first student to design their own major in Black Studies. She was awarded the Ray Smock Political Science Award for showing promise in municipal and state politics as well as the Faculty Prize for the Best Interdisciplinary Senior Thesis.

In 2013, she graduated from the University of Chicago Booth School of Business and Harris School of Public Policy Studies with a Master of Business Administration and Master of Public Policy.

== Career ==
After graduating from college, Osei was a Fulbright Scholar in Malaysia and also served in the Office of First Lady Michelle Obama. After business school, Osei moved to Lagos, Nigeria to serve as a management consultant at McKinsey & Company providing strategy and operations expertise to clients in South Africa, Nigeria, Ghana and the United States.

In 2014, Osei co-founded She Leads Africa, a "community for smart ambitious young African women," with Yasmin Belo-Osagie. She Leads Africa provides women across more than 35 countries with business and career advice and has been featured in several international publications including The Financial Times, CNN, CNBC Africa, Huffington Post, and Black Enterprise. On December 9, 2016, She Leads Africa rang the Closing Bell at the New York Stock Exchange.

In her personal business, Afua teaches digital entrepreneurship and coaches people on how to use networking to scale their business.

== Awards and recognition ==
Osei has been recognized by Forbes Africa as one of the youngest power women in Africa (2014), named by Ventures Africa as one of the top 25 African innovators to watch in 2016 and one of the 30 Quartz Africa innovators in 2017. She was selected as a judge for the Chivas Venture competition, "a global search to find and empower the next generation of young entrepreneurs determined to succeed while changing the world for the better."

She has been a featured speaker at TEDxEuston in London, G20 Africa Partnership Conference in Germany, Essence Festival Durban in South Africa, and Thomson Reuters Foundation Trust Conference in the UK.
