= Afia Salam =

Pakistani journalist

- Education: University of Karachi
- Occupation: Journalist

Afia Salam is a Pakistani journalist and a media development specialist by profession. She is known for being the first female cricket journalist in Pakistan. She has also remained a member of Pakistan's first batch of air traffic controllers and a member of The Coalition For Women In Journalism (CFWIJ).

== Education ==
A resident of Karachi, Afia Salam completed her High School in 1970 at St. Judes, Karachi. She completed her master's degree in geography in 1982 from University of Karachi.

== Career ==
Salam is a journalist with over four decades of experience in print, electronic and web media.

Salam started her career in 1978 in the field of journalism by writing weekly columns in English and Urdu, becoming the first female cricket journalist. During her master's degree, she ventured into the field of journalism in 1978, tempted by the renewal of Pakistan-India cricketing relations after a break of 13 years. The India national cricket team came to Pakistan under the captaincy of Bishan Singh Bedi after 13 years. Using her passion for cricket and journalism, Salam took the role of a cricket journalist and became the only woman sports journalist of Pakistan. The Pakistan-India match was her first assignment, after which she started covering other sports areas and soon became a sports journalist. From 1996 to 1999 she became the editor of Pakistan's only English Cricket magazine, The Cricketer.

in 1983, Salam decided to apply for induction into the Civil Aviation Training Institute in Hyderabad where she was trained as an air traffic controller and became the first member of Pakistan's female Air Traffic Controllers. She later went on to edit a magazine on Aviation and Defense called The Wings.

Later, Salam moved on to a related field of advertising. She became a Creative Head and the Director of Special Projects of three advertising agencies Argus, Blazon and Blitz –DDB. She stayed on the position for 15 years. She was an editor in Pakistan's first energy sector magazine, Energy Update. She has also worked at Dawn News as a senior copy editor, Head of culture and content in charge of its flagship morning show.

She has since worked as an editor and senior journalist at multiple magazines namely: The Star, Dawn News, Tribune, Newsline, The News, Pique, and Aurora. She has also contributed to the Indian newspaper The Wire. Salam is a freelance journalist and also a senior journalist at CFWIJ.

Salam is a chairperson at Indus Earth Trust. She has also worked at IUCN as head of its education, communication and outreach unit.

== Social activism ==
Salam is also an activist who has advocated women's rights, media ethics, countering climate change, and many other social issues of Pakistan. She is part of many different NGO's where she works to address climate change and its effects.

The organization Bolo Bhi is one such platform where Salam has worked as media and outreach consultant. Salam was involved with the organization in fighting for the lifting of YouTube ban by the Pakistani government.

She is a part of CFWIJ, an organization that works to promote women in journalism industry.

Salam has worked along with CFWIJ to organize training sessions that address issues for women in journalism and encourage their participation in the media industry.

She has also written articles for many newspapers on topics such as climate change, gender equality, labor rights and media ethics. She also trains media on these topics.

During the 2010 floods and 2011 Badin cloudbursts, Salam served as Sindh coordinator of the Imran Khan foundation to provide relief, rehabilitation and reconstruction activities for communities affected by the floods.

Salam is currently working as a part of the project implementation team for Indus Earth Trust, Water for Women, program. She is in the working group arranged by the IUCN and the Government for the establishment of Marine Protected Areas, of which the success was the declaration of Astola Island in Balochistan.
