= Abena Rockstar =

Ghanaian musical artist

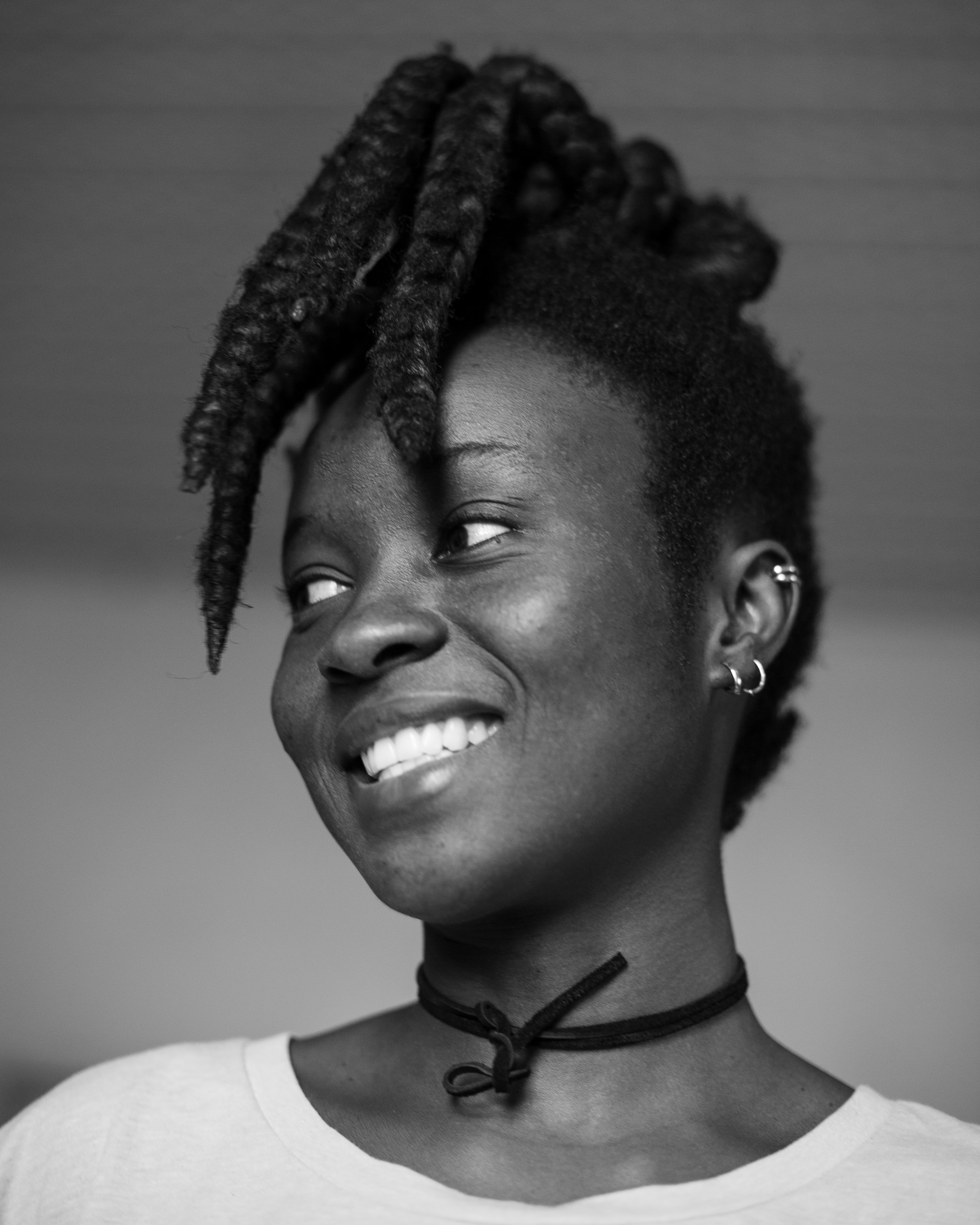
- Portrait of Abena Rockstar

Background information
- Born: Bernice Bediako; Kumasi, Ghana
- Genre: Hip hop
- Occupations: Rapper; songwriter
- Years active: 2014–present
- Label: Independent
- Website: abenarockstar.com

Bernice Bediako Poku, known professionally as Abena Rockstar, is a Ghanaian rapper and songwriter from Kumasi.

== Music career ==
In 2014, she recorded a music project named ‘Only Few Can Relate,’ which she simultaneously released in April 2017 with her ‘May All Fears inside Abort’ EP. Abena is associated with cutting edges lyrics about life and the realities of living.

In September 2017, her eponymous single, ‘Abena’, was selected for study at the Department of African Studies at Howard University in the USA. At the start of 2018, a Swedish television station, Sveriges Television featured Abena Rockstar in their documentary about Ghanaian hiphop.

Abena Rockstar released her debut album, the Harvest Season LP, in March 2019.

Abena Rockstar has performed on the stage of the Chale Wote Street Art Festival in Ghana in 2017. Abena performed at Asa Baako Festival in Busia in the Western Region (Ghana).

== Discography ==
Studio albums
Year	Title	Details
2017	Only Few Can Relate	Release date: April 12, 2017; Format: Digital download
2019	Harvest Season	Release date: February 28, 2019; Format: Digital download
2020	Harvest Season	Release date: June 23, 2020; Label: Bernice Bediako; Format: Digital download

Extended Plays
Year	Title	Details
2017	M.A.F.I.A.	Release date: April 14, 2017; Format: Digital download

Singles
Year	Title	Details
2017	"Abena Abena"	Release date: April 3, 2017; Format: Digital download
2018	Advice Freestyle (cover of Fa so hor by Sarkodie)	Release Date: November 22, 2018; Format: Digital download
2018	More Fire Freestyle (cover of still by Dr. Dre)	Release date: November 22, 2018; Format: Digital download

Collaborations
Year	Title	Details
2019	"Kokonsa" [Kojo Trip feat. Abena Rockstar & Yung Pabi]	Release date: March 22, 2019; Format: Digital Download; Album: Life's a Trip
2021	"The Fall (Chok Small Baako)" [Kay-Ara feat. Abena Rockstar, AmaaRae & Omosede Eholor]	Release date: April 30, 2021; Label: Neo Spirituals; Format: Digital download; Album: For Those in the Middle
