= Kwesi Sinclair =

Guyanese-born British Virgin Islands cricketer (born 1978)

Personal information
- Full name: Kwesi Lee Sinclair
- Born: 26 October 1978 (age 48); Guyana
- Batting: Right-handed

Domestic team information
- Years: Team
- 2007/08: British Virgin Islands

Career statistics
Competition	Twenty20
Matches	1
Runs scored	9
Batting average	9.00
100s/50s	–/–
Top score	9
Balls bowled	–
Wickets	–
Bowling average	–
5 wickets in innings	–
10 wickets in match	–
Best bowling	–
Catches/stumpings	–/–
- Source: Cricinfo, 13 January 2013

Kwesi Lee Sinclair (born 26 October 1978) is a Guyanese-born former British Virgin Islands cricketer. Sinclair was a right-handed batsman.

In February 2008, the British Virgin Islands were invited to take part in the 2008 Stanford 20/20, whose matches held official Twenty20 status. Sinclair made a single appearance in the tournament against Dominica in a preliminary round defeat, with Sinclair being dismissed for 9 runs by Liam Sebastien.
