= Kwaku =

Male given name among the Akan and Ewe

- Gender: Male

Origin
- Origin: Akan people, Ewe people
- Meaning: born on a Wednesday
- Region of origin: Akan people, Ewe people, Ghana

Other names
- Related names: Kwadwo (Monday); Kwabena (Tuesday); Kwaku (Wednesday); Yaw (Thursday); Kofi (Friday); Kwame (Saturday); Akwasi (Sunday)

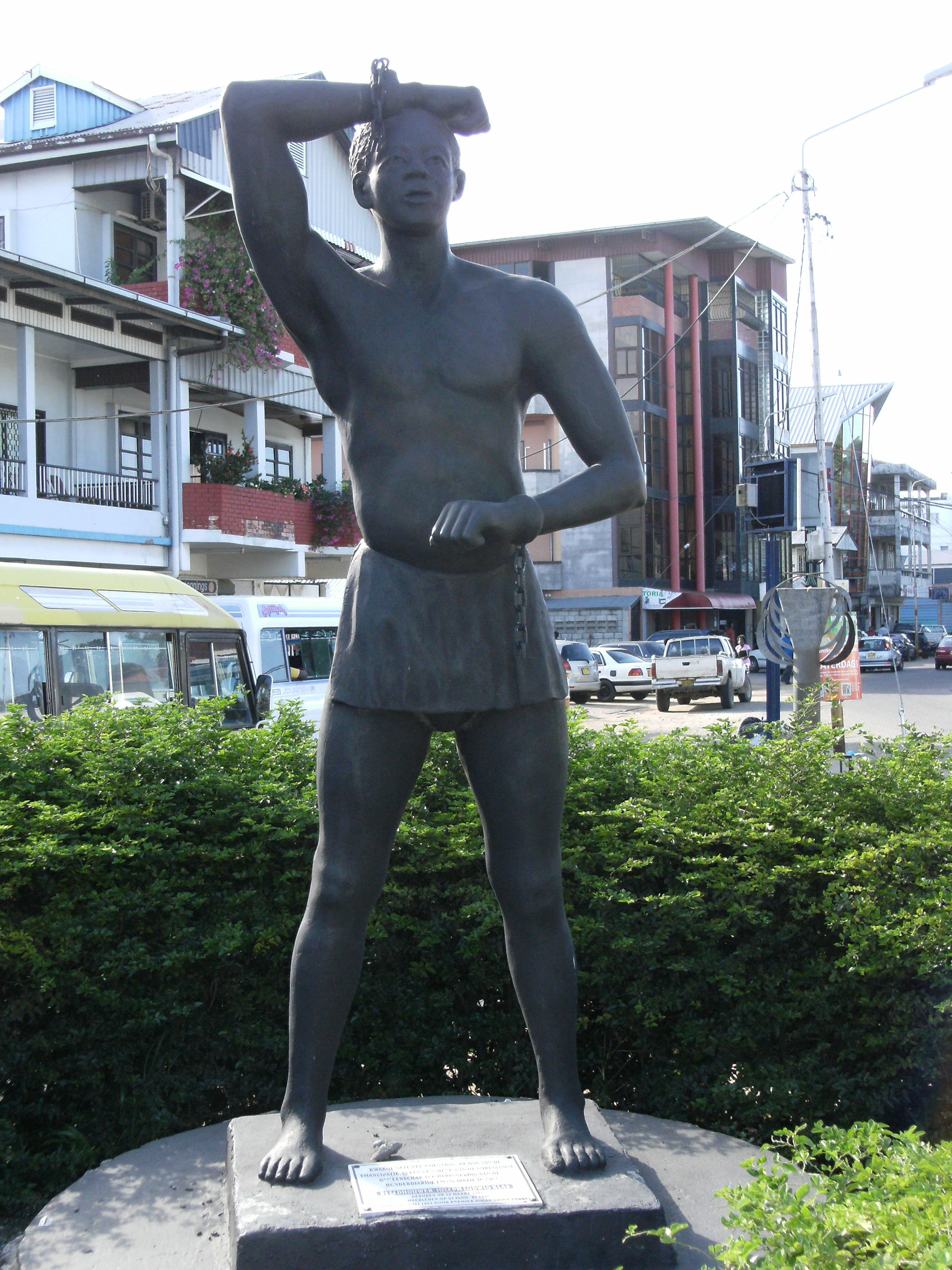
Kwaku statue in Paramaribo, representing a freed slave whose chains are cut.

Kwaku (Kweku, Kuuku, Korku, Kɔku, Kouakou), is an Akan given name for male children born on Wednesday to the Akan and Ewe ethnic groups. Akan birthday names are associated with appellations that give an indication of the character of people born on such days. Typical appellations for Kwaku are Atobi, Daaku or Bonsam meaning stubborn.

== Origin and meaning of Kwaku ==
In the Akan culture, day names are known to be derived from deities. Kwaku originated from Wukuada and the Lord of Life's Sky (heavenly) Host deity of the day Wednesday. Males named Kwaku can be mean-spirited and tenacious.

== Male variants of Kwaku ==
Day names in Ghana vary in spelling among the various Akan subgroups. The name is spelled Kwaku by the Akuapem, Akyem, Bono, Akwamu and Ashanti subgroups while the Fante subgroup spell it as Kweku.

== Female version of Kwaku ==
In the Akan culture and other local cultures in Ghana, day names come in pairs for males and females. The variant of the name used for a female child born on Wednesday is Akua.

== Notable people with the name Kwaku ==
Most Ghanaian children have their cultural day names in combination with their English or Christian names. Some notable people with such names are:

- Kwaku Boateng (born 1995), Canadian high-jumper
- (Francis) Kwaku Sakyi Addo, Ghanaian radio journalist
- Kwaku Alston American photographer
- Kwaku Manu (born 1984), Ghanaian actor
- Kwaku Sintim Misa (born 1956), Ghanaian actor
- Kwaku Duah (d. 1867), eighth king of the Ashanti Kingdom
- Kwaku Karikari (born 2002), Ghanaian footballer
- Anthony "Rebop" Kwaku Baah (1944–1983), Ghanaian percussionist
- Kwaku, Antiguan and Barbudan national hero

== See also ==
- Ketikoti
