= Adwoa =

- Pronunciation: [adʑᶣoa]
- Gender: Female
- Language: Akan languages

Origin
- Origin: Akan
- Derivation: dwo 'peace'
- Meaning: born on a Monday;
- Region of origin: Akan people

Other names
- Variant forms: Adjoa, Adjua, Adjuba, Juba
- Related names: Adwoa (Monday); Abena (Tuesday); Akua (Wednesday); Yaa (Thursday); Afua (Friday); Ama (Saturday); Akosua (Sunday)

Adwoa is a given name used for women born on Monday in Western Africa, particularly Ghana and some parts of Togo, southern Benin and Ivory Coast. Day names are a cultural practice of the Akan people of Ghana and the Ivory Coast. It is actually practiced by all Akan (i.e. all the various Akan subgroups) people who follow traditional customs. People born on particular days are supposed to exhibit the characteristics or attributes and philosophy, associated with the days. Adwoa has the appellation Badwo or Akoto meaning peace. Thus, females named Adwoa are supposed to be peaceful.

== Origin and meaning of Adwoa ==
In the Akan culture, day names are known to be derived from deities. Adwoa is originated from Koyayuda and from the Lord of Life Firmament deity of the day Monday. Females born on Monday are known to be calm, peacemakers and protectors. They tend to be nurturing and achieve a balance between strength and compassion.

== Female variants of Adwoa ==
Day names in Ghana have varying spellings. This is so because of the various Akan subgroups. Each Akan subgroup has a similar or different spelling for the day name to other Akan subgroups. Adwoa is spelt Adwoa by the Akuapem, Akwamu, Akyem, Bono and Ashanti subgroups while the Fante subgroup spell it as Adjoa, Ajua, or Ajuba.

== Male version of Adwoa ==
In the Akan culture and other local cultures in Ghana, day names come in pairs for males and females. The variant of the name used for a male child born on Monday Kwadwo.

== Notable women named Adwoa ==
Most Ghanaian children have their cultural names in combination with their English or Christian names. Some notable people with such names are:

- Adwoa Aboah (born 1992), British model and activist
- Adjoa Andoh (born 1963), British actress
- Adwoa Smart (born 1971), Ghanaian actress
- Adjoa Bayor (born 1979), Ghanaian footballer
- Adwoa Yamoah (born 1986), Canadian cheerleader
