= Obo Kwahu =

- Country: Ghana
- Region: Eastern Region (Ghana)

Obo Kwahu is a town in the Eastern Region of Ghana. It is believed that the people of Obo first made settlement at Oboobo which is near Kwahu Bepong today. They moved from "Oboobo" to a near site which was named "Obo" from "Oboobo". The present Obo Kwahu is now the most beautiful in the whole Kwahu District and that is why the building at the outskirts are all attractive-looking.

The town is well known for its beauty and grand Easter festival. The area is popularly known as is popularly called "Small London". The seat of the Kwahu Chief is located in OBO.The Kwahu Ridge Secondary Technical School is an institution located in that area. The school is a second cycle institution.
