= Paul Cuffee (missionary) =

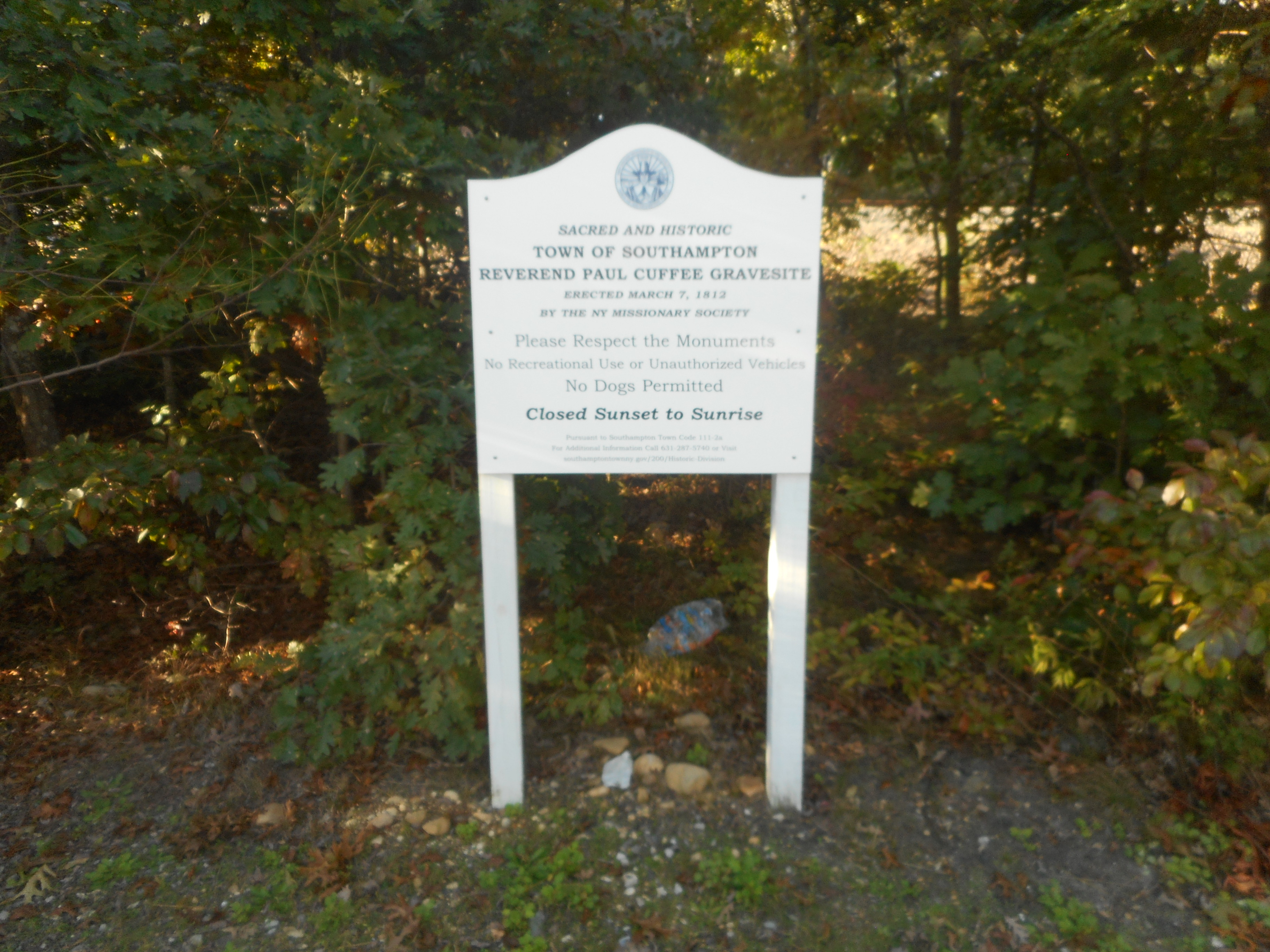
Sign at the small parking lot of the grave of Rev. Paul Cuffee in Hampton Bays, NY

Paul Cuffee (1757 – March 7, 1812) was a Christian minister, missionary, and preacher. A Native American of the Shinnecock tribe, Cuffee became a Christian and was baptized as a young adult. He was ordained as a ministry of the Presbyterian Church in his late twenties and began to work as a missionary for New York Missionary Society among the Native peoples of Long Island, New York, where he worked for the survival of the local tribes, and became known as powerful preacher and a strong advocate for the Native peoples of Long Island, to whom he became known as "Priest Paul." He also was a tireless advocate of his people among the non-Native majority. He also spoke against slavery and was mentioned in Harriet Beecher Stowe's novel, Uncle Tom's Cabin.

Cuffee was particularly active with the Native communities in the areas of Hampton Bays and Montauk, and with his own Shinnecock community, establishing prayer meeting grounds where members of the Native communities could meet safely, engage in discussion, and practice spirituality. To this day, his own Shinnecock tribe still gathers for prayer at their ceremonial "June Meeting." His grave marker, erected by the New York Missionary Society, can still be found on Shinnecock tribal land in the Hampton Bays area. It reads, "In memory of the Rev. Paul Cuffee, an Indian of the Shinnecock tribe, who was employed by the Society for the last thirteen years of his life, on the eastern part of Long Island, where he labored with fidelity and success. Humble, pious and indefatigable in testifying the gospel of the grace of God, he finished his course with joy on the 7th of March, 1812, aged 55 years and 3 days.”
