= Kwadwo Osseo-Asare =

Ghanaian materials scientist

Kwadwo Asare Osseo-Asare
- Born: Accra, Ghana
- Education: University of California, Berkeley; Achimota School
- Scientific career
- Workplaces: Pennsylvania State University
- Thesis: Ammonia hydrometallurgy : thermodynamics of dissolution and adsorption phenomena in oxide systems (1975)
- Doctoral students: Virgínia Ciminelli

Kwadwo Osseo-Asare is a Ghanaian materials scientist who is Distinguished Professor of Materials Science and Engineering at the Pennsylvania State University. He was awarded the American Institute of Mining, Metallurgical, and Petroleum Engineers Gold Medal in 1997. He was elected a member of the National Academy of Engineering in 2004 for contributions to the fundamental understanding of interfacial phenomena in leaching and solvent extraction.

== Early life and education ==
Osseo-Asare studied at the Achimota School in Ghana. He was awarded an African Scholarship Program for American Universities (ASPAU) scholarship to move to the United States to attend university, and joined the University of California, Berkeley. Here he specialised in materials science, and completed his master's research on the wetting behaviour of silver iodide. He stayed at University of California, Berkeley for his doctoral research, where he worked on hydrometallurgy with Douglas Fuerstenau. Immediately after graduating, Osseo-Asare was appointed to the technical staff at Amax Engineering, where he worked on extraction and refinement of nickel and cobalt.

== Research and career ==
In 1976 Osseo-Asare joined the faculty at Pennsylvania State University. Whilst he had originally planned to return to Ghana and establish an academic career there, he was convinced by Fuerstenau and Frank Aplan to stay in academic research, and was recruited by Penn State. Osseo-Asare works on aqueous processing, materials synthesis and self-assembly.

In 1997 Osseo-Asare was awarded the American Institute of Mining, Metallurgical, and Petroleum Engineers (AIME) James Douglas Gold Medal “for his contributions to the fundamental understanding of interfacial phenomena in leaching, solvent extraction, and particle synthesis,”. He was listed in Who's Who. For his research on hydrometallurgy, he was awarded the Pennsylvania State University Faculty Scholar Award in 1999. Osseo-Asare spent 2000 as a visiting professor in the Massachusetts Institute of Technology Martin Luther King Jr. program.

Alongside his role in the United States, Osseo-Asare is a visiting professor at the University of Ghana. As part of this role, Osseo-Asare travels to and from Ghana. During a lecture at Ashesi University, Osseo-Asare encouraged the engineering students to, “break the rules. I guarantee you that every time you solve a problem arriving from the African context you’re solving a problem that is of interest to the rest of the world. Once you solve that local problem, you gain a solution for the whole world,”. He has explained that in Africa it is tempting for students to assume technological advances all come from abroad. He spent 2008 on a sabbatical in Ghana, where he designed and taught a course on materials of the future. Here he incorporated African proverbs into his materials science curriculum, such as “Ogya ne atuduro nna faako - Fire and gunpowder do not sleep together,”. Osseo-Asare was inducted into the Brazilian Academy of Sciences in 2016.

== Select publications ==
- Arriagada, F. J.; Osseo-Asare, K. (1999-03-15). "Synthesis of Nanosize Silica in a Nonionic Water-in-Oil Microemulsion: Effects of the Water/Surfactant Molar Ratio and Ammonia Concentration". Journal of Colloid and Interface Science. 211 (2): 210–220. Bibcode:1999JCIS..211..210A. doi:10.1006/jcis.1998.5985. ISSN 0021-9797. PMID 10049537.
- Osseo-Asare, K.; Arriagada, F. J. (1990-01-01). "Preparation of SiO2 nanoparticles in a non-ionic reverse micellar system". Colloids and Surfaces. 50: 321–339. doi:10.1016/0166-6622(90)80273-7. ISSN 0166-6622.
- Arriagada, F. J.; Osseo-Asare, K. (1995-03-01). "Synthesis of Nanosize Silica in Aerosol OT Reverse Microemulsions". Journal of Colloid and Interface Science. 170 (1): 8–17. Bibcode:1995JCIS..170....8A. doi:10.1006/jcis.1995.1064. ISSN 0021-9797.
- Osseo-Asare, K. (2011). Aqueous processing of materials : an introduction to unit processes with applications to hydrometallurgy, materials processing, and environmental systems. London: Academic. ISBN 978-0-12-529350-1. OCLC 751829480.

== Personal life ==
Osseo-Asare is married to Fran Osseo-Assare, who he met as a student at the University of California, Berkeley.
