= Olié Koffi =

Ivorian footballer

Koffi Olie
Personal information
- Full name: Olié Koffi Kan Tobie
- Date of birth: 7 June 1984 (age 42)
- Place of birth: Sincody, Ivory Coast
- Height: 1.86 m (6 ft 1 in)
- Position: Striker

Youth career
- ES Bingerville

Senior career*
Years	Team	Apps	(Gls)
2004–2006	ES Bingerville	67	(35)
2007–2008	S.O.A.	15	(7)
2007	Club Africain	0	(0)
2008	Africa Sports	34	(21)
2009	Zamalek	9	(2)
2009–2010	S.O.A.	28	(16)
2010–2011	AS Salé	21	(12)
2011	Darnes	16	(8)
2011–2013	Africa Sports	30	(16)
2013–2014	Hassania Agadir	18	(10)
- * Club domestic league appearances and goals

Olié Koffi Kan Tobie (born 7 June 1984) is an Ivorian footballer who last played Moroccan side Hassania Agadir.

== Career ==
Olie won with Africa Sports 2008 the Côte d'Ivoire Premier Division. He scored 21 goals in 34 games for Africa Sports and signed in January 2009 for Société Omnisports de l'Armée, for which he scored five goals in the first eight games.
