= Kwesi Wilson =

Ghanaian artist manager (died 2019)

Willie Roy
- Born: Kwesi Wilson
- Occupations: Artiste Manager, Music Producer
- Years active: 1998 - 2019
- Notable work: Sunny Ade, Fela Kuti, Shatta Wale

Kwesi Wilson (death 10 February 2019) also known as Willie Roy, Willy Roy, Willi Roy was a Ghanaian entertainment critic, a musician, songwriter, a multi-Instrumentalist and a sound engineer.

== Career ==
He is known for his work with Femi Kuti, King Sunny Adé, Sonny Okosun and Daddy Lumba and an Artiste and Repertoire Manager for Zylofon Media.
