= Kwasi Buokrom =

- Country: Ghana
- Region: Brong Ahafo Region

Kwasi Buokrom is a town in the Brong Ahafo Region of Ghana. The town is known for the Our Lady of Providence Secondary School. The school is a second cycle institution.
