= Accra Evening News =

The Accra Evening News was a daily newspaper established in the Gold Coast (now Ghana) in 1948 by Kwame Nkrumah. The paper's appearance marked the foundation of the press in the country as a powerful means to mobilize people, and was followed by publication of the Morning Telegraph of Sekondi appeared in January 1949, and then the Daily Mail of Cape Coast.

== History ==
The first edition of the Accra Evening News appeared as a one-sheet paper on 3 September 1948, when Nkrumah was dismissed from his post as General Secretary of the United Gold Coast Convention.

As C. L. R. James wrote:

The Evening News sold all copies it could print. It was besieged by news vendors, and the editors of those days claimed that if they had had the facilities to print they would have sold 50,000 copies a day in Accra, a town of 150,000 people, of whom a large proportion was illiterate. Copies were passed from hand to hand. This was the way Nkrumah mobilized the people of the Gold Coast against British imperialism. This was the birth of African freedom.

The paper became a mouthpiece for the Convention People's Party until it was banned the following year by the colonial government.
