= Ama (given name) =

Name list

- Gender: Female

Origin
- Origin: Akan people
- Meaning: born on a Saturday
- Region of origin: Akan people

Other names
- Related names: Kwame: Adwoa (Monday); Abena (Tuesday); Akua (Wednesday); Yaa (Thursday); Afua (Friday); Ám̀a (Saturday); Akosua (Sunday)

Ama is an Akan feminine given name originating from the Akan people following their day naming system, meaning "born on Saturday". Day names are a cultural practice of the Akan people of Ghana. It is practised by all the subgroups of the Akan people (i.e. Ashanti, Akwamu, Akuapem, Bono, Akyem, Fante) who follow traditional customs. People born on particular days are supposed to exhibit the characteristics or attributes and philosophy, associated with the days. Ama has the appellation "Nyamewa" or "Adoma" meaning creation or grace.

== Origin and meaning of Ama ==
In the Akan culture, day names are known to be derived from deities. Ama is originated from Koyame the Akan Day name of God. Females born on Saturday tend to be talented, wise and problem solvers.

== Female variants of Ama ==
The Akan people in Ghana have so many ways of calling or naming their female child born on Saturday. For instance, the Fantes call a female child born on Saturday Ewurama, Ama or Amba.

== Male version of Ama ==
In the Akan culture and other local cultures in Ghana, day names come in pairs for males and females. The variant of the name used for a male child born on Saturday is Kwame.

== Notable people with the name ==
Most Ghanaian children have their cultural day names in combination with their English or Christian names. Some notable people with such names are:

- Ama Benyiwa Doe (1950–2021), Ghanaian politician
- Ama Agbeze (born 1982)
- Ama K. Abebrese (born 1980)
- Ama Quiambao (1947–2013), Filipino actress
- Nana Ama McBrown (born 1977) - Actress, TV show hostess, Business Woman and Music composer.

== See also ==
- Kwame
