= Akosua =

Given name among the Akan people

- Gender: Female

Origin
- Origin: Akan people
- Meaning: born on a Sunday
- Region of origin: Akan people

Other names
- Related names: Adwoa (Monday); Abena (Tuesday); Akua (Wednesday); Yaa (Thursday); Afia (Friday); Ama (Saturday)

Akosua is an Akan given name to a female child born on Sunday (Kwasiada). It is mostly practised by all Akan (i.e Ashanti, Akuapem, Akyem, Akwamu, Bono, Fante) people who follow traditional customs. People born on particular days are supposed to exhibit the characteristics or attributes and philosophy, associated with the days. Akosua has the appellation Dampo meaning agility. Thus, females named Akosua are supposed to be agile.

== Origin and meaning ==
In the Akan culture, day names are known to be derived from deities. Akosua is originated from Koyasi and from the Lord of Life Descent deity of the day Sunday. Females born on Sunday are known to be leaders in society or "clearer of the way" (obue-akwan). They are very inquisitive and tend to be pulled into a thing of interest.

== Female variants ==
Day names in Ghana have varying spellings. This is so because of the various Akan subgroups. Each Akan subgroup has a similar or different spelling for the day name to other Akan subgroups. Akosua is spelt Akosua by the Akuapem, Akyem, Akwamu, Bono and Ashanti subgroups while the Fante subgroup spell it as Esi.

== Male version ==
In the Akan culture and other local cultures in Ghana, day names come in pairs for males and females. The variant of the name used for a male child born on Sunday is Kwasi or Akwasi.

== Notable people with the name ==
Most Ghanaian children have their cultural day names in combination with their English or Christian names. Some notable people with such names are:

- Akosua Addai Amoo (born 1990), Ghanaian sports journalist
- Akosua Busia (born 1966), Ghanaian actress, film director, author and songwriter
- Akosua Serwaa (born 1981), Ghanaian middle-distance runner
- Akosua Frema Osei Opare (born 1947), Ghanaian politician
- Rebecca "Becca" Akosua Acheampomaa Acheampong (born 1984), Ghanaian singer, songwriter, and actress
- Akosua Adoma Owusu (born 1984), Ghanaian-American filmmaker and producer
- Akosua Adomako Ampofo, Ghanaian academic
- Akosua Agyapong (born 1959), Ghanaian female highlife singer

== See also ==
- Akwasi
