= Afua Bruce =

Data executive, engineer

- Education: Purdue University, BS; University of Michigan, MBA
- Occupations: Software engineer, Government administrator
- Years active: 2008 - Present
- Known for: Government digital services

Afua Bruce is an American engineer, data executive, professor, and former U.S. government official who has held appointments at the Federal Bureau of Investigation, White House Office of Science and Technology Policy, and on President Joe Biden’s transition agency review team at the Department of Justice. In 2021, a statue was erected in Bruce's honor in Dallas, Texas by the American Association for Advancement of Science. Bruce is a public interest technologist.

== Education ==
Bruce received a Bachelor of Science in Computer Engineering from Purdue University and an MBA from the University of Michigan. At Purdue, Bruce was one of two recipients of the BP Amoco merit-based scholarship.

== Career ==
Bruce began her career as a software engineer at IBM. She then joined the FBI where she served in various strategy and program management roles.

In 2015, she was appointed to the Office of Science and Technology Policy at the White House as the Executive Director of the National Science and Technology Council where she led over 100 different Federal inter-agency working groups across topics that included: environment, and sustainability, homeland and national security, science, technology, and STEM education.

Bruce then became the first Director of Engineering and a Fellow in the newly formed Public Interest Technology program at New America. In this program, Bruce oversaw the Public Interest Technology University Network, and worked with technologists working with state and local government, and NGOs, to develop technology and policy.

In February 2020, it was announced that Bruce would be the new Chief Program Officer at DataKind. Bruce also holds a faculty position at Carnegie Mellon University. Bruce was among 29 people named to Joseph R. Biden, Jr.'s agency review team for the Department of Justice in November 2020.

In 2020, Bruce gave a Ted Talk on Tech Equity and Serving the Community.

Bruce is the co-author of the 2022 book, The Tech That Comes Next, a non-fiction analysis of how technology can play a role in an equitable world.

== Honors ==
Bruce was named an American Association for Advancement of Science If/Then Ambassador in recognition of her work to interest girls in STEM careers and featured in the If/Then Statue Exhibit.
