= Kwesi Slay =

- Born: Bernard Appiah; 10 June 1990 (age 35); Tema, Ghana
- Genres: Hip hop,
- Occupations: Rapper, Singer
- Instrument: Vocals
- Years active: 2015-present

Bernard Appiah (born 10 June 1990), known by his stage name Kwesi Slay, is a Ghanaian hip hop recording artist and entertainer. He is from Ashaiman-Tema. Kwesi Slay is known for his 2018 single 'Seven'.

== Career ==
Slay began to gain mainstream recognition when he released his first single "3y3 normal" featuring Yaa Pono in 2015. He released “Street Ways” and” Wedi Bet” in 2017. On July 8, 2018, Kwesi's first EP Aben, was released. In December 2018, Slay released his fourth single, ”Follow Me”, featuring VGMA's high life artist of the year Kuami Eugene.

== Awards and nominations ==
=== Muse Africa Awards ===
Year	Recipient	Category	Result	Ref.
Muse Africa Awards 2018	Kwesi Slay	INTROLUDE OF THE QUARTER	Won	
Muse Africa Awards 2018	Kwesi Slay	”Hip-Hop Song of the Quarter	Won	

=== 3 Music Awards ===
Year	Recipient	Category	Result	Ref.
3 Music Awards 2019	Kwesi Slay	Next Rated Act Of The Year”	Nominated	
