= Virgínia Ciminelli =

Brazilian metallurgist (born 1954)

Virgínia Sampaio Teixeira Ciminelli (born 1954) is a Brazilian metallurgist specializing in extractive metallurgy, the recovery of metals from metal-containing materials, including hydrometallurgy, electrometallurgy, sustainability in metal extraction, and the restoration of water quality in water returned to the environment from mining. She is a professor at the Federal University of Minas Gerais, in the Department of Metallurgical and Materials Engineering.

== Education and career ==
Ciminelli is originally from Belo Horizonte, where she was born in 1954. She was an undergraduate at the Federal University of Minas Gerais, where she graduated in 1976 and continued for a master's degree in 1981. She went to Pennsylvania State University in the US for doctoral study, and completed her Ph.D. in 1987. Her dissertation, Oxidation of Pyrite in Alkaline Solutions and Heterogeneous Equilibria of Sulfur and Arsenic-Containing Minerals In Cyanide Solutions, was supervised by Ghanaian materials scientist Kwadwo Osseo-Asare.

She has been a professor at the Federal University of Minas Gerais since 1977, and a full professor since 1995, when she became the first female full professor in the university's school of engineering. She has been a level 1A researcher of the National Council for Scientific and Technological Development (CNPq) since 2001.

== Recognition ==
Ciminelli is a member of the Brazilian Academy of Sciences, elected in 2009 as the first woman in the engineering section. She was elected to the Brazilian National Academy of Engineering in 2013. In 2014, she was elected as a foreign associate of the US National Academy of Engineering, "for contributions in environmental hydrometallurgy, and for leadership in national and international technical collaborations". She became the fourth Brazilian associate of the National Academy of Engineering.

She received the Commander's Cross and Grand Cross of the National Order of Scientific Merit in 2010 and 2018 respectively. The Minas Gerais Society of Engineering named her as engineer of the year in 2021.
