= Fiifi =

Fiifi is a Ghanaian masculine name that may be given to a male child whose typical day of birth falls on Friday. "Fiifi" is typically given to male child in the Fanti tribe. Each tribe in Ghana have a way to name Friday male child. Example. "Kofi" is for the Ashanti tribe, "Azuma" for the Frafra tribe in the Northern part of Ghana etc.

- Fiifi Adinkra (born 1987), Ghanaian blogger and publicist
- Fiifi Aidoo (born 1996), Ghanaian-Finnish basketball player
- Fiifi Fiavi Kwetey (born 1967), Ghanaian politician
