= Ghanaian name =

Ghanaian names (or personal names in Ghana) consist of several given names and surnames based on the language of ethnic groups in Ghana: including Akan, Dagomba, Ga Adangbe, Ewe and Nzema. Frequently, children are given a "day name" which corresponds to the day in the week when they were born. These day names have further meanings concerning the soul and character of the person. Middle names have considerably more variety and can refer to their birth order, twin status, or an ancestor's middle name. These names are also used among Ghanaians living abroad and among Africans living in the diaspora who wish to identify with their ancestral homeland. During the 18th and 19th centuries, the enslaved people from modern day Ghana in the Caribbean were referred to as Coromantees. Most day names among the Mole-Dagombas are usually given to girls, and few are given to both sexes.

Most Ghanaians have at least one name from this system, even if they also have an Arabic or western name. Notable figures with day names include Ghana's first president Kwame Nkrumah, former United Nations Secretary General Kofi Annan, and actress Adjoa Andoh.

Day Names (Kra Din / Soul Names) In Ghanaian tradition, we normally say Day Name which is Kra Din which translates to Soul Day. The term Kra Din stems from the belief that a person’s soul receives a specific trait of someone as well as the spiritual direction and its all dependent on the day of the week the person is born on. The popular names are the Akans, Asantes and the Akuapem people, however, naming systems cuts across other ethnic groups with localized variations.

Birth Order, Twins, and Circumstantial Names: Aside the birth day, a child’s name outrightly denotes their position among their siblings or at times the detailed conditions surrounding their birth. Birth Order in Akan and Ga Examples can be found below:

- First Born is named Baako for both Male and Female and in Ga, Dede is given to the first-born female.
- The third born is named Mensah and Mansa for Male and Female, respectively.
- For the eight born, they are normally named Awotwe.
- Tenth borns are also named Badu and Baduwaa for male and female, respectively.

Circumstantial and Defensive Names Often that not, some names are given to children based on the circumstances. In the sense that if a family has suffered instant loss, they may give a child a very “defensive” name which locally its mentioned “saman din” to ward of bad spirits. Some of the names are “Bediako” which means born into struggle. However, there are times where names are giving to children to express gratitude not only in times of trouble. For example; Nyamewaa which means God’s Gift or Mawuli, a Ewe name which means God exists.

Ancestral Surnames and Clan Lineages When it comes to surnames in Ghana, it is very important because it is an anchor of an individual within a specific family tree, lineage, or traditional title:

- Paternal and Maternal Lineage: In patrilineal groups in the Ga, Ewe and Mole-Dagbon ethnicity, surnames transcend from father to child. Among matrilineal Akan groups, children traditionally inherit names passed down from their father’s spirit, while with regards to land and family assets, it passed through the mother’s clan.
- Praise Names (Mmran): Surnames are often linked to praises or traditional proverbs, for example, the surname Osei, carries the praise title Osei Bonsu but not all surnames have that.

Religious and Modern Adaptations Ancestral Surnames slowly begun to fade away when Ghana entered the colonial era and through missionary activities. Christianity and Islam was introduced by the Western People; English and Portuguese as well as Arabic Names. Today, most Ghanaians Use a Combination of all three. For example:

- Christian/ Western + Day Name + Surname = Emmanuella Efua Quaynor
- Islamic + Traditional/Day Name + Surname = Ibrahim Kwaku Baako.

In modern urban settings, it is increasingly common for families to use the father's ancestral name as a fixed family surname for all children, mirroring international conventions.

Diaspora Legacy and Global Impact When it comes to naming conventions in ghana, we have a global reach. The journey of how we got there can be found below:

- The Transatlantic Slave Trade and Coromantees: So in the 18th and 19th Centuries, Gold Coast enslaved people who were taken to the Caribbean and America were referred to as Coromantes which was derived from the coastal fort town of Kormantin. They didn’t use their day names as a form of resistance and keeping their identity sacred.
- Historical Caribbean Figures: Popular Maroon leaders and rebels bore Ghanaian day names, examples of these were Cuffe (Kofi in native terms), Quamina (Kwamina in native terms) and Cuffy (Kofi in native terms)
- Modern Day Diaspora Usage: Today, many Afro-descendants in North America, Europe, and the Caribbean adopt Ghanaian day names to reclaim their African heritage.

== Examples of Ghanaian day names (mainly in the southern part) ==
	Male	Female
Sunday	Akwasi, Kwasi, Kwesi, Akwesi, Sisi, Kacely, Koshi, Kosi	Kosiwa, Kwasiwa, Awisi, Akosua, Akasi, Akos, Esi, Awesi, Awan
Monday	Kojo, Kwadwo, Jojo, Joojo, Kujoe, Kwadzo, Kodzo	Adzo, Adwoa, Adjoa, Adzoa, Adwoma
Tuesday	Kobla, Kwabena, Ebo, Komla, Kwabla, Kabenla, Kobe, Kobi, Kobby, Kobina	Abla, Abena, Abenayo, Abenkwa, Ablamaa, Araba
Wednesday	Kaku, Kwaku, Abeiku, Kuuku, Kweku, Keku, Koku	Akuba, Akua, Aku, Kukua, Akuma, Akusea, Ekua
Thursday	Yaw, Kwaw, Ekow, Yao	Yawo, Yaa, Yawa, Awo, Yaba
Friday	Kofi, Fifi, Fiifi, Yoofi, Kwoi	Afua, Afia, Afi, Efua, Efia, Afmaba, Effe
Saturday	Kwame, Kwami, Kwafica, Kwamina/Kwamena, Komi, Ato	Ama, Amma, Ami

== Examples of Ghanaian day names (mainly in the northern part) ==
(See Naming customs of the Dagbamba people.)

	Male	Female	Both sexes
Sunday	-	Lahiri	-
Monday	-	Tani	-
Tuesday	-	Zilaata	-
Wednesday	-	Laaba	
Thursday	-	Laamihi	
Friday	Azindoo	Azimpaga	Azima
Saturday	Sibidoo	Sibipaga	Sibiri

== See also ==
- Akan names
