= Kwasi Agyemang Gyan-Tutu =

Ghanaian politician

Kwasi Agyemang Gyan-Tutu (born 12 February 1957) is the Member of Parliament for Tain in the Brong Ahafo region of Ghana.

== Personal life ==
Kwasi is a Christian. He is married.

== Early life and education ==
He was born on 12 February 1957 in Badu in the Brong Ahafo region.

He had his BA (Hons) in Political Science in the University of Ghana from 1988 to 1991 and also MPHIL in Political Science from 1995 to 1999.

== Politics ==
He is a member of National Democratic Congress.

He was a committee member on Gender and Children, Employment, Social Welfare and State and the Public Accounts Committees.

== Employment ==
Before becoming a member of parliament, he worked in several positions in local government. He was the Deputy District Coordinator. He was the Director of the Eastern Flour Mill from 2011 to 2012 in Koforidua in Ghana. He was the Regional Admin Officer of CWSA from 2005 to 2006. He was the Head of Civil Service from 2000 to 2005. Assistant District Co-ord. Director from 1998 to 2000.
