= Maame Yaa Tiwaa Addo-Danquah =

Ghanaian female police officer

Maame Yaa Tiwaa Addo-Danquah (born 19 August 1969) is currently the technical Advisor to the Minister Of Interior Ghana. She was also held the position of executive director, Economic and Organised Crime Office (EOCO). She is the first female Commandant of the Ghana Police Command and Staff College (GPCSC) located in Winneba, the Central Region of Ghana.

== Early life and education ==
Addo-Danquah was born to Mr Kwame Adiya-Nimo and Nana Adwoa Agyekumwaa II (Queenmother of Banka) on 19 August 1969 at Konongo in the Asante Akyem district of the Ashanti Region. She is second of six children. Addo-Danquah had her primary and secondary education at Roman Catholic Primary and Middle Schools, and Bompata Secondary School respectively.

== Career ==
She got recruited into the Ghana Police Service on 27 July 1990. Maame Yaa is currently a Commissioner of Police.

== Personal life ==
Maame Yaa is married to Mr Ofosu Addo-Danquah, with three children.
