= Akwasi =

- Gender: Male

Origin
- Origin: Akan people
- Meaning: born on a Sunday
- Region of origin: Akan people

Other names
- Related names: Kwadwo (Monday); Kwabena (Tuesday); Kwaku (Wednesday); Yaw (Thursday); Kofi (Friday); Kwame (Saturday); Akwasi (Sunday)

Akwasi or Kwasí or Kwesi is an Akan masculine given name originating from the Akan people and their Akan day naming system, meaning born on a Sunday. People born on particular days are supposed to exhibit the characteristics or attributes and philosophy, associated with the days. Akwasi has the appellation Bodua or Obueakwan meaning agility. Thus, males named Akwasi are supposed to be agile by nature.

== Origin and Meaning ==
In the Akan culture, day names are known to be derived from deities. Akwasi originated from Koyasi and the Lord of Life Descent deity of the day Sunday. Males named Akwasi are known to be leaders in society and also known to be "clearer of the way" (obue-akwan). They are very inquisitive and tend to be pulled into a thing of interest.

== Male Variants of Akwasi ==
Day names in Ghana vary in spelling among the various Akan subgroups. The name is spelt Akwasi or Kwasi by the Akuapem, Akyem, Akwamu, Bono and Ashanti subgroups while the Fante subgroup spell it as Kwesi.

== Female version of Akwasi ==
In the Akan culture and other local cultures in Ghana, day names come in pairs for males and females. The variant of the name used for a female child born on Sunday is Akosua.

== Notable people with the name ==
Most Ghanaian children have their cultural day names in combination with their English or Christian names. Some notable people with such names are:

- Akwasi Ampofo Adjei (1947–2004), Ghanaian musician known professionally as Mr. A.A.A.
- Akwasi Afrifa (1936–1979), Ghanaian soldier and politician
- Akwasi Afrifa (1958–2006), Ghanaian politician
- Akwasi Dante Afriyie, Ghanaian politician
- Akwasi Antwi (born 1985), Canadian football player
- Akwasi Asante (born 1992), Dutch footballer
- Akwasi Appiah (born 1960), Ghanaian footballer and coach
- Akwasi Bretuo Assensoh (born 1946), Ghanaian academic and journalist
- Akwasi Boateng (born 1967), Ghanaian politician
- Akwasi Evans (1948–2019), American journalist and civil-rights activist
- Akwasi Fobi-Edusei (born 1986), English footballer
- Akwasi Oppong Fosu (born 1958), Ghanaian politician
- Akwasi Frimpong (born 1986), Ghanaian-Dutch runner and bobsledder
- Akwasi Konadu (born 1982), Ghanaian politician
- Akwasi Addo Alfred Kwarteng (born 1975), British politician
- Akwasi Addai Odike (born 1964), Ghanaian businessman and politician
- Akwasi Oduro (born 1987), Belgian footballer
- Akwasi Osei-Adjei (born 1949), Ghanaian politician
- Akwasi Owusu-Ansah (born 1988), American football player
- Akwasi Owusu Afrifa-Mensa (born 1971), Ghanaian politician
- Akwasi Yeboah (born 1997), British basketball player
- Nana Akwasi Asare (born 1986), Ghanaian footballer
- Blessing Akwasi Afrifah (born 2003), Israeli sprinter

== See also ==
- Akwasidae Festival
