= Outdooring =

Ghanaian naming ceremony

In Ghana, an Outdooring (Ga: kpojiemɔ; Akan: abadinto, Ewe language “vihehedego”) is the traditional naming ceremony for infants. Traditionally this ceremony occurs eight days after the child is born where parents bring their newborn "outdoors" and give the child a name. Cultural beliefs dictated that after eight days, the infant was likely to survive and could be provided a name. In addition to the day name, Ghanaians frequently give children a name of an elder relative, either living or deceased. During the Outdooring, male infants would be circumcised and female infants would have their ears pierced. Currently in Ghana, many of these practices including naming, circumcision, and ear piercing are done after birth within the hospital, and the Outdooring serves as a symbolic ceremony and celebration of birth.

Although most there are slight variations among the tribal Outdooring ceremonies, the practice's are mostly similar and focused on welcoming the baby. Among the Akan, babies would be raised toward the sky three times as an introduction to the gods and earth. The Ewes thank God, giver of life called Mawu Sogbolisa for the new gift of life. Among the Gas and Ewes, the elder drops water first, then a dips their finger into alcohol and places the finger on the child's tongues to symbolically let them know water represents good and alcohol represents evil. Libations are also poured as protection over the child. The Ewes also thank the ancestors for the new baby and ask for protection for the baby.

After being given a name, friends and family provide gifts to the baby which is then followed by a feast. Outdoorings are now very syncretic as Ghana's population has adopted Christianity or Islam. Christian Ghanaians will often give their children both local or English names with names, while in Muslim communities a mallam suggests several names for the parents to choose from.
