= Kofi (disambiguation) =

Kofi is a masculine given name of the Akan people of Ghana. It may refer to:

== Surname ==
- Ellia Kofi Junior (born 2004), Ghanaian footballer
- Laura Adorkor Kofi (died 1928), Ghanaian minister and activist
- Osei Kofi (born 1940), Ghanaian retired footballer
- Tony Kofi (born 1966), British jazz musician
- Rene Osei Kofi (born 1991), Ghanaian-Dutch footballer
- Vincent Kofi (1923–1974), Ghanaian artist and academic

== Stage or ring name ==
- Kofi (musician), British lovers rock singer Carol Simms (fl. 1976–present)
- Kofi B, stage name of Ghanaian highlife musician Kofi Boakye Yiadom (died 2020)
- Kofi Kingston, ring name of Ghanaian professional wrestler Kofi Sarkodie-Mensah

== Other uses ==
- Kofi (album), a 1995 album by jazz trumpeter Donald Byrd
- KOFI, an AM radio station licensed to serve Kalispell, Montana, United States

== See also ==
- Koffi
