= Oburoni =

Meaning of the word foreigner in Akan

Oborɔnyi is the Akan (or more specifically, the Fante) word for foreigner, literally meaning "those who come from over the horizon". It is often colloquially translated to mean "white person".

West Africa does not have an equivalent of the ubiquitous "mzungu", used throughout Eastern and Southern Africa, and even within Ghana, "oborɔnyi" predominates because it is common to the predominant local languages, those of Akan family, primarily Fante, Akuapem Twi and Asante Twi. Other Akan languages employ variants of oborɔnyi. For example, the Asante and Bono use the term broni or aborɔfo, and Northern Ghana uses a more complex pastiche of terms: gbampielli, pielli, siliminga (Dagbani and other Gur languages), bature, baturiya (Hausa language), nasaara (Arabic loan word used by some Muslims, literally meaning "Christian"), toubab (Mande languages), among other terms.

== Usage ==
Oborɔnyi is not a direct translation of "white". For most Ghanaians, an oborɔnyi refers to any person with lighter skin or straighter hair than a dark-skinned Ghanaian. Asians, Middle-Easterners, Whites, Latinos and sometimes, by extension, even dark-skinned people who are regarded as having been heavily influenced by foreign cultures, such as African Americans or Africans who have lived outside Africa for a long time, may all be called Oborɔnyi. Americans of Ghanaian descent are still considered oborɔnyi because they come from abroad. Oborɔnyi are often considered amusing, especially in rural areas, where children might follow around a foreigner, chanting the word. The term is not derogatory, but a way to identify someone who is not a native-born Ghanaian, or an obibinyi.

Oborɔnyi has a few uncommon modifiers in colloquial Akan. Oborɔnyi pɛtɛ, meaning "vulture foreigner" refers to poor foreigners or, more accurately, poor light-skinned foreigner. Oborɔnyi fitaa, meaning "white foreigner", refers to White people, fitaa being the Akan word for the colour white. Obibini-borɔnyi, meaning "black foreigner", is an amusing (and acceptable) term for a very light-skinned African or an African who has been heavily influenced by foreign cultures. Though these modifiers are infrequently used, they point to how views of different races are written into the Akan language. In short, Oborɔnyi refers to a light-skinned foreigner, but by extension, could also refer to a dark-skinned person (native or foreigner) who looks, acts or talks like a light-skinned foreigner."

In Ghana, a term commonly used for second-hand clothes is obroni wawu, meaning literally "dead foreigner" or clothes from those who died in Europe.

== Etymology ==
The word oborɔnyi derives from the word bor (Fante), which means "from beyond the horizon", and nyi, which is a suffix that means "person". The plural form of oborɔnyi is aborɔfo (fo is the plural form of nyi).

Another theory is that oborɔnyi (and its plural form aborɔfo) and derived from the similarly sounding phrase abrɔ nipa (abrɔ meaning "wicked" and nipa meaning person) for singular and abrɔfoɔ (meaning "wicked people"). Rather than "wicked", it could alternatively mean "trickster", "one who frustrates" or "one who cannot be trusted". Many believe this to be the case considering the deeds of White people in Ghana in the 17th–19th centuries, but present-day Ghanaians do not have this in mind when they call someone oborɔnyi (even though they might know that this is how the term came about).

== Related ==
In Central and West Africa among either Mandé, Wolof speakers, and Francophone Africans, the name for a person of European descent is Toubab or tubabu, this is also true of the pockets of Mande speakers in northern and northwestern Ghana.

Initially among the Yoruba, and subsequently in casual speech in a number of other languages in Nigeria, the word used for a "white" person is Oyinbo.

== See also ==
- Akan language
- Akan languages
- Twi
