= Mondele =

Mondele, or mundelé, (pl. mindele) is a Bobangi term meaning "white" (white man, not the color, mpembe) European-style person, person with light skin color. The words were originally used to describe Belgian and French colonists, but can be used to describe any light-skinned non-black person.

According to the Lingala Online Dictionary "It seems that the origin of the word comes from the bobangi language and that the radical "ndele" lets us believe that the african perceived the european as someone who is insincere (="ndelengene") rather than by his color."

The word can also be applied even to sub-Saharan Africans with a much lighter skin complexion, Coloureds, foreign-raised locals speaking with foreign accents, visiting expatriates, or westernised blacks (including African Americans), who are referred to specifically as mundele ndombe.

== Etymology ==
The term originated from the Bangi language.

== See also ==
In Ghana the word used for a 'white' person or foreigner is ‘Obroni’ in the local languages, those of the Akan family.

In Nigeria, the word used for a 'white' person is Oyibo.

In Uganda, Tanzania and Kenya the word used for a white or foreign person is 'mzungu'.

In Togo and Benin, the word used for a white person is 'yovo'.

In Central and West Africa (most frequently in the Gambia, Senegal, and Mali, also in Ivory Coast) the word used for a 'white' person is 'Toubab'.
