= Gold Coast alphabet =

Alphabets used during the Gold Coast era

The Gold Coast alphabet (also Gold Coast language) was a Latin alphabet used to write the Akan language during the Gold Coast era, now Ghana. It differed from the current Akan alphabet in several ways, most fundamentally in vowel notation.

== Vowels ==
Akan has nine vowels, four pairs that differ whether they have an advanced tongue root (atr), and /a/, which is atr-neutral. In the Gold Coast script, the non-atr vowels were written with the five vowels of the Latin script, a e i o u, and the atr vowels by adding a subscript dot to these. (The atr vowels have a hollow sound to them, whereas the non-atr vowels sound rather like the lax vowels of English.) In modern Akan, seven vowel letters are used, with two of them being ambiguous. In addition, the Gold Coast script used a tilde to mark nasal vowels, which are not marked in modern Akan.

Phoneme	Sound	Gold Coast	Modern Akan
i̘	i̘	ị	i
i	ɪ	i	e
e̘	e̘	ẹ	e
e	ɛ	e	ɛ
a	a	a	a
[a̘]	ɐ *	a	a
o	ɔ	o	ɔ
o̘	o̘	ọ	o
u	ʊ	u	o
u̘	u̘	ụ	u

* The allophone of /a/ produced by vowel harmony with atr vowels is not itself atr in Asante dialect, but nonetheless is markedly distinct from the [a] allophone. It is not distinguished from [a] in either orthography. In the Fante dialect, it has merged with [ɛ]. (See International Phonetic Alphabet for an explanation of the symbols in the first two columns.)
