= Mbato language =

Kwa language of Ivory Coast and Ghana

Mbato
- Nghlwa
- Native to: Ivory Coast
- Region: La Mé
- Ethnicity: M'Bato
- Native speakers: (25,000 cited 1993)
- Language family: Niger–Congo?: Atlantic–Congo; Kwa; Potou–Tano; Potou; Mbato

Language codes
- ISO 639-3: gwa
- Glottolog: mbat1247

Mbato, also known as Mbatto, Nghlwa, Potu or Gwa, is a Kwa language spoken in Ivory Coast and in Ghana. It is one of two Potou languages, along with Ebrié. The Mbato people primarily live in the La Mé region of Ivory Coast, particularly in the sub-prefecture of Oghlwapo in the Alépé department.

== Phonology ==
Consonants
	Labial	Dental	Palatal	Velar	Labio-velar
Plosives: fortis, voiceless	p	t	c	k	
Plosives: fortis, voiced	(b)	d	ɟ [ɟ, dʒ]	g	gb [g͡b]
Plosives: lenis, voiced	ɓ¹		ʄ	ɠ	gɓ [g͡ɓ]
Sonorants: lenis	ɓ² [ɓ, m]		j [j, ɲ]		w [w, ŋʷ, ŋ͡m]
Fricatives	f/(v)	s/(z)		h [x, h]	

Mbato has no nasal consonant phonemes, but the nasal vowels (see table below) cause the sonorants [ɓ, l, j, w] to assimilate and be pronounced as [m, n, ɲ, ŋʷ].

There are two bilabial implosive phonemes, /ɓ¹/ and /ɓ²/. The first is always pronounced as [ɓ], while the second is pronounced [m] in the context of a nasal vowel.

The sounds [b, v, z] are marginal and occur only in loanwords.

Vowels
	Oral			Nasal	
Close	i		u	ɪ̃	ʊ̃
Mid	e [e, ɪ]		o [o, ʊ]	ɪ̃	ʊ̃
Open	ɛ	a	ɔ	ɛ̃	ɔ̃ [ɔ̃, ã]

While the Proto-Potou language likely had an ±ATR system, it has disappeared from Ebrié and left only traces in Mbato.

Mbato has a tonal system consisting of three level tones.

== Grammar ==
=== Noun Classes ===
The noun class prefixes in Mbato serve to distinguish between certain homophones and between singular and plural forms. Originally, this system would have been more robust, as seen in other Niger-Congo languages.

The four nominal prefixes are ó-, à-, ʊ́̃-, and ʊ̃̀-. The latter two, which are nasal vowels, can also be realized as syllabic nasals, transcribed as ɴ́- and ɴ̀-.

Prefix	Word	Gloss
ó-	óbū	stone
à-	àwɔ́	cat
ʊ̃́-, ɴ́-	ɴ́nē	yam
ʊ̃̀-, ɴ̀-	ʊ̃́mɛ̄	rope.pl
