= Oyinbo =

Yoruba term for Europeans and people with fair skin/foreigners

Òyìnbó or "Oyibo" is a Yoruba word used to refer to white people. The word is popular in Nigeria among other groups as well in a number of minor variations. Òyìnbó is generally understood by most Nigerians and many Africans due to popularity of Nollywood and Nigerian pop culture.

== Etymology ==
The word is coined from the Yoruba translation of “peeled skin,” "lightened," or “skinless,” which translates “yin” – to scratch, and “bo” – to off/peel/lightened. the "O" starting the word "Òyìnbó" is a pronoun. Hence, "Òyìnbó" or “Oyibo” translates literally to "the person with a peeled-off or lightened skin". Other variations of the term in the Yoruba language include Eyinbo, which is shortened to "Eebo", as well as Oinbo, and Oyibo.

== Evidence of borrowing into Igbo lexicon ==
One of the most authoritative confirmations of the Yoruba origin of "Oyibo" comes from the renowned Igbo linguist and etymologist, Michael J.C. Echeruo. In his 2001 publication Igbo-English Dictionary: A Comprehensive Dictionary of the Igbo Language, with an English-Igbo Index, he annotated in the Igbo section that Oyibo is a loanword from the Yoruba term "Oyinbo". Furthermore, in the English-Igbo index section, under the entry for "white man", the translation includes "bekee", "Onyeocha", and "Oyibo", with the annotation "loan" specifically marked beside Oyibo,further cementing the borrowed status of the term into the Igbo languages.

There are numerous other instances recorded by scholars in history acknowledging that, despite Oyinbo being used by many people in the modern times of southern Nigeria, it finds its origin in the Yoruba language. For instance, Ugo Nwokeji and Romanus Aboh in separate books came to the same conclusion, positing that the term "Oyibo" used by the Igbo is borrowed from the original Oyinbo used by Yoruba.

Oyibo was also used in reference to people who are foreign or Europeanised, including Saros in the towns of Onitsha and Enugu in the late 19th and early 20th century. Sierra Leonean missionaries, according to Ajayi Crowther, a Yoruba, and John Taylor, an Igbo, descendants of repatriated slaves, were referred to as oyibo ojii by the people of Onitsha.

Olaudah Equiano, an African abolitionist, claimed in his 1789 narrative that the people in Essaka, Igboland, where he claimed to be from, used the term Oye-Eboe in reference to "Stout (strong, powerful), mahogany-coloured men from the south west of us". Vincent Carretta suggested that this might be an earlier version of the term Oyibo, however as he and Gloria Chuku later point out, Equiano's use of Oye-Eboe, was in reference to other Africans and not Caucasians. Gloria Chuku suggested that Equiano's use of Oye-Eboe is not linked to Oyibo, and that it is a reference to the generic term Onitsha and other more western Igbo people used to refer to other Igbo people. Both Paul Lovejoy and Vincent Carretta identified Oye-Eboe as a reference to the Aro.

== See also ==
- Gwailo
- Toubab
- Mzungu
- Oburoni
