= Akuapem =

Akuapem may refer to:

- Akuapem people, an ethnic group of Ghana
- Akuapem dialect, their language
- Akuapem Kingdom, a former kingdom
