= Bureau of Ghana Languages =

Agency of the government of Ghana that focuses on Ghanaian languages and publication

Agency overview
- Formed: 1951
- Headquarters: Accra and Tamale
- Agency executive: William Boateng, Chair of the Bureau of Ghana Languages
- Website: http://www.bgl.gov.gh

The Bureau of Ghana Languages (BGL) is an agency of the government of Ghana that promotes Ghanaian languages, including publication of materials in them. It focuses on 11 languages: Akuapem Twi, Asante Twi, Ewe, Mfantse, Ga, Dangme, Nzema, Dagbani, Dagaare, Gonja and Kasem.

The bureau provides services for the promotion, orthographic control and learning of Ghanaian languages, as well as general research into Ghanaian languages, writing, translation of non-local language documents, assessment, editing and publication of documents in Ghanaian languages. It also influences government policies on Ghanaian languages through the co-ordination of all agencies involved in promoting Ghanaian languages. It has two offices, one in Accra and the other in Tamale.

== History ==
The bureau was founded in 1951, originally as the Gold Coast Vernacular Literature Bureau, and later given its current name in 1957. In 1958 it was converted into a department under the Ministry of Information. It was later transferred from the Ministry of Information to the Ministry of Education in 1963. The Bureau has since 1 December 1989 been under the National Commission on Culture by the PNDC Law 238. The Bureau of Ghana Languages is a government institution involved in the educational and cultural effort of the nation. It is a unique institution because, as a government publishing house, it is the only institution of its kind that publishes exclusively in Ghanaian languages.

In 2009 the Bureau was reported to be facing financial difficulties. After being placed within the Ministry for Chieftaincy and Religious Affairs, it received fewer contracts from the Ghana Education Service. Its printer had broken down, and the Bureau owed debt to private printers. The director Francis Ehom Kwaw, was living in the Bureau offices after failing to receive official accommodation.

In 2026 the Bureau formally endorsed Ahanta language orthography for use in schools across Ahanta land.

Heads of the Bureau of Ghana Languages
Name	Beginning of term	End of term	Region
R.C. Whitaker	1951	1953	
John A Hamilton	1953	1956	
Edwin L. Read Jr.	1956	1958	
Samuel K. Otoo	1958	1968	
Samuel K. Otoo	1968	1972	
Felix S. Konu	1973	1982	
Daniel E. K. Krampah	1982	1995	
John N. Nanor	1995	2001	
J. C. Abbey	2001	2005	
A.A . Arries-Tagoe	2005	2005	
Francis E. Kwaw	2005	2018	
William Boateng	2018		
