= Brong =

Brong can refer to:

- Brong-Ahafo region, a former region in southern Ghana
- Abron language, also known as Brong, in Ghana
