= KXB =

KXB or kxb may refer to:

- Krobu language (ISO 639-3: kxb), a Tano language of Ivory Coast
- Sangia Nibandera Airport (IATA: KXB), an airport located at Kolaka, Southeast Sulawesi, Indonesia
