= Wasa language =

Dialect of Akan in Ghana

Wasa
- Native to: Ghana, Ivory Coast
- Ethnicity: Wasa people
- Native speakers: 270,000 (2013)
- Language family: Niger–Congo?: Atlantic–Congo; Volta–Congo; Kwa; Potou–Tano; Tano; Akan; Twi-Fante; Bono–Wasa; Wasa
- Dialects: Amenfi; Fianse
- Writing system: Latin

Language codes
- ISO 639-3: wss
- Glottolog: wasa1244

Wasa, also rendered as Wassa and Wasaw, is an Akan language common to the Wasa people and closely related to Twi-Fante. It is spoken by 273,000 in southwestern Ghana, mainly in the Wasa Amenfi West and Wasa Amenfi East districts. There are also some Wasa speakers in Ivory Coast. Wasa has limited mutual intelligibility with Bono (Abron). Its dialects include Amenfi and Fianse.
