= Bono dialect =

Dialect of Akan in Ghana

Bono
- Abron
- Native to: Ghana, Ivory Coast
- Ethnicity: Bono
- Native speakers: 1.4 million (2013)
- Language family: Niger–Congo?: Atlantic–Congo; Volta–Congo; Kwa; Potou–Tano; Tano; Akan; Twi-Fante; Bono–Wasa; Bono

Language codes
- ISO 639-3: abr
- Glottolog: abro1238

- People: Bonofoɔ
- Language: Bono Twi
- Country: Bonoman

Bono, also known as Abron, Brong, and Bono Twi, is a dialect cluster within the Twi-Fante dialect continuum that is spoken by the Bono people. Bono is spoken by approximately 1.2 million people in Ghana, primarily in the Bono Region, Bono East Region, and by over 300,000 in eastern Côte d'Ivoire.

The Bible Society of Ghana commenced the translation of the Bono Twi Bible in 2017 and had completed the translation of the 27 books of the New Testament. The overall project will be completed in 2027 with the translation of the Old Testament.

== Relationship with other dialects of Twi-Fante ==
Intelligibility among the different dialects of Bono can be difficult. Bono is mutually intelligible with neighboring dialects of Akan such as Asante, but the degree of intelligibility drops off with geographical distance, and Fante is effectively a different language. Most speakers of Bono are bidialectal in Asante.

Bono and Wasa are the most divergent dialects of Twi-Fante. Along with Fante, Bono is also one of the most conservative, retaining Akan (i.e. Central Tano) features such as the third-person plural pronoun bɛ that have been lost elsewhere.

=== Differences from other dialects of Twi-Fante ===
==== Phonological ====
- Bono tends to use /h/ where Asante has palatalized it to hy (/ɕ/) and hw (/ɕʷ/): cf. Bono hia vs. Asante hyia ("to meet").
- Bono has [l] and [r] in free variation, where Asante has only /r/ or only /l/. As Twi-Fante generally has [d] in complementary distribution with [r], there are some Bono words with [l], [r], and [d] in free variation, e.g. fiela/fiera/fieda ("Friday"). A similar process may be found in some varieties of Asante, e.g. akɔlaa/akɔraa/akɔdaa ("child").
- In most Twi-Fante dialects, the emphatic particle nà is pronounced with a low tone, whereas in Bono it is né, with a high tone.
- Unlike other varieties of Twi-Fante, and most Kwa languages in general, which have nominal vowel prefixes, many Bono nouns have either a homorganic nasal prefix or no nasal prefix at all: cf. Bono pɔnkɔ vs. Asante ɔpɔnkɔ ("horse"). Conversely, while most dialects have lost the nominal vowel suffix, Bono as well as Asante have retained it: cf. Bono nsuo vs. Akuapem nsu ("water"). Asante is the only dialect to have retained both vowel prefix and suffix: cf. Bono wuo, Asante owuo, and Akuapem owu ("death").

==== Grammatical ====
- The most characteristic feature of Bono is its use of the third-person plural pronoun bɛ, not found in any other Twi-Fante dialect.
- Twi-Fante subject markers are usually only used when a subject is not made explicit, and are only ever used alongside an explicit subject in emphatic sentences. However, in Bono, an explicit subject is almost always used alongside a subject marker, whether the sentence is emphatic or not: cf. Asante Kofi kɔe ("Kofi went", with explicit subject and without subject marker) and ɔkɔe ("He went", with subject marker) vs. Bono Kofi ɔkɔe (literally "Kofi he went", with explicit subject and subject marker). Similarly, Bono requires a possessor as well as a possessive pronoun, e.g. Kofi ne dan (literally "Kofi his house"), although this is a feature found in Fante and Akuapem.
- In Bono, the first-person singular prefixes me- reduce to a homorganic syllabic nasal when they occur immediately before a consonant, e.g. mbaeɛ ("I came"), whereas other Twi-Fante dialects do not reduce it, e.g. mebae ("I came").
- Bono does not distinguish the third-person singular animate ɔ- and inanimate ɛ- possessive prefixes common to other Twi-Fante dialects, instead using ɔ- (sometimes pronounced wɔ-) for both: cf. Bono ɔkɔ ("he/she/it has gone") vs. Akuapem ɔkɔ ("he/she has gone") and ɛkɔ ("it has gone").

== Grammar ==
=== Pronouns ===
	Independent	Subject	Possessive	Object
First sing.	me	me-	me-	m
Second sing.	wo	wo-	wo	w
Third sing.	ɔno	wɔ-	ɔ-; ne	no
First pl.	yɛ	yɛ-	yɛ	yɛ
Second pl.	hõ	hõ-	hõ	hõ
Third pl.	bɛ	bɛ-	bɛ	bɛ
Unspecified		ɛ-		
