= Asante Twi =

Dialect of Akan in Ghana

- Native to: Ashanti
- Ethnicity: Ashanti
- Native speakers: 3.8 million (2013)
- Language family: Niger–Congo?: Atlantic–Congo; Volta–Congo; Kwa; Potou–Tano; Tano; Akan; Twi-Fante; (core); Asante-Akyem-Kwahu dialect; Asante Twi
- Writing system: Latin, Braille

Official status
- Regulated by: Akan Orthography Committee

Language codes
- ISO 639-3: –
- Glottolog: asan1239

- People: Asantefoɔ
- Language: Asante Twi
- Country: Asanteman

Asante Twi, also known as Ashanti, Ashante, or Asante, is one of the principal varieties of the Twi-Fante language. As the variety spoken by the Asante people (formerly known as Ashanti), is one of the three literary standards of Twi-Fante, the others being Akuapem Twi and Fante. There are over 3.8 million speakers of Asante, mainly concentrated in Ghana and southeastern Côte d'Ivoire, and especially in and around the Ashanti Region of Ghana.

A man speaking Asante Twi
