= Akuapem Twi =

Dialect of Akan in Ghana

- Akuapem
- Native to: Ghana
- Ethnicity: Akuapem
- Native speakers: 626,000 (2013)
- Language family: Niger–Congo?: Atlantic–Congo; Volta–Congo; Kwa; Potou–Tano; Tano; Akan; Twi-Fante; (core); Akuapem–Fante; Akuapem Twi
- Writing system: Latin

Official status
- Regulated by: Akan Orthography Committee

Language codes
- ISO 639-3: –
- Glottolog: akua1239
- IETF: tw-akuapem

Akuapem Twi, also known as Akuapim, Akwapem, and Akwapi, is one of the literary dialects of the Twi-Fante language, along with Asante and Fante, with which it is mutually intelligible. There are 626,000 speakers of Akuapem, mainly concentrated in Ghana and southeastern Côte d'Ivoire. It is the historical literary and prestige dialect of Twi-Fante, having been chosen as the basis of the Akan translation of the Bible.

== Etymology ==
The name "Akuapem" is thought to derive from either nkoa apem ("thousand subjects") or akuw-apem ("thousand companies").

== History ==
Akuapem's orthography was first developed by missionaries at the Gold Coast Basel Mission in 1842, but its written history begins in 1853 with the publication of two grammars, the German Elemente des Akwapim Dialects der Odshi Sprache and the English Grammatical Outline and Vocabulary of the Oji Language with especial reference to the Akwapim Dialect, both written by Hans Nicolai Riis, nephew of the Gold Coast Basel Mission's founder Andreas Riis. These would not be followed in the bibliography of Akuapem writing until the translation of the New Testament.

Akuapem was chosen as a representative dialect for Twi-Fante because the missionaries at Basel felt it a suitable compromise. Christaller, who had himself learned Akyem but believed Akuapem was the better choice, described the issue, and its solution, in the introduction to his 1875 Grammar of the Asante and Fante language called Tshi:

It [Akuapem] is an Akan dialect influenced by Fante, steering in the middle course between other Akan dialects and Fante in sounds, forms and expressions; it admits peculiarities of both branches as far as they do no contradict each other, and is, therefore, best capable of being enriched from both sides.

=== Bible ===
Akuapem's history as a literary dialect originates with its selection to serve as the basis of the Akan translation of the New Testament, published in 1870 with a second edition in 1878, and the entire Bible, published in 1871. Both were written by the Gold Coast Basel Mission, principally by German missionary and linguist Johann Gottlieb Christaller and native Akan linguists and missionaries David Asante, Theophilus Opoku, Jonathan Palmer Bekoe, and Paul Keteku.

Despite the publication of the Bible, literacy would not be widespread among the Akan for some time, nor even among the European colonizers. For instance, when British officer Sir Garnet Wolseley, who was and still is known in Ghana as "Sargrenti" (a corruption of "Sir Garnet"), began his campaign into Ghana during the Third Anglo-Ashanti War in 1873, he intended to address his summons to war to Asante king Kofi Karikari in English and Asante, only to find that, to their knowledge, "no proper written representation of the Fante or Asante dialect existed", delaying the dispatch of the summons for almost two weeks; all this even though an Akuapem New Testament had existed for three years and the entire Bible for two.

=== Grammar and dictionary ===
Christaller's A Grammar of the Asante and Fante language called Tshi (1875) and A Dictionary of the Asante and Fante language called Tshi (1881), written with reference to Akuapem, remain the definitive academic grammar and dictionary of Twi, despite the dialects' orthography, vocabulary, and grammar having changed in the century since their publication.

== Phonology ==
=== Consonants ===
		Labial	Alveolar	Post-alveolar	Retroflex	Palatal	Velar	Glottal
Nasal	voiced	m ⟨m⟩	n ⟨n⟩			ɲ ⟨ny, n⟩	ŋ ⟨ng, n⟩	
Nasal	labialized		nʷ ⟨nw⟩					
Stop/ affricate	voiced	b ⟨b⟩	d ⟨d⟩	d͡ʒ ⟨dw⟩		d͡ʑ ~ ɟ͡ʝ ⟨gy⟩	ɡ ⟨g⟩	
Stop/ affricate	aspirated	pʰ ⟨p⟩	tʰ ⟨t⟩			t͡ɕʰ ~ c͡çʰ ⟨ky⟩	kʰ ⟨k⟩	
Stop/ affricate	labialized					t͡ɕʷ ⟨tw⟩	kʷ ⟨kw⟩	
Fricative	voiceless	f ⟨f⟩	s ⟨s⟩			ç ⟨hy⟩		h ⟨h⟩
Fricative	labialized							hʷ ⟨hw⟩
Approximant						j ⟨y⟩	w ⟨w⟩	
Tap/flap			ɾ ⟨r⟩		ɽ ⟨r⟩			
Trill			r ⟨r⟩					
Lateral			l ⟨l⟩					

=== Vowels ===
Akuapem dialect has a ten-vowel system with a two-way distinction based on what has traditionally been analyzed as advanced tongue root, but which may be more accurately described as an expanded pharynx.

		Front	Central	Back
Close	+ATR	i		u
Close	–ATR	ɪ		ʊ
Mid	+ATR	e		o
Mid	–ATR	ɛ		ɔ
Open	+ATR		æ	
Open	–ATR		ɑ	

Front vowels additionally show a distinction in duration, where –ATR front vowels are shorter than their +ATR counterparts.

==== Tone ====
Twi has at least five tones:

- High tone: H
- Mid tone: M
- Low tone: L
- Rising tone: R
- Falling tone: F

However, when writing Twi using the Latin script, tone marks are not used.

==== Diphthongs ====
Twi contains the diphthongs /ɪɛ/, /ei/, /iæ/, /ie/, /ʊɔ/, /ue/, /uo/, and either /æo/ or /ɑʊ/.

== Proverbs ==
In his 1865 collection, Wit and Wisdom from West Africa, Richard Francis Burton published over 250 Twi (Oji) proverbs and sayings with English translations, taken from Hans Nicolaus Riis's Grammatical Outline and Vocabulary of the Oji-language published in 1854. (Riis, nephew of Andreas Riis, went to Ghana as a missionary in 1845.) Here are some of those sayings:

- "Wo te adur-a ebi ka w'ano." "If you lay poison (i.e. attempt to poison others), some will touch your mouth." (#2)
- "Sika ben wo-a, ehoa." "When gold comes near to you it glistens (i.e. an alluring object placed before the eyes stimulates desire)." (#9)
- "Ohi enni ni yonku." "A poor man has no friend." (#18)
- "Oduacen se, nea 'ko ne yem no, enni nede, na nea vo n'afonnom no, enye nedea." "The monkey says that which has gone into his belly is his, but what is in his mouth is not his (i.e. any external possession is uncertain, however well secured)." (#27)
