= Toubab =

West African name for a person of European descent

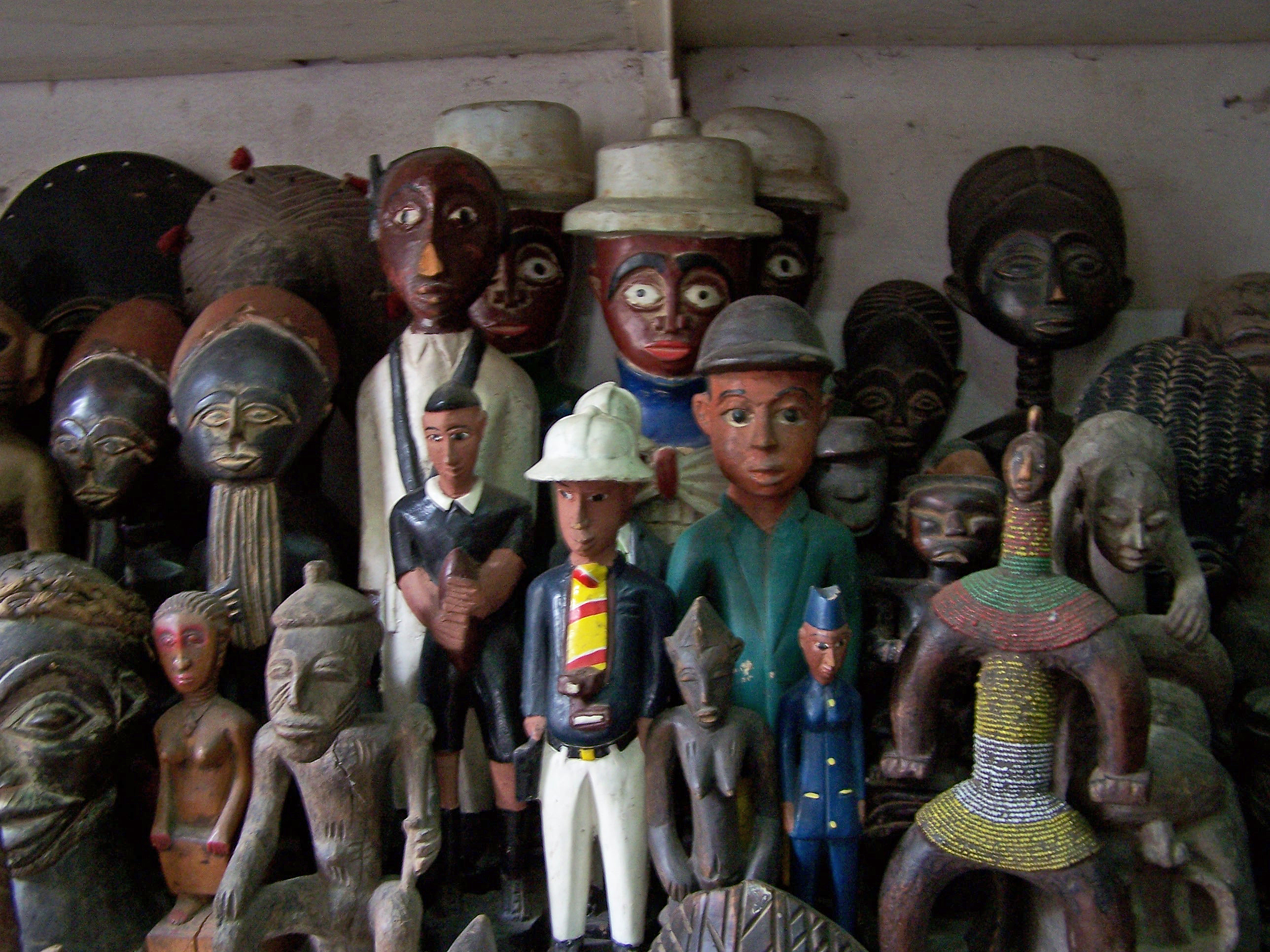
A tourist depicted amongst other kinds of people

Toubab (alternatively Toubabou or Toubob) is a West African name for a person of European descent ("whites"). Used most frequently in The Gambia, Senegal, Guinea, and Mali, and also in Ivory Coast. The word can also be applied to any perceived traveler, usually only those with a different phenotype, up to foreign-raised locals (thus with a different accent) or visiting expatriates.

== Central and East Africa ==
In East Africa and Eastern part of the Democratic Republic of Congo, the word used for a white person or a foreigner is muzungu.

In both the Democratic Republic of the Congo and the Republic of the Congo another word used for a white person is mondele (or mundele).
