= Advanced and retracted tongue root =

Tongue position when pronouncing certain vowels

Advanced tongue root (+ATR)

◌̘

◌᫠

◌꭪
- IPA number: 417

Encoding
- Entity (decimal): &#792;&#6880;&#43882;
- Unicode (hex): U+0318 U+1AE0 U+AB6A
Image

Retracted tongue root (−ATR)

◌̙

◌᫡

◌꭫
- IPA number: 418

Encoding
- Entity (decimal): &#793;&#6881;&#43883;
- Unicode (hex): U+0319 U+1AE1 U+AB6B
Image

Retracted tongue root (RTR)

◌ˤ
- IPA number: 423

Encoding
- Entity (decimal): &#740;
- Unicode (hex): U+02E4
Image

In phonetics, advanced tongue root (ATR or +ATR), or expanded pharynx, and retracted tongue root (RTR or −ATR) are contrasting states of the pharynx during the pronunciation of vowels in some languages, especially in West and East Africa, but also in Kazakh, Mongolian and Qiangic languages. ATR vs RTR was once suggested to be the basis for the distinction between tense and lax vowels in European languages such as German, but Ladefoged and Maddieson have found that the tongue root position in Germanic languages is not an independent gesture.

== Advanced tongue root ==
Advanced tongue root, abbreviated ATR or +ATR, also called expanded, involves the expansion of the pharyngeal cavity by moving the base of the tongue forward, lowering the larynx, and otherwise expanding the walls of the pharynx during the pronunciation of a vowel. This may result in +ATR vowels being longer than −ATR vowels. The lowering of the larynx sometimes adds a breathy quality to the vowel.

Voiced stops such as [b], [d], [ɡ] can often involve non-contrastive tongue root advancement. Results can be seen occasionally in sound changes relating stop voicing and vowel frontness, such as voicing stop consonants before front vowels in the Oghuz Turkic languages; or in Adjarian's law (the fronting of vowels after voiced stops in certain dialects of Armenian).

True uvular consonants appear to be incompatible with advanced tongue root, i.e. they are inherently [−ATR]. Combined with the above tendency for voiced stops to be [+ATR], that motivates the extreme rarity of the voiced uvular stop [ɢ] compared to its voiceless counterpart [q].

The International Phonetic Alphabet represents ATR with a "left tack" diacritic, [◌̘ ].

In languages in which they occur, advanced-tongue-root vowels very often contrast with retracted tongue root (RTR) vowels in a system of vowel harmony, which occurs commonly in large parts of West Africa.

ATR vowels involve a certain tension in the tongue, often in the lips and jaw as well; the ear can often perceive this tension as a "brightness" (narrow formants) compared to RTR vowels. Nonetheless, phoneticians do not refer to ATR vowels as tense vowels since the word tense already has several meanings in European phonetics.

== Retracted tongue root ==
Retracted tongue root, abbreviated RTR, is the retraction of the base of the tongue in the pharynx during the pronunciation of a vowel, the opposite articulation of advanced tongue root. This type of vowel has also been referred to as pharyngealized.

The neutral position of the tongue during the pronunciation of a vowel, contrasting with advanced tongue root and thus marked -ATR, is also sometimes referred to as retracted tongue root.

The diacritic for RTR in the International Phonetic Alphabet is the right tack, [◌̙ ].

== Tongue root position and vowel harmony ==
Many African languages, such as Maasai, have systems of vowel harmony based on tongue root position. That is illustrated here with the Fante dialect of Akan, which has fifteen vowels: five +ATR vowels, five −ATR vowels, and five nasal vowels.

Fante ±ATR vowels
Ortho- graphy	+ATR value	−ATR value	Approx. European equivalents
i	/i̘/		[i]
e	/e̘/	/i/	[e], [ɪ]
ɛ		/e/	[ɛ]
a	/a̘/	/a/	[æ], [ɑ]
ɔ		/o/	[ɔ]
o	/o̘/	/u/	[o], [ʊ]
u	/u̘/		[u]

There are two harmonization rules that govern the vowels that may co-occur in a word:

1. All −ATR vowels become +ATR when followed by a peripheral +ATR vowel (/i̘ a̘ u̘/). That is, orthographic e ɛ a ɔ o become i e a o u before i u and sometimes before a.
2. As long as it does not conflict with the previous rule, the +ATR mid vowels (/e̘ o̘/) become −ATR high vowels (/i u/) when preceded by a −ATR non-high vowel (/e a o/). (It is not reflected in the orthography; underlying and surface vowels are both spelled e o.)

In the Asante dialect, the ±ATR distinction has merged in the low vowel and so /a/ is harmonically neutral, occurring with either set of vowels. In addition, the two vowels written e (/e̘/ and /i/) and o (/o̘/ and /u/) are often not distinguished and are approximately equivalent to European [e] and [o], as reflected in the orthography; for such people, the second harmonization rule does not apply.

== Tongue root and phonation ==
With advances in fiber-optic laryngoscopy at the end of the twentieth century, new types of phonation were discovered that involve more of the larynx than just the glottis. One of the few languages studied thus far, the Togolese language Kabiyé, has a vocalic distinction that had been assumed to be one of tongue root. However, it turned out to be a phonation distinction of faucalized voice versus harsh voice.

It is not yet clear whether that is characteristic of ±ATR distinctions in general.

== Additional images ==
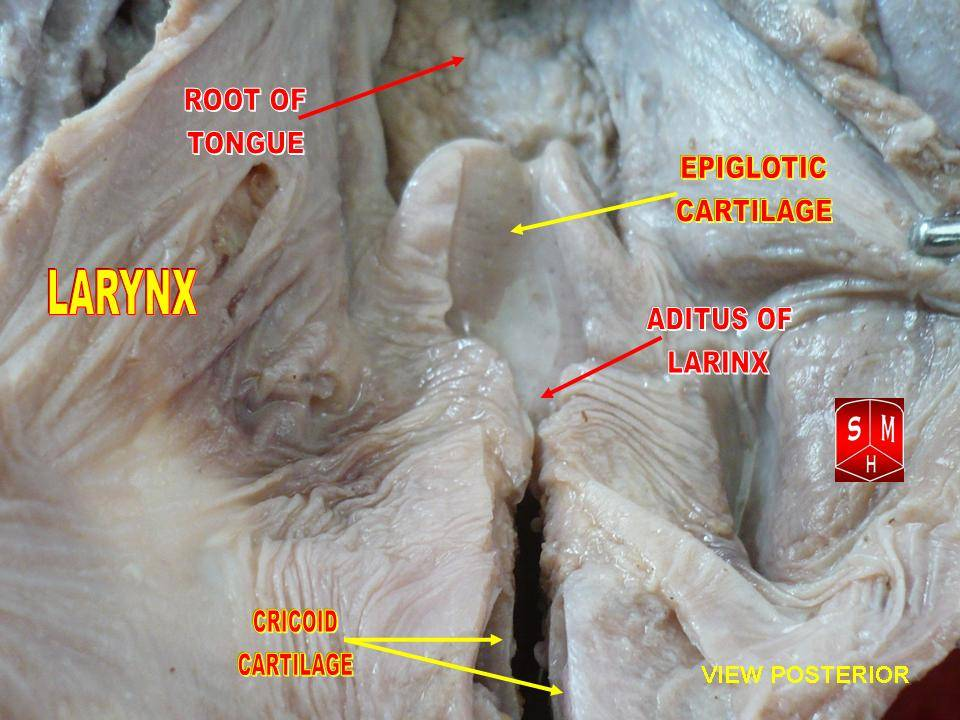
Root of tongue

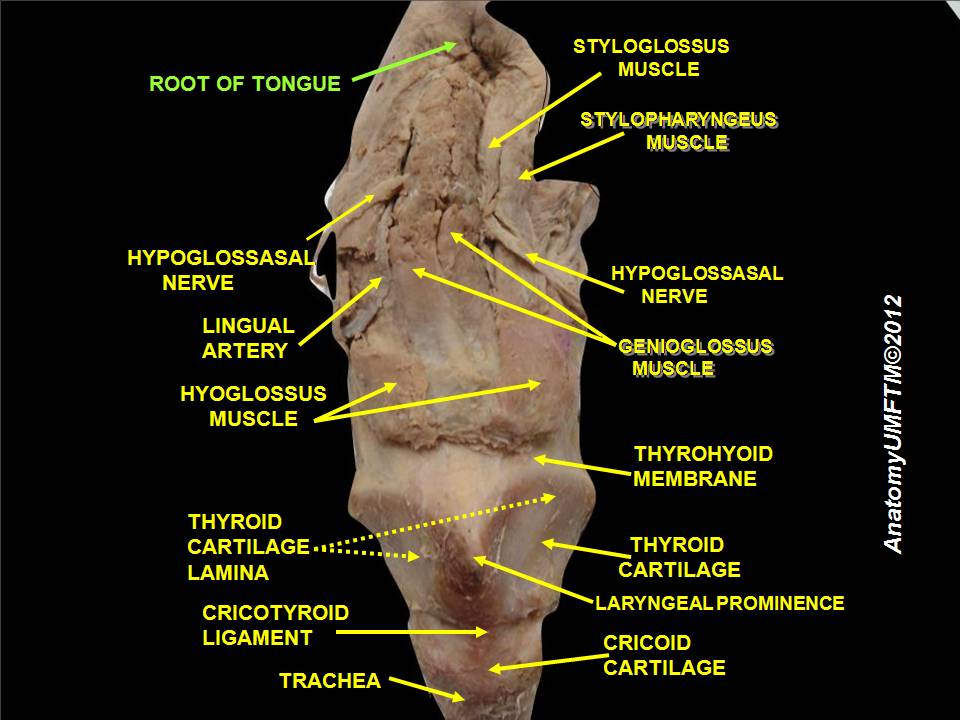
Tongue root

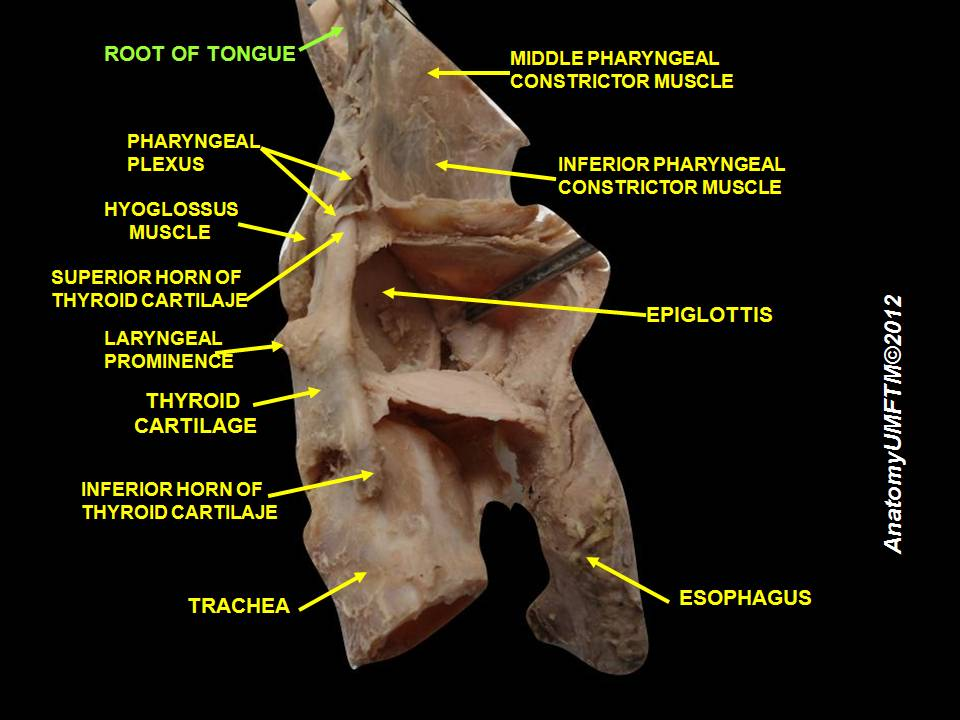
Tongue root

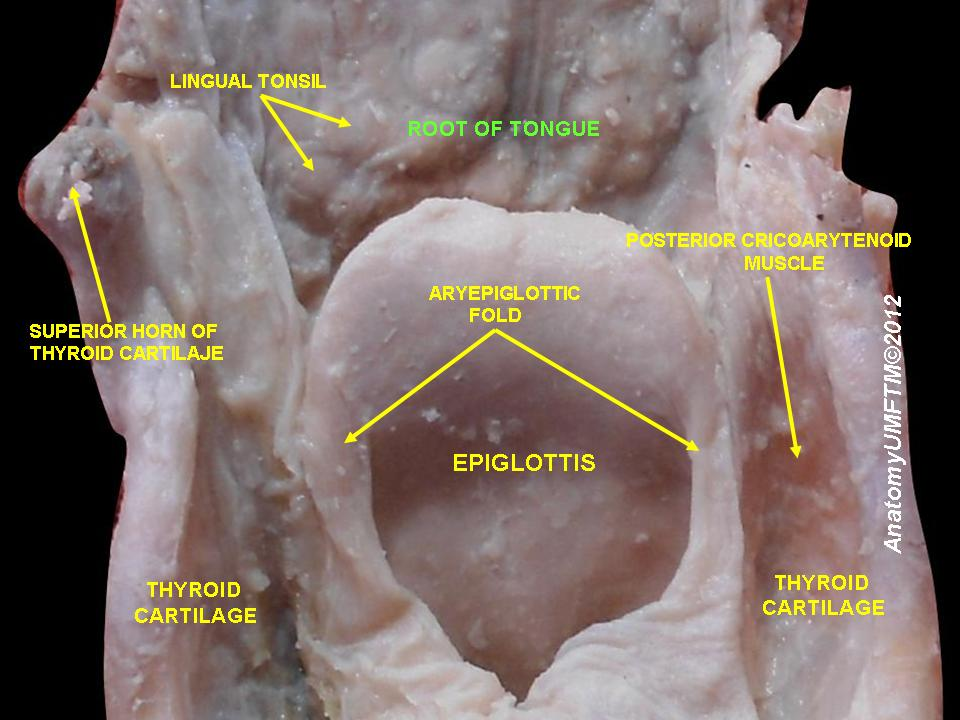
tongue root

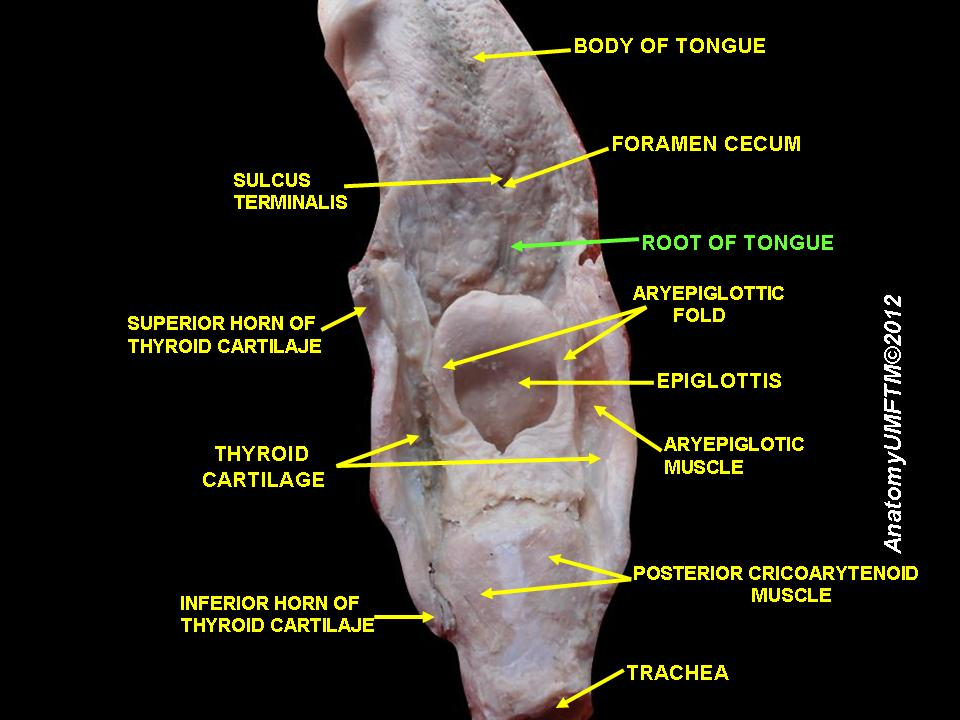
tongue root

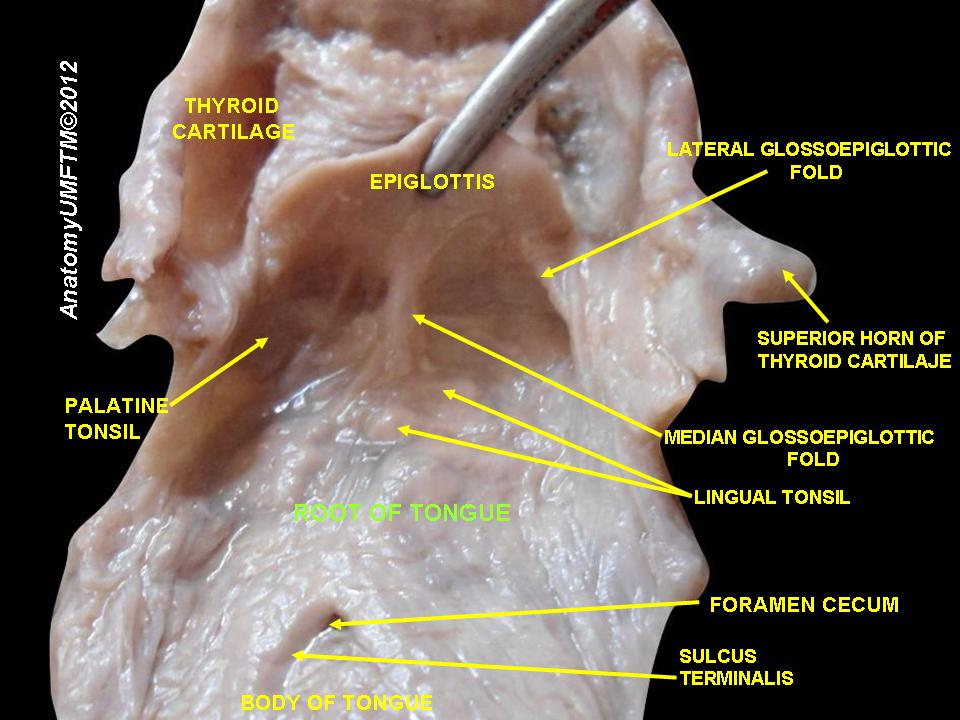
tongue root

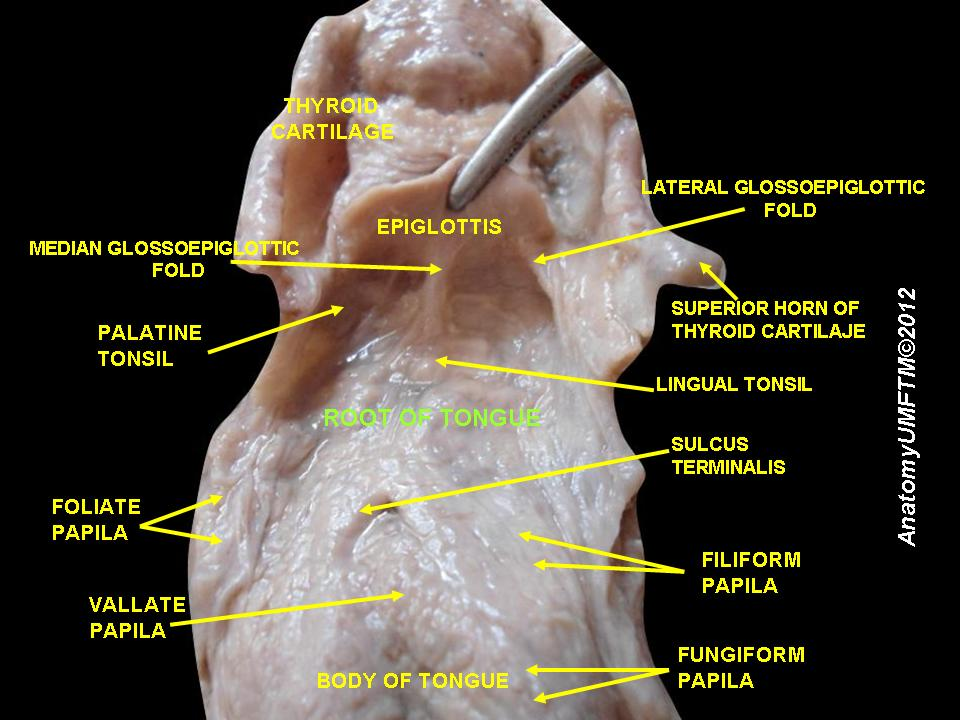
tongue root

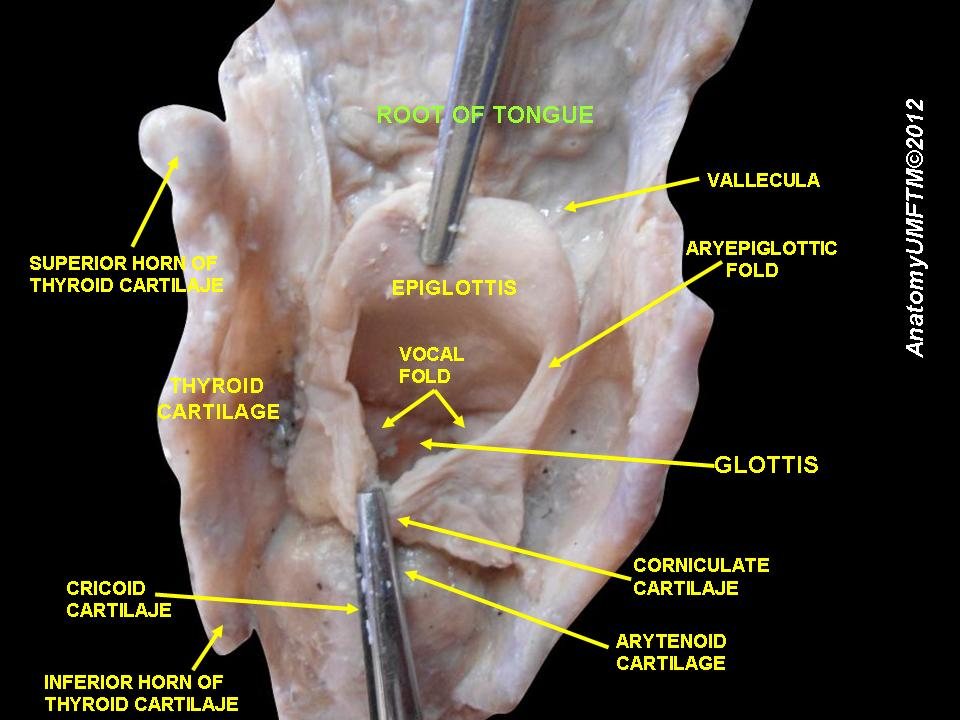
tongue root

== See also ==
- The back-vowel constraint, an effect of tongue-root retraction in some click consonants.

== Sources ==
- Ladefoged, Peter; Maddieson, Ian (1996). The Sounds of the World's Languages. Oxford: Blackwell.
