= Ebrié language =

Potou language spoken in West Africa

Ebrié
- Cama
- Pronunciation: [tʃamã]
- Native to: Ivory Coast
- Region: Abidjan
- Native speakers: 150,000 (2017)
- Language family: Niger–Congo?: Atlantic–Congo; Kwa; Potou–Tano; Potou; Ebrié

Language codes
- ISO 639-3: ebr
- Glottolog: ebri1238

Ebrié, or Cama (Caman, Kyama, Tchaman, Tsama, Tyama), is spoken by the Tchaman people in Ivory Coast and Ghana. It is a Potou language of the Kwa branch of the Niger–Congo family of languages.

== Phonology ==
=== Phonemic Inventory ===
Consonants
| | Labial | Alveolar | Palatal | Velar | Labio-velar |
|---|---|---|---|---|---|
| Fortis, voiceless | pʰ [pʰ] | tʰ [tʰ] | cʰ [cʰ, tʃ] | kʰ [kʰ] | |
| Fortis, voiced | b | d | ɟ [ɟ, dʒ] | g | gb [g͡b] |
| Lenis, voiceless | p [p, ɓ̥] | t [t, ɗ̥] | c [c, ʄ̊] | k [k, ɠ̊] | kp [k͡p, ɠ̊͡ɓ̥] |
| Lenis, voiced | ɓ [ɓ, m] | ɗ [ɗ, l, r, n] | j [j, ɲ] | | w [w, ŋʷ] |
| Fricatives | f, v | s, z | | h [x, h] | |

The sounds [v] and [z] are marginal and occur only in loanwords.

Vowels
| | Oral | | | Nasal | | |
|---|---|---|---|---|---|---|
| Close | i | | u | | | |
| Mid | e | | o | ɛ̃ | | ɔ̃ |
| Open | ɛ | a | ɔ | | ã | |

There are no nasal consonant phonemes in Ebrié. Instead, the nasal vowels cause the voiced lenis consonant series [ɓ, ɗ, j, w] to assimilate into [m, n, ɲ, ŋʷ].

=== Tones ===
Ebrié has two level tones (H and L) and a falling tone (HL). It also has floating tones, and the voiced fortis consonants have a tendency to lower the pitch of the low tone.

== Morphology ==
=== Nominal Prefixes ===
The noun class prefixes in Ebrié distinguish between certain homophones and between singular and plural forms. Originally, this system would have been more robust, as seen in other Niger-Congo languages.

The four nominal prefixes are á-, à-, ɛ̃́-, and ɛ̃̀-. The latter two, which are nasal vowels, can also be realized as syllabic nasals, transcribed as ɴ́- and ɴ̀- but written orthographically as <n>.

Nouns with Prefixes
| Prefix | Noun | Gloss |
|---|---|---|
| á- | áɓókʰà̃ | fog |
| à- | àlɔ̀kpɔ̀ | water turtle |
| ɛ̃́-, ɴ́- | ɴ́cʰwè | bone |
| ɛ̃̀-, ɴ̀- | ɴ̀tʰè | father |

The second noun in a compound retains its prefix, as shown below.

cámã́ + ńcã̀ → cámã́ǹcã̀
{the Ebriés} {} language {} {Ebrié language}

átɛ̃̀ + ńtʰù → ńtɛ̃̀ǹtʰù
fire {} sand {} ash

=== Plural Nouns ===
Nouns can be made plural through the use of nominal prefixes or plural suffixes. Certain nouns are irregular or invariable.

When a singular noun begins with the prefix á- or à-, its plural form will have the prefix ń- or ǹ- respectively. If a singular noun lacks a prefix, it will often have the prefix ń- in the plural. Other nouns take one of the plural suffixes -mã́, -hɔ̃̀, or -mã́hɔ̃̀.

- áyá /ájá/ 'tree' → ńyá /ńjá/ 'trees'
- agban /àg͡bã́/ 'plate' → ngbán /ǹg͡bã́/ 'plates
- lalabhô [làlàɓô] 'duck' → ńlalabho [ńlàlàɓô] 'ducks'
- mmanhɔn [m̀mã̀hɔ̀̃] 'mothers'
- nmyahɔn [ǹmjã̂hɔ̃̀] 'spouses'

=== Subject Pronouns ===
In Ebrié, tense/aspect/mood markers are found on the verb or as separate morphemes if the subject is a noun or a plural subject pronoun. The singular subject pronouns merge with the TAM markers, resulting in morphophonemic changes.

For exampleː

mɛ̃̀ + ɓâ → mã̀ã́
1SG {} FUT {} 1SG.FUT

Subject Pronouns
| | Singular | Plural |
|---|---|---|
| 1 | mɛ̃̀ | lò |
| 2 | ɛ̀ | ɔ̃́ |
| 3 | ã̀ | wò |

== Syntax ==
Ebrié is a SVO language, as seen in the following example.

jàjó étʰà kpã́hɔ̃̀
Yayo chew.PROG bread
'Yayo eats bread.'

== Orthography ==
Alphabet
| Symbol | IPA | Example | Transcription | Gloss |
|---|---|---|---|---|
| a | /a/ | áyá | /ájá/ | tree |
| an | /ã/ | áphán | /ápʰã́/ | smell |
| b | /b/ | bɔ | /bɔ̀/ | toad |
| bh | /ɓ/ | ábhwe | /áɓwè/ | canari |
| c | /c/ | kɔcɛn | /kɔ̀cɛ̃̀/ | bird |
| ch | /cʰ/ | chralá | [cʰràlá] | pangolin |
| d | /d/ | du | /dù/ | snake |
| e | /e/ | ńné | [ńné] | yam |
| ɛ | /ɛ/ | ádɛ́ | /ádɛ́/ | palm tree |
| ɛn | /ɛ̃/ | átɛn | /átɛ̃̀/ | fire |
| f | /f/ | áfɔn | [áfɔ̃̀] | branch |
| g | /g/ | gwe | /gwè/ | sea |
| gb | /g͡b/ | agbu | /àg͡bù/ | rifle |
| h | /h/ | áhɔn | /áhɔ̃̀/ | axe |
| i | /i/ | ḿbi | [ḿbì] | leaf |
| j | /ɟ/ | njɔn | [ǹɟɔ̃̀] | friends |
| k | /k/ | akran | [àkrã̀] | bottle |
| kh | /kʰ/ | ákhɔn | /ákʰɔ̃̀/ | spear |
| kp | /k͡p/ | ákpró | [ák͡pró] | hat |
| l | [l, ɗ] | álɛ | [álɛ̀] | tongue |
| m | [m] | mɛn | [mɛ̃̀] | I |
| n | [n] | nnwɛ | [nnwɛ̀] | snail |
| o | /o/ | ákhokho | /ákʰòkʰò/ | back |
| ɔ | /ɔ/ | awɔ́ | /àwɔ́/ | cat |
| ɔn | /ɔ̃/ | ácɔn | /ácɔ̃̀/ | fish |
| p | /p/ | ápɔ́ | [ápɔ́] | love |
| ph | /pʰ/ | lephan | [lèpʰã̀] | someone |
| r | [r] | ahran | [àhrã̀] | canoe |
| s | /s/ | sɛ | /sɛ̀/ | man |
| t | /t/ | áta | /átà/ | insult |
| th | /tʰ/ | átha | [átʰà] | war |
| u | /u/ | ńdu | [ńdù] | water |
| v | (v) | nvra | [ǹvrà] | appatam |
| w | /w/ | áwɔ́ | /áwɔ́/ | ten |
| y | /j/ | yɔ | /jɔ̃̀/ | good |
| z | /z/ | nzrɔ | [ǹzrɔ̀] | bag |

The high tone is marked with the acute accent (ájí 'respect'), and the low tone is left unmarked (aji 'clay'). The falling tone is marked with a circumflex (â).

The apostrophe (') is used to mark the habitual form of the verb.
