= Twi-Fante language =

Principal language of Akan lands in Ghana

Twi-Fante
- Akan
- Native to: Ghana
- Ethnicity: Akan
- Speakers: L1: 8.9 million (2013); L2: 1 million (no date)
- Language family: Niger–Congo?: Atlantic–Congo; Volta–Congo; Kwa; Potou–Tano; Tano; Akan; Twi-Fante
- Dialects: Asante; Akuapem; Fante; Bono; Wasa
- Writing system: Latin

Official status
- Official language in: None; Government-sponsored language of Ghana
- Regulated by: Akan Orthography Committee

Language codes
- ISO 639-1: ak
- ISO 639-2: aka
- ISO 639-3: aka – inclusive code Individual codes: twi – Twi fat – Fanti abr – Abron wss – Wasa
- Glottolog: akan1251 Akanic

A man speaking Asante Twi

Twi-Fante, commonly referred to by its speakers as either Twi (pronounced /ˈtʃwiː/) or Fante (/ˈfænti, ˈfɑːnti/) and academically and institutionally known by the broader term Akan (pronounced /əˈkæn/), is a widely spoken language of Ghana and the main native language of the Akan people. Spoken over much of the southern half of Ghana, about 44% of Ghanaians are native speakers, and about 80% of Ghana's population speak Akan as a first or second language. The Bono dialect is also widely spoken in Ghana and across the border in Ivory Coast.

Three dialects of Twi-Fante were developed as literary standards with distinct orthographies: Asante Twi, Akuapem Twi, and Fante. Despite being mutually intelligible, they were inaccessible in written form to speakers of the other standards until the Akan Orthography Committee (AOC)'s development of a common Twi-Fante orthography in 1978, based mainly on Akuapem dialect. As the first Akan variety to be used for Bible translation, Akuapem Twi had become the prestige dialect.

With the Atlantic slave trade, Akan languages, principally Twi/Fante, were introduced to the Caribbean and South America, notably in Suriname and Jamaica, where they heavily influenced the language of the Ndyuka and the Jamaican Maroons, also known as the Coromantee. The cultures of the descendants of escaped slaves in the interior of Suriname and the Maroons in Jamaica still retain Akan influences, including the Akan naming practice of naming children after the day of the week on which they are born, e.g. Akwasi/Kwasi for a boy or Akosua for a girl born on a Sunday, etc. In Jamaica and Suriname, the Ananse spider stories are still well-known.

== Name ==
Originally, the language was known by local names rather than a single unifying term. Inland Akan groups referred to it as 'Twi' (/tʃwiː, twiː, tʃiː/; Akan: [tɕᶣi]), while coastal Akan groups referred to it as 'Fante'. After independence, the national language commission adopted 'Akan', a name that had been used for all the languages spoken by the Akan people, which includes the Bia languages in addition to Twi-Fante, as a unitary name for Twi-Fante specifically. The broader scope was renamed Central Tano to avoid ambiguity. However, many sources still refer to all the languages spoken by the Akan people as 'Akan'.

== History ==
The largest Akan migration was to Ghana in successive waves between the 11th and 18th centuries. Smaller numbers migrated to the eastern part of Côte d'Ivoire and parts of Togo. Within Ghana, the Akan expanded from the north to occupy the southern forest and coastal areas during the 13th century. The Akans have a strong oral history tradition of their past and are also known in for symbolic artifacts of wood, metal and terracotta. Their cultural ideas are expressed in stories and proverbs as well as in designs such as symbols used in carvings and on clothes. The rich Akan culture and history in Ghana are areas of research for many disciplines, such as folklore, literary studies, linguistics, anthropology, and history.

== Dialects ==
Twi-Fante is a dialect continuum that is closely related to the Bia languages and the other Akan languages that are spoken by the Akan people. The relationships of the major Twi-Fante dialects are as follows:

- Twi‑Fante
  - - Brong Twi (a.k.a. Bono Twi; a dialect cluster)
    - Wasa (Amenfi, Fianse dialects)
  - - Asante-Akyem-Kwahu dialect
    - - Akuapem Twi
      - Fante (Agona, Gomua, Abura, Anomabu dialects)

Brong and Wasa have limited mutual intelligibility with each other, and so are separate languages by that standard. Neighboring Brong and Asante are mutually intelligible, though geographically more distant Brong and Fante are less so. Indeed, 'a Fante-speaker will be right in looking on Bron [Bono] as a different language.'

== Phonology ==
The Twi-Fante dialects contain extensive palatalization, vowel harmony, and tone terracing.

=== Consonants ===
Before front vowels, all Asante consonants are palatalized (or labio-palatalized), and the stops are to some extent affricated. The allophones of /n/ are quite complex. In the table below, palatalized allophones which involve more than minor phonetic palatalization are specified, in the context of the vowel /i/. These sounds do occur before other vowels, such as /a/, though in most cases not commonly.

In Asante, /ɡu/ followed by a vowel is pronounced /ɡʷ/, but in Akuapem it remains /ɡu/. The sequence /nh/ is pronounced [ŋŋ̊].

A word final /k/ can be heard as a glottal stop [ʔ]. There is also a nasalization of /h/ and of /j w/ as [h̃] and [j̃ w̃], when occurring before nasal vowels.

The transcriptions in the tables below are in the order /phonemic/, [phonetic]. Note that orthographic ⟨dw⟩ is ambiguous; in textbooks, ⟨dw⟩ = /ɡ/ may be distinguished from /dw/ with a diacritic: d̩w. Likewise, velar ⟨nw⟩ (ŋw) may be transcribed n̩w. Orthographic ⟨nu⟩ is palatalized [ɲᶣ].

Twi-Fante consonant phonemes
		Labial	Alveolar	Dorsal	Labialized
Nasal	plain	/m/	/n/		/nʷ/
Nasal	geminated		/nː/		/nːʷ/
Stop	voiceless	/p/	/t/	/k/	/kʷ/
Stop	voiced	/b/	/d/	/ɡ/	/ɡʷ/
Fricative		/f/	/s/	/h/	/hʷ/
Trill			/r/		
Approximant			/l/	/j/	/w/

Allophones of Twi-Fante consonants
		Labial	Alveolar		Dorsal		Labialized	
		Labial	Phoneme	Allophones	Phoneme	Allophones	Phoneme	Allophones
Nasal	plain	/m/	/n/	[n~ŋ, ɲ, ɲĩ]			/nʷ/	[ŋʷ, ɲᶣ]
Nasal	geminated		/nː/	[ŋː, ɲːĩ]			/nːʷ/	[ɲːᶣ]
Stop	voiceless	/p/	/t/	[t]	/k/	[k, tɕ~cç]	/kʷ/	[kʷ, tɕᶣ]
Stop	voiced	/b/	/d/		/ɡ/	[ɡ, dʑ~ɟʝ]	/ɡʷ/	[ɡʷ, dʑᶣ]
Fricative		/f/	/s/		/h/	[h, ɕ]	/hʷ/	[hʷ, ɕᶣ]
Trill			/r/	[ɾ, r, ɽ]				
Approximant			/l/		/j/		/w/	[w, ɥ]

Twi-Fante consonant orthography
		Labial	Alveolar	Dorsal	Labialized
Nasal	plain	⟨m⟩	⟨n, ny, ngi⟩		⟨nw, nu⟩
Nasal	geminated		⟨ng, nyi, nnyi⟩		⟨nnw⟩
Stop	voiceless	⟨p⟩	⟨t, ti⟩	⟨k, ky⟩	⟨kw, twi⟩
Stop	voiced	⟨b⟩	⟨d⟩	⟨g, dw, gy⟩	⟨gu, dwi⟩
Fricative		⟨f⟩	⟨s⟩	⟨h, hy⟩	⟨hu, hwi⟩
Trill			⟨r⟩		
Approximant			⟨l⟩	⟨y⟩	⟨w, wi⟩

=== Vowels ===
The Twi-Fante dialects have fourteen to fifteen vowels: four to five "tense" vowels (advanced tongue root; +ATR or −RTR), five "lax" vowels (retracted tongue root, +RTR or −ATR), which are not entirely contrastively represented by the seven-vowel orthography, and five nasal vowels, which are not represented at all. All fourteen were distinguished in the Gold Coast alphabet of the colonial era. A tongue-root distinction in orthographic a is only found in some subdialects of Fante, but not in the literary form; in Asante and Akuapem there are harmonic allophones of /a/, but neither is ATR. The two vowels written e (/e/ and /i̙/) and o (/o/ and /u̙/) are often not distinguished in pronunciation.

Twi-Fante vowel phonemes
	Front		Central		Back	
	−RTR	+RTR	−RTR	+RTR	−RTR	+RTR
Close	/i/	/i̙/			/u/	/u̙/
Mid	/e/	/e̙/			/o/	/o̙/
Open			/a/	/a̙/		

Orthog.	−RTR	+RTR
i	/i/ [i]	
e	/e/ [e]	/i̙/ [ɪ~e]
ɛ		/e̙/ [ɛ]
a	/a/ [æ~ɐ~ə]	/a̙/ [a]
ɔ		/o̙/ [ɔ]
o	/o/ [o]	/u̙/ [ʊ~o]
u	/u/ [u]	

==== Tongue root harmony ====
Twi-Fante vowels engage in a form of vowel harmony with the root of the tongue.

1. +RTR vowels followed by the −RTR non-mid vowels /i a u/ become −RTR. This is generally reflected in the orthography: That is, orthographic e ɛ a ɔ o become i e a o u. However, it is no longer reflected in the case of subject and possessive pronouns, giving them a consistent spelling. This rule takes precedence over the next one.
2. After the +RTR non-high vowels /e̙ a̙ o̙/, −RTR mid vowels /e o/ become +RTR high vowels /i̙ u̙/. This is not reflected in the orthography, for both sets of vowels are spelled ⟨e o⟩, and in many dialects this rule does not apply, for these vowels have merged.

=== Tones ===
Twi-Fante has three phonemic tones, high (/H/), mid (/M/), and low (/L/). Initial syllable may only be high or low.

==== Tone terracing ====
The phonetic pitch of the three tones depends on their environment, often being lowered after other tones, producing a steady decline known as tone terracing.

/H/ tones have the same pitch as a preceding /H/ or /M/ tone within the same tonic phrase, whereas /M/ tones have a lower pitch. That is, the sequences /HH/ and /MH/ have a level pitch, whereas the sequences /HM/ and /MM/ have a falling pitch. /H/ is lowered (downstepped) after a /L/.

/L/ is the default tone, which emerges in situations such as reduplicated prefixes. It is always at bottom of the speaker's pitch range, except in the sequence /HLH/, in which case it is raised in pitch but the final /H/ is still lowered. Thus /HMH/ and /HLH/ are pronounced with distinct but very similar pitches.

After the first "prominent" syllable of a clause, usually the first high tone, there is a downstep. This syllable is usually stressed.

== Morphology ==
=== Formation of plural nouns ===
Twi-Fante historically had a noun class system similar to that of Bantu languages. Although this system is now largely defunct, remnants of it persist in modern Twi-Fante plural formation, particularly through prefixes and suffixes. The current pluralisation system blends fossilised class prefixes with newer morphological strategies, especially for human nouns. Human nouns have preserved more elements of the old system than non-human nouns and can use multiple plural-marking strategies simultaneously.

In modern Twi-Fante, plural formation has shifted from a purely prefixal historical system to a mixed one using both prefixes and suffixes, with human nouns showing the most complex patterns.

==== Prefixal plural formation ====
Many Twi-Fante nouns form their plurals through the addition or replacement of nasal prefixes (m-, n-), a remnant of the old noun class system.

Singular	Plural
abɔfra "child"	mmɔfra "children"
aboa "animal"	mmoa "animals"
abusua "family"	mmusua "families"
abirekyie "goat"	mmirekyie "goats"
adaka "box"	nnaka "boxes"
adanko "rabbit"	nnanko "rabbits"
aduro "medicine"	nnuro "medicines"
kraman "dog"	nkraman "dogs"
kanea "light", "lamp"	nkanea "lights", "lamps"
safoa "key"	nsafoa "keys"

In this process, the original class prefix (typically a-) is replaced by a homorganic nasal prefix that assimilates to the initial consonant of the root word. For example, initial ab- becomes mm- and ad- becomes nn- in plural forms.

==== Suffixal plural formation ====
Plural suffixes are also used, primarily for human and agentive nouns. Human nouns show the most complex plural marking, frequently combining old prefixal and new suffixal methods.

With -nom

This suffix is used primarily for kinship and social role terms.

Singular	Plural
agya "father"	agyanom "fathers"
nana "grandparent"/"grandchild"	nananom "grandparents"/"grandchildren"
nua "sibling"	nuanom "siblings"
yere "wife"	yerenom "wives"

With -fo

This suffix is used with profession- or agent-based nouns.

Singular	Plural
ɔkyerɛkyerɛni "teacher"	akyerɛkyerɛfo "teachers"
odiyifo "prophet"	adiyifo "prophets"
ɔsɔfo "priest"	asɔfo "priests"
ɔbayifo "witch"	abayifo "witches"

In some cases, both a prefix and a suffix are used for pluralisation, especially with human nouns (e.g., onua → enuanom); human nouns thus show more complex plural marking than non-human nouns.

==== Invariant nouns ====
Certain Twi-Fante nouns remain unchanged in the plural. These invariant nouns, including mass nouns and inherently plural items, have lost plural marking entirely as the historical class system has simplified.

Singular / Plural
sika "money"
ani "eye"/"eyes"
nkyene "salt"/"salts"
nsuo "water"/"waters"

==== Historical noun classes ====
Twi-Fante originally had a more extensive system of noun classes marked by singular/plural prefixes. These may be reconstructed as follows:

Singular			Plural	
Class	Prefix	Typical domain	Class	Prefix
1	o-/ɔ-	Humans	5	n-
2	a-/e-	Humans, animals, instruments	6	a-/e-
3	i-/e-	Inanimates		
4	ɛ-	Inanimates		

Over time, this class system has broken down. Modern Twi-Fante lacks productive class agreement between nouns and adjectives or verbs, and many prefixes have become fossilised elements reanalysed as part of the noun stem.

== Orthography ==
Uppercase	A	B	D	E	Ɛ	F	G	H	I	K	L	M	N	O	Ɔ	P	R	S	T	U	W	Y
Lowercase	a	b	d	e	ɛ	f	g	h	i	k	l	m	n	o	ɔ	p	r	s	t	u	w	y

The letters C, J, Q, V, X and Z are also used, but only in loanwords.

== Literature ==
The Akan languages have a rich literature in proverbs, folktales, and traditional drama, as well as a new literature in dramas, short stories, and novels. This literature began to be documented in written form in the late 1800s. Later, Joseph Hanson Kwabena Nketia collected a number of proverbs and folktales, including Funeral Dirges of the Akan People (1969), Folk Songs of Ghana (1963), and Akan Poetry (1958). Some of the important authors in the language are A. A. Opoku (dramatist), E. J. Osew (dramatist), K. E. Owusu (novelist), and R. A. Tabi (dramatist and novelist). The Bureau of Ghana Languages has been unable to continue printing novels in the language, and the following are out of print: Obreguo, Okrabiri, Afrakoma, Obeede, Fia Tsatsala, and Ku Di Fo Nanawu.

== Education ==
=== Primary ===
In 1978 the AOC established a unified "Akan" orthography for Twi-Fante, which is used as the medium of instruction in primary school. Literacy in Twi-Fante is counted toward general literacy, from at least the lower primary level (primary 1–3).

=== University ===
Twi-Fante is studied at several major universities in the United States, including Ohio University, Ohio State University, University of Wisconsin-Madison, Harvard University, Boston University, Indiana University, University of Michigan, and The University of Florida. Twi-Fante has been a regular African language of study in the annual Summer Cooperative African Languages Institute (SCALI) program. The Twi-Fante language is studied in these universities as a bachelor or masters program.

== Vocabulary ==
=== Common phrases ===
English	Twi/Fante
Welcome	Akwaaba
Yes	Aane (Asante); Nyew (Fante); Yiw (Akuapem)
Okay/Alright	Yoo
No/Nope	Oho/Anhã (Fante); Daabi (Asante)
Good night	Da yie (Asante) literally "sleep well"
I'm going to sleep	Me rekɔ da (Fante)
How's it going?/How are you?	Ɛte sɛn? (Asante) could also be used in the non-literal sense as "hello"
Thank you	Medaase
Please/Excuse me/I beg your pardon	Mepa wo kyɛw
Song(s)/Music	Ndwom (Fante); Nnwom (Asante)
What is your name?	Wo din de sɛn?/Yɛfrɛ wo sɛn? (Asante); Wo dzin dze dεn? (Fante)
My name is.../I'm called...	Me dzin dze.../Wɔfrɛ me... (Fante)
How old is he/she?	Woedzi mfe ahen? (Fante)
How old are you?	Edzi mfe ahen (Fante)
Where is it?	Ɔwɔ hen?
I am going/I am taking my leave	Me rekɔ
Good	Mbo (Fante); Mmo (Asante)
Leave	Jo (Fante); Kɔ (Asante)
Well done	Ayɛ adze (Fante)
Stop	Gyae
Sleep	Da
Come	Bra
Come here	Bra ha
Come and eat	Bɛ didi

=== Placenames ===
English	Twi/Fante
Home	Fie
School	Sukuu
Church	Asɔre
Market	Dwaaso
University/Tertiary institution	Sukuupon
Hospital	Ayaresabea

== System of given names ==
The Akan people use a common naming system of giving the first name to a child, based on the day of the week that the child was born. Most of the nations in Ghana have a similar custom, which extends to neighboring countries.

Day		Male name	Female name
English	Twi/Fante	Male name	Female name
Monday	Dwoada	Kwadwo, Kojo	Adwoa
Tuesday	Benada	Kwabena, Kobina	Abena
Wednesday	Wukuada	Kweku, Kwaku	Akua
Thursday	Yawoada	Yaw, Kwaw	Yaa
Friday	Fiada	Kofi	Afia/Afua
Saturday	Memeneda	Kwame	Ama
Sunday	Kwasiada	Akwasi, Kwasi, Kwesi	Asi, Akosua, Esi

== Bibliography ==
- Dolphyne, Florence Abena (January 1986). "The languages of the Akan peoples". Research Review. 2 (1). University of Ghana. Institute of African Studies: 1–22. ISSN 0855-4412.
- Dolphyne, F. A. (1988). "The Volta–Comoé Languages". In Kropp Dakubu, Mary Esther (ed.). The Languages of Ghana. London: Kegan Paul International for the International African Institute. ISBN 978-0710302106.
- Obeng, Samuel Gyasi (2000). "Vowel harmony and tone in Akan toponyms". Studies in the Linguistic Sciences. 30 (2): 173–183.
- Osam, Emmanuel Kweku Ahen (1994). Aspects of Akan Grammar: A Functional Perspective (PhD thesis). Eugene, OR: University of Oregon.
- Schacter, Paul (1968). A Phonology of Akan: Akuapem, Asante, Fante. Los Angeles: University of California Press.
