= Krobu language =

Tano language of Ivory Coast

Krobu
- Native to: Ivory Coast
- Native speakers: (9,900 cited 1993)
- Language family: Niger–Congo?: Atlantic–Congo; Kwa; Potou–Tano; Tano; Krobu

Language codes
- ISO 639-3: kxb
- Glottolog: krob1245

Krobu (Krobou) is a Tano language (Kwa, Niger–Congo) of Ivory Coast.

== Phonology ==
Consonants
	Labial	Alveolar	Palatal	Velar	Labiovelar
Plosive	p b	t d	c ɟ	k g	kp gb
Fricative	f v	s z	ʃ ʒ	x ɣ	
Nasal	m	n	ɲ	ŋ	ŋm
Approximant	w	r, l	j, ɥ		

Vowels
	Front	Central	Back
High	i ĩ		u ũ
Near-high			ʊ
Mid-high	e		o
Mid-low	ɛ ɛ̃		ɔ ɔ̃
Low		a ã	

Additionally, Krobu has seven tones; high, mid, low, rising, falling, low-rising, and low-falling.
