= Fante dialect =

Dialect of Akan in Ghana

Fante
- Fante
- Native to: Ghana
- Ethnicity: Fante people
- Native speakers: 2.8 million (2013)
- Language family: Niger–Congo?: Atlantic–Congo; Volta–Congo; Kwa; Potou–Tano; Tano; Akan; Twi-Fante; (core); Akuapem–Fante; Fante

Official status
- Regulated by: Akan Orthography Committee

Language codes
- ISO 639-2: fat
- ISO 639-3: fat (see [aka] for Ethnologue description)
- Glottolog: fant1241

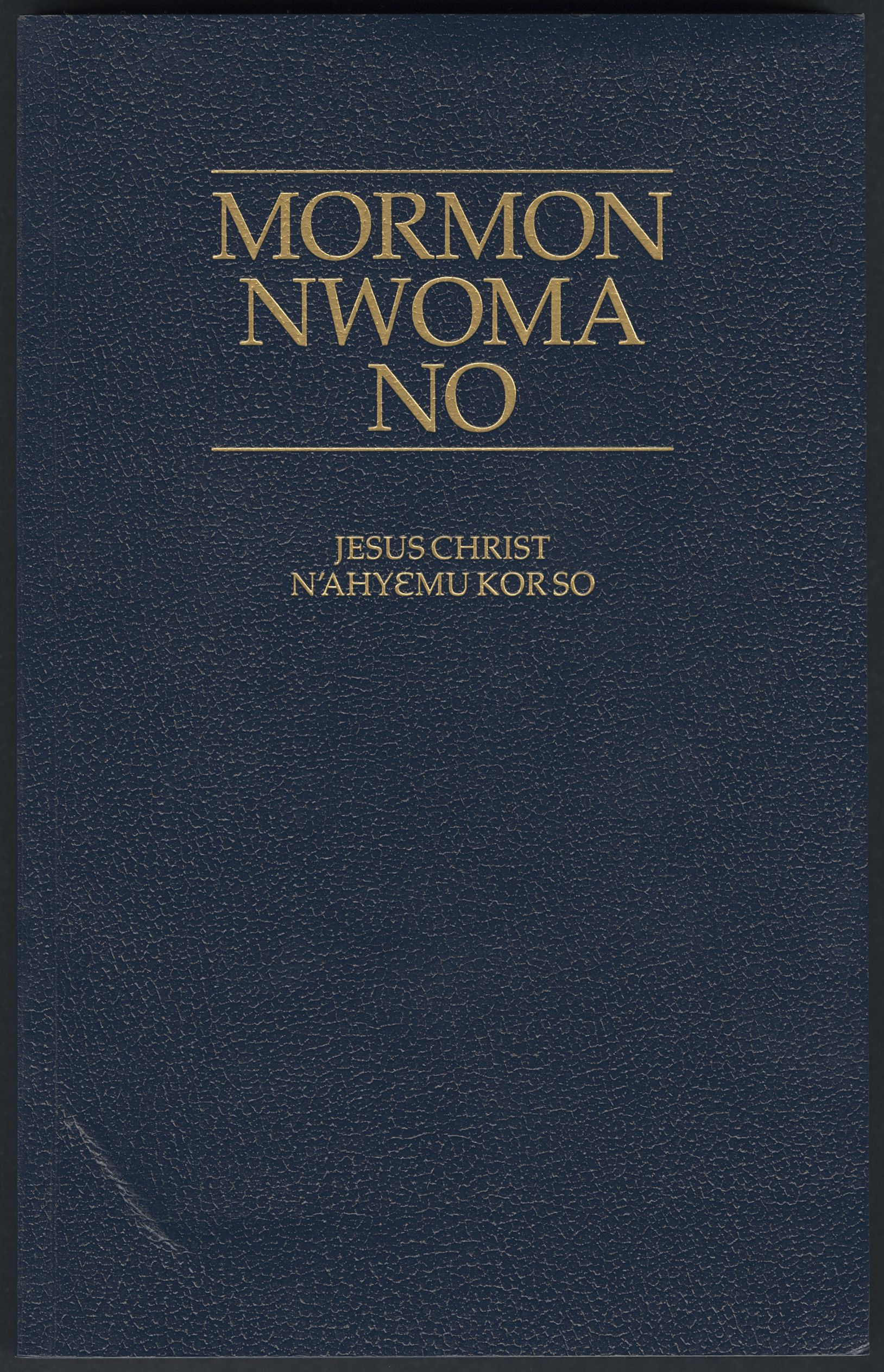
Fante translation of the Book of Mormon; note the use of the Latin epsilon in the word N'AHYƐMU.

Fante (Fanti: [ˈfɑnti]), also known as Fanti, Fantse, or Mfantse, is one of the three literary dialects of the Twi-Fante language, along with Asante and Akuapem Twi, with which it is mutually intelligible. It is principally spoken in the central and southern regions of Ghana as well as in settlements in other regions in western Ghana.

Fante is the common dialect of the Fante people, whose communities each have their own subdialects, namely Agona, Anomabo, Abura and Gomoa, all of which are mutually intelligible. Schacter and Fromkin describe two main Fante dialect groups: Fante 1, which uses a syllable-final /w/ and thus distinguishes kaw ("dance") and ka ("bite"); and Fante 2, where these words are homophonous. A standardized form of Fante is taught in primary and secondary schools. Many Fantes are bilingual or bidialectal and most can speak Asante.

Notable speakers include Cardinal Peter Appiah Turkson, Jane Naana Opoku-Agyemang, former United Nations Secretary General Kofi Annan, and former Ghanaian presidents Kwame Nkrumah and John Atta Mills. Maya Angelou learned Fante as an adult during her stay in Ghana.

Today Fante is spoken by more than 6 million people in Ghana primarily in the Central and Western Regions. It is also widely spoken in Tema, where majority of the people in that city are native Fante speakers who were settled after the new port was built.

One striking characteristic of the Fante dialect is its level of adaptability due to British colonial influence and "to fill lexical and semantic gaps, for reasons of simplicity. Examples of such borrowings include rɛkɔso ("records"), rɔba "rubber", nɔma ("number"), kolapuse "collapse", and dɛkuleti "decorate". Native names are occasionally anglicized, such as "Mεnsa" becoming "Mensah" or "Atta" becoming "Arthur".

== Etymology ==
The name "Fante" has different proposed origins.

The first and most widely accepted explanation comes from oral tradition. It holds that the Fante people separated from the other Akan groups around 1250 AD in the area now known as Brong Ahafo. Their departure is believed to have given rise to the name Fante, derived from the phrase "Fa-atsew" meaning "the half that left". This split is believed to have occurred at a place called Krako, present day Techiman in the Bono East Region of Ghana. From this point, the Fante developed as a distinct Akan group. The Fante people were led by three great warriors known as Obrumankoma, the whale; Odapagyan, the eagle; and Oson, the elephant. These names continue to hold cultural and symbolic importance among the Fante.

The second explanation suggests that the name Fante comes from a difference in food habits between them and Asante. According to this version, the Fante were known for eating spinach, called efan, while the Asante ate another herb known as san.

This theory is not only inconsistent in linguistics but also historically flawed. The Asante did not emerge as a major political force until the late seventeenth century, by which time the Fante were already established and known. The contrast between Fante and Asante identities only began to develop in the latter part of the eighteenth century, making any connection between the name Fante and the Asante anachronistic. For these reasons, the first origin story is considered more reliable, both in terms of language and historical accuracy.

== Phonology ==
=== Consonants ===
		Labial		Alveolar		(Alveolo-) palatal		Velar		Glottal	
		plain	lab.	plain	lab.	plain	lab.	plain	lab.	plain	lab.
Nasal		m		n	nʷ	ɲ	ɲʷ				
Plosive	voiceless	p	pʷ	t	tʷ			k	kʷ	ʔ	
Plosive	voiced	b	bʷ	d	dʷ			ɡ	gʷ		
Affricate	voiceless			ts		tɕ	tɕʷ [tɕᶣ]				
Affricate	voiced			dz		dʑ	dʑʷ [dʑᶣ]				
Fricative		f		s	sʷ	ɕ	ɕʷ [ɕᶣ]			h	hʷ
Approximant				r		j			w		

=== Vowels ===
	Front	Central	Back
Close	i		u
Near-close	ɪ		ʊ
Close-mid	e		o
Open-mid	ɛ		ɔ
Open		a	

Of these vowels, five may be nasalized: /ĩ/, /ɪ̃/, /ã/, /ũ/, and /ʊ̃/.

Fante exhibits vowel harmony, where all vowels in a word belong to one of the two sets /i e o u a/ or /ɪ ɛ ɔ ʊ a/.

=== Tones ===
Fante, like all other varieties of Twi-Fante, has two contrastive tones, high tone (H) and low tone (L).

== Orthography ==
Fante has a relatively phonemic orthography. It uses the following letters to indicate the following phonemes:

Uppercase	A	B	D	E	Ɛ	F	G	H	I	K	L	M	N	O	Ɔ	P	R	S	T	U	W	Y	Z
Lowercase	a	b	d	e	ɛ	f	g	h	i	k	l	m	n	o	ɔ	p	r	s	t	u	w	y	z
Phoneme	/a/	/b/	/d/	/e/, /ɪ/	/ɛ/	/f/	/g/	/h/	/i/	/k/	/l/	/m/	/n/	/o/, /ʊ/	/ɔ/	/p/	/r/	/s/	/t/	/u/	/w/	/j/	/z/

=== Consonants ===
Fante makes heavy use of digraphs, including ky (/tɕ/), gy (/dʑ/), hy (/ɕ/), tw (/tɕʷ/), dw (/dʑʷ/), hw (/ɕʷ/), and kw (/kʷ/). However, labialization is symbolized in other labialized consonants either with ⟨u⟩, e.g. pue (/pʷei/), bue (/bʷei/), tue (/tʷei/), hue (/hʷei/), huan (/hʷan/), guan (/gʷan/), nua (/nʷia/), and sua (/sʷia/); or with ⟨o⟩, e.g. soer (/sʷer/), soe (/sʷei/), and noa (/nʷia/). Furthermore, the digraphs ny and nw may represent /ɲ/ and /ɲʷ/, respectively, as in nya (/ɲa/) ("get"), and nwin (/ɲʷin/) ("leak"), parallelling the use of other digraphs in Fante; or they may represent two individual phonemes, /nj/ and /nw/ respectively, as in nwaba (/nwaba/) "snail".

Fante also uses the digraphs ts and dz, which represent /ts/ and /dz/ in Fante subdialects that distinguish the plosives /t/ and /d/ and the affricates /ts/ and /dz/, but are allophonic with t and d in those subdialects which do not distinguish them. Fante is the only dialect of Twi-Fante to distinguish /ts/ and /dz/ from /t/ and /d/, and is therefore the only dialect whose alphabet contains the letter ⟨z⟩.

=== Vowels ===
Although ⟨e⟩ and ⟨o⟩ can represent multiple phonemes each, Fante orthography uses two strategies to distinguish them. First, Fante vowel harmony means /e/ and /ɪ/ are not likely to appear together in a word, nor are /o/ and /ʊ/. Second, if disambiguation is necessary, vowel digraphs may be used: ⟨ie⟩ to mean /e/ and ⟨uo⟩ to mean /o/. Thus /moko/ "pepper" is spelled muoko, while /mʊkʊ/ "I sit" is spelled muko.

Nasalization is marked with the diacritic ⟨ ̃⟩, but is only used when distinguishing "one of two or more words of the same spelling but different meanings which contain a nasal vowel", and is omitted when there is no danger of ambiguity. The diacritic may also be included on the wrong vowel, as in the word kẽka, where it is the second syllable that actually receives the nasalization.
