= Akan Orthography Committee =

Organization developing standard Akan

The Akan Orthography Committee (AOC) was founded for the promotion of the Akan language and has since created a standard dialect for Akan.

== Orthography ==
A standardized writing and orthographic writing system for Akan was completed by the Akan Orthography Committee (AOC) in 1968. Akan languages started to be written down mainly in religious publications by Danish, German and British missionaries during the 17th and 18th centuries. The unified Akan orthography was created during the 1980s.

In 1978 the Akan Orthography Committee established a common orthography for all of Akan, which is used as the medium of instruction in primary school.

== See also ==
- Bureau of Ghana Languages
- Adinkra symbols
