= Mzungu =

East African term for a white person

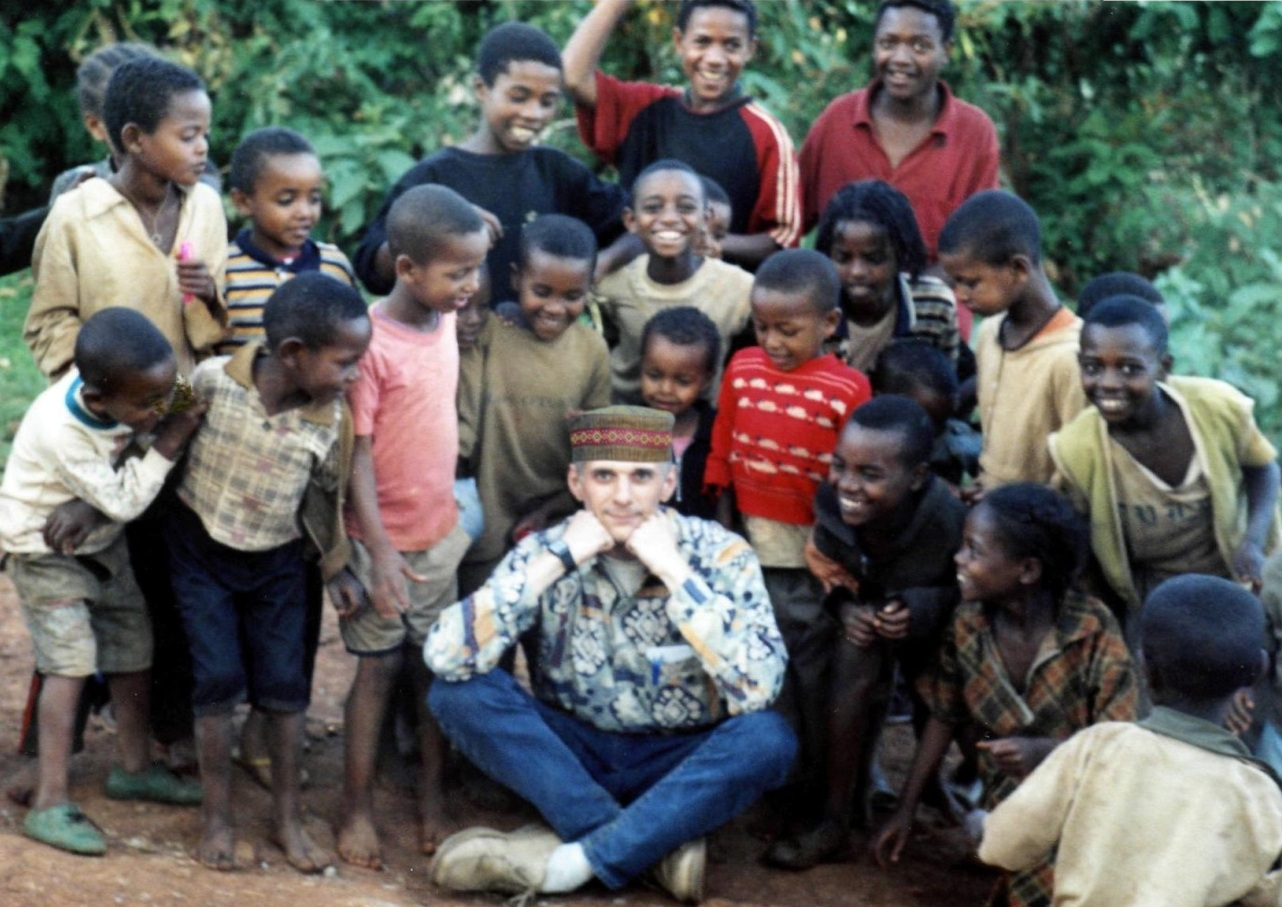
Russian traveller in Africa.

Mzungu (pronounced [m̩ˈzuŋɡu]), also known as muzungu, mlungu, musungu or musongo, is a Bantu word that means "wanderer" originally pertaining to the first European explorers to the East African region whom the local ethnic groups thought were traveling aimlessly with no goals to settle, conquer or trade, like restless spirits – the initial explorers who unbeknownst to the local tribes, were tasked with mapping the area, travel and trade routes, key landmarks like the source of the river Nile as well as documenting dominant kingdoms and forging some alliances that were then later used by missionaries and colonialists in their conquest.

The term is currently used in predominantly Swahili speaking nations to refer to foreign people dating back to 18th century. The noun mzungu or its variants are used in Kenya, Tanzania, Uganda, Malawi, Rwanda, Burundi, the Democratic Republic of the Congo, the Comoros, South Africa, Zimbabwe, Mayotte, Zambia and in the north of Madagascar (the word changed to vozongo in Malagasy, but locals will still understand the word mzungu) dating back to the 18th century.

== Etymology ==
Literally translated mzungu meant "someone who roams around" or "wanderer". The term was first used in Africa to describe Arab, Indian and European traders and explorers in the 18th century, apparently because they moved around aimlessly. The word mzungu comes from Swahili, where zungu or zunguka is the word for spinning around on the same spot. Kizunguzungu is Swahili for dizziness. The term is now used to refer to "someone with white skin" or "white skin", but can be used to refer to all foreigners more generally. The word mzungu in Swahili can also mean someone who speaks English.

The possessive kizungu (or chizungu) translates as "behaving rich". However, in some areas, such as in Rwanda and Burundi, it does not necessarily refer to the colour of one's skin. Traditionally, Europeans were seen to be people of means and rich and so the terminology was extended to denote affluent persons regardless of race. It would therefore not be unusual to find any employer being referred to as mzungu. In the Bantu Swahili language, the plural form of mzungu is wazungu. The plural form may be used to confer a respect, such as the use of the term azungu to refer to individual foreigners in Malawi's Chichewa language. The possessive kizungu (or chizungu) translated literally means "of the wanderers". It has now come to mean "language of the wanderers" and more commonly English, as it is the language most often used by wazungu in the African Great Lakes area. However it can be used generally for any European language. Wachizungu, bachizungu, etc. – literally "wandering people" – have come to mean people who adopt the Western culture, cuisine and lifestyle.

== Everyday use ==
Mzungu can be used in an affectionate or insulting way. It is used in Kenya, Tanzania, Uganda, Rwanda, Malawi, Zambia, Zimbabwe and Burundi. It is often called out by children to get the attention of a passerby. For example, in Malawi, it is common for people to use the casual greeting Azungu boh! to individuals or groups of foreigners.

Regional variations
Language	Singular	Plural	Possessive
Swahili in the African Great Lakes	Mzungu	Wazungu	Kizungu
Shikomori in the Comoros	Mzungu	Wazungu	Chizungu
Luganda in Uganda	Omuzungu	Abazungu	Kizungu
Chichewa in Malawi	Mzungu	Azungu	Chizungu
Chinyanja in Zambia	Mzungu	Bazungu	Chizungu
Kikuyu in Kenya	Mūthūngū	Athūngū	Gīthūngū
Kinyarwanda in Rwanda / Kirundi in Burundi	Umuzungu	Abazungu	Ikizungu
Bemba in Zambia and the Democratic Republic of the Congo	Musungu	Basungu	Chisungu
Gusii in Kenya	Omusongo	Abasongo	Ebisongo
Sena in Mozambique	Muzungu	Azungu	
Shona in Zimbabwe	Murungu	Varungu	Chirungu
Xhosa in South Africa	Umlungu	Abelungu	Isilungu
Zulu in South Africa	Umlungu	Abelungu	Isilungu
Luguru in Tanzania	Imzungu	Iwazungu	

== See also ==
- Gringo
