= Potou–Tano languages =

Potou–Tano
- Potou–Akanic
- Geographic distribution: Ivory Coast, Ghana, and Togo
- Linguistic classification: Niger–Congo?: Atlantic–Congo; Volta-Congo; Kwa; Potou–Tano
- Subdivisions: Potou; Tano

Language codes
- Glottolog: poto1254

The Potou–Tano or Potou–Akanic languages are the only large, well-established branch of the Kwa family. They have been partially reconstructed historically by Stewart in 1989 and 2002.

== Languages ==
The Potou branch consists of two minor languages of Ivory Coast, Ebrié and Mbato. The Tano branch includes the major languages of SE Ivory Coast and southern Ghana, Baoulé and Akan.

- Potou–Tano
  - Potou (Potu)
    - Ebrié
    - Mbato
  - Tano (Akanic)
    - Krobu
    - West Tano: Abure, Eotile
    - Akan a.k.a. Central Tano (the Bia and Twi-Fante languages)
    - Guang

== See also ==
- Proto-Potou-Akanic reconstructions (Wiktionary)
