= Dominique Aplogan =

Beninese politician

Minister of Transport and Posts and Telecommunications
- In office May 16, 1967 – December 17, 1967
- President: Christophe Soglo
- Preceded by: Marcel Dadjo
- Succeeded by: Issa Raïmi Lawani

Minister delegated to the President in charge of Defence
- In office March 30, 1967 – May 6, 1967
- President: Christophe Soglo
- Preceded by: Philippe Aho
- Succeeded by: Christophe Soglo

Minister of Posts and Telecommunications
- In office September 11, 1963 – October 28, 1963
- President: Hubert Maga
- Preceded by: Victorien Gbaguidi
- Succeeded by: Hubert Maga

Secretary of State in charge of African and Malagasy Affairs
- In office November 16, 1962 – September 1, 1963
- President: Hubert Maga
- Preceded by: Office established

Deputy to the Legislative Assembly
- In office April 2, 1959 – December 11, 1960
- Prime Minister: Hubert Maga (Note: Hubert Maga was head of state and Prime Minister until December 11, 1960, when he was elected President of Dahomey.)

Territorial Councillor to the General Council
- In office January 5, 1947 – March 30, 1952
- Preceded by: Office established

Personal details
- Born: April 25, 1913 Abomey, Dahomey
- Died: November 3, 1989 (aged 76)
- Party: DPU; APB
- Education: William Ponty school
- Profession: Physician
- Awards: Officer of the National Order of Dahomey (1963); Grand Officer of the National Order of Dahomey (1967)

Dominique Aplogan (April 25, 1913 – November 3, 1989) was a Beninese physician and political figure most active when his country was known as Dahomey.

== Biography ==
Dominique Aplogan was born on April 25, 1913, in Abomey in Dahomey to an influential chiefly family. He attended William Ponty school in Senegal and subsequently became a physician.

Moving back to Dahomey to practice his profession, Dominique Aplogan quickly entered politics. He ran under the label of the Dahomeyan Progressive Union for the first Territorial Council elections of his country and was elected on January 5, 1947. He failed to be re-elected in 1952 but became Deputy in 1959 for the last legislative elections under French supervision before the independence of Dahomey.

In the meantime, he was Émile Poisson’s running mate, leader of the list of the African People's Bloc, in the French legislative elections of 1951 but both lost out to Sourou-Migan Apithy of the List of the French Union and Hubert Maga of the Ethnic Group of the North who became the two deputies of Dahomey at the French National Assembly. (Note: Sourou Migan Apithy's running mate was Édouard Dunglas and Hubert Maga's one was René Deroux.)

Despite his political commitment, Dominique Aplogan never stopped practicing his professional activity and was promoted on March 28, 1962, as chief physician of the Cotonou medical district. A few months later, Hubert Maga asked him to join his government, first as Secretary of State in charge of African and Malagasy Affairs on November 16, 1962, then as Minister of Posts and Telecommunications from September 11 to October 28, 1963 when Colonel Christophe Soglo took control of the country to prevent a civil war. The latter appointed him, on March 30, 1967, Minister delegated to the President in charge of Defence, then on May 16 of the same year, Minister of Transport and Posts and Telecommunications until a new military putsch on December 17, 1967. Dominique Aplogan was replaced by Captain Issa Raïmi Lawani.

Dominique Aplogan died on November 3, 1989.

== Awards and honors ==
- Officer of the National Order of Dahomey
- Grand Officer of the National Order of Dahomey
