= 1960 Dahomeyan general election =

- 11 December 1960
- Registered: 971,012
- Turnout: 70.98%
- Presidential election
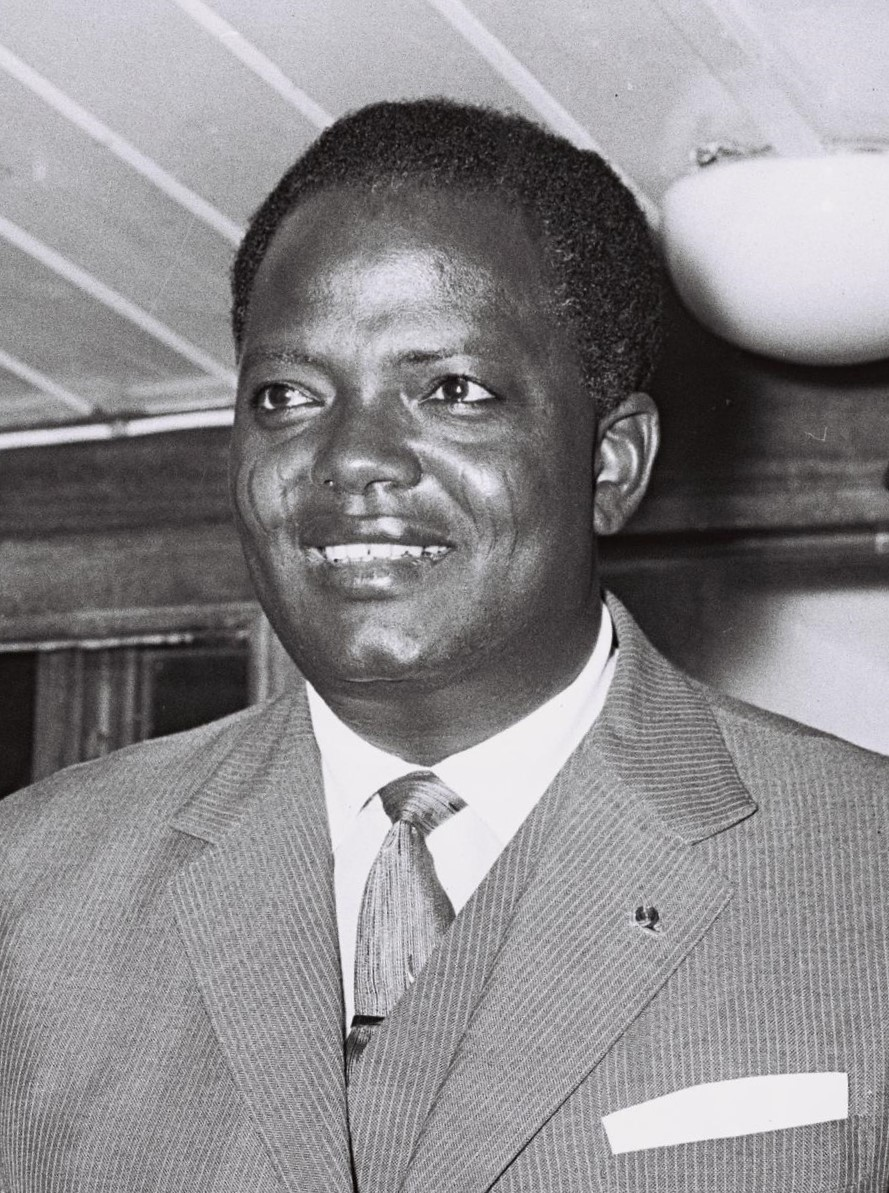

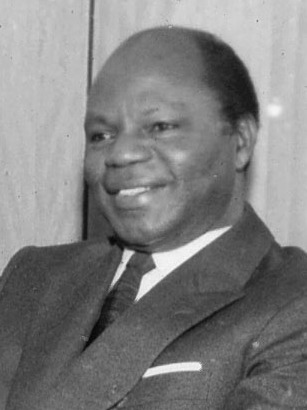
Candidate	Hubert Maga	Justin Ahomadégbé
Party	PDU	UDD
Running mate	Sourou-Migan Apithy	Sacca Koto Ngobi
Popular vote	468,679	213,572
Percentage	68.70%	31.30%
President before election
Office established
Elected President
Hubert Maga
PDU
- Parliamentary election
Party	Vote %	Seats	+/–
PDU	68.70	60	+10
This lists parties that won seats. See the complete results below.
List results by department

General elections were held in the Republic of Dahomey on 11 December 1960. According to the electoral law passed by the National Assembly, each party submitted a list of candidates for president, vice-president and all 60 National Assembly seats. The list that received the most votes would secure all offices.

The Dahomeyan Unity Party (PDU), a merger of the Dahomeyan Democratic Rally and the Dahomey Nationalist Party, ran a list led by Hubert Maga and Sourou-Migan Apithy. The opposing Dahomeyan Democratic Union ran a list led by Justin Ahomadégbé-Tomêtin and Sacca Koto Ngobi. The PDU list received 68% of the vote, resulting in Maga winning the presidency and the PDU taking all seats in the National Assembly. Voter turnout was 71%.

Following the elections, Dahomey effectively became a one-party state. In April 1961 the opposition newspaper DahoMatin was banned and the UDD was dissolved by presidential decree. On 27 May a supposed plot to assassinate Maga and his ministers was "uncovered", leading to the arrest of Ahomadegbe and two former UDD members who had helped him rally trade-union support in 1956–1957. Maga's government was ultimately unsuccessful in its consolidation of power and was overthrown by Christophe Soglo in 1963.

== Background ==
Shortly after independence, all parties — the UDD, RDD, PND and National Liberation Movement (MLN) — formed the Front d'Action Patriotique (Patriotic Action Front, FAP) parliamentary group, recognizing the need for national unity in order to address the problems of the new state, and passing a new electoral law. Members of the MLN later joined the RDD, revitalizing it and giving political substance to a party that had previously been little more than an "expression of a vague regionalism." The strengthened RDD then sought admission into the Rassemblement Démocratique Africain (RDA) with the support of Félix Houphouët-Boigny. This move brought the RDD into conflict with the UDD, which regarded itself as the official Dahomeyan branch of the RDA.

Ahomadegbe sought to form a single national party, and with the help of Houphouet, attempted to convince Maga to join Ahomadegebe. In mid-October, the RDD congress proposed Maga as the coalition candidate for the presideny in the approaching elections, prompting the UDD to reject the coalition idea entirely. As Ahomadegbe intended the new party to be his, the UDD made the dissolution of the RDD and the individual integration of its members into the new party a condition for a union, which would've effectively neutralized the RDD's organizational power. These terms were unacceptable to the RDD.

Frustrated with both Maga and Houphouet, UDD leaders called a general strike at the end of October and introduced a motion of censure against the government, accusing it of worsening social conditions and failing to propose a meaningful development plan, particularly regarding labor welfare. While the strike proved effective, the motion of censure was defeated by a surprise alliance between the RDD and Apithy's PND, which resulted in the expulsion of UDD members from the government. On 13 November the alliance formally merged into a single party with Maga at its head. Its platform included support for Dahomey's participation in the African solidarity movement, specifically of its membership in the Conseil de l'Entente, commitments to rational planning and economic austerity, and reforming the objectives and methods of the labor movement.

== Results ==
Party	Votes	%	Seats	+/–
Dahomeyan Unity Party	468,679	68.70	60	+10
Dahomeyan Democratic Union	213,572	31.30	0	–20
Total	682,251	100.00	60	–10
Valid votes	682,251	98.99		
Invalid/blank votes	6,982	1.01		
Total votes	689,233	100.00		
Registered voters/turnout	971,012	70.98		
Source: Nohlen et al.
