= Justin Ahomadégbé-Tomêtin =

Leader of Benin in 1965 and 1972 (1917–2002)

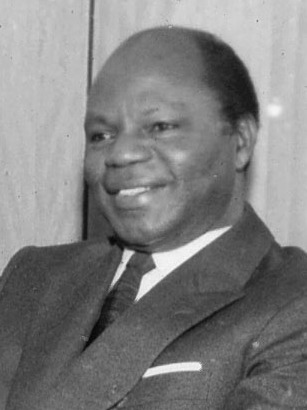
- Ahomadégbé-Tomêtin in 1964

Chairman of the Presidential Council of Dahomey
- In office May 7, 1972 – October 26, 1972
- Preceded by: Hubert Maga
- Succeeded by: Mathieu Kérékou

Provisional President of Dahomey
- Acting; November 27, 1965 – November 29, 1965
- Preceded by: Sourou-Migan Apithy
- Succeeded by: Tahirou Congacou (acting)

Premier of Dahomey
- In office January 25, 1964 – November 29, 1965
- President: Sourou-Migan Apithy; Himself (acting)
- Preceded by: Office re-stablished
- Succeeded by: Office abolished

Personal details
- Born: January 16, 1917 Abomey, Dahomey
- Died: March 8, 2002 (aged 85) Cotonou, Benin

Justin Ahomadegbé-Tomêtin (January 16, 1917 – March 8, 2002) was a Beninese politician most active when his country was known as Dahomey. He arose on a political scene where one's power was dictated by what region of Dahomey one lived in. He served as president of the National Assembly of Dahomey from April 1959 to November 1960 and as prime minister and vice president of Dahomey from 1964 to 1965.

Ahomadégbé became president of the Presidential Council, which was a system that rotated the office between three leading political figures: Ahomadégbé, Hubert Maga, and Sourou-Migan Apithy. Maga peacefully handed power to Ahomadégbé on May 7, 1972. On October 26, 1972, he was overthrown in a coup d'état led by Mathieu Kérékou. All three remained under house arrest until 1981.

== Early life and entry into politics ==
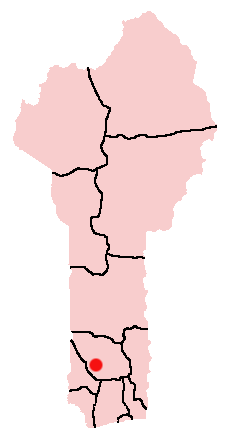
Location of Abomey in Benin

Ahomadégbé-Tomêtin was born on January 16, 1917, a direct descendant of the kings of Abomey, the town of his birth. He attended the École William Ponty and the French West Africa School of Medicine in Dakar. He served in the French Army for a short while, where he attained the rank of sergeant. After his short military career, Ahomadégbé-Tomêtin decided to pursue dentistry, opening an office in Porto-Novo.

Originally a member of the Dahomeyan Progressive Union (UPD), in 1946 he established the African People's Bloc (BPA), and was elected to the General Council shortly afterwards. He was re-elected in 1952. In 1955 the BPA merged with the UPD to established the Dahomeyan Democratic Union (UDD). He was a vocal critic of the French rule, and gained influence upon allying himself with trade unions. Using this, Ahomadégbé-Tomêtin was elected Mayor of Abomey in November 1956 elections.

The results of the territorial elections of 1959 were as such: the Republican Party of Dahomey (PRD), led by Sourou-Migan Apithy received 37 seats with 144,038 votes; the Dahomeyan Democratic Rally (RDD), led by Hubert Maga received 22 seats with 62,132 votes; and Ahomadégbé-Tomêtin's UDD receiving just 11 deputies for its 162,179 votes. What followed was described by journalist Robert Matthews as "an immediate explosion". Supporters of Ahomadégbé-Tomêtin started riots that were so severe that French soldiers were called in to quell them. Apithy and Ahomadégbé-Tomêtin agreed to split the contested 18 seats in a southwest constituency among themselves as a result of a mediation performed by Félix Houphouët-Boigny. However, Ahomadégbé-Tomêtin made it clear that he would not allow Apithy to remain the prime minister of Dahomey, but Apithy was not going to listen to his demands. Maga was chosen as a compromise for the premiership and was voted into this post on May 22, 1959.

== Independence and dissent ==
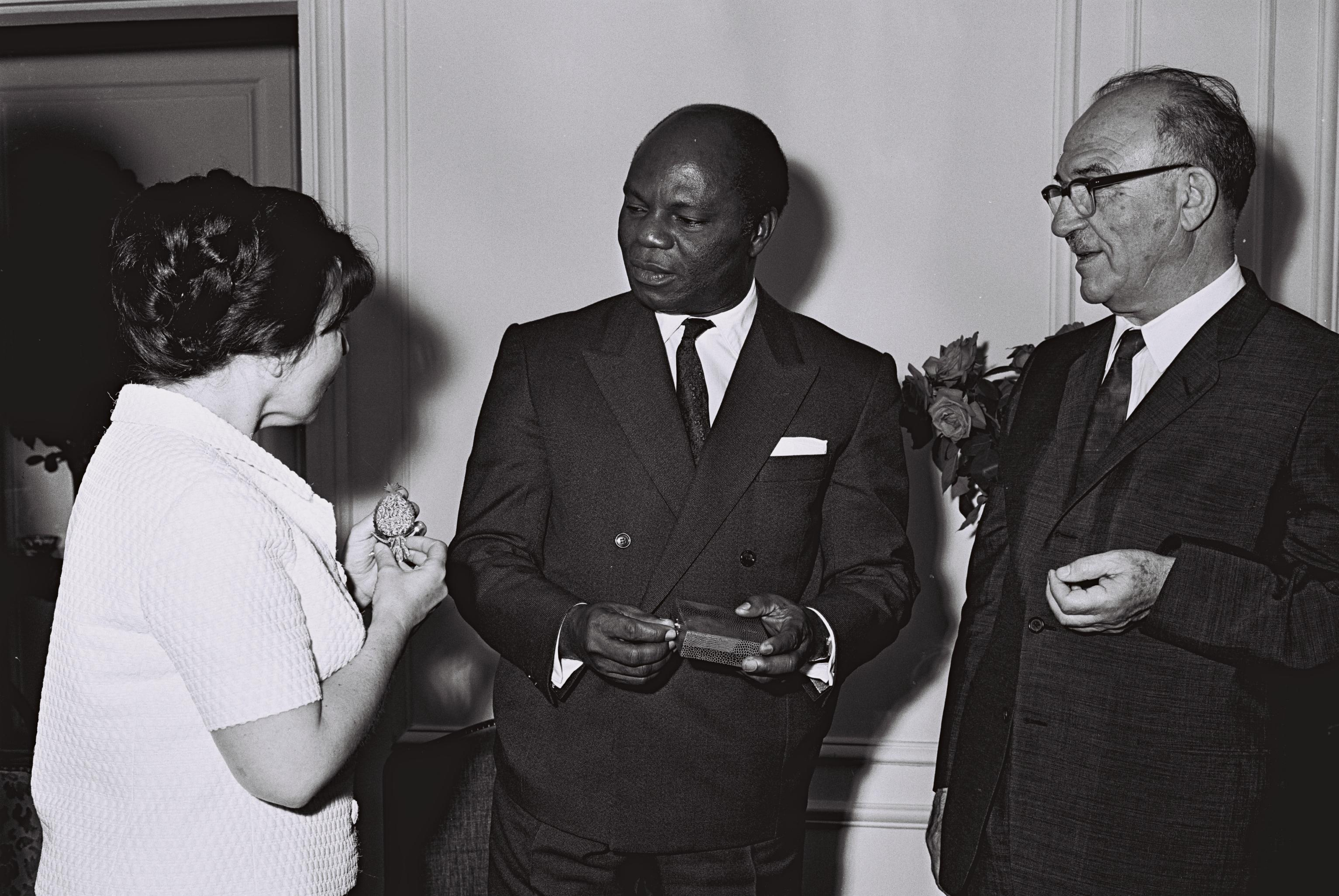
Ahomadegbe-Tometin with Israeli prime minister Levi Eshkol, 1964

On August 1, 1960, Dahomey gained its independence and Maga became its first president. Shortly after independence, the three parties united into the "Patriotic Action Front" and redistricted Dahomey into one electoral constituency. Under this system, they would provide a list of candidates of whom whoever received a majority would win all legislative seats. It did not last long; soon, Ahomadégbé-Tomêtin broke from the union and, using the discontent among people over the increasing rarity of jobs in the country, incited demonstrations. In September 1960 he claimed that a single-party state was the only solution to the stagnation of the economy; since he had just broken from one, he was looking for another party to be led by him.

Meanwhile, Maga made Houphouët-Boigny recognise the RDD as the Dahomeyan wing of his African Democratic Rally. Ahomadégbé-Tomêtin had always believed that the UDD was the sole representative of the Rally.

At the end of September Ahomadégbé-Tomêtin convinced the trade unions that he owned to begin another strike for Maga's inability to promote national development and ensure the welfare of the working class. The strike, which existed in Dahomey's capital of Porto-Novo and its largest city of Cotonou, became so serious that police forces used tear gas and ended when Maga sent down some faithful Northerners, carrying around bows and arrows and patrolling the streets at night. At the same time members of the UDD organised a motion of censure in the National Assembly. Maga relied on Apithy for help in opposing the motion, and it was ultimately rejected.

Right after the motion was rejected, UDD deputies began quitting their jobs. They were in turn replaced by deputies of the PRD Shortly after this the PRD and RDD merged to form the Dahomeyan Unity Party (PDU) and Maga was naturally elected its leader. On December 11, Maga was formally elected president and Apithy vice president. In the parliamentary elections the PDU received 69% of the vote and UDD 31%, although it was not represented in the National Assembly.

== Maga assassination plot ==
On May 26 Information Minister Albert Tévoédjrè notified Maga that Ahomadégbé-Tomêtin had plotted to assassinate the president but he and 11 other dissidents had been arrested. The trial date was set for December. It differed from many political trials in Africa being that it was held in public and the defence was allowed a lawyer from Paris. In any event, Ahomadégbé-Tomêtin received five years for his role in the conspiracy, and the others were dealt from one- to ten-year sentences. The UDD was also banned. Maga ultimately released them in November 1962, saying in a broadcast (Note: It is unclear what type of broadcast this was.) that it was not only due to their good behavior in jail but also to reconcile with his former enemies.

== Presidential council ==
=== Background and 1970 election ===
On December 10, 1969, Émile Derlin Zinsou was overthrown by Maurice Kouandété, who had installed him as president in the first place. The military, however, refused to recognize Kouandété, and as the two men could not reach agreement, a Military Directorate was established with Paul-Émile de Souza as its chairman. An election was held on March 28, 1970, to determine the true president. On this occasion, the triumvirate was allowed to campaign, and they did not miss the chance. Intimidation and bribery were commonplace, and the electoral campaign saw the comeback of regional loyalties. It was also marked by a series of violent outbursts; invalidated reports state that six people were killed or wounded at incidents in Parakou on the eve of the elections. Fellow candidate Zinsou asserted that Maga supporters had killed one of his supporters during said incidents.

These charges did not affect Maga's standing in the polls; he received a majority of the vote in the north, and Apithy and Ahomadégbé-Tomêtin received a majority in the southeast and southwest/central, respectively. The election results were as follows: 252,551 citizens voted for Maga; 200,091 for Ahomadégbé-Tomêtin, and 186,332 for Apithy. In the entire south, Maga received 24,000 votes compared to the 180,000 who voted for him in the Borgou Department, obtaining 97.3 percent of the 78 percent turnout. Zinsou, running to counter the constant tribal clashes, received 3 percent, with 17,551 votes.

Nonetheless, de Souza decided to nullify the results from Atakora, the region where Maga received the most votes, on April 3. Outraged, Maga formed the Assembly of the Peoples of the North, which threatened to secede unless he was declared president. He refused to leave his campaign headquarters at Parakou even to attend political meetings. Maga's reaction to the nullification prompted many southern workers to flee the north. Apithy stated that he would convince his region to join Nigeria if Maga took the presidency and took steps to bribe his way into that office. Ahomadégbé-Tomêtin claimed Maga had defrauded the electoral system to his advantage. In contrast with the other three former presidents, Zinsou admitted that he had been defeated and decided participate in bargaining, explaining that he rejected the idea of a coalition "for personal reasons". The other former presidents, on the other hand, agreed to a hasty compromise on April 13 to prevent a civil war.

=== Under Maga ===
A presidential council, consisting of Maga, Ahomadégbé-Tomêtin, and Apithy, was set up on May 7 with a presidency that changed every two years. Maga inaugurated this system for the first two years. Each man agreed to not use the military to extend their term or use any other means toward that consequence. If decisions were not unanimous during the first round of voting, a two councilman majority would suffice on the second round. The council served as the executive and legislative branch of Dahomey.

The cabinet was composed of four Ahomadégbé-Tomêtin allies, three Maga allies, and three allies of Apithy. Gabriel Lozès, appointed minister of finance; Theophile Paoletti, new minister of information and tourism; Edmond Doussou-Yovo, minister of education; and Karl Ahouansou, minister of communication, were all friends of Ahomadégbé-Tomêtin. Maga's colleagues in the cabinet were Pascal Chabi Kao, minister of finance; Albert Ouassa, minister of health; and Chabi Mama, minister of rural development; while Apithy friends were Ambroise Agboton, minister of labor; Joseph Keke, minister of economy and planning; and Michel Toko, minister of justice and guardian of the seals. Daouda Badarou, who had served as foreign minister under Zinsou, was allowed to keep his job.

Maga's economic policies during his chairmanship helped quiet union leaders whose protests during his presidency had been intense. He helped create a tax plan that would finance their salaries by cutting expenditures and cracking down on tax evasion. In 1970 Dahomey witnessed a surplus of 429 million CFA francs, rising to a 570 million CFA franc surplus the following year. With the national economy in a favorable position, Ahomadégbé-Tomêtin and the rest of the council could afford a number of luxuries, including three houses and three Mercedes-Benz 300 automobiles to be shared amongst themselves, and festivals for the anniversary of the founding of the triumvirate.

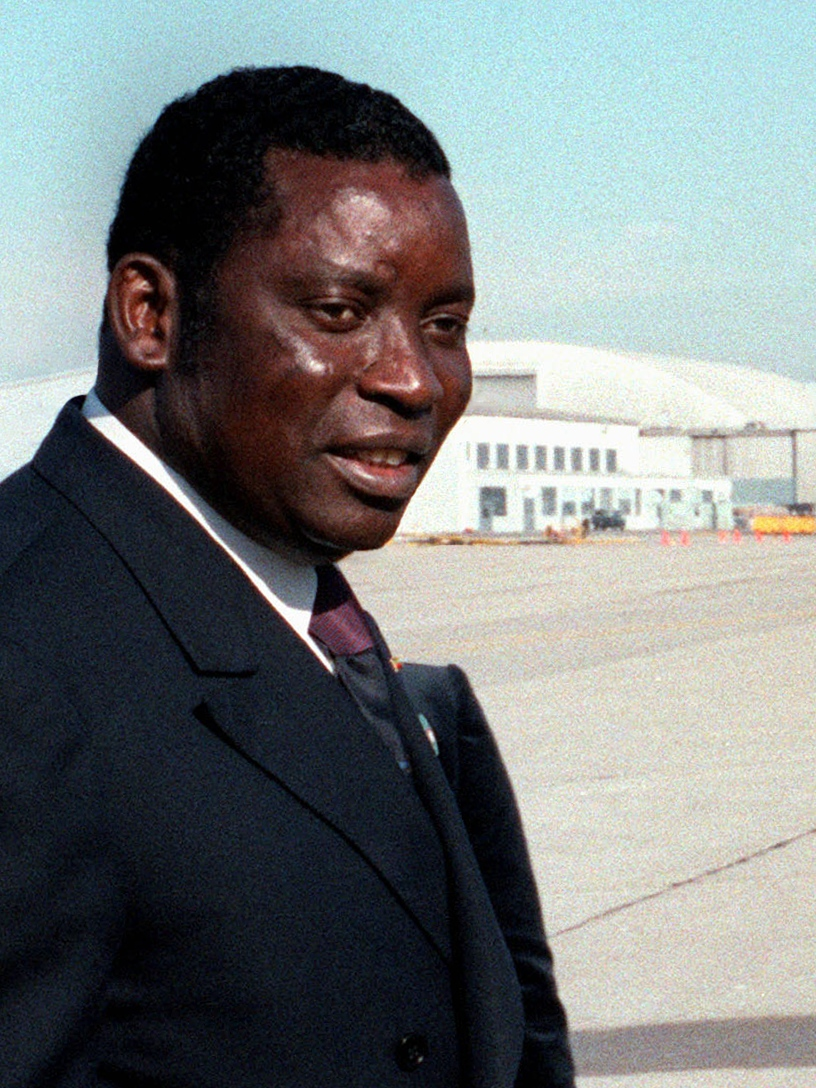
Togolese president Etienne Eyadema, who would later change his name to Gnassingbé Eyadéma. His decision to extradite opposition leader Noe Kutuklui, and the Presidential Council's agreement, helped to undermine its popularity.

The Council lost popularity with the Kutuklui Affair. By decree of Ahomadégbé-Tomêtin and the rest of the council, Togolese opposition leader Noe Kutuklui was officially expelled from Dahomey on October 27, 1971, where he had been practicing law since the late 1960s. It was at the request of General Étienne Eyadéma, president of Togo, as Kutuklui had been involved in several plots against Eyadema's military government. The council's decision to extradite him spurred demonstrations in Cotonou. Maga was unable to carry out his decision; Alphonse Alley protected Kutuklui and took him to an unknown place outside of Dahomey. Col. Alley received no punishment whatsoever for his role in the Affair.

Students were some of those involved in the protests, and they soon had another reason to conflict with their government. On November 5, 1971, Ahomadégbé-Tomêtin and his administration shut down the Union Général des Etudiants et Eleves de Dahomey (UGEED), a radical youth group which sought to "transform Dahomey into a battlefield" using "workers, soldiers, and policemen". This stemmed from UGEED-sponsored demonstrations against the minister of education when he failed to attend an educational meeting. Students whose schools followed the strike were allowed back to school on November 19, and only if their parents signed documents that said they would not participate in more demonstrations. If they failed to comply, they would be expelled from the educational system of Dahomey. Government-instituted rallies were arranged to support the ban.

The military was also aroused. The formation of a presidential council only further enraged the army. Ahomadégbé-Tomêtin was ambushed while traveling to a rally in Abomey on May 7, 1971. Maga initially denied its existence, and to this day details are unclear. An artillery camp at Ouidah was the location of another military uprising on January 28, 1972. The president sent two officers to overpower the rebels although no punishment was undertaken. Both Ahomadégbé-Tomêtin and Maga believed that the latter incident was an attempted coup.

Kouandété attempted to usurp power again at dawn on February 23. When he first heard of the mutiny, Ahomadégbé-Tomêtin believed that it was an attempt by Maga to remain in power. Leading the Ouidah garrison, Kouandété also attempted to take over government buildings and murder de Souza. Over the course of the operation, assailant Major Moumouni was mortally wounded by de Souza's bullets. The plot was foiled, although Maga canceled a visit to France to attend to the matter at hand. A 12-member military commission would soon discover another plot, that would have been undertaken simultaneous to Kouandété's. According to its findings, Captains Glele and Pierre Boni were going to follow Kouandété until de Souza was assassinated, when they would eradicate their leader and insert Zinsou back into power. The recent events epitomised the council's "fear and contempt" for the military.

=== Under Ahomadégbé-Tomêtin ===
Maga transferred power to Ahomadégbé-Tomêtin on May 7, 1972. This was the first time in 12 years that the head of Dahomey was succeeded in a nonmilitary fashion. The new chairman congratulated Maga and praised the triumvirate as "one of Dahomey's most beneficial institutions." It was believed that the triumvirate would continually undermine each other, and the simple transition of power was viewed as a positive step toward Dahomeyan unity.

The Presidential Council was slow in organizing a military trial for the 1972 coup plotters, and it did not begin until May 12. The court tried 21 men besides Kouandété, (Note: The true number of accused men was not known until the trial was convened.) mostly military officers but also including several commoners and even Maga bodyguards. The punishments were announced on May 16. Kouandété received the death penalty, as did Captains Josué and Glélé, Quartermaster Sergeant Agboton, and a corporal and a sergeant in absentia. Lesser sentences were handed to five men who were given life imprisonment, two who would serve 20 years in prison, another with 15 years, two with ten, and two with five. An additional four were acquitted. The sentences were never carried out; the jurors believed that Kouandété would seize power in another coup.

Another delayed function of the council was the formation of the Assemblée Consultative Nationale, an advisory assembly required by the 1970 constitution. As per the constitution, such an assembly would contain 30 members advising councilmen on economic, social, and other issues, with Paul Darboux presiding. It was not established until July 1972, due to, in the words of academic Samuel Decalo, "intensive horse-trading between the partners in the Presidential Council ... and pressures from their political lieutenants for a position in the Assembly."

One of the most notable aspects of Ahomadégbé-Tomêtin's time in power was the Kovacs Affair. It began with Pascal Chabi Kao being given a monopoly over selling official stationery to the Presidential Council and spread to claims of bribery and embezzlement. Ahomadégbé-Tomêtin tried to fire Chabi Kao, but Maga, who was Chabi Kao's mentor, refused. Maga convinced Apithy to help and the bill was vetoed.

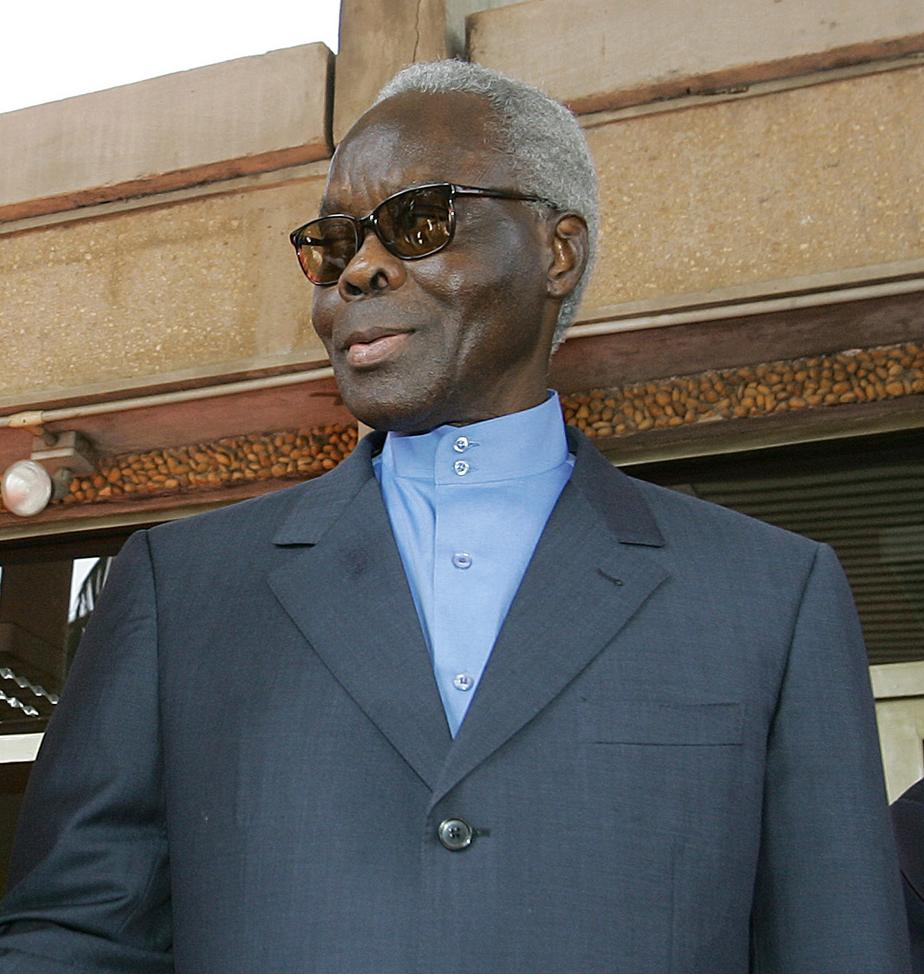
Mathieu Kérékou, who overthrew the Presidential Council in 1972, in a 2006 photograph

Another coup was launched by soldiers of the Ouidah garrison on October 26. This one, however, was successful, and Major Mathieu Kérékou was installed as president. It occurred during a cabinet meeting between Maga and Ahomadégbé-Tomêtin. (Note: Apithy was in Paris on a political trip.) Kérékou had served as Maga's aide-de-camp in 1961. According to reports at the scene, soldiers abruptly arrived in the Cabinet room of the presidential palace and started firing bullets, but no one was injured. Kérékou called the triumvirate "truly a monster" as it showed "unpardonable incompetence", amongst other charges which were used to justify the coup. Kouandété was pardoned, although the former council was not. Maga, Ahomadégbé-Tomêtin, and Apithy spent more than nine years in prison before being freed by Kérékou in 1981.

== Later life and death ==
After being released from incarceration, Ahomadégbé-Tomêtin was elected a member of parliament in 1991 under the National Rally for Democracy ticket and served at until 1995. He continued to lead the U.D.D. until his death on March 8, 2002, at the Hubert Maga National University and Hospital Center in Cotonou. No cause of death was given, although he was said to have suffered for a long time. The last of the triumvirate to die, he was awarded a state funeral and seven days of mourning, beginning on March 11. Flags were ordered to be flown at half-staff throughout the country during that period. President Kerekou visited Ahomadégbé-Tomêtin's house shortly after his death, praising him as "a man of character, conviction, a fighter and a wise man".

The death of Ahomadégbé-Tomêtin, which dominated newspapers in Dahomey, was received with more ambivalence than Kerekou's positive sentiments. Le Progres went so far as to say that Ahomadégbé-Tomêtin was "the monster of Abomey", and that he was "envied by his brothers due to his frankness and integrity ... Many of those now commending his patriotism, high morals and political exploits somehow killed him at one time or other." Le Matinal wrote an article on the man, entitled "Message from beyond: Ahomadegbe challenges Kerekou", questioning why "the perpetrators of crimes [are] so indecent as to shed crocodile tears". More neutral was Fraternite, noting that "Ahomadegbe, whose political might was extraordinary, was among the most feared politicians in Benin's contemporary history. He was dangerous to have either as friend or foe. To him, politics was a winding sentence with several commas but no full stop."

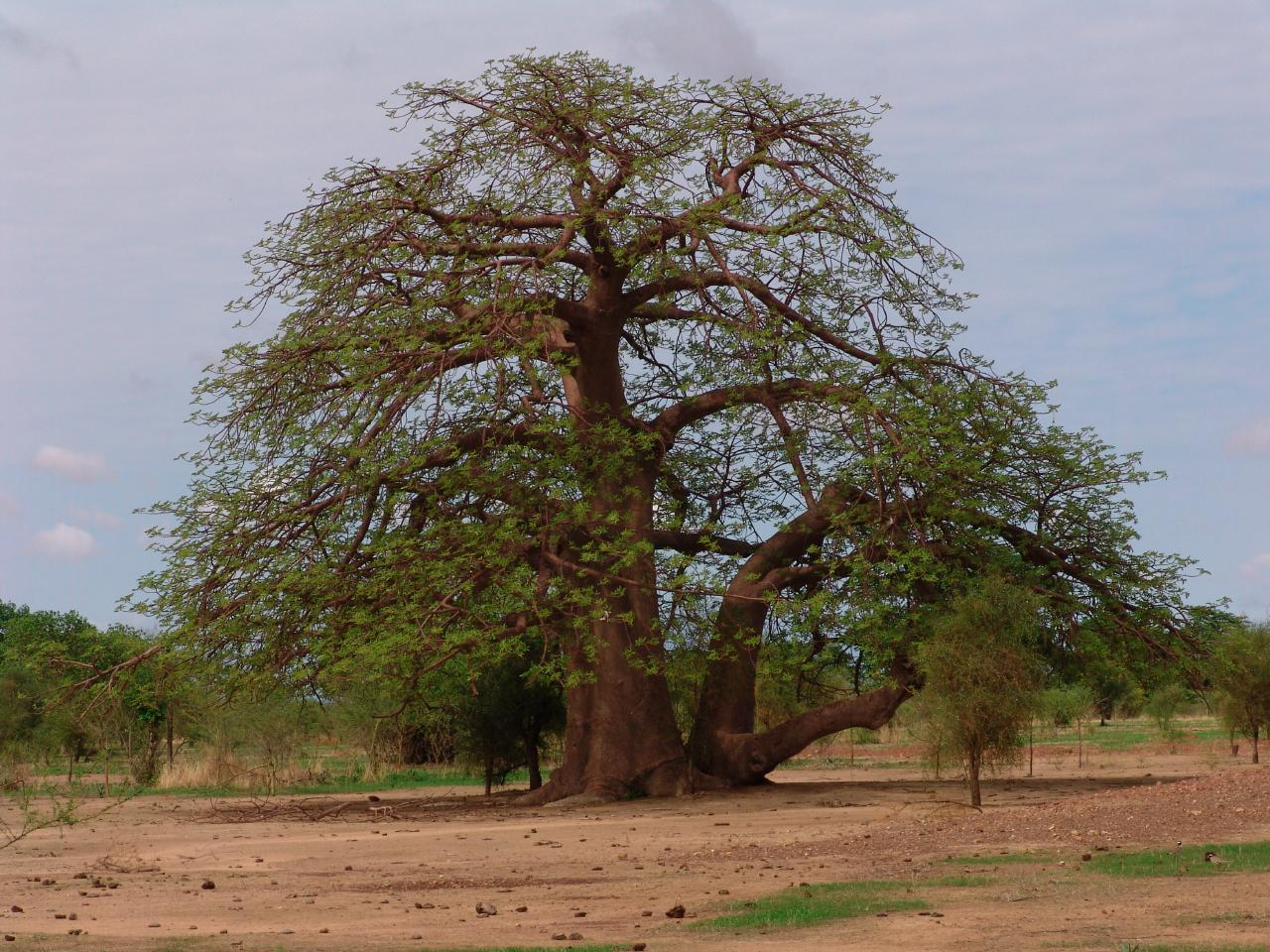
The Beninese newspaper Le Republicain compared Ahomadégbé-Tomêtin's fall to that of a baobab tree.

Le Republicain compared his fall to that of a baobab tree, reflecting the mostly sad emotions that followed his departing. According to them, Ahomadégbé-Tomêtin "was among the three great thinkers who took turns to lead Dahomey (now Benin) from May 1970 to October 1972". A long prison sentence did not affect his inspiratory qualities. Les Echos du Jour stated that "the dental surgeon who became president fought to the end against life and its mishaps, then against death ... He resisted with all his might not to escape death, but merely to show that nothing was over until it was over." In an obituary, Jeune Afrique described the man as "humor[ous], loved good cheer, knew how to enjoy the good side of life, but his blows of anger were Homeric".

== Bibliography ==
- Carter, Gwendolen Margaret, ed. (1963), "Dahomey", Five African States; Responses to Diversity: the Congo, Dahomey, the Cameroun Federal Republic, the Rhodesias and Nyasaland, South Africa, Ithaca, New York: Cornell University Press, OCLC 413212.
- Danopoulos, Constantine Panos (1988), The Decline of Military Regimes: The Civilian Influence, Boulder, Colorado: Westview Press, ISBN 0-8133-7304-2, OCLC 15162972.
- Decalo, Samuel (December 1970), "Full Circle in Dahomey", African Studies Review, 13 (3), African Studies Association: 445–457, doi:10.2307/523497, JSTOR 523497, S2CID 143176760.
- Decalo, Samuel (April 1973), "Regionalism, Politics, and the Military in Dahomey", The Journal of Developing Areas, 7 (3), College of Business, Tennessee State University: 449–478, JSTOR 4190033.
- Decalo, Samuel (1976), Historical Dictionary of Dahomey (People's Republic of Benin), Metuchen, New Jersey: Scarecrow Press, ISBN 0-8108-0833-1, OCLC 1959674.
- Dossou-Yovo, Noel (September 1999), "The Experience of Benin", International Journal on World Peace, 16 (3), ISSN 0742-3640, OCLC 211426384 – via Questia.
- Hudgens, Jim; Trillo, Richard; Calonnec, Nathalie (2003), The Rough Guide to West Africa, London: Rough Guides, ISBN 1-84353-118-6, OCLC 176832097.
- Ihonvbere, Julius Omozuanvbo; Mbaku, John Mukum (2003), Political Liberalization and Democratization in Africa: Lessons from Country Experiences, Westport, Connecticut: Praeger, ISBN 0-313-05151-8, OCLC 60127996.
- Kneib, Martha (2007), Benin, Cultures of the World, Tarrytown, New York: Marshall Cavendish, ISBN 978-0-7614-2328-7, OCLC 62109915.
- Matthews, Ronald (1966), African Powder Keg: Revolt and Dissent in Six Emergent Nations, London: The Bodley Head, OCLC 246401461.
- Ronen, Dov (1975), Dahomey: Between Tradition and Modernity, Ithaca, New York: Cornell University Press, ISBN 0-8014-0927-6, OCLC 1527290.
- West Africa Publishing Company (1971), West Africa.
