= 1957 Dahomeyan Territorial Assembly election =

- 31 March 1957
- All 60 seats in the Territorial Assembly; 31 seats needed for a majority
Party	Leader	Vote %	Seats	+/–
PRD	Sourou-Migan Apithy	38.57	35	+16
UDD	Justin Ahomadégbé-Tomêtin	25.29	7	+3
MDD	Hubert Maga	21.47	6	−3
Independents	–	12.14	12	
This lists parties that won seats. See the complete results below.

Elections to the Territorial Assembly were held in French Dahomey on 31 March 1957. The result was a victory for the Republican Party of Dahomey, which won 35 of the 60 seats.

== Results ==
Party	Votes	%	Seats	+/–
Republican Party of Dahomey	109,927	38.57	35	+16
Dahomeyan Democratic Union	72,097	25.29	7	+3
Dahomeyan Democratic Movement	61,192	21.47	6	–3
Other parties	7,207	2.53	0	–
Independents	34,606	12.14	12	–
Total	285,029	100.00	60	+10
Valid votes	285,029	97.63		
Invalid/blank votes	6,909	2.37		
Total votes	291,938	100.00		
Registered voters/turnout	673,056	43.37		
Source: Sternberger et al.

Figures for independent candidates include the Independents of the North.

== Composition of the Territorial Assembly office ==
The Territorial Assembly office was composed as follows:

President	Sourou-Migan Apithy
Vice-presidents	Hubert Maga, Francis Covi, Jean Agier and Michel Noudehou
Secretaries	Nicolas Amoussou Eouagnignon, Antoine Mensah, Chabi Mama and Jean-Baptiste Kayossi
Questeurs	Amzat Sani Agata and Atégui Batcho
Source: Oudard.
