= Édouard Dunglas =

Édouard Dunglas (1891–1952) was a French colonial civil servant, historian, geographer and politician who spent a majority of his life in Dahomey (now Benin).

== Early life ==
Born in Paris in 1891, Dunglas was educated as a medical doctor. He found a passion in politics, and quit medicine when he was appointed to administrate Togo. Later, he worked in Ketou, Dahomey, and wrote a celebrated history of the town. He also found praise with his geographical studies and documents on traditions of the Fon people. After World War II, Dunglas was named head of the multi-national research institution Institut français d'Afrique noire (IFAN) in Dahomey.

== 1951 French National Assembly election ==
In the legislative elections of June 17, 1951, Dahomey was allowed an additional representative in the French National Assembly. Veteran politician Sourou-Migan Apithy faced a new opponent: northern teacher Hubert Maga. The fact that two seats were allotted to Dahomey was only known in the last week of April. As per a May 1951 electoral law, each candidate had to give the names of another who would occupy the second seat in the event that the other party's first candidate came in third or below. Apithy chose Émile Derlin Zinsou as his running mate, with Apithy leading on the electoral list as of a meeting on April 29. However, Zinsou argued that he would be forced to vacate seat on the Assembly of the French Union and that someone from the north of Dahomey would be able to fill it. Therefore, on May 23 it was decided that Zinsou and Apithy would be listed in that order. Maga, meanwhile, chose northern merchant Paul Darboux and the latter was content as second on the list.

Zinsou and Apithy, in stark contrast to their northern rivals, could not agree on who would headline the list. It reached a point, on May 27, that the two southern candidates decided to run individually: Zinsou campaigned with school teacher Gilbert Kpakpo, while Apithy partnered with Dunglas under the newly formed Union française. Maga and Darboux capitalised on growing cynicism regarding southern Dahomey dominating the French colony's politics, allying themselves with the northern tribes.

The May 1951 law also enlarged the electorate from 61,958 to 333,693. Some dead people were even counted as electors due to the mishandling of election cards. The Cotonou newspaper L'Étoile du Dahomey noted the presence of a man who would give an unlimited number of cards as long as they promised to vote for Apithy. Altogether, however, only 44% of the population voted on election day. Apithy was reelected a deputy with 53,463 votes out of 147,350 cast. Maga captured the second seat with 49,329, with Zinsou/Kpakpo receiving a mere 18,410 ballots. Several smaller parties hosted several other candidates, which received the rest of the votes. Only 2.2 percent of Apithy and Dunglas's votes came from the northern region, while 64 percent came from the Porto-Novo metropolitan area.

== Later life and death ==
After the election Dunglas won a seat in Dahomey's territorial assembly. He died in 1952 in Porto-Novo. His grave is located in a Porto-Novian cemetery.

== Bibliography ==
- Carter, Gwendolen Margaret, ed. (1963), "Dahomey", Five African States; Responses to Diversity: the Congo, Dahomey, the Cameroun Federal Republic, the Rhodesias and Nyasaland, South Africa, Ithaca, New York: Cornell University Press, OCLC 413212.
- Decalo, Samuel (April 1973), "Regionalism, Politics, and the Military in Dahomey", The Journal of Developing Areas, 7 (3), College of Business, Tennessee State University: 449–478, JSTOR 4190033.
- Decalo, Samuel (1976), Historical Dictionary of Dahomey (People's Republic of Benin), Metuchen, New Jersey: Scarecrow Press, ISBN 0-8108-0833-1, OCLC 1959674.
- Ronen, Dov (1975), Dahomey: Between Tradition and Modernity, Ithaca, New York: Cornell University Press, ISBN 0-8014-0927-6, OCLC 1527290.
- Staniland, Martin (1973a), "The Three-Party System in Dahomey: I, 1946-1956", The Journal of African History, 14 (2), Cambridge University Press: 491–504, doi:10.1017/S0021853700012846, JSTOR 180543.
