= 1952 Dahomeyan Territorial Assembly election =

- 30 March 1952
- All 50 seats in the Territorial Assembly; 26 seats needed for a majority
Party	Leader	Seats
Republican Party	Sourou-Migan Apithy	19
UDIGD	Paul Hazoumé	12
Ethnic Group of the North	Hubert Maga	9
African People's Bloc	Justin Ahomadégbé-Tomêtin; Émile Poisson	4
Centre Union	Raphaël Moretti	3
UDIES	Moïse Durand	2
Independents	Jean-Jacques Bonneveau	1
This lists parties that won seats. See the complete results below.

Elections for the Territorial Assembly were held in French Dahomey on 30 March 1952. Sourou-Migan Apithy's Republican Party of Dahomey won 19 of the 32 second college seats. Only ten members of the Legislative Council elected in 1947 were re-elected.

== Background ==
The Legislative Council had been created as part of the constitutional reforms that created French Fourth Republic. In 1952 it was converted into the Territorial Assembly, and was enlarged from 30 to 50 seats. The Assembly was elected by two electoral colleges; 18 by the first electoral college and 32 by the second.

== Results ==
Party	Votes	%	Seats
First College
Union for the Defence of the General Interests of Dahomey	484		12
Centre Union	79		3
Union for the Defence of Economic and Social Interests	61		2
Defence of Economic Interests			0
Defence of the Interests of North Dahomey			0
For the French Union			0
Independent List for the Defence of General Interests			0
Independent List of the Interests of the North			0
Republican Party of Dahomey			0
Social and Economic Action			0
Social and Economic Union			0
Independents	326		1
Total			18
Total votes	1,338	–	
Registered voters/turnout	2,130	62.82	
Second College
Republican Party of Dahomey	52,200		19
Ethnic Group of the North	42,427		9
African People's Bloc	5,797		4
Dahomeyan Progressive Union			0
Other parties			0
Independents			0
Total			32
Total votes	127,166	–	
Registered voters/turnout	316,547	40.17	
Source: De Benoist, France-Dahomey
