= Union of Independents of Dahomey =

Political party in French Dahomey

The Union of Independents of Dahomey (French: Union des Indépendants du Dahomey, UNIDAHO) was a political party in French Dahomey led by Paul Darboux.

== History ==
The party was established by Darboux in 1956 in the Djougou region to compete against Hubert Maga and the Dahomeyan Democratic Movement (MDD). It was originally known as Defense of Economic Interests (Défense des Intérêts Économiques, DIE). It contested the 1956 elections to the French National Assembly, but received only 1.7% of the vote.

Darboux won the Djougou seat in the March 1957 Territorial Assembly elections. By this time the party had been renamed the Independents of the North (Indépendants du Nord). In August 1957 the party merged with the MDD to form the Dahomeyan Democratic Rally (RDD). However, Darboux left the RDD in April 1958 to re-establish his own party, now under the UNIDAHO name.
