= 1956 French legislative election in Dahomey =

Elections to the French National Assembly were held in French Dahomey on 2 January 1956. The territory elected two seats to the Assembly, which were won by Sourou-Migan Apithy of the Republican Party of Dahomey and Hubert Maga of the Ethnic Group of the North. Voter turnout was 47%.

== Results ==
Party	Votes	%	Seats	+/–
Republican Party of Dahomey	64,344	35.92	1	New
Dahomeyan Democratic Movement	60,601	33.83	1	0
Dahomeyan Democratic Union	40,624	22.68	0	New
Independent of Political Parties	10,580	5.91	0	0
Defence of Economic Interests	2,970	1.66	0	0
Total	179,119	100.00	2	0
Valid votes	179,119	98.30		
Invalid/blank votes	3,099	1.70		
Total votes	182,218	100.00		
Registered voters/turnout	384,643	47.37		
Source: Sternberger et al.
