= 1959 Dahomeyan parliamentary election =

- 2 April 1959
- All 70 seats in the Legislative Assembly; 36 seats needed for a majority
Party	Leader	Vote %	Seats	+/–
UDD	Justin Ahomadégbé-Tomêtin	43.94	22	+15
PRD	Sourou-Migan Apithy	38.93	28	−7
RDD	Hubert Maga	17.13	20	+6
This lists parties that won seats. See the complete results below.

Parliamentary elections were held in the Republic of Dahomey on 2 April 1959. Although the Dahomeyan Democratic Union (UDD) received the most votes, they won the fewest seats. The Republican Party of Dahomey (PRD), which came second in terms of votes, won 37 of the 70 seats in the Legislative Assembly. Following the election the PRD and UDD agreed to split the seats in one constituency, with the PRD losing nine seats and the UDD gaining nine seats.

== Results ==
Party	Votes	%	Seats			
Party	Votes	%	Initial results	+/–	Final results	+/–
Dahomeyan Democratic Union	162,574	43.94	11	+4	20	+13
Republican Party of Dahomey	144,038	38.93	37	+2	28	–7
Dahomeyan Democratic Rally	63,383	17.13	22	+16	22	+16
Total	369,995	100.00	70	+10	70	+10
Source: Nohlen et al.

Elected members included:

- Dominique Aplogan
