= Dahomeyan Democratic Union =

Political party in French Dahomey

Dahomeyan Democratic Union Union Démocratique Dahoméenne
- Leader: Justin Ahomadegbé
- Founded: 1955
- Banned: 11 April 1961
- Merger of: Dahomeyean Progressive Union; African People's Bloc

The Dahomeyan Democratic Union (French: Union Démocratique Dahoméenne, UDD) was a political party in French Dahomey.

== History ==
The UDD was established in 1955 by a merger of the Dahomeyan Progressive Union (UPD) and the African People's Bloc (BPA). It aimed to be a nationwide party, but despite initially gaining support from across the country, it quickly became identified as the party of the Fon of Abomey and Cotonou.

The party failed to win a seat in the French National Assembly in the 1956 elections, and split into two factions later in the year over the issue of affiliation with the African Democratic Rally (RDA); former BPA leader Justin Ahomadégbé-Tomêtin became head of the dominant RDA faction, whilst Alexandre Adandé and former UPD leader Émile Derlin Zinsou headed the smaller UDD-Convention.

Despite its internal problems and regionalised support base, the UDD emerged as the second-largest party in the 1957 Territorial Assembly elections, winning seven seats. However, the 1959 elections produced an unbalanced result; although the UDD received 44% of the vote, more than any other party, it won just 11 of the 70 seats in the Territorial Assembly, whilst the Dahomeyan Democratic Rally (RDD) won 22 seats with 17% of the vote and the Republican Party of Dahomey (PRD) took 37 seats, more than three times the number of the UDD. Following the elections, accusations of fraud led to an agreement being reached with the PRD to redistribute nine seats. Although this increased the UDD's seat tally to 20, it was still the smallest party in the Assembly.

In elections held the following year, the Dahomeyan Unity Party, a merger of the PRD and the RDD, won every seat after President Hubert Maga changed the electoral system, leaving the UDD without parliamentary representation. Following the elections, the UDD was banned on 11 April 1961 and Ahomadégbé-Tomêtin was imprisoned.
