= 1951 French legislative election in Dahomey =

Elections to the French National Assembly were held in French Dahomey on 17 June 1951. The territory elected two seats to the Assembly, which were won by Sourou-Migan Apithy of the List of the French Union and Hubert Maga of the Ethnic Group of the North. Voter turnout was 44%.

== Results ==
Party	Votes	%	Seats
List of the French Union	53,463	36.79	1
Ethnic Group of the North	49,329	33.94	1
Dahomeyan Progressive Union	18,410	12.67	0
Independent of Political Parties	10,161	6.99	0
African People's Bloc	8,686	5.98	0
Rally of the French People	5,284	3.64	0
Total	145,333	100.00	2
Valid votes	145,333	98.63	
Invalid/blank votes	2,017	1.37	
Total votes	147,350	100.00	
Registered voters/turnout	332,867	44.27	
Source: Sternberger et al.
