= Arouna Mama =

Beninese politician

Arouna Mama (1925–1974) was a Beninese politician, most active when his country was known as Dahomey.

== Biography ==
Mama was born in 1925 in Parakou to an influential family. He was elected to the Assemblee Territoriale in 1957 and became its president two years later. In 1959, he was elected a senator in the Communaute Francais. In May 1969, Mama was appointed minister of the interior by president Hubert Maga, who he supported as member of the Dahomey Democratic Rally. He was part of a conservative group during Maga's initial term as president that included his political rival, Chabi Mama.

In 1962, Maga named Arouna Mama as the minister of the interior and defense. Mama held this position until a coup toppled Maga in 1963. The following year, Mama started riots in support of returning Maga to the presidency in Parakou, where his support was strongest. This led to him being imprisoned by Christophe Soglo, the acting president at the time. Mama was also accused of embezzlement. He was an educational inspector until a presidential council was established in 1970 under Maga's leadership, in which he was again named minister of the interior and defense. With another coup in 1972, he lost his position as minister and was found guilty of embezzlement. On 31 December 1973, Mama returned 6.6 million CFA francs and was released from prison. He died in 1974.

In 1931, he entered primary school and passed his CEP in 1940. Admitted in 1941 to the School of Agriculture of Porto-Novo, he gave it up to prepare for the entrance examination to the College Victor-Ballot where he was admitted the same year. He spent three years at EPS and then entered the Normal School of Teachers in Dabou (Ivory Coast) in 1945. In 1948, Mama Arouna was a teacher and served successively in Porto-Novo, Pèrèrè, Bembéréké and Parakou. In 1955, he was admitted to the CAP.

Mama Arouna's political career was rapid and brilliant. In 1956, he was thirty years old, he was elected to the municipal council of Parakou and became mayor of this municipality. In 1957, he again took on the responsibilities of General Councilor. That same year he represented Dahomey on the AOF Grand Council.

He pursues political activity in Dakar as a member of the intergroup between the Rassemblement Démocratique Dahoméen (RDD) and the African Convention, as a member of the social affairs commission and as an administrator of the Central PTT Office.

Elected deputy in the legislative elections of April 2, 1959, he was part of the First Government chaired by Hubert Maga (May 1959) as Minister of the Interior. Reelected as a deputy in the elections of December 11, 1960, he was once again entrusted with the Ministry of Internal Affairs and Defense.
