= 1946–47 Dahomeyan General Council election =

- 15 December 1946; 5 January 1947
- All 30 seats in the General Council; 16 seats needed for a majority
Party	Leader	Seats
Dahomeyan Progressive Union	Sourou-Migan Apithy	20
African People's Bloc	Justin Ahomadégbé-Tomêtin; Émile Poisson	6
Independents	–	4
This lists parties that won seats. See the complete results below.

Elections to the General Council were held in French Dahomey on 15 December 1946 and 5 January 1947. The result was a victory for the Dahomeyan Progressive Union, which won 20 of the 30 seats.

== Electoral system ==
The General Council (Conseil Général) was established as part of the constitutional reforms that created the French Fourth Republic. It had 30 seats, with 12 members elected by the first electoral college and 18 by the second electoral college.

== Results ==
Party	First round			Second round			Total seats
Party	Votes	%	Seats	Votes	%	Seats	Total seats
First College
Dahomeyan Progressive Union			1			4	5
African People's Bloc			0			5	5
Independents			0			2	2
Total			1			11	12
Total votes	613	–					
Registered voters/turnout	1,533	39.99					
Second College
Dahomeyan Progressive Union			10			5	15
African People's Bloc			0			1	1
Independents			2			0	2
Total			12			6	18
Total votes	76,769	–					
Registered voters/turnout	133,142	57.66					
Source: De Benoist

Elected members included:

- Cyrille Aguessy
- Justin Ahomadégbé-Tomêtin (African People's Bloc)
- Michel Ahouanmènou (Dahomeyan Progressive Union)
- Albert Akindès (Dahomeyan Progressive Union)
- Sourou-Migan Apithy (Dahomeyan Progressive Union)
- Dominique Aplogan (Dahomeyan Progressive Union)
- Tahirou Congacou (Dahomeyan Progressive Union)
- Francis Covi
- Adrien Degbey (Dahomeyan Progressive Union)
- Hubert Maga (Dahomeyan Progressive Union)
- Émile Poisson (African People's Bloc)
