= Assogba Oké =

Beninese politician and diplomat

Assogba Oké (3 February 1903 – 1973) was a Beninese politician and diplomat, mostly active when his country was known as Dahomey. Replacing Chabi Mama, Oké became Foreign Minister in 1960, serving until 1962.

== Biography ==
Oké was born in Adjohoun on 3 February 1903. He came from the Yoruba ethnic group and was educated at the Ecole William Ponty in Dakar. After graduation, he returned to Dahomey to work as a high school teacher. In the Oueme region, Oké developed a following among the citizenry. He was elected to the First Territorial Assembly and the Second Territorial Assembly in 1957. He became close to Sourou-Migan Apithy and was a member of his Parti Républicain Dahoméen (PRD). Between 1956 and 1961 he was Secretary General of the PRD.

In 1958, Oké was appointed Minister of Education and Youth and served until 1960. He was also designated Vice Prime Minister of Dahomey under Hubert Maga. He was appointed Minister of Defense in November 1960 and served for one month in this capacity. He became Foreign Minister in December 1960 and was Dahomey's chief diplomat until February 1962. He replaced Benin's first Foreign Minister, Chabi Mama, in this capacity. On 23 February 1961, he established diplomatic ties with Vatican City. In 1961, many members of the PRD wanted Oké to replace Apithy as Leader of the Party after he was eclipsed. Oké became Civil Service Minister in February 1962.

In the wake of the 1963 Dahomeyan coup d'état, Oké was arrested for attempting to restore Maga to the presidency. He had an advisory role in the administrations of Apithy and Justin Ahomadégbé-Tomêtin. Oké joined the Economic and Social Council in 1968. He died in 1973.

== Notes ==
Political offices
Preceded by Chabi Mama	Foreign Minister of Benin; 1960–1962	Succeeded by Émile Zinsou
