= Dahomeyan Progressive Party =

Dahomeyan Progressive Party Parti Progressiste Dahoméen
- Founder: Sourou-Migan Apithy; Hubert Maga
- Founded: 1958
- Dissolved: 1959
- Merger of: Republican Party of Dahomey; Dahomeyan Democratic Rally
- Succeeded by: Dahomeyan Unity Party

The Dahomeyan Progressive Party (French: Parti Progressiste Dahoméen, PPD) was a short-lived political party in French Dahomey.

== History ==
The party was established in 1958 as by the merger of the Republican Party of Dahomey led by Sourou-Migan Apithy and the Dahomeyan Democratic Rally led by Hubert Maga. It affiliated with the African Regroupment Party.

However, the party collapsed the following year due to internal disagreements over the future relationship with France. As a result, the two factions split back into the original parties. The following year they merged again, this time alongside the National Liberation Movement to form the Dahomeyan Unity Party.
