= List of prime ministers of Benin =

Prime Minister of the Republic of Benin
- Flag of Benin

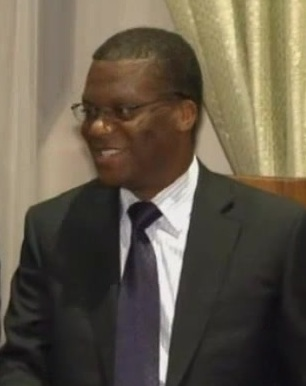
- Longest serving Pascal Koupaki; 28 May 2011 – 11 August 2013
- Status: Abolished
- Appointer: President of Benin
- Formation: 22 May 1959 (pre-independence); 1 August 1960 (post-independence)
- First holder: Hubert Maga
- Final holder: Lionel Zinsou
- Abolished: 6 April 2016

This is a list of prime ministers of Benin (formerly Dahomey) since the formation of the post of Prime Minister in 1960, to its abolition in 2016.

A total of six people have served as Prime Minister (not counting one Acting Prime Minister).

== List of officeholders ==
Political parties

Dahomeyan Unity Party (PDU)
Dahomeyan Democratic Party (PDD)
Democratic Renewal Party (PRD)
Cowry Forces for an Emerging Benin (FCBE)

Other factions

Military
Independent

Status

Denotes acting prime minister

No.	Portrait	Name (Birth–Death)	Term of office			Political party	President(s)
No.	Portrait	Name (Birth–Death)	Took office	Left office	Time in office	Political party	President(s)
Republic of Dahomey (1958–1975) (Note: Became independent on 1 August 1960.)
1		Hubert Maga (1916–2000)	22 May 1959	31 December 1960	1 year, 223 days	Independent	Himself
1		Hubert Maga (1916–2000)	22 May 1959	31 December 1960	1 year, 223 days	PDU	Himself
Post abolished (31 December 1960 – 25 January 1964)
2		Justin Ahomadégbé-Tomêtin (1917–2002)	25 January 1964	29 November 1965	1 year, 308 days	PDD	Migan Apithy
2		Justin Ahomadégbé-Tomêtin (1917–2002)	25 January 1964	29 November 1965	1 year, 308 days	PDD	Himself
Post abolished (29 November 1965 – 21 December 1967)
3		Maurice Kouandété (1932–2003)	21 December 1967	17 July 1968	209 days	Military	Alley
Post abolished (17 July 1968 – 30 November 1975)
People's Republic of Benin (1975–1990)
Post abolished (30 November 1975 – 1 March 1990)
Republic of Benin (1990–present)
Post abolished (1 – 12 March 1990)
–		Nicéphore Soglo (born 1934) acting	12 March 1990	4 April 1991	1 year, 23 days	Independent	Kérékou
Post abolished (4 April 1991 – 9 April 1996)
4		Adrien Houngbédji (born 1942)	9 April 1996	14 May 1998	2 years, 35 days	PRD	Kérékou
Post abolished (14 May 1998 – 28 May 2011)
5		Pascal Koupaki (born 1951)	28 May 2011	11 August 2013	2 years, 75 days	FCBE	Boni
Post abolished (11 August 2013 – 18 June 2015)
6		Lionel Zinsou (born 1953)	18 June 2015	6 April 2016	293 days	FCBE	Boni
Post abolished (6 April 2016 – present)

== See also ==
- President of Benin
  - List of presidents of Benin
- Vice President of Benin
- List of colonial governors of Dahomey
- Politics of Benin
