= Dahomeyan Unity Party =

Dahomeyan Unity Party Parti Dahoméen de l'Unité
- Founded: 13 November 1960
- Dissolved: 13 November 1963
- Merger of: Republican Party of Dahomey; Dahomeyan Democratic Rally; National Liberation Movement
- Succeeded by: Dahomeyan Democratic Party
- Headquarters: Porto-Novo, Dahomey
- Ideology: African nationalism African socialism Republicanism; Faction: Welfarism; Pro-Foreign investment Pro-Private ownership Nationalism; Anti-Colonialism

Party flag

The Dahomeyan Unity Party (French: Parti Dahoméen de l'Unité, PDU) was a political party in the Republic of Dahomey.

== History ==
The party was established on 13 November 1960 by the merger of the Republican Party of Dahomey (PRD) led by Sourou-Migan Apithy, the Dahomeyan Democratic Rally (RDD) led by Hubert Maga and the National Liberation Movement (MLN) led by Jean Pliya and Albert Teveodjré. The PRD and the RDD had previously merged in 1958 to form the Dahomeyan Progressive Party, but had split the following year. Chabi Mama became the new party's secretary general.

Changes to the electoral system made by Maga allowed the PDU to win all 60 seats in the Dahomeyan parliamentary election, 1960. The following year, the main opposition party, the Dahomeyan Democratic Union, was banned and its leader Justin Ahomadégbé-Tomêtin imprisoned. As a result, the PDU became the sole legal party in the country.

The party was dissolved on 13 November 1963 by Christophe Soglo after Hubert Maga was overthrown in a coup, and a new party, the Dahomeyan Democratic Party was formed by Apithy and Justin Ahomadégbé-Tomêtin.
