= African People's Bloc =

Political party in French Dahomey

African People's Bloc Bloc Populaire Africain
- Abbreviation: BPA
- Founder: Justin Ahomadégbé-Tomêtin; Émile Poisson
- Founded: 1946
- Dissolved: July 1955
- Split from: Dahomeyan Progressive Union
- Merged into: Dahomeyan Democratic Union

The African People's Bloc (French: Bloc Populaire Africain, BPA) was a political party in French Dahomey (now Benin).

== History ==
The party was established in 1946 by Justin Ahomadégbé-Tomêtin and Émile Poisson due to their dissatisfaction with the policies of the Dahomeyan Progressive Union (UPD). In the 1946–47 General Council elections the party won 6 of the 30 seats, finishing second to the Dahomeyan Progressive Union; Ahomadégbé-Tomêtin and Poisson were both elected. The party failed to win a seat in the French National Assembly in the 1951 elections, but won four seats in the 1952 Territorial Assembly elections.

In 1955 the party merged with the UPD to form the Dahomeyan Democratic Union.
