= Albert Tévoédjrè =

Beninese politician and writer (1929–2019)

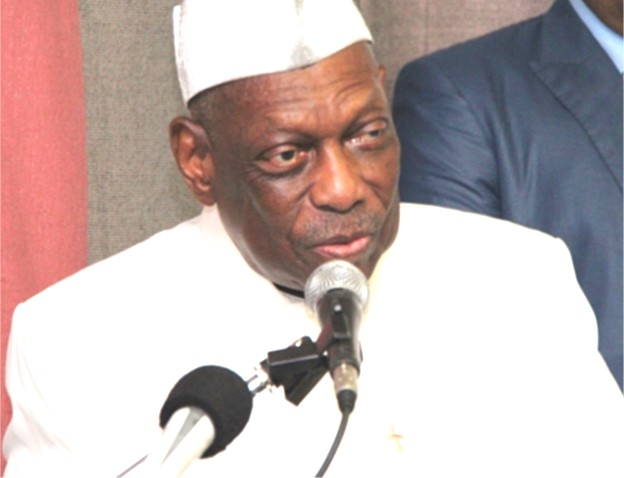
- Albert Tévoédjré Portrait

Information Minister of Dahomey
- In office 30 December 1960 – 22 October 1963
- Preceded by: None (office established)

Personal details
- Born: 10 November 1929 Porto-Novo, Dahomey
- Died: 6 November 2019 (aged 89) Porto-Novo, Benin
- Party: Dahomeyan Unity Party

Albert Tévoédjrè (10 November 1929 – 6 November 2019) was a Beninese writer and politician. He was Information Minister of Dahomey (now Benin) from 1960 to 1963.

== Early life ==
Tévoédjrè was educated at Toulouse, Fribourg and the Graduate Institute of International Studies in Geneva. He taught at secondary schools at Cahors, Dakar and Porto-Novo before travelling to Paris to pursue a writing career. While in Paris he wrote L'Afrique révoltée in 1958 and Afrique debout in 1959. He also served as editor in chief of the left-wing newspaper L'Étudiant Noir. During this time he frequented left-wing circles to discuss political affairs. At these and various cultural conferences across Europe and Asia, he learned to speak German, English and Spanish, besides his native French.

Before Benin declared its independence, Tévoédjrè helped found the pro-independence organization Mouvement Africain de Libération Nationale and the Ligue pour la Promotion Africaine, as well as leading the Syndicat National des Ensignants du Dahomey. In February 1960, Tévoédjrè participated in a strike at the Technical College of Cotonou. The demonstrators requested to fire two professors who failed several students and had them expelled.

== Political career ==
In October 1960, Tévoédjrè applied for a government position. He received the job of administrative secretary of the Dahomeyan Unity Party (PDU). His first job was to announce that a group of people were to inform the uneducated about news from the government perspective. Those who were literate could read three government-sponsored newspapers: L'Aube Nouvelle, La Nation and La Depeche du Dahomey. Tévoédjrè had previously written columns for one of these, L'Aube Nouvelle.

President Maga named the new ministers in his government on 30 December, and chose many leaders from the former RDD and PND. He also chose several relative newcomers, like Bertin Borna under the Labor and Civil Service, and Tévoédjrè, the new Information Minister. At this position he began suspending the publication of Justin Ahomadegbé-Tomêtin's opposition newspaper, Dahomey-Matin, and its predecessor, Cotonou-Matin, in April 1961. This was in accordance with a law limiting the freedom of speech passed in February of that year.

On 26 May Tévoédjrè notified Maga that Ahomadégbé-Tomêtin had plotted to assassinate the president but he and 11 other dissidents had been arrested. The trial date was set for December. It differed from many political trials in Africa being that it was held in public and the defence was allowed a lawyer from Paris. In any event, Ahomadégbé-Tomêtin received five years for his role in the conspiracy, and the others were dealt from one- to ten-year sentences. Maga ultimately released them in November 1962, saying in a broadcast (Note: It is unclear what type of broadcast this was.) that it was not only due to their good behavior in jail but also to reconcile with his former enemies.

Tévoédjrè convinced the Dahomeyan government to create an Agence Dahomennée de Presse to be led by him, and before the year was over he had access to the Agence France-Presse's wire services and a monopoly in Dahomeyan journalism. Another project of his was the construction of a museum to encompass all of Dahomey's art pieces. In July 1961, he was granted a 30-kilowatt transmitter, seven times more powerful than that owned by Radio Dahomey, by the Division of Information of the Company of Broadcasting of France of Overseas (SORAFOM). The Information Minister was named secretary-general of the African and Malagasy Union in November 1961.

In the summer of 1963, Dahomey underwent much unrest over the death of deputy Daniel Dessou. On 28 October Chief of Staff of the 800-man Dahomeyan Army Christophe Soglo took control of the country to prevent a civil war. He dismissed the cabinet, dissolved the Assembly, suspended the constitution and banned any type of demonstrations. No longer a member of Beninese politics, in 1964 Tévoédjrè was appointed to work at the International Affairs Center at Harvard University. He also taught at the Geneva Graduate Institute of International Studies and Georgetown University.

In 1991, he was a presidential candidate and placed third with over 14% of the vote.

Tévoédjrè died on 6 November 2019 in Porto-Novo at the age of 89.

== Bibliography ==
- Carter, Gwendolen Margaret (1963), Five African States; Responses to Diversity: the Congo, Dahomey, the Cameroun Federal Republic, the Rhodesias and Nyasaland, South Africa, Ithaca, New York: Cornell University Press, OCLC 413212.
- Keesing's Worldwide, LLC (November 1963), "Nov 1963 - Fall of President Maga's Regime. - Formation of Provisional Military Government", Keesing's Contemporary Archives, 9, London, ISSN 0022-9679, OCLC 1644683.
- Matthews, Ronald (1966), African Powder Keg: Revolt and Dissent in Six Emergent Nations, London: The Bodley Head, OCLC 246401461.
