= Dahomeyan Democratic Movement =

Political party in French Dahomey

Dahomeyan Democratic Movement Mouvement Démocratique Dahoméen
- Leader: Hubert Maga
- Founded: 1951
- Dissolved: 1957
- Split from: Dahomeyan Progressive Union
- Merged into: Dahomeyan Democratic Rally

The Dahomeyan Democratic Movement (French: Mouvement Démocratique Dahoméen, MDD) was a political party in French Dahomey.

== History ==
The MDD was established in northern Dahomey by Hubert Maga in 1951 as the Ethnic Group of the North (Groupement Ethnique du Nord, GEN). Maga had previously been a member of the ruling Dahomeyan Progressive Union, but was encouraged to split from the party by the local French administrator Roger Péperty. Maga gained support from his Bariba people, and won one of the two Dahomey seats in the French National Assembly in the June 1951 elections.

The party won 9 of the 32 second college seats in the 1952 Territorial Assembly elections, emerging as the second-largest faction behind the Republican Party of Dahomey. In 1953 it became the Dahomeyan Democratic Movement. Maga was re-elected to the French National Assembly in 1956.

The MDD was reduced to six seats in the 1957 Territorial Assembly elections, and in August 1957, it merged with the Independents of the North party led by Paul Darboux to form the Dahomeyan Democratic Rally.
