= Francis Covi =

Dahomean politician (1906–1966)

Francis Marino Mensah Covi (5 February 1906 – 14 November 1966) was a Dahomeyan politician and educator.

== Biography ==
Covi was born in Ouidah on 5 February 1906. He earned admission to the Ecole William Ponty in Senegal in 1919 and also studied in Aix-en-Provence, France.

Covi returned to Dahomey in 1926 and became the leader of the Porto-Novo and later Cotonou school systems. He served in the General Council and later Territorial Assembly. From 1957 to 1959 he was president of the Territorial Assembly. On 30 April 1959, Covi became a senator in the French Community, serving until 16 March 1961. While serving in the French Community, Covi was Secretary of the Committee on Higher Education and cultural relations. He served as president of the Dahomeyan Unity Party and chaired the Finances and Budget Committees in the National Assembly. Covi died on 14 November 1966 in Porto-Novo.
