= Paul Darboux =

Beninese merchant and politician

Paul Darboux (10 May 1919 – 17 July 1985) was a Beninese merchant and politician, most active when his country was known as Dahomey.

== Early life ==
Darboux was born on 10 May 1919 in Cotonou, then the economic capital of French Dahomey, to a noble family from Djougou. He soon became a merchant, and a power base grew around him among the Dendi and Wangara peoples of the north. He had ambitions on the Dahomeyan political scene and helped finance Hubert Maga's campaigns for deputy.

== Political career ==
He founded his own political party, the Défense des Intérêts Économiques, in 1956. This would occasionally go under the names of Union des Indépendants du Dahomey or Indépendants du Nord during his long political career. In the 1957 Dahomeyan Territorial Assembly election, he narrowly won the district of Djougou and gained himself a seat. Darboux allied with Sourou-Migan Apithy, and was rewarded with the post of Minister of Labor and Social Affairs in Apithy's government of 1958. The new minister owned the trade union Syndicat des Commerçants Africains du Dahomey, which he used to advance his political aspirations.

President Hubert Maga retained Darboux in his administration from 1960 to 1963 as Minister of Economics and Commerce. He gained power in the Atakora region and hatred in Djougou. On October 28, 1963, Chief of Staff of the 800-man Dahomeyan Army Christophe Soglo overthrew Maga and established his own regime. In its wake, Darboux was imprisoned for mishandling fiscal resources. His whereabouts were unknown until 1970, when he campaigned for Maga in the upcoming election. When a Presidential Council form of government was established that year, Darboux was voted president of the Assemblée Consultative Nationale, a consultative assembly. After the October 1972 coup, the Assemblée was dismissed.

In 1974, he went into exile in Côte d'Ivoire, and died on 17 July 1985 in Abidjan.

== Bibliography ==
- Decalo, Samuel (April 1973), "Regionalism, Politics, and the Military in Dahomey", The Journal of Developing Areas, 7 (3), College of Business, Tennessee State University: 449–478, JSTOR 4190033.
- Decalo, Samuel (1976), Historical Dictionary of Dahomey (People's Republic of Benin), Metuchen, New Jersey: Scarecrow Press, ISBN 0-8108-0833-1, OCLC 82503.
