= Dahomeyan Progressive Union =

Political party in French Dahomey

Dahomeyan Progressive Union Union Progressiste Dahoméenne
- Founder: Augustin Azango; Émile Derlin Zinsou
- Founded: April 1946
- Dissolved: 1955
- Merged into: Dahomeyan Democratic Union
- Ideology: Faction: Nationalism
- International affiliation: Rassemblement Démocratique Africain (until 1948)

The Dahomeyean Progressive Union (French: Union Progressiste Dahoméenne, UPD) was a political party in Dahomey.

== History ==
The party was established in April 1946 by Augustin Kokou Azango and Émile Derlin Zinsou, and was the first political party in the territory. It was initially affiliated with the African Democratic Rally, but dropped its link in 1948. A breakaway in 1946 lead to the creation of the African People's Bloc, but the party still won the 1946–47 General Council elections, taking 20 of the 30 seats.

Another breakaway occurred between 1950 and 1951, when Hubert Maga left the UPD to establish the Ethnic Group of the North under encouragement from Roger Péperty, the northern area's French administrator. Sourou-Migan Apithy also left the party in 1951 to establish the Republican Party of Dahomey.

After losing the 1952 Territorial Assembly elections to the Republican Party of Dahomey, the UPD formed an alliance with the African People's Bloc, which led to the creation of the Dahomeyan Democratic Union in 1955.
