= Jean Pliya =

Beninese writer (1931–2015)

- Jean Pliya
- Born: July 21, 1931; Djougou, Benin
- Died: May 14, 2015 (aged 83); Abidjan, Ivory Coast
- Education: University of Dakar; University of Toulouse
- Occupations: Writer, Teacher
- Writing career
- Language: French
- Genre: Novel
- Notable awards: Grand prix littéraire d'Afrique noire, 1967
- Website: jeanpliya.com

Jean Pliya (July 21, 1931 – May 14, 2015) was a Beninese playwright and short story writer.

== Life ==
Born in what was then Dahomey, Pliya was educated at the University of Dakar and then the University of Toulouse. He graduated from the second in 1957 and in 1959 returned to his homeland to teach. He went on to hold ministerial positions in the Benin government.

== Work ==
His work often considers colonial history and issues of values. He has also attempted to translate the Fon people's tales for a French-speaking audience.

== Publications ==
- L'Arbre fétiche, recueil de nouvelles ("L'Arbre fétiche", "La Voiture rouge", "L'homme qui avait tout donné", "Le Gardien de nuit"), Yaoundé: Éditions CLE, 1971
- Kondo le requin, consacré au roi Behanzin, Yaoundé: CLE, 1981 (Grand prix littéraire d'Afrique noire)
- Les Chimpanzés amoureux, Le Rendez-vous, La Palabre de la dernière chance, nouvelles, les Classiques africains, 1977
- La Secrétaire particulière, Yaoundé: Éditions CLE, 1973
- Les Tresseurs de cordes, Paris, Hatier, Abidjan: CEDA, 1987
- La Fille têtue, contes et récits traditionnels du Bénin, Abidjan; Dakar; Lomé: Nouvelles Éditions africaines, 1982.
