= Dahomeyan Democratic Rally =

Political party in French Dahomey

Dahomeyan Democratic Rally Rassemblement démocratique dahoméen
- Leader: Hubert Maga
- Founded: August 1957
- Dissolved: 1958
- Merger of: Dahomeyan Democratic Movement; Union of Independents of Dahomey
- Merged into: Dahomeyan Progressive Party
- Ideology: Nationalism

The Dahomeyan Democratic Rally (French: Rassemblement Démocratique Dahoméen, RDD) was a political party in French Dahomey led by Hubert Maga.

== History ==
The party was established in August 1957 by a merger of the Dahomeyan Democratic Movement led by Maga and the Independents of the North party led by Paul Darboux. However, Darboux left the party shortly after its establishment and refounded his party as the Union of Independents of Dahomey.

Like most other parties in Dahomey, it was a regional one and was heavily backed by the northern section of the French colony (particularly among the Bariba) without much support elsewhere. However, it suffered from internal rivalries between factions based in Parakou and Nikki and conflict between the Bariba and Dendi.

In 1958 the party merged with the Yoruba-dominated Republican Party of Dahomey (PRD) led by Sourou-Migan Apithy to form the Dahomeyan Progressive Party, which was to be the Dahomeyan branch of the African Regroupment Party. However, internal disagreements led to the parties splitting back into their original forms in 1959. The RDD won 22 seats in the 1959 elections, and in 1960 agreed to merge with the PRD again, this time under the name Dahomeyan Unity Party.

The party was briefly re-established as the Dahomeyan National Union (Union Nationale Dahoméene) following a coup by Christophe Soglo in 1965. However, all parties were banned by Soglo in December 1965.
