= Republic of Dahomey =

1958–1975 state in West Africa, now known as Benin

Coordinates: 6°28′N 2°36′E

Republic of Dahomey République du Dahomey (French)
- 1958–1975
- Flag (1958—1964) (1964—1975) Coat of arms
- Motto: "Fraternité, Justice, Travail" (French); Fraternity, Justice, Labour
- Anthem: L'Aube nouvelle (French) "The Dawn of a New Day"
- Status: Self-governing colony of France (1958–1960)
- Capital: Porto-Novo
- Common languages: French, Yoruba, Fon
- Government: Presidential republic (1960–1963, 1964–1965, 1968–1970); Military dictatorship (1963–1964, 1965–1968, 1972–1975)
- President
  - 1960–1963: Hubert Maga
  - 1972–1975: Mathieu Kérékou
- Prime Minister
  - 1960: Hubert Maga
  - 1967–1968: Maurice Kouandété
- Vice President
  - 1960–1963: Sourou-Migan Apithy
  - 1964–1965: Justin Ahomadégbé-Tomêtin
- Historical era: Cold War
  - Self-governing colony: 4 December 1958
  - Independence: 1 August 1960
  - Fort of São João Baptista de Ajudá seized: 1 August 1961
  - Renamed: 30 November 1975
- Currency: CFA franc
- ISO 3166 code: DY
Preceded by	Succeeded by
French Dahomey; Fort of São João Baptista de Ajudá	People's Republic of Benin
- Today part of: Benin

The Republic of Dahomey (/dəˈhoʊmi/; French: République du Dahomey; pronounced [daɔmɛ], [daɔme]), simply known as Dahomey (Fon: Danhomè), was established on 4 December 1958, as a self-governing colony within the French Community. Prior to attaining autonomy, it had been French Dahomey, part of the French Union. On 1 August 1960, it attained full independence from France.

In 1975, the country was renamed Benin after the Bight of Benin (which was in turn named after the Kingdom of Benin which had its seat of power in Benin City, modern-day Nigeria), since "Benin" was deemed politically neutral for all ethnic groups in the state, whereas "Dahomey" recalled the Fon-dominated Kingdom of Dahomey.

== History ==
The Republic of Dahomey became independent of France on 1 August 1960. In the words of the historian Martin Meredith, the young country "was encumbered with every imaginable difficulty: a small strip of territory jutting inland from the coast, it was crowded, insolvent and beset by tribal divisions, huge debts, unemployment, frequent strikes and an unending struggle for power between three rival political leaders". These rivals were Justin Ahomadégbé-Tomêtin, who held sway in the southern and central regions of the country, Sourou-Migan Apithy, who dominated the southeast, and Hubert Maga, whose power base was located in the north.

Upon independence, Maga became the first president of Dahomey. A political crisis in 1958, prior to independence, had led to Maga's Dahomeyan Democratic Movement joining a coalition government, with a subsequent crisis leading to Maga becoming the head of government in April 1959. This compromise, however, was unable to solve Dahomey's problems, and an uprising broke out in October 1963, culminating in a coup d'état, and the replacement of Maga as president with Apithy. This also failed to bring about stability, and Apithy was removed in another coup, in December 1965.

Following the 1965 coup, Colonel Christophe Soglo became president. A veteran of the French Army, he saw himself as a Dahomeyan Charles de Gaulle, banning all political activity with the stated aim of stabilising the country. Civilian rule was in fact restored in 1968, but the tumult of the preceding years meant that the army remained a key player in Dahomeyan politics, with civilian presidents beholden to their military backers. In October 1972, a coup (the fifth in the country's history) led by Mathieu Kérékou removed a civilian government (which had been headed by a triumvirate consisting of Ahomadégbé, Apithy and Maga). Kérékou would go on to proclaim his support for Marxism–Leninism, declaring the end of the Republic of Dahomey and the establishment of the People's Republic of Benin on 30 November 1975.

== In film ==
Dahomey was chosen for some of the filming locations in the 1967 film The Comedians, with an all-star cast that included Richard Burton, Elizabeth Taylor, Lillian Gish, James Earl Jones, Roscoe Lee Browne, Alec Guinness, Raymond St. Jacques, Gloria Foster, Zakes Mokae, Paul Ford, Georg Stanford Brown, Peter Ustinov, Douta Seck and Cicely Tyson. The movie is the story of an adulterous affair, placed against the backdrop of Haiti during the tumultuous dictatorship of François Duvalier (known as Papa Doc). Dahomey resembled Haiti in many ways, both geographically and culturally, and it was safer to film there than in Haiti.

== See also ==
- 1963 Dahomeyan coup d'état
- Sahel-Benin Union
