= Chabi Mama =

Beninese politician

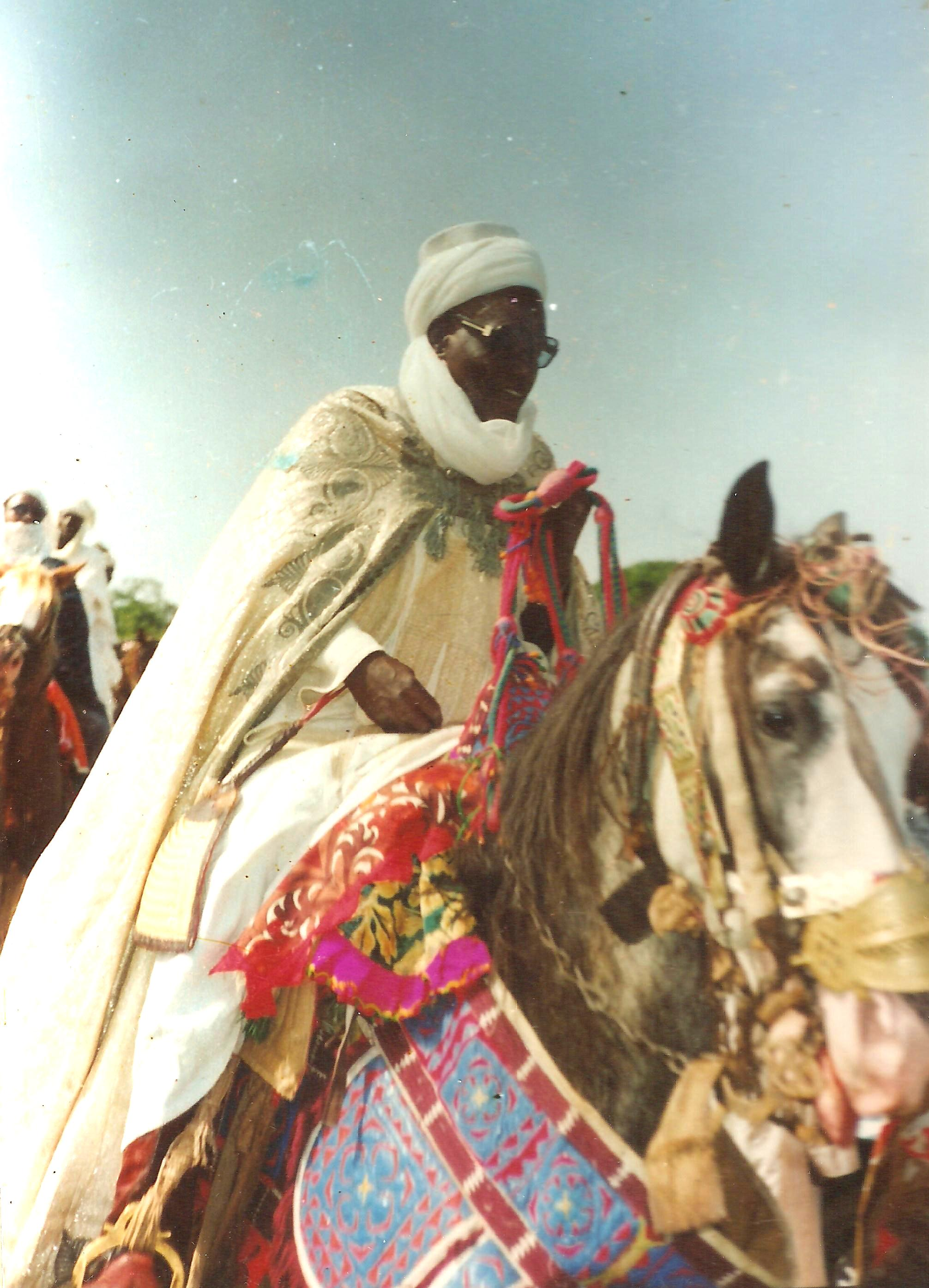
- Born: 15 July 1921
- Died: 2001 (aged 79–80)
- Occupation: Beninese politician

Chabi Mama (15 July 1921 – 10 May 1996 or 2001) was an early Beninese politician. He became the foreign minister of newly independent Dahomey (now Benin) in 1959, lasting in that position until 1960. He then returned to that position from 1963 to 1964.

Political offices
Preceded by non-existent	Foreign Minister of Benin; 1959–1960	Succeeded by Assogba Oké
Preceded by Hubert Maga	Foreign Minister of Benin; 1963–1964	Succeeded by Gabriel Lozès
