= Émile Poisson =

Beninese politician

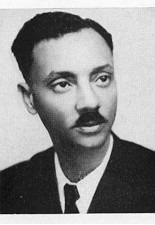

Émile Poisson (25 May 1905 in Ouidah, Dahomey – 4 June 1999 in Paris) was a politician from Benin who served in the French Senate from 1947 to 1955. He was a métis. Prior to election to the French Senate he had been a schoolmaster.
