= Republican Party of Dahomey =

Republican Party of Dahomey Parti républicain dahoméen
- Leader: Sourou Migan Apithy
- Founded: 1951
- Dissolved: 1960
- Merged into: Dahomeyan Unity Party

The Republican Party of Dahomey (French: Parti Républicain Dahoméen, PRD) was a political party in French Dahomey led by Sourou-Migan Apithy.

== History ==
The party was established by Apithy in 1951. It emerged as the largest party in the 1952 Territorial Assembly elections, winning 19 of the 32 second college seats. The party came first in the 1956 French National Assembly elections, returning Apithy to the Assembly.

The PRD went on to win the 1957 Territorial Assembly elections, taking 35 of the 60 seats. In 1958 the party merged with the Dahomeyan Democratic Rally (RDD) to form the Dahomeyan Progressive Party, which was to be the Dahomeyan branch of the African Regroupment Party. However, internal disagreements led to the parties splitting back into their original forms in 1959.

The PRD also won the 1959 elections, despite receiving fewer votes than the Dahomeyan Democratic Union (UDD). Due to accusations of fraud, it later agreed to give nine seats to the UDD, but remained the largest party in the Assembly. In February 1960 it was transformed into the Dahomey Nationalist Party (Parti des Nationalistes du Dahomey, PND) after admitting federalists led by Émile Derlin Zinsou. In November 1960 the PND agreed to merge with the RDD and the National Liberation Movement led by Jean Pliya and Albert Teveodjré, this time under the name Dahomeyan Unity Party.
