= Hubert Maga =

Dahomey politician, former president (1916–2000)

Hubert Coutoucou Maga
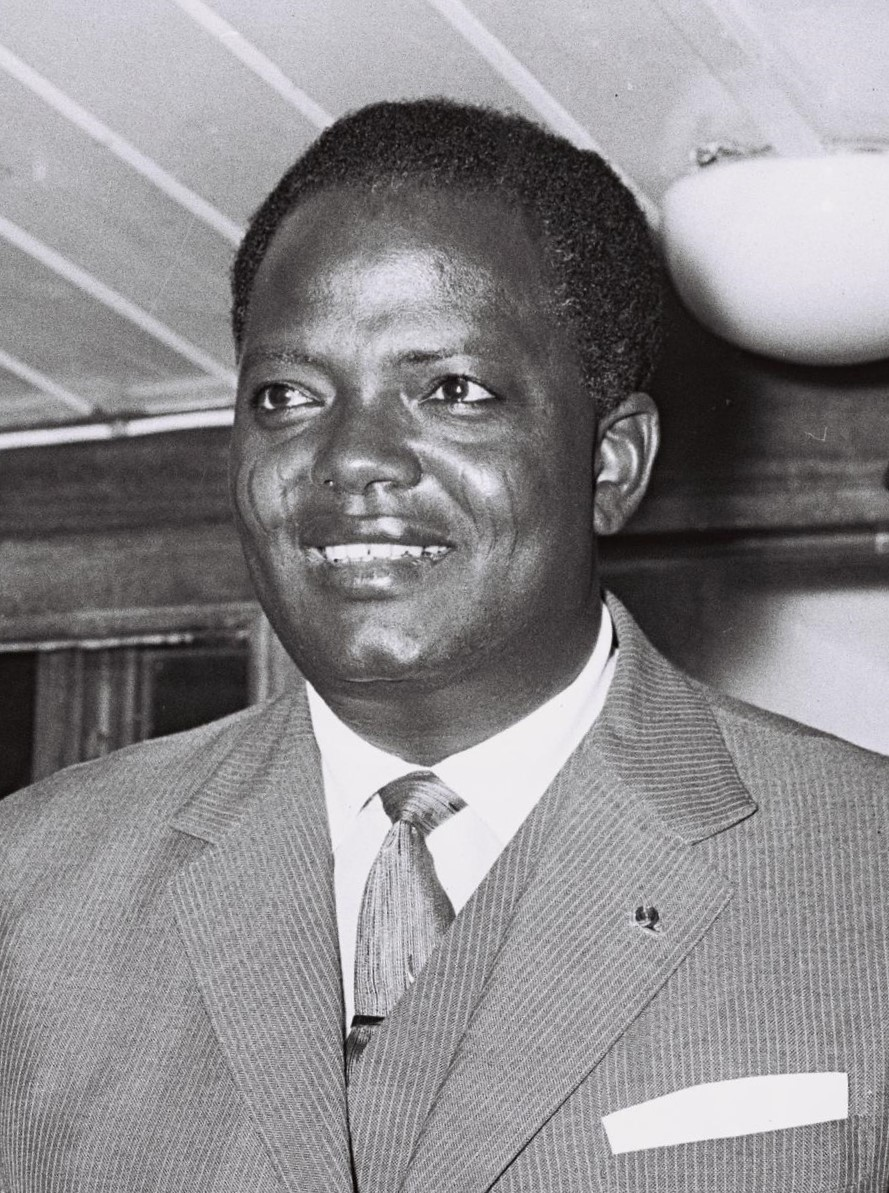
- President Hubert Maga, 1961

Chairman of the Presidential Council of Dahomey
- In office May 7, 1970 – May 7, 1972
- Vice President: Justin Ahomadégbé-Tomêtin
- Preceded by: Paul-Émile de Souza (Chairman of the Military Directorate)
- Succeeded by: Justin Ahomadégbé-Tomêtin

1st President of Dahomey
- In office August 1, 1960 – October 28, 1963
- Vice President: Sourou-Migan Apithy
- Preceded by: Office established
- Succeeded by: Christophe Soglo

Premier of Dahomey
- In office May 22, 1959 – August 1, 1960
- Preceded by: Sourou-Migan Apithy
- Succeeded by: Office abolished

Deputy to the French National Assembly
- In office June 17, 1951 – May 22, 1959

Personal details
- Born: August 10, 1916 Parakou, Dahomey
- Died: May 8, 2000 (aged 83) Cotonou, Benin
- Party: UPD; GEN; MDD; RDD
- Spouse: Marie Do Régo

Hubert Coutoucou Maga (August 10, 1916 – May 8, 2000) was a politician from Dahomey (now known as Benin). Born a peasant in 1916, Maga served as a schoolmaster from 1936 to 1945, during which time he gradually gained considerable influence among the uneducated. He rose to power despite regionalist politics in Dahomey, and was elected to Dahomey's territorial assembly in 1947 and founded the Northern Ethnical Group, later renamed the Dahomey Democratic Rally (Rassemblement Démocratique du Dahomé). In 1951, Maga was elected to the French National Assembly, where he served in various positions, including premier from 1959 to 1960. When Dahomey gained its independence from France on August 1, 1960, Maga was appointed to the presidency, and was officially elected to that post on December 11.

During Maga's term of office, Dahomey's economy collapsed; there was little foreign investment and unemployment rose. In response, he launched a four-year plan in January 1962, the basis of which was to increase agricultural production by forcing the nation's youths to work on the land. Maga also faced a national crisis of unity, culminating in a failed assassination plot against him in May 1961 led by the main opposition leader, Justin Ahomadegbé-Tomêtin. Ahomadegbé-Tomêtin was jailed, and by the time of his release in November 1962, a one-party state had been established and the opposition press had been restricted. In 1963, convicted murderer Christophe Bokhiri was released from prison, prompting riots around the country, but the focus of the rioting soon shifted toward Maga's problems as president. The riots became so serious that the Chief of Staff of the Dahomeyan Army, Christophe Soglo, took control of the country in October to prevent a civil war. After forcing Maga to resign, Soglo gave him, Ahomadégbé-Tomêtin, and vice president Sourou Migan Apithy, the titles of Minister of State.

Shortly afterwards, Maga was convicted of plotting to assassinate Soglo and of corruption, for which he was incarcerated. Following his release in 1965, he took refuge in Togo before moving to Paris. In 1970, he returned to Dahomey to serve as head of a rotating three-man Presidential Council, which included Ahomadegbé-Tomêtin and Apithy. On October 26, 1972, Mathieu Kérékou was installed by a coup, overthrowing then-chairman Ahomadegbé-Tomêtin. Maga and the other members of the council were imprisoned until 1981. Maga retired from public life after his release, only making an appearance at the National Conference of 1990, which gave amnesty to all Beninese political refugees. He died on May 8, 2000.

== Education and teaching career ==
Maga was born on August 10 or August 19, 1916 to a peasant family in Parakou, northern Dahomey. Maga claimed he was a descendant of the Kingdom of Bourgou's royal family. His Bariba mother and Voltaic father raised him in the Islamic faith.

His education began at Parakou, where his teacher was Emile Derlin Zinsou's father, followed by schools in Bohicon and Abomey. Maga moved to Porto-Novo to be educated at the Victor Ballot School, where he remained for three years. During his subsequent schooling at the Ponty Normal School in Dakar, Maga became friends with Hamani Diori, the future president of Niger.

In his twenties Maga converted to Roman Catholicism which, according to journalist Ronald Matthews, "was not so common for a northerner". He became a teacher at Natitingou in 1935. In 1939, he married a fellow Christian, a nurse by profession, and the daughter of a prominent Brazilian of Fon origins from Ouidah. (Note: Her name is unknown.) Marriages between northern and southern Dahomeyans were uncommon at the time.

Maga was appointed director of the school in 1945. Along with his new wife, he began to increase his influence among uneducated citizens. He worked for trade unions after World War II, and led the Syndicat des instituteurs du Dahomey (Teachers' Union of Dahomey).

== Political background ==
Maga's rise to power occurred during a period of intense regionalism, spurred by the historical resentment shared by members of the former kingdoms of Abomey, Porto-Novo, and disorganised tribes from the north. Its result was the creation of three de facto tribal zones: the north, southeast, and southwest, which were led by Maga, Sourou Migan Apithy, and Justin Ahomadégbé-Tomêtin, respectively. Maga's Ethnic Group of the North (later the Dahomeyan Democratic Movement), which merged into the Dahomeyan Democratic Rally in 1957, received little support outside his northern headquarters. Even then, most of his backing came from the Bariba, while Apithy was mostly backed by the Yoruba and Ahomadégbé-Tomêtin, the Fon and Gouns. Regionalistic attitudes would only intensify during the rest of the political careers of the three men, collectively known as Dahomey's triumvirate.

== Early political career ==
Maga was elected a general adviser for the Atakora region in 1945, and, two years later, was appointed to the Grand Council of French West Africa, in which he served until 1952. Following his election to the Dahomey General Council in 1947, Maga resigned his teaching post. He subsequently became vice president of the assembly until his resignation in 1957.

Roger Peperty, the French chef de cercle of Natitingou and a close acquaintance, encouraged Maga to form an alliance among northerners in early 1949. He wrote in a political report later that year:

I have suggested to Maga that he constitute a separate group with his Northerners. He liked the idea ... Later I repeated the question. It seems again possible that Mr. Maga might constitute the group in question.

He feared that Maga would lean "toward the R.D.A. [African Democratic Rally]" and wanted the young politician to form a different group. The party was to become the Groupement Ethnique de Nord (Northern Ethnic Group). Maga, in an April 1968 interview, denied that Peperty ever played a part in the establishment. He claimed that he and his friends came up with the idea.

In the legislative elections of June 17, 1951, when Dahomey was allowed an additional representative in the French National Assembly, Maga ran for that office. The fact that two seats were allotted to Dahomey was only known in the last week of April. As per a May 1951 electoral law, each party list was required to include two candidates for the two seats, and the candidates whose names appeared first on the two lists receiving the most votes were elected. Maga decided to run with René Deroux, an African medical officer. Capitalising on growing cynicism regarding southern Dahomey dominating the French colony's politics, he allied himself with the northern tribes.

The May 1951 law also enlarged the electorate from 61,958 to 333,693. Some dead people were even counted as electors due to the mishandling of election cards. The Cotonou newspaper L'Etoile du Dahomey noted a man who gave an unlimited number of cards as long as they promised to vote for Maga's main opponent, accountant and deputy Sourou-Migan Apithy. Altogether, however, only 44% of the population voted on election day. Apithy was reelected a deputy with 53,463 votes out of 147,350 cast, while Maga captured the second seat with 49,329 and third candidate Emile Derlin Zinsou received a mere 18,410 ballots. Several smaller parties hosted several other candidates, which received the rest of the votes. Only 0.5 percent of Maga's votes came from the coastal region, while 98 percent came from northern towns and villages. The 1951 election has been cited as when regionalist parties arose, and it was the first whose pamphlets mentioned ethnicity.

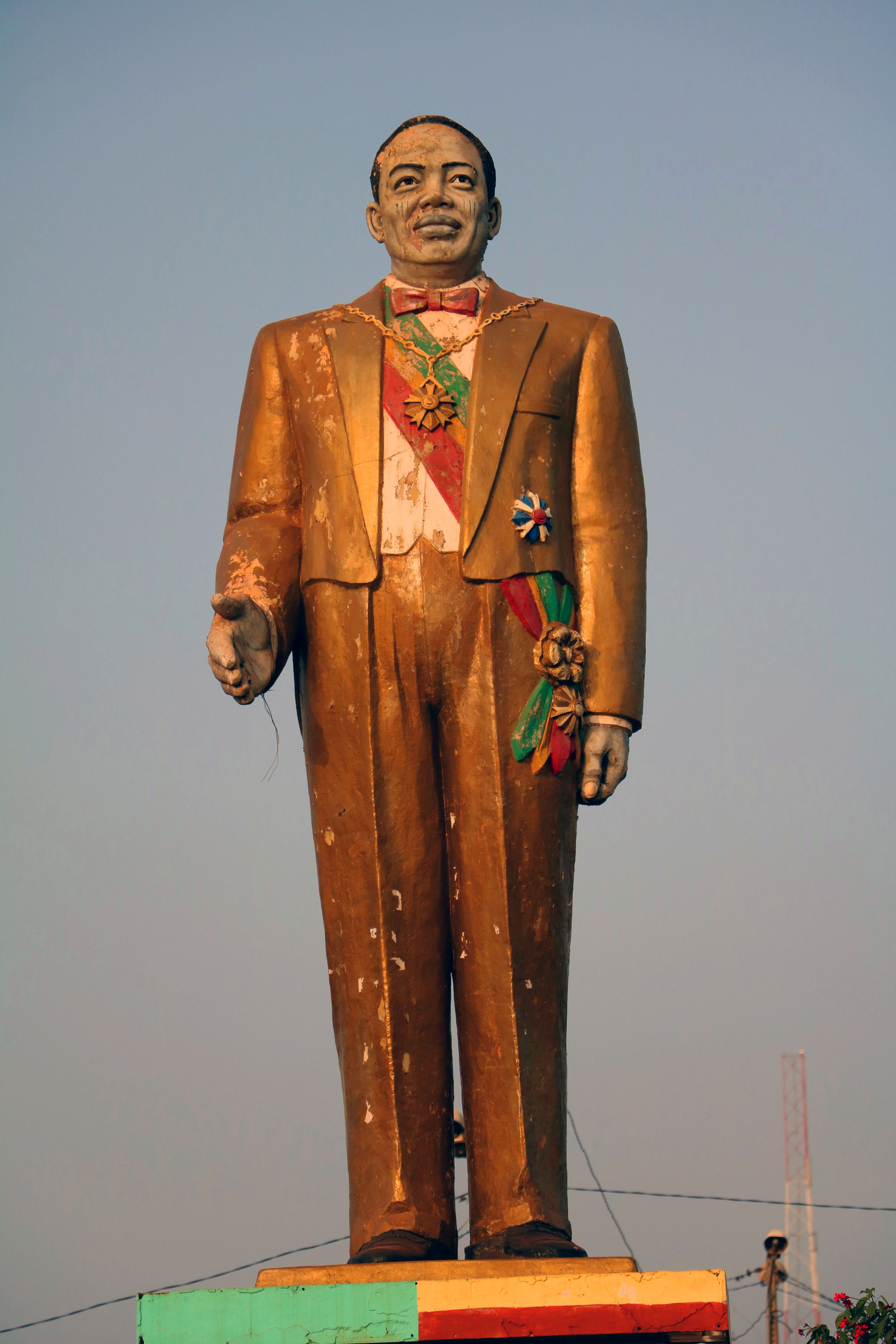
Statue of Hubert Maga

== Deputy to the French National Assembly ==
In Paris, Maga affiliated himself with the Overseas Independents, a political organization led by Leopold Sedar Senghor of Senegal. However, he was not an ardent supporter of this organization; this lack of commitment was typical of Maga in the following years. He was named the secretary of the Finance Committee, a member of the committee on national education, and a member of the committee on parliamentary privileges. During his first term in the Assembly, he accomplished little apart from proposing a bill on May 13, 1954, that concerned the election of counselors of the Republic from its overseas territories and Trust Territories. With the support of his new party, Maga ran for the renewal of his mandate at the legislative elections held on January 2, 1956. Standing for an "active federalism within the French union", Maga chose Gaustin Gbaguidi as his running mate. Of the 179,119 votes cast, Maga won 60,601 and Apithy won 64,344.

Later that year, he resigned from his position on the Grand Council of French West Africa. Shortly afterwards, Maga became a member of the committees on national education and on justice and legislation, and was named Secretary of the Assemblée on January 25, 1956. When Félix Gaillard became Prime Minister of France in November 1957, he appointed Maga to the position of Secretary of State of Labor, a post he served in until the end of the Gaillard ministry on April 15, 1958.

Before the territorial elections of 1959, Maga agreed that the R.D.D. would field candidates only in the north of the country if in return Apithy's Republican Party of Dahomey (P.R.D.) ran only in the south. The result of the elections was that the P.R.D. received 37 seats with 144,038 votes, the R.D.D. received 22 seats with 62,132 votes, and Justin Ahomadégbé-Tomêtin's Dahomey Democratic Union (U.D.D.) received 11 deputies for its 162,179 votes. What followed was described by Matthews as "an immediate explosion". Supporters of Ahomadégbé-Tomêtin took to the streets in rioting so severe that French soldiers were called in to restore order. Following mediation by Félix Houphouët-Boigny, Apithy and Ahomadégbé-Tomêtin agreed to divide between them 18 contested seats in a southwest constituency. However, Ahomadégbé-Tomêtin made it clear that he would not agree to let Apithy retain the office of Prime Minister of Dahomey. Maga was chosen as a compromise for the premiership, and was voted into this post on May 22, 1959.

== Premier of Dahomey ==
Maga's election coincided with a collapse of the colonial economy. There was little foreign investment in the country, and unemployment was rising. He thus felt that a consultation with the trade unions was necessary before selecting a Minister of Labor, and eventually appointed Paul Darboux to the office. Although Apithy wanted to return to his former position as Prime Minister, he was instead appointed Minister of State without responsibility for any specific department.

In his policy speech upon receiving the premiership, Maga asked his fellow Dahomeyans to end the tribalism that had characterised his country's politics. He appealed for unity among Apithy and Ahomadégbé-Tomêtin supporters and encouraged investments into the economy. Foreign affairs dominated Maga's first months in office, but at home the desire for an independent Dahomey was mounting. Apithy announced on September 2, 1959, that he would remove all P.R.D. deputies from the government if Maga did not establish referendums on Dahomey's political status. Maga reacted by dismissing Apithy from his cabinet on September 18, and warning P.R.D. deputies that the same would happen to any of them who opposed him on the matter.

Nevertheless, a referendum on independence for Dahomey was held on September 28. It offered Dahomeyans three choices regarding the preferred political status: become a French département, join the French community and become a semi-autonomous state, or obtain full independence. The Dahomeyan people chose the second option, semi-autonomy, and full independence was scheduled for 1960. The premier announced on January 1, that:

On September 28, 1959, we freely chose the route of cooperation with France, within the framework of the Community. We do not contemplate and we will never contemplate leaving the Franco-African ensemble ... The choice in the future presuppose certain conditions. Given our financial and economic situation, would it be reasonable for us to assume new responsibilities at a time when we are not capable of confronting the present [financial] difficulties?

Popular opinion was soon behind Maga instead of Apithy. Maga began to form an alliance with Ahomadegbé-Tomêtin, especially after Apithy voted in favor of joining the short-lived Mali Federation, an idea that Maga opposed. In response, the premier added more U.D.D. deputies to his government in a January 1960 cabinet reshuffle. However, they became more vocal in trying to take over Dahomey. Maga began to ally with Chabi Mama and Arouna Mama, who became his closest colleagues.

On August 1, 1960, Maga traveled to Paris to discuss Dahomey's political future with Houphouët-Boigny. Following their negotiations, Dahomey was granted its independence. On Maga's return to his home country on June 13, he claimed that he had personally requested autonomy. Maga was chosen as Dahoomey's first president.

== President of Dahomey ==
=== De facto president ===
Experience has shown that neither a two party nor a three party system can lead Dahomey out of its present stagnation. Only a majority party that truly represents the nation can, under the circumstances, reach decisions that are acceptable to the bulk of the population. I refer to a truly majority party, and not an artificial coalition.

— Justin Ahomadégbé-Tomêtin

Shortly after independence, the three parties united as the Front d'Action Patriotique (Patriotic Action Front, or F.A.P.), and reorganised Dahomey into one electoral constituency. It was proposed that there would be an agreed list of electoral candidates, and that all of the legislative seats would be given to the party with the highest number of elected representatives from that list. This arrangement did not last long; Ahomadégbé-Tomêtin broke from the union and, using the discontent among people over the increasing rarity of jobs in the country, incited demonstrations that lasted from September to October 1960. He nevertheless tried to disassociate himself from the rioting. In September, he claimed that a single party state was the only solution to the stagnation of the economy. Since he had recently renounced one party, he was looking for another party to lead.

Dahomey faced a major economic recession. The country had not had a favorable trade balance since 1924, and now that it was independent, France no longer offered subsidies. Maga helped to counter this by investing in the infrastructure and encouraging civil servants to take Dahomey as their residence. Still, Dahomey's GDP grew by 1.4 percent annually from 1957 to 1965, making Dahomey's economy one of the weakest in Africa.

Meanwhile, Maga made Houphouët-Boigny recognize the R.D.D. as the Dahomeyan wing of his African Democratic Rally (R.D.A.). Ahomadégbé-Tomêtin had always believed that the U.D.D. was the sole representative of the Rally. This had helped bring a new political philosophy to the R.D.D., which had, up to this point, done little more than express regionalism without much of a platform.

At the end of October, Ahomadégbé-Tomêtin convinced the trade unions that he controlled to begin another strike in protest against Maga's inability to promote national development, and to ensure the welfare of the working class. The strike lasted for two days in the cities of Porto-Novo and Cotonou, and became so serious that the police used tear gas. It ended when Maga sent down faithful Northerners armed with bows and arrows to patrol the streets at night. On November 2, members of the U.D.D. organized a motion of censure in the National Assembly. Maga relied on Apithy's assistance in opposing the motion, and it was ultimately defeated.

=== New constitution and official election ===
Following the motion of censure's defeat, U.D.D. deputies began to resign from their jobs, and five were dismissed. They were replaced by deputies from the P.R.D. On November 13 the P.R.D. and R.D.D. officially merged to form the Dahomeyan Unity Party (P.D.U.) and Maga was elected as its leader. He created a constitution for Dahomey, styling it after that of the French Fifth Republic. The assembly, now led by Djibode Aplogan, adopted the constitution on November 25. The new constitution gave the president the right to ask the National Assembly to reconsider a bill if it did not pass with two-thirds of the votes, and submit referendums. Maga assumed the powers of Commander in Chief of the Dahomeyan Army, although he did not wear its uniform until its capture of the Portuguese enclave of Ajuda on August 1, 1961.

A recently passed electoral law meant that every party that stood in the upcoming official elections had to list candidates for all 60 National Assembly deputies, as well as for president and vice president. Maga's only presidential opponent was Ahomadegbé-Tomêtin, whose running mate was Sacca Koto Ngobi. On December 11, 1960, Maga was formally elected as president for a five-year term; he received 468,002 votes, and Apithy vice president with the same term of office. Of Dahomey's 971,012 registered voters, 71 percent voted in the election. The P.D.U. received 69 percent of the vote and all 60 seats in the National Assembly. Although the U.D.D. received 31 percent of the popular vote, it did not have a single deputy in the assembly.

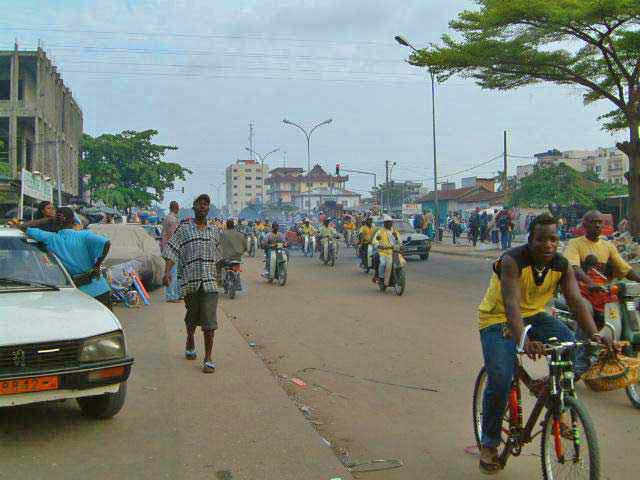
After the 1960 election, Maga and his ministers moved their offices from Porto-Novo to Cotonou (pictured).

Maga's original cabinet resigned on December 29. He named the new ministers in his government the next day, and chose many leaders from the former R.D.D. and P.N.D. He appointed Arouna Mama as the Minister of the Interior; Assogba Oké to the post of Foreign Affairs; Paul Darboux to Trade and Economics; Sébastien Dassi to Agriculture; Victorien Gbaguidi to Transport and Public Works; Joseph Kekeh to Justice; René Deroux to Health and Social Affairs; Michel Ahouanmènou to Education; and Alexandre Adandé as Finance Minister. Newcomers were Bertin Borna, Labor and Civil Service; and Albert Teveodjré, the new Information Minister. To prevent a backlash from the opposition, Maga and his ministers moved their offices from Porto-Novo to Cotonou, where the U.D.D had received 90 percent of the vote in the recent election.

=== Crackdown on opposition and four year plan ===
In early 1961, the president began applying repressive measures on the opposition press and anyone suspected of trouble-making, thus effectively silencing Ahomadégbé-Tomêtin's voice in the country. The U.D.D.'s newspaper, Dahomey-Matin, was shut down in February. Maga commissioned a group of people to announce news to the uneducated from the government perspective. Ahomadégbé-Tomêtin's trade unions were superseded by Maga's General Union of Dahomeyan Workers. The General Union was instantly recognized as the only representative of the General Union of Black American Workers in Dahomey.

By April, most U.D.D. members had expressed their interest in joining the P.D.U., which Maga encouraged. Ahomadégbé-Tomêtin did not share his colleagues' keenness; nevertheless, the choice was soon made for him—the U.D.D. was dissolved by Maga on April 11, and less than a week later, so were Ahomadégbé-Tomêtin's trade unions. Maga declared that the country of Dahomey "ha[d] at last been born." Since Ahomadégbé-Tomêtin was unable and unwilling to pursue a coup d'état, he decided to conspire against the president.

On May 26, Albert Teveodjré notified Maga that Ahomadégbé-Tomêtin had plotted to assassinate the president. He and 11 other dissidents were arrested, and a trial date was set for December. The trial differed from many others held in Africa in that it was conducted in public, and the defendants were represented by a lawyer from Paris. Ahomadégbé-Tomêtin received five years in jail for his role in the conspiracy, and the others received sentences from one to ten years. Maga ultimately released them on November 3, 1962, saying in a broadcast (Note: It is unclear what type of broadcast this was.) that it was not only due to their good behavior in jail but also to reconcile with his former enemies.

With the threat from his enemies thus removed, Maga could focus on developing the national economy. He designed a four-year growth plan, to begin on January 1, 1962, that contained many ambitious acts, though this was frequently revised to be more realistic. It was designed to increase agricultural yields and was financed by French capital. Part of the plan was to cut wages by ten percent. Young Dahomeyans would contribute "human investment", or forced labor on the fields. If they failed to do so, Maga would revoke their citizenship and disqualify them from citizenship in nations in the African and Malagasy Union.

To ensure against a student uprising, the president combined the two major youth organizations in Dahomey, chapters of the World Federation of Youth and the World Federation of Democratic Youth, into the National Union of Dahomeyan Youth. It was to remain a nationally run organization, unaffiliated with any international institution. Nonetheless, he would do nothing more than reprimand students who protested him, not even revoke their scholarships. On December 31, 1961, the Maga administration raised certain taxes, including those on income, transportation, and permits in an attempt to balance his country's budget. He nonetheless ran into trouble in the enforcement of his plan. Throughout his first term as president, Maga toured various parts of Dahomey to bring enthusiasm to his plan, offering undeveloped land to its supporters.

Despite the economic hardship, the president commissioned French architect Chomette to design a presidential palace. At a cost of US$3 million, the building dominated Cotonou's promenade on its completion in 1963. (Note: This would cost roughly US$21,449,000 today. See Inflation Calculator.) The new palace contained a golden and marble porch, mosaic stairwells, pebble dash walls, and a two-story flag outdoors.

Maga decided to reshuffle the cabinet in February 1962. He added the Planning and Development duties to Apithy's office to quench his thirst for power. Nonetheless, Apithy accused Maga of being a dictator, and a series of demonstrations the Vice President coordinated would ultimately force Maga out of office. These were not sparked by Maga himself, but rather the murder of David Dessou.

=== Dessou riots and 1963 coup d'état ===
January 1962 saw the poisoning of Dessou, an official of the Sakete sub-prefecture. The deputy from his constituency, named Christophe Bokhiri, was accused of the crime and duly arrested. He was released after his fellow deputies in the National Assembly requested to suspend proceedings against him under the parliamentary immunity clauses of the Dahomey Constitution, specifically Article 37. Maga, meanwhile, was away in Paris during all of this.

The people of Dahomey were outraged at Bokhiri's release. Racial clashes broke out in the summer of 1963, as the murderer and the victim were of different tribes. Demonstrations were organized in Porto-Novo on October 21 and soon spread to Cotonou. They remained somewhat orderly before the trade unionists were involved. While still led by Maga, the trade unionists were still upset by the wage cut and used the case to further their interests. In addition, they criticized what they called Maga's "squander-mania", such as the construction of a presidential palace. Most of the demonstrations were peaceful, although several demonstrators destroyed a hospital sign containing Maga's name. Six trade unionists were arrested on the second day of demonstrations, causing the unions to call a general strike. By the end of the second day, protesters forced the National Assembly to put Bokhiri back in jail, and the Assembly simultaneously enforced a curfew.

In light of these events, Maga canceled his trip to the United States and returned to Dahomey immediately. Appealing for peace, he convened a special National Assembly session. The protesters and trade unionists were indifferent to his efforts toward reconciliation. When Maga agreed with their demands and replaced his government with a provisional one in which Apithy and Ahomadégbé-Tomêtin had equal standing, they organized themselves to protest this new order. Armed northerners came down to Cotonou to support Maga and clashed with dissenters, killing two. The protesters, however, would not return to their jobs until Maga no longer held his.

They were to get their wish. On October 28 Chief of Staff of the 800-man Dahomeyan Army Christophe Soglo took control of the country to prevent a civil war. He dismissed the cabinet, dissolved the Assembly, suspended the constitution, and banned any type of demonstrations. After having Maga sign his resignation the same day he gave Maga, Apithy, and Ahomadégbé-Tomêtin the powers of the Ministry of State. Southern Dahomey later created a statue in honor of this day in national history.

== Minister of State and house arrest ==
The provisional government dissolved the P.D.U. and replaced it with a Dahomeyan Democratic Party (P.D.D.). It announced that a referendum on the status of the constitution was to be held on December 15. At the same time, a committee was established to investigate alleged wrongdoings by the Maga administration. In late November it began prosecuting members of the cabinet, including the Minister of National Economy and the Finance Minister, for misusing public funds.

Despite the friendly relationship between the two men, Soglo held Maga responsible for an assassination plot against him which was discovered in early December. Maga resigned his position in the provisional government on December 4, shortly before being placed under house arrest in an unidentified village. He was accompanied by a butler, a cook, and a driver. Four former cabinet members. were placed in less comfortable prisons. At an official inquiry, the conspiracy charge was dropped, but Maga was found guilty of corruption.

In May 1964, Chabi Mama and a devoted group of Maga supporters tried to remove him from house arrest and reinstate the overthrown president back into power. Author Elisa Daggs called their campaigns "a rampage of terrorism." They grew so intense that the military was called in to quell the uprisings. At least one of their goals was accomplished in March 1965 when, following a retrial, Maga was released from house arrest. He went into exile in Togo before moving to Paris.

During Maga's exile, a number of coups were attempted against Presidents Soglo, Apithy, and Ahomadégbé-Tomêtin and their putschists. In order to gain power back, Maga formed a new party while in exile, the Union Nationale Dahoméenne (U.N.D.), on December 9, 1965. It was little more than a vehicle to be recognised in the upcoming elections, to be held before January 18, 1966. Maga and Apithy banded together to protest a special session of the National Assembly on December 21, 1965, that would vote on a new constitution for Dahomey, and the session was never held. Academic Dov Ronen speculates that this was because there would be no vice-presidents in the constitution, and the two politicians figured that a coalition would guarantee high offices for both. Neither was to witness a political comeback on January 18, as Soglo seized power on December 22 of the previous year and refused to hold elections.

More coups were to follow, and eventually the military decided to return to civilian rule. All former presidents, vice presidents, government ministers, and National Assembly presidents were disqualified from Dahomey's first election since 1964, held on May 15, 1968, by incumbent Alphonse Amadou Alley. In response, Maga and Apithy staged protests while Ahomadégbé-Tomêtin supported an obscure candidate named Basile Adjou Moumouni. Moumouni won the election with 80 percent of the vote, but the result was declared void because the protest prevented nearly three-quarters of the electorate from voting. This result sparked further demonstrations, and Maga, Soglo, Apithy, and Ahomadégbé-Tomêtin were forbidden to enter the country, in an attempt to crack down on dissent.

In the wake of further coups, politician Emile Derlin Zinsou was appointed civilian President of Dahomey by the military on June 17, 1968. Maga, Apithy, and Ahomadégbé-Tomêtin unified in Paris in opposing the appointment. They established the National Front for the Struggle of Dahomey, whose members promised "not to participate in any government, not to accept the authority of any president who is unacceptable by any of the living forces and the people of Dahomey." The triumvirate attempted another boycott of Zinsou's appointal and the subsequent referendum he chose to hold. However, the plan was not successful, and he was confirmed President of Dahomey on July 28 with 76.4 percent of the electorate voting for him.

== 1970 election ==
On December 10, 1969, Zinsou was overthrown by Maurice Kouandété, who had installed him as president in the first place. The military, however, refused to recognize Kouandété, and as the two men could not reach agreement, a Military Directorate was established with Paul Emile de Souza as its chairman. An election was held on March 28, 1970, to determine the true president. On this occasion, the triumvirate was allowed to campaign, and they did not miss the chance. Intimidation and bribery were commonplace, and the electoral campaign saw the comeback of regional loyalties. It was also marked by a series of violent outbursts; invalidated reports state that six people were killed or wounded at incidents in Parakou on the eve of the elections. Fellow candidate Zinsou asserted that Maga supporters had killed one of his supporters during said incidents.

These charges did not affect Maga's standing in the polls; he received a majority of the vote in the north, and Apithy and Ahomadégbé-Tomêtin received a majority in the southeast and southwest/central, respectively. The election results were as follows: 252,551 citizens voted for Maga; 200,091 for Ahomadégbé-Tomêtin, and 186,332 for Apithy. In the entire south, Maga received 24,000 votes compared to the 180,000 who voted for him in the Borgou Department, obtaining 97.3 percent of the 78 percent turnout. Zinsou, running to counter the constant tribal clashes, received 3 percent, with 17,551 votes.

Nonetheless, de Souza decided to nullify the results from Atakora, the region where Maga received the most votes, on April 3. Outraged, Maga formed the Assembly of the Peoples of the North, which threatened to secede unless he was declared President. He refused to leave his campaign headquarters at Parakou even to attend political meetings. Maga's reaction to the nullification prompted many southern workers to flee the north. Apithy stated that he would convince his region to join Nigeria if Maga took the presidency and took steps to bribe his way into that office. Ahomadégbé-Tomêtin claimed Maga had defrauded the electoral system to his advantage. In contrast with the other three former presidents, Zinsou admitted that he had been defeated and decided participate in bargaining, explaining that he rejected the idea of a coalition "for personal reasons". The other former Presidents, on the other hand, agreed to a hasty compromise on April 13 to prevent a civil war.

== Presidential council ==
=== Under Maga ===
A presidential council, consisting of Maga, Ahomadégbé-Tomêtin, and Apithy, was set up on May 7 with a presidency that changed every two years. Maga inaugurated this system for the first two years. Each man agreed to not use the military to extend their term or use any other means toward that consequence. If decisions were not unanimous during the first round of voting, a two councilman majority would suffice on the second round. The council served as the executive and legislative branch of Dahomey.

The cabinet was composed of four Ahomadégbé-Tomêtin allies, three Maga allies, and three allies of Apithy. Gabriel Lozes, appointed minister of finance; Theophile Paoletti, new minister of information and tourism; Edmond Doussou-Yovo, minister of education; and Karl Ahouansou, minister of communication, were all friends of Ahomadégbé-Tomêtin. Maga's colleagues in the cabinet were Pascal Chabi Kao, minister of finance; Albert Ouassa, minister of health; and Chabi Mama, minister of rural development; while Apithy friends were Ambroise Agboton, minister of labor; Joseph Keke, minister of economy and planning; and Michel Toko, minister of justice and guardian of the seals. Daouda Badarou, who had served as foreign minister under Zinsou, was allowed to keep his job.

Maga's economic policies during his chairmanship helped quiet union leaders whose protests during his presidency had been intense. He helped create a tax plan that would finance their salaries by cutting expenditures and cracking down on tax evasion. In 1970 Dahomey witnessed a surplus of 429 million CFA francs, rising to a 570 million CFA franc surplus the following year. With the national economy in a favorable position, Maga and the rest of the council could afford a number of luxuries, including three houses and three Mercedes-Benz 300 automobiles to be shared amongst themselves, and festivals for the anniversary of the founding of the triumvirate.

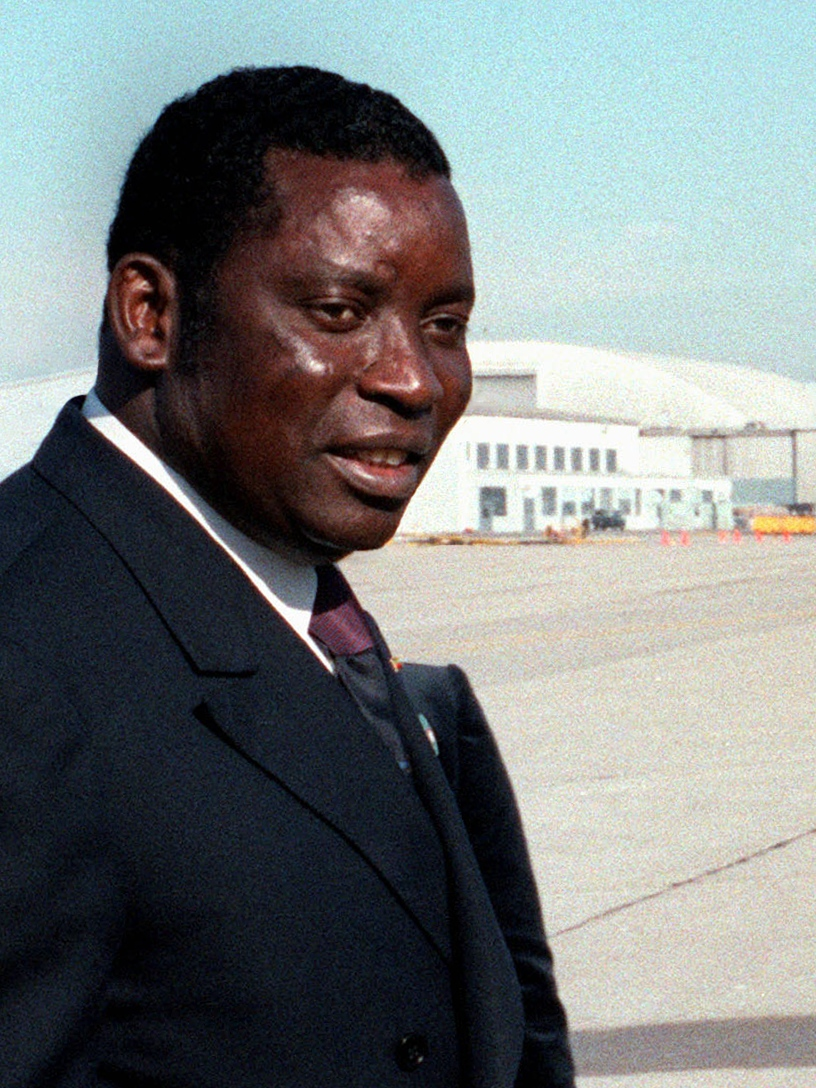
Togolese president Etienne Eyadema, who would later change his name to Gnassingbé Eyadéma. His decision to extradite opposition leader Noe Kutuklui, and the Presidential Council's agreement, helped to undermine its popularity.

The Council lost popularity with the Kutuklui Affair. By decree of Maga and the rest of the council, Togolese opposition leader Noe Kutuklui was officially expelled from Dahomey on October 27, 1971, where he had been practicing law since the late 1960s. It was at the request of General Etienne Eyadema, president of Togo, as Kutuklui had been involved in several plots against Eyadema's military government. The council's decision to extradite him spurred demonstrations in Cotonou. Maga was unable to carry out his decision; Alphonse Alley protected Kutuklui and took him to an unknown place outside of Dahomey. Col. Alley received no punishment whatsoever for his role in the Affair.

Students were some of those involved in the protests, and they soon had another reason to conflict with their government. On November 5, 1971, Maga and his administration shut down the Union Général des Etudiants et Eleves de Dahomey (UGEED), a radical youth group which sought to "transform Dahomey into a battlefield" using "workers, soldiers, and policemen." This stemmed from UGEED-sponsored demonstrations against the minister of education when he failed to attend an educational meeting. Students whose schools followed the strike were allowed back to school on November 19, and only if their parents signed documents that said they would not participate in more demonstrations. If they failed to comply, they would be expelled from the educational system of Dahomey. Government-instituted rallies were arranged to support the ban.

The military was also aroused. The formation of a presidential council only further enraged the army. Ahomadégbé-Tomêtin was ambushed while traveling to a rally in Abomey on May 7, 1971. Maga initially denied its existence, and to this day details are unclear. An artillery camp at Ouidah was the location of another military uprising on January 28, 1972. The president sent two officers to overpower the rebels although no punishment was undertaken. Both Ahomadégbé-Tomêtin and Maga believed that the latter incident was an attempted coup.

Kouandété attempted to usurp power again at dawn on February 23. When he first heard of the mutiny, Ahomadégbé-Tomêtin believed that it was an attempt by Maga to remain in power. Leading the Ouidah garrison, Kouandété also attempted to take over government buildings and murder de Souza. Over the course of the operation, assailant Major Moumouni was mortally wounded by de Souza's bullets. The plot was foiled, although Maga canceled a visit to France to attend to the matter at hand. A 12-member military commission would soon discover another plot, that would have been undertaken simultaneous to Kouandété's. According to its findings, Captains Glele and Pierre Boni were going to follow Kouandété until de Souza was assassinated, when they would eradicate their leader and insert Zinsou back into power. The recent events epitomised the council's "fear and contempt" for the military.

=== Under Ahomadégbé-Tomêtin ===
Maga transferred power to Ahomadégbé-Tomêtin on May 7, 1972. This was the first time in 12 years that the head of Dahomey was succeeded in a nonmilitary fashion. The new chairman congratulated Maga and praised the triumvirate as "one of [Dahomey's] most beneficial institutions." It was believed that the triumvirate would continually undermine each other, and the simple transition of power was viewed as a positive step toward Dahomeyan unity.

The Presidential Council was slow in organizing a military trial, and it did not begin until May 12. The court tried 21 men besides Kouandété, (Note: The true number of accused men was not known until the trial was convened.) mostly military officers but also including several commoners and even Maga bodyguards. The punishments were announced on May 16. Kouandété received the death penalty, as did Captains Josué and Glélé, Quartermaster Sergeant Agboton, and a corporal and a sergeant in absentia. Lesser sentences were handed to five men who were given life imprisonment, two who would serve 20 years in prison, another with 15 years, two with ten, and two with five. An additional four were acquitted. The sentences were never carried out; the jurors believed that Kouandété would seize power in another coup.

Another delayed function of the council was the formation of the Assemblée Consultative Nationale, an advisory assembly required by the 1970 constitution. As per the constitution, such an assembly would contain 30 members advising councilmen on economic, social, and other issues, with Paul Darboux presiding. It was not established until July 1972, due to, in the words of academic Samuel Decalo, "intensive horse-trading between the partners in the Presidential Council ... and pressures from their political lieutenants for a position in the Assembly."

One of the most notable aspects of Ahomadégbé-Tomêtin's time in power was the Kovacs Affair. It began with Pascal Chabi Kao being given a monopoly over selling official stationery to the Presidential Council and spread to claims of bribery and embezzlement. Ahomadégbé-Tomêtin tried to fire Chabi Kao, but Maga, who was Chabi Kao's mentor, refused. Maga convinced Apithy to help and the bill was vetoed.

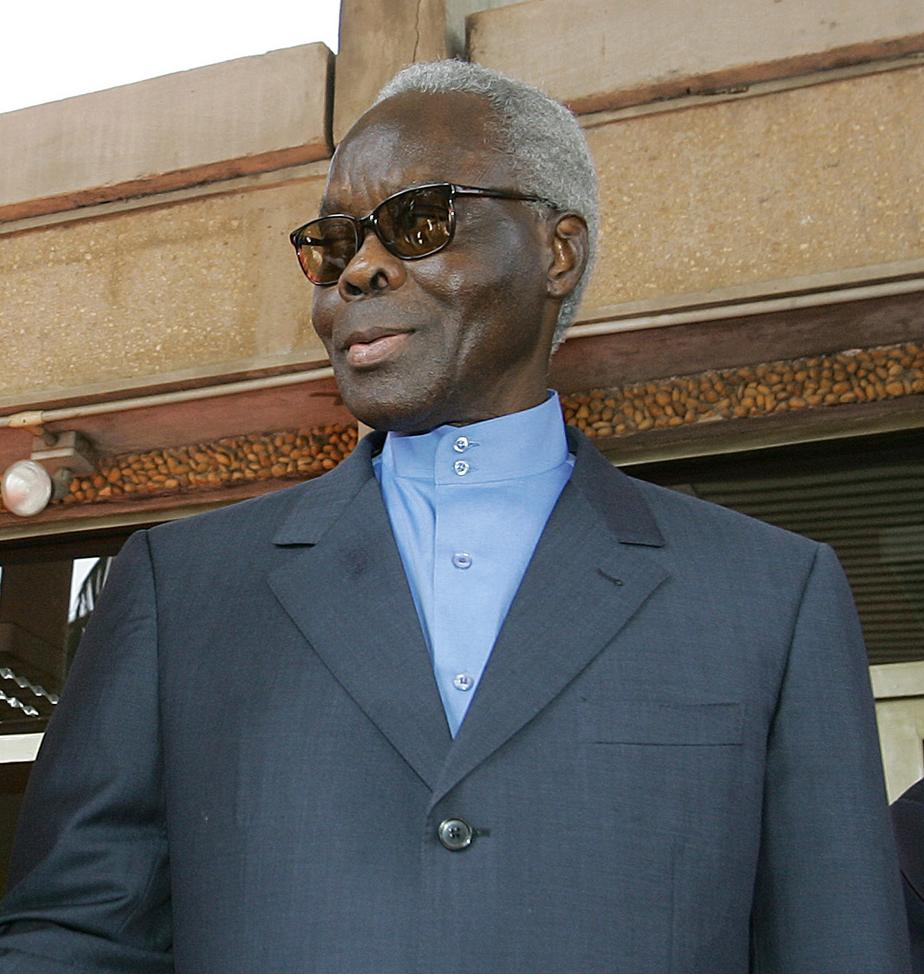
Mathieu Kérékou, who overthrew the Presidential Council in 1972, in a 2006 photograph

Another coup was launched by soldiers of the Ouidah garrison on October 26. This one, however, was successful, and Major Mathieu Kérékou was installed as president. It occurred during a cabinet meeting between Maga and Ahomadégbé-Tomêtin. (Note: Apithy was in Paris on a political trip.) Kérékou had served as Maga's aide-de-camp in 1961. According to reports at the scene, soldiers abruptly arrived in the Cabinet room of the presidential palace and started firing bullets, but no one was injured. Kérékou called the triumvirate "truly a monster" as it showed "unpardonable incompetence", amongst other charges which were used to justify the coup. Kouandété was pardoned, although the former council was not. Maga, Ahomadégbé-Tomêtin, and Apithy spent more than nine years in prison before being freed by Kérékou in 1981.

== Later life and death ==
Maga established the National Party for Democracy and Development in 1989 and participated in the National Conference of 1990, which gave amnesty to all Beninese political refugees. He also was a member of the High Council of the Republic before retiring from political life. He did make some public appearances, such as at independence day celebrations in 1998. At the time of his death, he sat upon the Constitutional Court of Dahomey. On May 8, 2000, Maga died of a heart attack in Cotonou. A hospital in Cotonou now bears his name.

== Honours ==
- Vatican City : Collar of the Order of Pope Pius IX (14/09/1962).
- Empire of Iran : Commemorative Medal of the 2500th Anniversary of the founding of the Persian Empire (14/10/1971).

== Bibliography ==
- Carter (1963), "Dahomey", in Margaret, Gwendolen (ed.), Five African States; Responses to Diversity: the Congo, Dahomey, the Cameroun Federal Republic, the Rhodesias and Nyasaland, South Africa, Ithaca, New York: Cornell University Press, OCLC 413212.
- Danopoulos, Constantine Panos (1988), The Decline of Military Regimes: The Civilian Influence, Boulder, Colorado: Westview Press, ISBN 0-8133-7304-2, OCLC 15162972.
- Daggs, Elisa (1970), All Africa: All Its Political Entities of Independent or Other Status, New York City: Hastings House, ISBN 0-8038-0336-2, OCLC 82503.
- Decalo, Samuel (December 1970), "Full Circle in Dahomey", African Studies Review, 13 (3), African Studies Association: 445–457, doi:10.2307/523497, JSTOR 523497, S2CID 143176760.
- Decalo, Samuel (April 1973), "Regionalism, Politics, and the Military in Dahomey", The Journal of Developing Areas, 7 (3), College of Business, Tennessee State University: 449–478, JSTOR 4190033.
- Decalo, Samuel (1976), Historical Dictionary of Dahomey (People's Republic of Benin), Metuchen, New Jersey: Scarecrow Press, ISBN 0-8108-0833-1, OCLC 1959674.
- Dossou-Yovo, Noel (September 1999), "The Experience of Benin", International Journal on World Peace, 16 (3), ISSN 0742-3640, OCLC 211426384 – via Questia.
- Ghana Information Services Department (1961), New Ghana, Government of Ghana.
- Hudgens, Jim; Trillo, Richard; Calonnec, Nathalie (2003), The Rough Guide to West Africa, London: Rough Guides, ISBN 1-84353-118-6, OCLC 176832097.
- Ihonvbere, Julius Omozuanvbo; Mbaku, John Mukum (2003), Political Liberalization and Democratization in Africa: Lessons from Country Experiences, Westport, Connecticut: Praeger, ISBN 0-313-05151-8, OCLC 60127996.
- Keesing's Worldwide, LLC. (November 1963), "November 1963 - Fall of President Maga's Regime. - Formation of Provisional Military Government", Keesing's Contemporary Archives, 9, London, ISSN 0022-9679, OCLC 1644683, archived from the original on 2012-02-15.
- Kneib, Martha (2007), Benin, Cultures of the World, Tarrytown, New York: Marshall Cavendish, ISBN 978-0-7614-2328-7, OCLC 62109915.
- Laitin, David D. (1986), Hegemony and Culture: Politics and Religious Change Among the Yoruba, Chicago: University of Chicago Press, ISBN 0-226-46790-2, OCLC 12946946.
- Matthews, Ronald (1966), African Powder Keg: Revolt and Dissent in Six Emergent Nations, London: The Bodley Head, OCLC 246401461.
- Ronen, Dov (1975), Dahomey: Between Tradition and Modernity, Ithaca, New York: Cornell University Press, ISBN 0-8014-0927-6, OCLC 1527290.
- Staniland, Martin (1973a), "The Three-Party System in Dahomey: I, 1946-1956", The Journal of African History, 14 (2), Cambridge University Press: 491–504, doi:10.1017/S0021853700012846, JSTOR 180543, S2CID 153322300.
- Staniland, Martin (1973b), "The Three-Party System in Dahomey: II, 1956-1957", The Journal of African History, 14 (3), Cambridge University Press: 291–312, doi:10.1017/S0021853700012573, JSTOR 180450, S2CID 162890004.
- West Africa Publishing Company (1971), West Africa.
- French National Assembly (1952). Recueil des textes authentiques des programmes et engagements électoraux des députés proclamés élus à la suite des élections générales du 17 juin 1951. 4. Paris: Imprimerie de l'Assemblée nationale. p. 1067.
