= French Dahomey =

French colony in West Africa (1894–1958); now Benin

Coordinates: 6°28′N 2°36′E

Colony of Dahomey and Dependencies Colonie du Dahomey et dépendances (French)
- 1894–1958
- Flag Coat of arms
- Anthem: La Marseillaise
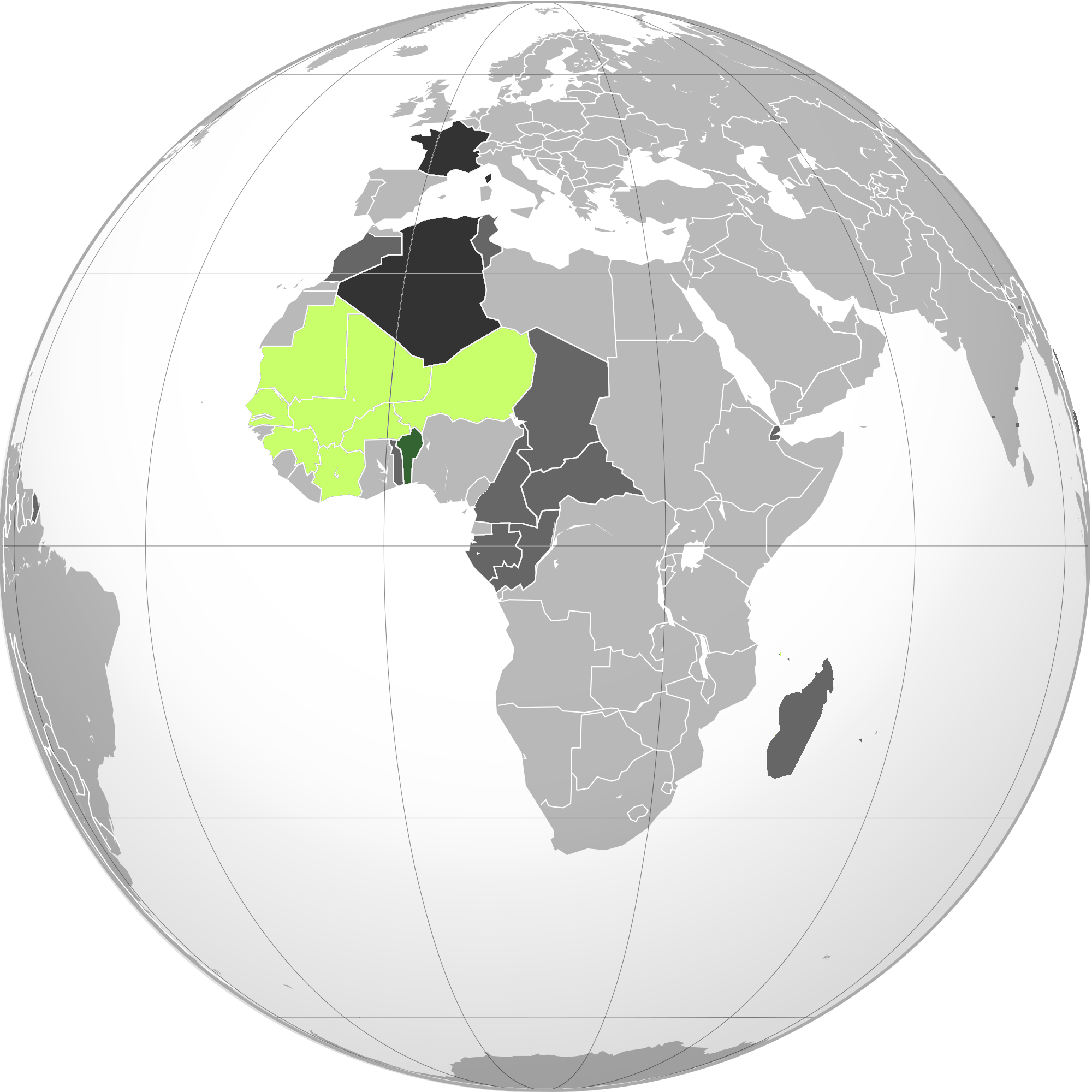
- Dark green: French Dahomey; Lime: Rest of French West Africa; Dark gray: Other French possessions Darkest gray: French Third Republic
- Status: Colony of France
- Capital: Porto-Novo
- Common languages: French (official); Bariba, Fon, Yoruba
- President
  - 1894–1895: Jean Casimir-Perier
  - 1959–1960: Charles de Gaulle
- History
  - Colonised: 1872
  - Protectorate: 1894
  - French West Africa: 27 October 1895
  - French Union: 4 September 1947
  - French Community: 4 December 1958
  - Independence: 1 August 1960
- Currency: French West African franc CFA franc
Preceded by	Succeeded by
Dahomey	French West Africa; Republic of Dahomey
- Today part of: Benin

French Dahomey, officially the Colony of Dahomey and Dependencies (French: Colonie du Dahomey et dépendances), was a French colony and part of French West Africa from 1894 to 1958. After World War II, by the establishment of the French Fourth Republic in 1947, Dahomey became part of the French Union with increased autonomy. On 4 October 1958, the French Fifth Republic was established, and the French Union became the French Community. The colony became the self-governing Republic of Dahomey within the Community, and two years later on 1 August 1960, it gained full independence, renamed to Benin in 1975.

== History ==
=== Kingdom of Dahomey ===
The Kingdom of Dahomey existed in the region from the 17th to 19th centuries.

=== Colony ===
The French takeover and colonization of the Kingdom of Dahomey began in 1872. The First Franco-Dahomean War in 1890 further weakened it. The Second Franco-Dahomean War resulted in it becoming a French protectorate in 1894.

A decree dated 22 June 1894 created the Colonie de Dahomey et dépendances ('Colony of Dahomey and Dependencies'), which was to be incorporated into French West Africa in 1904.

Under the French, a port was constructed at Cotonou, and railroads were built. School facilities were expanded by Roman Catholic missions. In 1946, Dahomey became an overseas territory, part of the French Union, with its own parliament and representation in the French national assembly.

On 4 December 1958, it became the Republic of Dahomey (République du Dahomey), self-governing within the French Community.

=== Independence ===
On 1 August 1960, the Republic of Dahomey gained full independence from France.

The republic's first president was Hubert Maga, who had been the Prime Minister during the overseas territory's last year under French rule.

== See also ==
- List of the colonial governors of French Dahomey
- Kingdom of Dahomey (c. 1600−1904)
- French West Africa
