= List of presidents of Benin =

This is a list of presidents of Benin (formerly Dahomey) since the formation of the post of President in 1960, to the present day.

== List of officeholders ==
Political parties

Dahomeyan Unity Party (PDU)
Dahomeyan Democratic Party (PDD)
People's Revolutionary Party of Benin (PRPB)
Action Front for Renewal and Development (FARD–Alafia)

Other factions

Military
Independent

Status

Denotes acting or interim head of state

No.	Portrait	Name (Birth–Beath)	Term of office			Political party	Elected	Government(s)
No.	Portrait	Name (Birth–Beath)	Took office	Left office	Time in office	Political party	Elected	Government(s)
Republic of Dahomey (1960–1975)
1		Hubert Maga (1916–2000)	1 August 1960	28 October 1963 (Deposed)	3 years, 88 days	Independent	–	Maga I
1		Hubert Maga (1916–2000)	1 August 1960	28 October 1963 (Deposed)	3 years, 88 days	PDU	1960	Maga I
–		Christophe Soglo (1909–1983) acting (Note: Styled as Head of the Provisional Government.)	28 October 1963	25 January 1964	89 days	Military	–	Maga I
2		Sourou-Migan Apithy (1913–1989)	25 January 1964	27 November 1965 (Resigned)	1 year, 306 days	PDD	1964	Apithy
–		Justin Ahomadégbé-Tomêtin (1917–2002) acting (Note: Styled as Provisional President.)	27 November 1965	29 November 1965	2 days	PDD	–	Apithy
–		Tahirou Congacou (1911–1993) acting (Note: As President of the National Assembly.)	29 November 1965	22 December 1965 (Deposed)	23 days	PDD	–	Apithy
3		Christophe Soglo (1909–1983)	22 December 1965	17 December 1967 (Deposed)	1 year, 360 days	Military	–	Soglo
–		Jean-Baptiste Hachème (1929–1998) acting (Note: Styled as Chairman of the Revolutionary Committee.)	17 December 1967	20 December 1967	3 days	Military	–	Revolutionary Committee
–		Maurice Kouandété (1932–2003) acting (Note: Styled as Chairman of the Revolutionary Committee.)	20 December 1967	21 December 1967	1 day	Military	–	Revolutionary Committee
–		Alphonse Alley (1930–1987) acting (Note: Styled as Chairman of the Revolutionary Committee and as Provisional President of the Provisional Government.)	21 December 1967	17 July 1968	209 days	Military	–	Revolutionary Committee
–		Alphonse Alley (1930–1987) acting	21 December 1967	17 July 1968	209 days	Military	–	Provisional Government
4		Émile Derlin Zinsou (1918–2016)	17 July 1968	10 December 1969 (Deposed)	1 year, 146 days	Independent	1968 (Jul)	Zinsou
–		Maurice Kouandété (1932–2003) acting (Note: Styled as Chief of Staff of the Army.)	10 December 1969	13 December 1969	3 days	Military	–	
–		Paul-Émile de Souza (1930–1999) (Note: Styled as Chairman of the Directory.)	13 December 1969	7 May 1970	145 days	Military	–	Directory
1		Hubert Maga (1916–2000) (Note: Styled as Chairman of the Presidential Council.)	7 May 1970	7 May 1972	2 years	Independent	1970	Maga II
5		Justin Ahomadégbé-Tomêtin (1917–2002)	7 May 1972	26 October 1972 (Deposed)	172 days	Independent	1970	Ahomadégbé-Tomêtin
6		Mathieu Kérékou (1933–2015)	26 October 1972	30 November 1975	3 years, 35 days	Military	–	Kérékou I
People's Republic of Benin (1975–1990)
(6)		Mathieu Kérékou (1933–2015)	30 November 1975	1 March 1990	14 years, 120 days	Military (Note: Retired from the military in 1987, with the rank of a general.)	1980	Central Committee
(6)		Mathieu Kérékou (1933–2015)	30 November 1975	1 March 1990	14 years, 120 days	Military	1984	Central Committee
(6)		Mathieu Kérékou (1933–2015)	30 November 1975	1 March 1990	14 years, 120 days	PRPB	1989	Central Committee
Republic of Benin (1990–present)
(6)		Mathieu Kérékou (1933–2015)	1 March 1990	4 April 1991	1 year, 34 days	PRPB (Note: Succeeded by the Union of Forces of Progress (UFP) at its dissolution on 30 April 1990.)	–	Kérékou II
(6)		Mathieu Kérékou (1933–2015)	1 March 1990	4 April 1991	1 year, 34 days	Independent	–	Kérékou II
7		Nicéphore Soglo (born 1934)	4 April 1991	4 April 1996	5 years	Independent (Note: Supported by the Union for the Triumph of Democratic Renewal (UTDR) and the Benin Rebirth Party (RB).)	1991	Soglo
(6)		Mathieu Kérékou (1933–2015)	4 April 1996	6 April 2006	10 years, 2 days	FARD–Alafia	1996	Kérékou III
(6)		Mathieu Kérékou (1933–2015)	4 April 1996	6 April 2006	10 years, 2 days	FARD–Alafia	2001	Kérékou IV
8		Thomas Boni Yayi (born 1951)	6 April 2006	6 April 2016	10 years	Independent (Note: Supported by the Cowry Forces for an Emerging Benin (FCBE).)	2006	Yayi I
8		Thomas Boni Yayi (born 1951)	6 April 2006	6 April 2016	10 years	Independent	–	Yayi II
8		Thomas Boni Yayi (born 1951)	6 April 2006	6 April 2016	10 years	Independent	–	Yayi III
8		Thomas Boni Yayi (born 1951)	6 April 2006	6 April 2016	10 years	Independent	–	Yayi IV
8		Thomas Boni Yayi (born 1951)	6 April 2006	6 April 2016	10 years	Independent	–	Yayi V
8		Thomas Boni Yayi (born 1951)	6 April 2006	6 April 2016	10 years	Independent	–	Yayi VI
8		Thomas Boni Yayi (born 1951)	6 April 2006	6 April 2016	10 years	Independent	2011	Yayi VII
8		Thomas Boni Yayi (born 1951)	6 April 2006	6 April 2016	10 years	Independent	–	Yayi VIII
8		Thomas Boni Yayi (born 1951)	6 April 2006	6 April 2016	10 years	Independent	–	Yayi IX
8		Thomas Boni Yayi (born 1951)	6 April 2006	6 April 2016	10 years	Independent	–	Yayi X
9		Patrice Talon (born 1958)	6 April 2016	24 May 2026	10 years, 48 days	Independent (Note: Supported by the Progressive Union Renewal (UPR) and the Republican Bloc (BR).)	2016	Talon I
9		Patrice Talon (born 1958)	6 April 2016	24 May 2026	10 years, 48 days	Independent	2021	Talon II
10		Romuald Wadagni (born 1976)	24 May 2026	Incumbent	83 days	Independent	2026	Wadagni

== See also ==
- President of Benin
- Vice President of Benin
- List of prime ministers of Benin
- List of colonial governors of Dahomey
- Politics of Benin
