= 1972 Dahomeyan coup d'état =

Military overthrow of the Presidential Council by Mathieu Kérékou

- Part of the Cold War
Date	26 October 1972
Location	Porto-Novo, Republic of Dahomey 6°29′50″N 2°36′18″E
Result	Coup attempt successful with minimum disruption: Presidential Council removed from power; Major Mathieu Kérékou assumes control, reorganizes the government and renames the country the People's Republic of Benin

Belligerents
Government of the Republic of Dahomey; Presidential Council	Army faction; Ouidah garrison

Commanders and leaders
Hubert Maga; Justin Ahomadégbé-Tomêtin; Sourou-Migan Apithy	Mathieu Kérékou; Janvier Assogba; Michel Aïkpé; Michel Alladayè

Casualties and losses
- No casualties reported.
- Nexus of coup in Porto-Novo (marked green), Republic of Dahomey

The 1972 Dahomeyan coup d'état was a military coup staged on 26 October 1972 by Major (later General) Mathieu Kérékou, who took control of the Republic of Dahomey and ended a system of government established following the annulled 1970 presidential election, in which three members of the Presidential Council (Hubert Maga, Justin Ahomadégbé-Tomêtin and Sourou-Migan Apithy) were to rotate in power. Ahomadégbé-Tomêtin served as the Chairman at the time of the coup.

== The coup ==
The coup was launched by soldiers of the Ouidah garrison and occurred during a Presidential Council meeting between Maga and Ahomadégbé-Tomêtin. (Note: Apithy was in Paris on a political trip.) According to reports at the scene, soldiers abruptly arrived in the Cabinet room of the Presidential Palace in the capital Porto-Novo and started firing bullets, but no one was injured. Kérékou led the first armed company of soldiers to break into the meeting, where he declared the end of the Presidential Council. Kérékou announced the coup on national radio (which later become ORTB) by saying that the "three headed figure [was] truly a monster" beset by "congenital deficiency...notorious inefficiency and...unpardonable incompetence." Similarly to the 1963 coup d'état led by Christophe Soglo, the coup was viewed favorably by much of the population of the country. Kerekou named himself the new head of state, appointing military officers to the various ministerial posts.

== Aftermath ==
The members of the Presidential Council and other prominent political figures were arrested and imprisoned or placed under house arrest until 1981. After they were released from house arrest in 1981, Maga, Ahomadégbé-Tomêtin, and Apithy all moved to Paris.

=== Ideological changes ===
Kérékou proclaimed the formal accession of his government to Marxism–Leninism on 30 November 1974, in a speech before an assembly of stunned notables in the city of Abomey. He soon aligned Dahomey with the Soviet Union and the Eastern Bloc. Finally, Kérékou declared the end of the Republic of Dahomey and the establishment of the People's Republic of Benin on 30 November 1975, named after the Kingdom of Benin that had once flourished in the south-central part of neighboring Nigeria. The People's Revolutionary Party of Benin (PRPB), designed as a vanguard party, was created on the same day as the country's only legal party.

== Bibliography ==
- Decalo, Samuel (April 1973), "Regionalism, Politics, and the Military in Dahomey", The Journal of Developing Areas, 7 (3), College of Business, Tennessee State University: 449–478, JSTOR 4190033.
- Ronen, Dov (1975). Dahomey: Between Tradition and Modernity. Ithaca: Cornell University Press.
- Houngnikpo, Mathurin C. (2001). Determinants of democratization in Africa: a comparative study of Benin and Togo. University Press of America.
- Lea, Chris (2001). Political Chronology of Africa. Routledge. p. 40. ISBN 978-1-135-35666-8.
- Le Vine, Victor T. (1997). "The Fall and Rise of Constitutionalism in West Africa". Journal of Modern African Studies. 35 (2): 181–206. doi:10.1017/s0022278x97002395. S2CID 153723378.
