= United Nations Security Council Resolution 404 =

UN Security Council Resolution 404
- Benin
- Date: 8 February 1977
- Meeting no.: 1,987
- Code: S/RES/404 (Document)
- Subject: The situation in Benin
- Result: Adopted

Security Council composition
- Permanent members: China; France; Soviet Union; United Kingdom; United States
- Non-permanent members: Benin; Canada; India; Libya; Mauritius; Pakistan; Panama; Romania; Venezuela; West Germany

United Nations Security Council Resolution 404, adopted on February 8, 1977, after hearing from a representative of Benin, the Council reaffirmed that States must refrain from threats and use of force in their international relations and decided to establish a Special Mission composed of three members of the Council to investigate the events of January 16, 1977 against the country. The findings of the report by the Special Mission were examined in Resolution 405.

The incident was brought to the attention of the Council by the People's Republic of Benin on January 26, 1977, after foreign mercenaries attacked the airport and the city of Cotonou but were later forced to retreat.

No details of the vote were given, other than that it was adopted "by consensus".

== See also ==
- List of United Nations Security Council Resolutions 401 to 500 (1976–1982)
- United Nations Security Council Resolution 419
