= 1968 presidential election =

1968 presidential election may refer to:

- 1968 Cypriot presidential election
- May 1968 Dahomeyan presidential election
- July 1968 Dahomeyan presidential election
- 1968 Finnish presidential election
- 1968 Icelandic presidential election
- 1968 Israeli presidential election
- 1968 Maldivian presidential election
- 1968 United States presidential election
- 1968 Venezuelan presidential election
