= Alphonse Alley =

Beninese army officer and politician (1930–1987)

Alphonse Amadou Alley
- President Alley

Chairman of the Revolutionary Committee and Provisional President of the Provisional Government
- In office December 21, 1967 – July 17, 1968
- Preceded by: Maurice Kouandété
- Succeeded by: Émile Derlin Zinsou

Personal details
- Born: April 9, 1930 Bassila, Dahomey
- Died: March 28, 1987 (aged 56) Cotonou, Benin
- Occupation: Military officer

Alphonse Amadou Alley (April 9, 1930 – March 28, 1987) was a Beninese army officer and political figure. He was most active when his country was known as Dahomey. He was born in Bassila, central Dahomey, and enrolled in schools in Togo, Côte d'Ivoire, and Senegal before enlisting in the French army in 1950. He saw combat in Indochina from 1950 to 1953, in Morocco from 1955 to 1956, and in Algeria from 1959 to 1961. After the coup in 1965, President Christophe Soglo promoted Alley Chief of Staff of the Army. Young army officer Maurice Kouandété was appointed Alley's chef de cabinet in 1967.

Kouandété launched another coup against Soglo on December 17, but he was forced to hand power to Alley two days later. His administration oversaw the creation of a new constitution and a presidential election, Dahomey's first since 1964. The results were annulled because of a boycott that prevented almost three-quarters of the country from voting. Alley lost popularity with the suggestion that the military should retreat back to the barracks, and was eventually reduced to a mouthpiece for Kouandété. On July 17, 1968, Alley was forced to hand power to Emile Zinsou, a veteran politician.

Alley's retirement was marked by a series of discharges from the military, trials, and prison sentences. At one trial, Zinsou's conduct sparked another coup led by Kouandété. On October 26, 1972, Mathieu Kérékou seized power in a coup. He ended Alley's military career, as well as that of every other senior officer, and named Alley commissioner of the National Oil Wells (SNADAH), a role with very little responsibility. Kérékou accused Alley of plotting against him on February 28, 1973, and sentenced the latter to 20 years in prison. He died on March 28, 1987.

== Military background ==
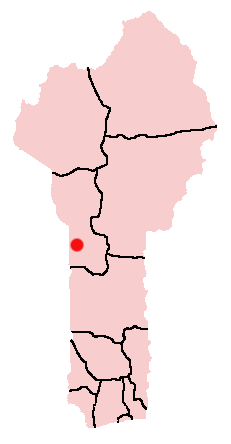
Location of Bassila in Dahomey

Location of Dahomey in Africa

Alley was born on April 9, 1930, in Bassila, central Dahomey. He was a member of the small Widji ethnic group, based in the north. His father was also a military commander, who served the French in Syria during 1942 and helped train police in Togo. Alphonse enrolled in schools in Togo, Côte d'Ivoire, and Senegal until he enlisted in the French army in 1950. His first combat operation later that year was at the Indochinese Peninsula for the First Indochina War. Alley withdrew in late 1953, shortly before Operation Castor was launched at Dien Bien Phu. After this wartime experience, he went the Saint Maxient Non-Commissioned Officer School in France (now the National Active Non-Commissioned Officers School (France) or École Nationale des Sous-Officiers d’Actives (ENSOA)). He saw combat in Morocco from 1955 to 1956 and in Algeria from 1959 to 1961, where he became a paratrooper.

After Dahomey gained independence in 1960, Alley travelled back to his homeland and led a paratrooper unit. At first, he was a lieutenant, but he was promoted to captain in 1962 and major in 1964. Later that year he led several soldiers to the Dahomey-Niger border during a border dispute. Historian Samuel Decalo described Alley as "a jovial, dashing, easygoing and well-liked figure" and was known by diplomats as "the wine, women and song officer".

In Dahomeyan coups in 1963 and 1965, Alley urged General Christophe Soglo to seize power. After the 1965 coup, Soglo promoted Alley Chief of Staff of the Army. Alley made known his disagreements with Soglo on several occasions, though he remained loyal nonetheless. Young army officer Maurice Kouandété was appointed Alley's chef de cabinet in 1967 and his frequent opposition to Alley during staff meetings helped to create factions in the Dahomeyan Army.

== 1967 coup d'état ==
Kouandété had aspirations of his own. On December 17, 1967, he and 60 other soldiers led a military coup and toppled Soglo. Kouandété seized the presidency, though he was unsure what to do with it. Members of his faction urged the new president to remain at his post, though the general public's opinion was against him. Meanwhile, France refused to aid Dahomey and would not recognise Kouandété. He was forced to appointed Alley provisional president two days later, although Kouandété had placed Alley under house arrest and accused him of "shirking [his] duties" and maintained a "policy of appeasement." Kouandété served as prime minister thereafter.

== President of Dahomey ==
Alley was one of the few figures who were trusted by northern and southern Dahomeyans alike. His role was only temporary, until power was to be ceded back to civilians in six months time. Among the events on the official timetable, which the military published on January 17, 1968, was the creation of a nonmilitary Constitution Commission on January 31, which would write a new Dahomeyan constitution. The document granted Alley strong executive power, and was adopted by the Comite Militaire Revolutionaire, Alley's interim government comprisising only military officers, in early March. A national referendum on the constitution was held on March 31, which passed with 92 percent in favor.

The Comite decided to ban all former presidents, vice presidents, government ministers, and National Assembly presidents from the upcoming presidential election. This was to prevent Dahomeyan politics from repeating its practices of old. The Supreme Court ruled the proscription was unconstitutional, although Alley overruled the decision. He instead only recognised five candidates as legitimate.

In response to their disqualification, former presidents Hubert Maga and Sourou-Migan Apithy staged protests while Justin Ahomadégbé-Tomêtin, another ex-president, supported an obscure candidate named Basile Adjou Moumouni. The election was held on May 15, and was Dahomey's first since 1964. Moumouni won the election with 80 percent of the vote, but Alley declared the result void because the protest prevented nearly three-quarters of the electorate from voting. This result sparked further demonstrations, and Maga, Apithy, Ahomadégbé-Tomêtin, and former president Christophe Soglo were forbidden to enter the country, in an attempt to crack down on dissent. Alley felt he had made a mistake in disqualifying Maga, Apithy, and Ahomadégbé-Tomêtin, as he believed that only they could bring unity to Dahomey.

In a radio address on May 11, Alley announced that due to the nullification, the military would heve to stay in power beyond June 17. He noted that his administration would require extra time to find a successor who was backed by everyone. Alley suggested that the military should retreat back to the barracks at Camp Ghezo and leave Dahomeyan politics to the career politicians. The view was unpopular, and he was outvoted by his military comrades. Alley eventually became little more than Kouandété's mouthpiece.

Alley attempted to remove Kouandété from the army, though to no avail. In any case, by June his fellow officers had made up their mind as to the next president. After talks with unionists, civil servants, and academics, they "entrust[ed] the reins of power to Émile Derlin Zinsou for at least five years", who was "charged to form a government of national union", as per a June 28 newspaper article by the state press. On July 17, Alley handed power to Zinsou, a veteran politician.

== Later life ==
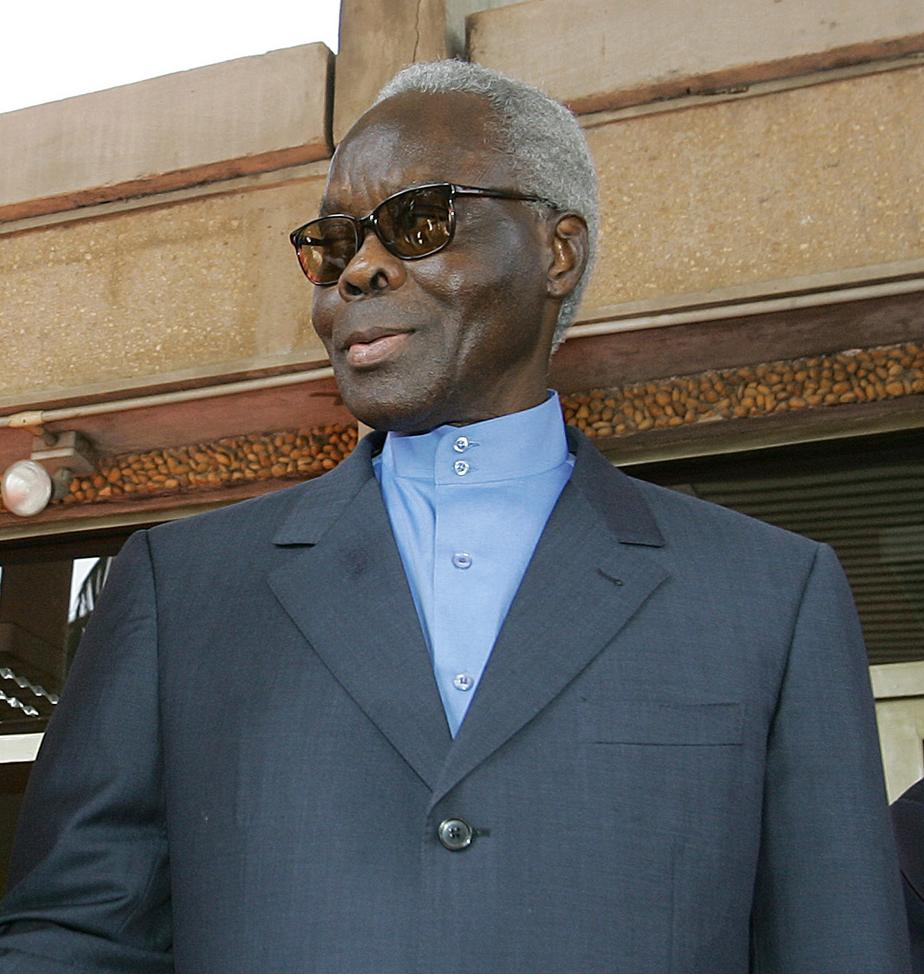
Mathieu Kérékou in 2006

After Alley was retired from the presidency, he was purged from combat in the army and was assigned the new post of military attaché in Washington, D.C, an appointment he refused to accept. General Etienne Eyadema, the president of neighboring Togo, thought that this "serve[d Alley] right, for being stupid enough to give power back to the politicians. Don't think I'm ever going to be that dumb." Alley was discharged from the armed forces altogether in September, with Kouandété taking his place as Chief of Staff.

On July 11, 1969, Kouandété accused Alley of plotting to kidnap and murder him. Facing the death penalty, Alley was sentenced to ten years of hard labor at an open trial held on October 4. Zinsou had intervened for Alley, and it strained relations between the president and Kouandété. The latter decided to lead another coup on December 10. In the aftermath, Alley was released from incarceration and reinstated in the army. In July 1968, he was named Secretary General of National Defence. Kouandété ended up becoming Alley's adjutant.

In 1971, Alley allowed Togolese refugee Noe Kutuklui protection in Dahomey, despite official government policy to the contrary. On October 26, 1972, Mathieu Kérékou seized power in a coup. He ended Alley's military career, as well as that of every other senior officer, and named him commissioner of the National Oil Wells (SNADAH), a role with very little responsibility. Kérékou accused Alley of plotting against him on February 28, 1973, and sentenced him to 20 years in prison. He was released on amnesty on August 1, 1984, as well as all other political detainees besides those involved in the "ignoble and barbarous imperialist armed aggression of Sunday, January 17, 1977," as the official press release states.

Alley died on March 28, 1987. He was survived by his son, Zacharie. Plans for a mausoleum are in the works, decades after his death.

== Bibliography ==
- Daggs, Elisa (1970), All Africa: All Its Political Entities of Independent or Other Status, Metuchen, New Jersey: Hastings House, ISBN 0-8038-0336-2, OCLC 1959674
- Decalo, Samuel (April 1973), "Regionalism, Politics, and the Military in Dahomey", The Journal of Developing Areas, 7 (3), College of Business, Tennessee State University: 449–478, JSTOR 4190033
- Decalo, Samuel (1976), Historical Dictionary of Dahomey (People's Republic of Benin), Metuchen, New Jersey: Scarecrow Press, ISBN 0-8108-0833-1, OCLC 82503
- Ronen, Dov (1975), Dahomey: Between Tradition and Modernity, Ithaca, New York: Cornell University Press, ISBN 0-8014-0927-6, OCLC 1527290
