= 1968 Dahomeyan presidential election =

The 1968 Dahomeyan presidential election may refer to:

- May 1968 Dahomeyan presidential election, a presidential election held on 5 May
- July 1968 Dahomeyan presidential election, a presidential election held on 28 July

== See also ==
- Elections in Benin
