= Paul-Émile de Souza =

Beninese military officer and politician

- President Paul-Émile de Souza

Chairman of the Directory of Dahomey
- In office December 13, 1969 – May 7, 1970
- Preceded by: Maurice Kouandété
- Succeeded by: Hubert Maga

Personal details
- Born: July 14, 1930 Bohicon, Dahomey
- Died: June 17, 1999 (aged 68) Cotonou, Benin
- Spouse: Françoise De Souza
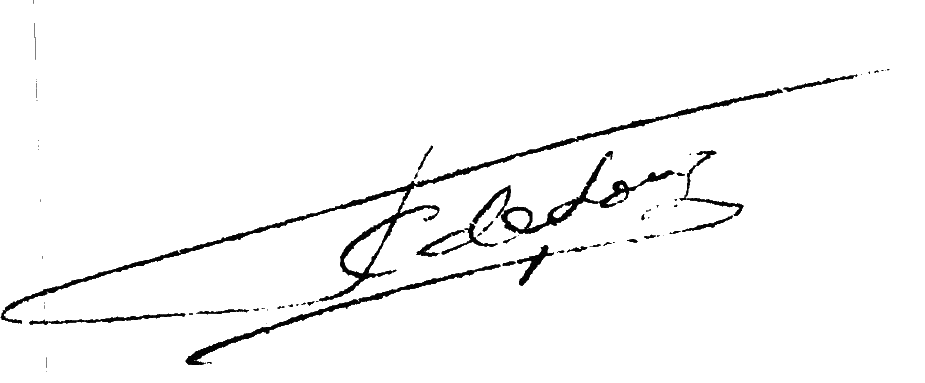
- Signature

Paul-Émile de Souza (July 14, 1930 – June 17, 1999) was a Beninese army officer and political figure. He was chairman of the Directory of Dahomey from December 13, 1969, to May 7, 1970.

== Birth and family ==
Paul-Emile de Souza was born into the aristocratic De Souza family on July 14, 1930. His birthplace was Athiémè, Dahomey. His wife was Françoise De Souza.

== Military career ==
In 1966, de Souza was selected as vice president of the Comité de Rénovation Nationale, as well as being one of the three officers on the Comité. It had very few functions other than to advise Christophe Soglo and was abolished on April 6, 1967. When Soglo was overthrown later that year, de Souza was chosen as Emile Derlin Zinsou's Director of Military Affairs. For the most part de Souza tried to stay out of politics if he could and led the parachutist unit at Ouidah.

== Chairmanship ==
On December 10, 1969, Émile Derlin Zinsou was overthrown by Maurice Kouandété, though the military did not recognize the latter. de Souza was briefly put under house arrest in the aftermath. Since the two men could not end their quarrels, a Military Directorate was established with de Souza as its chairman, Kouandete a member, and Col. Benoit Sinzogan of the Gendarmie occupying the third seat. An election was held on March 28, 1970, to determine the true president. It was marked by a series of violent outbursts; unvalidated reports state that six people were killed were wounded at incidents in Parakou on the eve of the elections. Former presidents Hubert Maga, Sourou-Migan Apithy, and Justin Ahomadégbé-Tomêtin received a majority of the vote in the north, southeast, and southwest/central, respectively.

de Souza decided to nullify the results from Atakora, the region where Maga received the most votes. Outraged, Maga threatened to secede unless he was declared President. Apithy stated that he would convince his region to join Nigeria if Maga took the presidency. The three former Presidents agreed to a hasty compromise to prevent a civil war. A presidential council, comprising Maga, Ahomadégbé-Tomêtin, and Apithy, with a presidency that changed every two years, was set up on May 7. Maga inaugurated this system for the first two years, before passing the power, on May 7, 1972, to Ahomadégbé-Tomêtin.

== Later life ==
Colonel Paul-Émile De Souza returned to his role as Chief of Staff of the Dahomeyan Army.

Kouandété attempted to usurp to power again on February 23, 1972. Leading the Ouidah garrison, he also attempted to take over government buildings and murder de Souza. Over the course of the operation, assailant Major Moumouni was mortally wounded by de Souza's bullets. de Souza, meanwhile, escaped with only a slight injury. The plot was foiled, although Maga cancelled a visit to France to attend the matter at hand. Kouandété received the death penalty for his role in the attack.

When Mathieu Kérékou seized power in October 1972, de Souza was dismissed from the army. He was appointed commissioner of the national Agricultural Credit Bank (SOCAD).

Paul-Émile de Souza died on June 17, 1999, aged 68. His widow, former First Lady of Dahomey Françoise De Souza, died on July 30, 2015.

== Bibliography ==
- Decalo, Samuel (1976), Historical Dictionary of Dahomey (People's Republic of Benin), Metuchen, New Jersey: Scarecrow Press, ISBN 0-8108-0833-1, OCLC 1959674
- Hudgens, Jim; Trillo, Richard; Calonnec, Nathalie (2003), The Rough Guide to West Africa, London: Rough Guides, ISBN 1-84353-118-6, OCLC 176832097.
- Kneib, Martha (2007), Benin, Cultures of the World, Tarrytown, New York: Marshall Cavendish, ISBN 978-0-7614-2328-7, OCLC 62109915.
- Ronen, Dov (1975), Dahomey: Between Tradition and Modernity, Ithaca, New York: Cornell University Press, ISBN 0-8014-0927-6, OCLC 1527290.
