= United Nations Security Council Resolution 405 =

UN Security Council Resolution 405
- Benin
- Date: 14 April 1977
- Meeting no.: 2,005
- Code: S/RES/405 (Document)
- Subject: The situation in Benin
- Result: Adopted

Security Council composition
- Permanent members: China; France; Soviet Union; United Kingdom; United States
- Non-permanent members: Benin; Canada; India; Libya; Mauritius; Pakistan; Panama; Romania; Venezuela; West Germany

United Nations Security Council Resolution 405, adopted on April 14, 1977, after considering the report delivered by the Special Mission established in Resolution 404 for Benin, the Council strongly condemned the attack by mercenaries in the country on January 16, 1977. It recalled Resolution 239 (1965) condemning any State which hires mercenaries to attack another and interfering in its internal affairs. The council also warned against any State's attempt to destabilise another.

The resolution goes on to thank the Special Mission for its work and requests material assistance for Benin by Member States to help repair damage sustained during the attack.

No details were of the voting were given, other than that it was adopted "by consensus".

== See also ==
- List of United Nations Security Council Resolutions 401 to 500 (1976–1982)
- United Nations Security Council Resolution 419
