= Badarou =

Badarou is a Beninese surname. Notable people with the surname include:

- Daouda Badarou (born 1929), Beninese politician
- Wally Badarou (born 1955), French musician
