= United Nations Security Council Resolution 393 =

UN Security Council Resolution 393
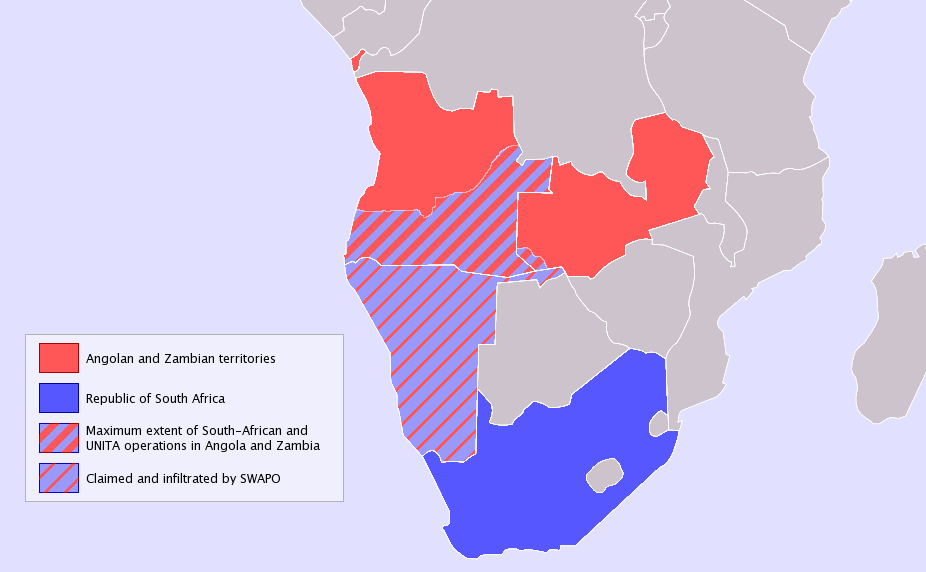
- South Africa Border Wars in Angola and Zambia
- Date: 30 July 1976
- Meeting no.: 1,948
- Code: S/RES/393 (Document)
- Subject: South Africa-Zambia
- Voting summary: 14 voted for; None voted against; 1 abstained
- Result: Adopted

Security Council composition
- Permanent members: China; France; Soviet Union; United Kingdom; United States
- Non-permanent members: Benin; Guyana; Italy; Japan; Libya; Pakistan; Panama; Romania; Sweden; Tanzania

United Nations Security Council Resolution 393, adopted on July 30, 1976, after a letter from a representative from Zambia, the Council condemned a recent attack by South Africa in Zambian territory, resulting in the destruction of property and loss of life. The resolution went on to express concern at South Africa's occupation and use of South West Africa as a base for attacking neighbouring African countries, and that the continuation of this would constitute a threat to international peace and security.

The Council concluded the attack was a violation of Zambia's territorial integrity, independence and sovereignty. It reiterated its support for the Namibian people and countries who supported their cause, as well as the removal of apartheid which would be "necessary for the attainment of justice and lasting peace in the region." The resolution also declared that if further attacks continue, it would decide on appropriate measures to respond with in accordance with the Charter of the United Nations.

The resolution, also supported by Zaire, was adopted by 14 votes to none; with one abstention from the United States.

In the days before the meeting, Zambia condemned South Africa for carrying out attacks in its territory which resulted in 24 deaths and 45 injuries. It also charged South Africa with shelling a village near the border with Angola and South West Africa and along the Zambezi. South Africa denied the allegations, saying it would "at no time authorize and would not authorize attacks on Zambian villages." It also criticised the Security Council for passing condemnations without engaging with the country, "We need communication. We do not need exacerbation" according to South African representative Pik Botha.

== See also ==
- United Nations Resolution 393
- List of United Nations Security Council Resolutions 301 to 400 (1971–1976)
- Namibian War of Independence
- South African Border War
- South Africa under apartheid
- United Nations Security Council Resolution 300
