= 1970 Dahomeyan presidential election =

Election of Justin Ahomadégbé

- 9–28 March 1970
- Registered: 997,226
- Turnout: 56.69%
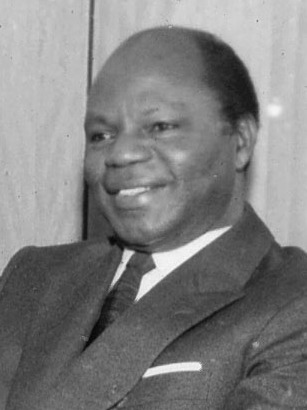

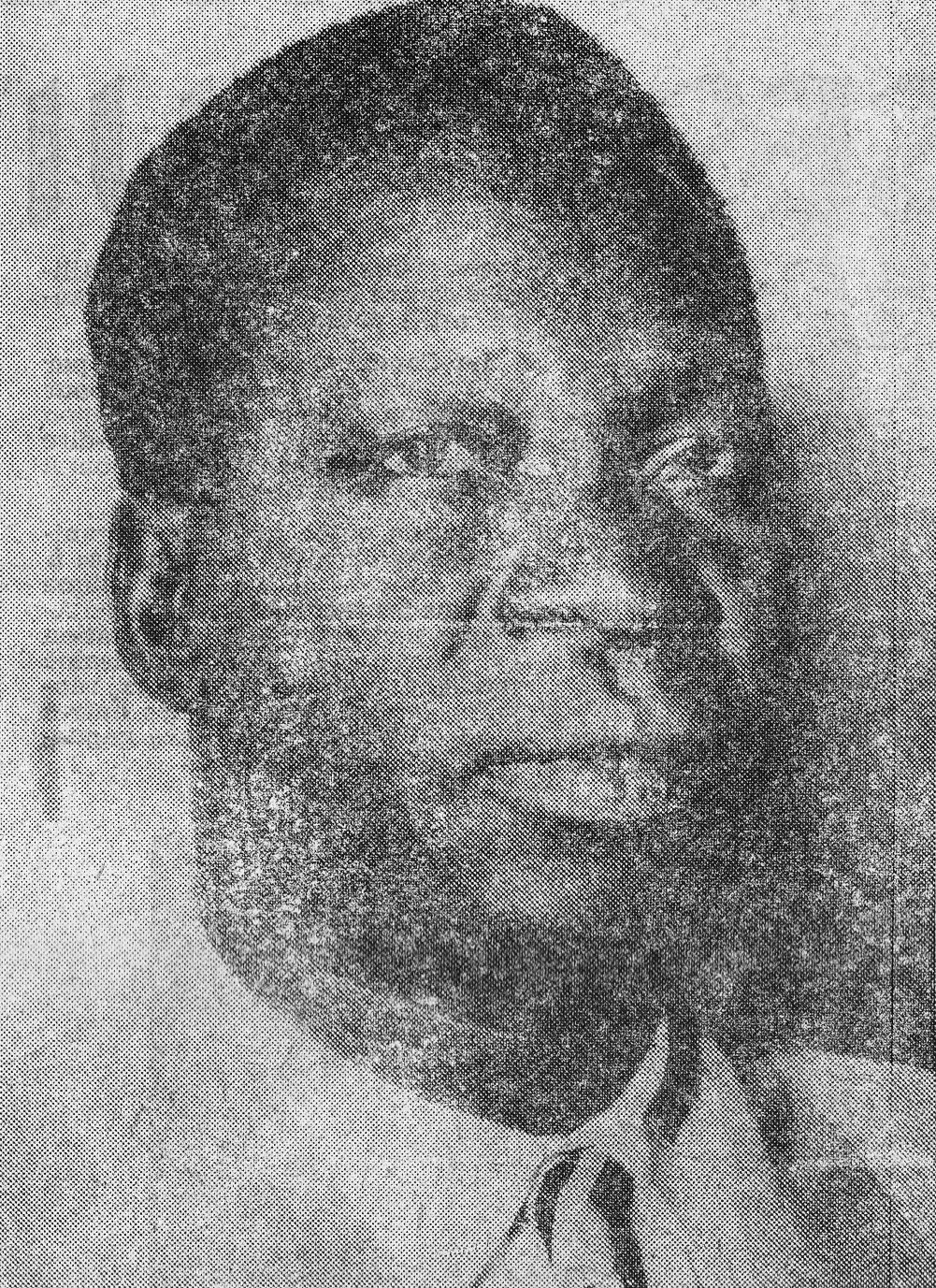

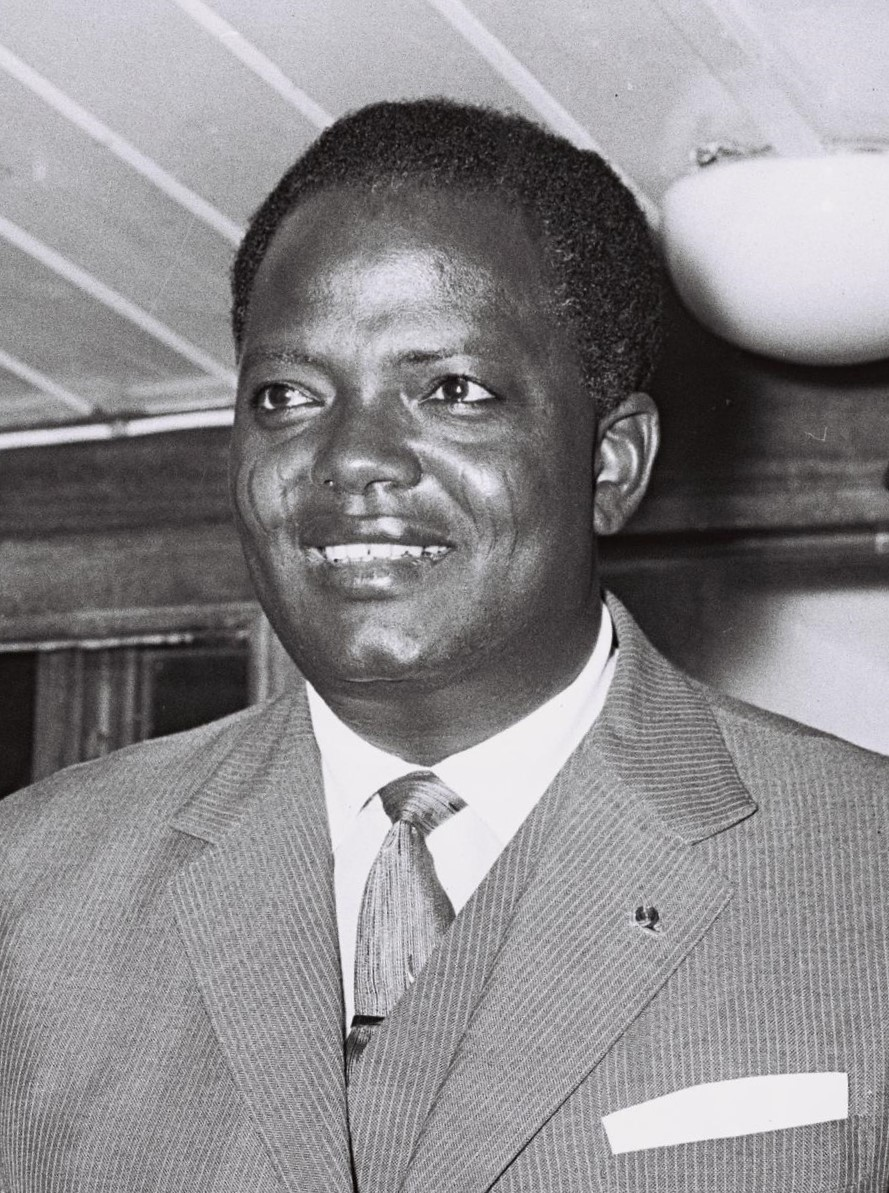
Candidate	Justin Ahomadégbé	Sourou-Migan Apithy	Hubert Maga
Popular vote	200,092	176,828	152,551
Percentage	36.57%	32.32%	27.88%
President before election
Paul-Émile de Souza
Elected President
Election annulled

Presidential elections were held in Dahomey from 9 March to 28 March 1970. Voting took place "in one province at a time" in Dahomey's six departments. However, on 28 March, the ruling military council suspended further voting because of violence between supporters of the three main candidates. At the time the voting was halted, Justin Ahomadégbé-Tomêtin of Dahomey's had received a plurality of the vote, but disagreements between factions in other parts of the country led to the results being annulled. The compromise announced by the military junta on 1 May was to appoint the three leading candidates – former Presidents Sourou-Migan Apithy and Hubert Maga, and former Prime Minister Ahomadégbé-Tomêtin – to a three-man Presidential Council to rule the country, rotating the presidency every two years, effectively declaring all three men as the election winners. Maga served the first two-year term, before handing over to Ahomadégbé in 1972, who was then removed from office by a coup led by Mathieu Kérékou later in the year. Voter turnout in the election was 56.7%.

Legislative elections to elect an assembly of 42 deputies are also organized from March 11 to 31 as provided for by the ordinance of February 9, 1970. They were also canceled before the results were announced.

== Background ==
On 10 December 1969 President Émile Derlin Zinsou was overthrown by Maurice Kouandété, who had installed him as president in 1968. However, the military refused to recognise Kouandété. As the two men could not reach agreement, a Military Directorate was established with Paul-Émile de Souza as its chairman. Elections were organised to determine the true president.

== Campaign ==
The three candidates were allowed to campaign, and they did not miss the chance. Intimidation and bribery were commonplace, and the electoral campaign saw the return of regional loyalties. It was also marked by a series of violent outbursts; invalidated reports state that six people were killed or wounded at incidents in Parakou on the eve of the elections. Fellow candidate Zinsou asserted that Maga supporters had killed one of his supporters during said incidents.

== Results ==
The accusations made against him did not affect Maga's standing in the polls; he received a majority of the vote in the north, and Apithy and Ahomadégbé-Tomêtin received a majority in the southeast and southwest/central, respectively. The election results showed a victory for Maga with 252,551 votes, 200,091 for Ahomadégbé-Tomêtin, and 186,332 for Apithy. In the entire south, Maga received 24,000 votes compared to the 180,000 who voted for him in the Borgou Department, obtaining 97.3 percent of the 78 percent turnout. Zinsou, running to counter the constant tribal clashes, received 3 percent, with 17,551 votes.

Candidate	Votes	%
Justin Ahomadégbé-Tomêtin	200,092	36.57
Sourou-Migan Apithy	176,828	32.32
Hubert Maga	152,551	27.88
Emile Derlin Zinsou	17,653	3.23
Total	547,124	100.00
Valid votes	547,124	96.78
Invalid/blank votes	18,223	3.22
Total votes	565,347	100.00
Registered voters/turnout	997,226	56.69
Source: Nohlen et al.

== Aftermath ==
Following the election, de Souza decided to nullify the results from Atakora, the region where Maga received the most votes, on 3 April. Outraged, Maga formed the Assembly of the Peoples of the North, which threatened to secede unless he was declared President. He refused to leave his campaign headquarters at Parakou even to attend political meetings. Maga's reaction to the nullification prompted many southern workers to flee the north. Apithy stated that he would convince his region to join Nigeria if Maga took the presidency and took steps to bribe his way into that office. Ahomadégbé-Tomêtin claimed Maga had defrauded the electoral system to his advantage. In contrast with the other three former presidents, Zinsou admitted that he had been defeated and decided participate in bargaining, explaining that he rejected the idea of a coalition "for personal reasons". The other former Presidents, on the other hand, agreed to a hasty compromise on 13 April to prevent a civil war.

== Bibliography ==
- Decalo, Samuel (April 1973), "Regionalism, Politics, and the Military in Dahomey", The Journal of Developing Areas, 7 (3), College of Business, Tennessee State University: 449–478, JSTOR 4190033.
- Dossou-Yovo, Noel (September 1999), "The Experience of Benin", International Journal on World Peace, 16 (3), ISSN 0742-3640, OCLC 211426384, archived from the original on 2010-09-16 – via Questia.
- Hudgens, Jim; Trillo, Richard; Calonnec, Nathalie (2003), The Rough Guide to West Africa, London: Rough Guides, ISBN 1-84353-118-6, OCLC 176832097.
- Kneib, Martha (2007), Benin, Cultures of the World, Tarrytown, New York: Marshall Cavendish, ISBN 978-0-7614-2328-7, OCLC 62109915.
- Ronen, Dov (1975), Dahomey: Between Tradition and Modernity, Ithaca, New York: Cornell University Press, ISBN 0-8014-0927-6, OCLC 1527290.
