= June 1946 French legislative election in Dahomey and Togo =

Elections to the French National Assembly were held in French Dahomey and French Togoland on 2 June 1946. The territory elected two seats to the Assembly via two electoral colleges. Pierre Bertho of the Popular Republican Movement was elected from the first college and Sourou-Migan Apithy in the second.

== Results ==
=== First College ===
| Candidate | Party | Votes | % |
|---|---|---|---|
| Pierre Bertho | Popular Republican Movement | 575 | 100.00 |
| Total | | 575 | 100.00 |
| Valid votes | | 575 | 69.03 |
| Invalid/blank votes | | 258 | 30.97 |
| Total votes | | 833 | 100.00 |
| Registered voters/turnout | | 1,577 | 52.82 |
Source: Sternberger et al.

=== Second College ===
| Candidate | Votes | % |
|---|---|---|
| Sourou-Migan Apithy | 8,096 | 99.82 |
| Paulin Norward | 15 | 0.18 |
| Total | 8,111 | 100.00 |
| Valid votes | 8,111 | 89.44 |
| Invalid/blank votes | 958 | 10.56 |
| Total votes | 9,069 | 100.00 |
| Registered voters/turnout | 11,962 | 75.82 |
Source: Sternberger et al.
