= United Nations Security Council Resolution 419 =

UN Security Council Resolution 419
- Benin
- Date: 24 November 1977
- Meeting no.: 2,049
- Code: S/RES/419 (Document)
- Subject: The situation in Benin
- Result: Adopted

Security Council composition
- Permanent members: China; France; Soviet Union; United Kingdom; United States
- Non-permanent members: Benin; Canada; India; Libya; Mauritius; Pakistan; Panama; Romania; Venezuela; West Germany

United Nations Security Council Resolution 419, adopted on November 24, 1977, after hearing from a representative of the People's Republic of Benin, the Council reaffirmed Resolution 405 (1977) and asked Member States for cooperation on investigating the mercenaries who attacked Benin earlier in the year.

The Council noted Benin's desire to have the mercenaries subjected to the law and the requirement of assistance from Member States in repairing the damage. Finally, the resolution required the Secretary-General continue to monitor the implementation of the resolution.

The resolution was adopted without a vote.

== See also ==
- List of United Nations Security Council Resolutions 401 to 500 (1976–1982)
