= May 1968 Dahomeyan presidential election =

Presidential elections were held in Dahomey on 5 May 1968. Former presidents, vice-presidents, ministers, and presidents of the National Assembly were banned. The main former leaders and leaders of the 1950s, Hubert Maga, Sourou Migan Apithy, and Justin Ahomadégbé, were therefore banned. Basile Adjou won with 84% of the vote, but the results were invalidated due to insufficient voter turnout (turnout was just 26%).

The military government appointed doctor Émile Derlin Zinsou on July 17, 1968, on the condition that he be accepted by a referendum. A referendum on 28 July resulted in Émile Derlin Zinsou being confirmed as president.

== Results ==
Candidate	Votes	%
Basile Adjou	241,273	83.95
Urbain Karim da Silva	19,319	6.72
Eustache Prudencio	11,359	3.95
Paul Hazoumé	11,091	3.86
Jean-Baptiste Vierin	4,350	1.51
Total	287,392	100.00
Valid votes	287,392	97.20
Invalid/blank votes	8,275	2.80
Total votes	295,667	100.00
Registered voters/turnout	1,138,388	25.97
Source: Nohlen et al.
