= Presidential Council (Benin) =

1970–1972 triumvirate government of Dahomey

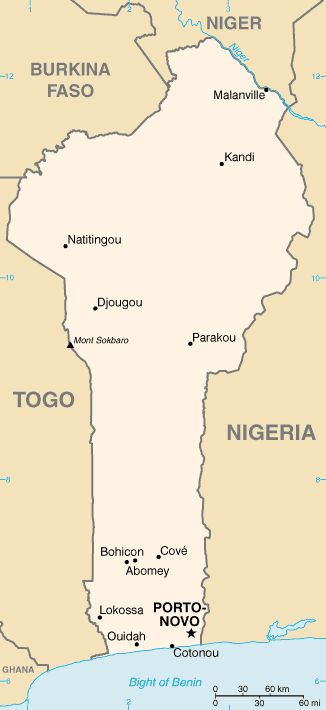
Map of Benin. Benin politics in the early years was largely divided between bases of power in Abomey, Porto-Novo, and Natitingou.

The Presidential Council (French: Conseil Présidentiel) was a triumvirate system of government in the Republic of Dahomey (present-day Benin) from 7 May 1970 until 26 October 1972. The Presidential Council included Hubert Maga (former president from 1960 to 1963), Justin Ahomadégbé-Tomêtin (former prime minister from 1964 to 1965), and Sourou-Migan Apithy (former president from 1964 to 1965) as equal members of a council which held all legislative and executive power in the state of Dahomey.

Following independence from France, the Republic of Dahomey saw a division of the country between different political/ethnic parties with one party representing the northern part of the country, one party representing the former Kingdom of Dahomey in the southwest, and one party representing Porto-Novo in the southeast. The result was a highly unstable system of governance with the leaders of each of these different parties struggling with each other for power. Hubert Maga from the north was deposed in a military coup in 1963 which eventually appointed Apithy from Porto-Novo and Ahomadégbé from the former kingdom of Dahomey as the divided rulers of the country. Ahomadégbé was eventually able to gain the support of Maga to gain the upper hand over Apithy and become the leader in the country only to be deposed two days later by the military. Five years of political instability, including multiple other military coups and a failed election eventually resulted in the 1970 Presidential election which largely divided the country and, when there was violence, the military annulled the results. In the political crisis that resulted, the military was able to get the three main candidates, Maga, Ahomadégbé, and Apithy to agree to form a Presidential Council with all three holding all executive and legislative authority.

In the charter of the Presidential Council, each of the three leaders would sit on a Presidential Council which would be tasked with approving all major policy decisions of the country. At the same time, each would get two years as the President of the country able to implement many of the ongoing tasks of managing the military and civil service in the country. The various ministerial positions would be divided between the three leaders; however, the Ministry of the Interior and the Minister of the Army would be appointed by the sitting president. It was decided that Maga would be the first President from 1970 until 1972, followed by Ahomadégbé until 1974, and then Apithy until 1976. One peaceful transition occurred with Hubert Maga giving power to Justin Ahomadégbé-Tomêtin on 7 May 1972. However, stalled politics ensued with Maga and Apithy working to undermine Ahomadégbé's ability to govern and the Presidential Council was ended on 26 October 1972 when a military coup led by Mathieu Kérékou assumed power and ruled the country until 1991.

== Background ==
The colony of French Dahomey was created as a part of French West Africa in 1904. The colony was constructed of two coastal kingdoms with a long history of antagonism with one another (Dahomey and Porto-Novo) with a large area to the north controlled by a variety of mostly Mahi and Bariba peoples.

After World War II, the colonies of French West Africa began a 15-year process towards independence. French Dahomey, like many other colonies, saw domestic political parties emerge in the mid-1950s. However, in contrast to many of the other colonies, political parties in French Dahomey did not become predominant through the whole colony, but largely adhered to the precolonial regions. In the northern part of the country, the Groupement Ethnique du Nord and then the Rassemblement Démocratique du Dahomé led by Hubert Maga were the most dominant party. In the area that was formerly the kingdom of Dahomey, the Union Démocratique du Dahomé led by Justin Ahomadégbé-Tomêtin became the most powerful party. And in Porto-Novo, the Parti des Nationialistes Dahoméens led by Sourou-Migan Apithy was the major party. Although there were some efforts by the various parties to become predominant throughout the colony, the division of the colony into three distinct spheres for the different parties had largely solidified by 1957. Apithy was the major political leader in the colony, being elected twice to the French National Assembly in 1946 and 1951. Maga was also elected in 1951 as the colony's second representative to the National Assembly.

Apithy won the 1958 election in the colony to select the Premier who would guide the country to independence and lead until the first elections.

=== Musical chairs (1960-1965) ===
Executive Leader in Dahomey (1960-1972) (Note: Presidential Council Terms in olive)
before August 1960	Sourou-Migan Apithy, Premier
31 December 1960 to 27 October 1963	Hubert Maga, President
27 October 1963 to 25 January 1964	Christophe Soglo, head of military provisional government
25 January 1964 to 27 November 1965	Sourou-Migan Apithy, head of state Justin Ahomadégbé-Tomêtin, head of government
27 November 1965 to 29 November 1965	Justin Ahomadégbé-Tomêtin, Prime Minister
29 November 1965 to 19 December 1967	Christophe Soglo, head of military provisional government
19 December 1967 to 17 July 1968	Alphonse Alley, head of military provisional government
17 July 1968 to 10 December 1969	Émile Derlin Zinsou, President
10 December 1969 to 13 December 1969	Maurice Kouandété, head of military provisional committee
13 December 1969 to 7 May 1970	Paul-Émile de Souza, head of military directory
7 May 1970 to 7 May 1972	Hubert Maga, President and head of Presidential Council
7 May 1972 to 26 October 1972	Justin Ahomadégbé-Tomêtin, President and head of Presidential Council
after 26 October 1972	Mathieu Kérékou, President

Following independence in 1960, Dahomey had its first elections in December. As a result of Fon ethnic identification with Ahomadégbé and perceived corruption and ineffectiveness of the Apithy administration, Ahomadégbé made large gains in the Porto-Novo region traditionally aligned with Apithy. Apithy responded to this by making a parliamentary alliance with Maga which made Maga the first President of Dahomey and made Apithy the first Minister of Finance and then later the Vice President. To consolidate his power, Maga promoted a number of allies and people from the north through the new positions in the country's civil service. In addition, he tried to weaken his ally's political power by appointing Apithy to be the Ambassador of France while he was still the Vice President. Unfortunately giving political positions and channeling money to the north caused severe budgetary problems in the country which eventually led Maga to freeze wages for public employees leading to a general strike by unionists and students in October 1963. On 28 October, Christophe Soglo, the Army Chief of Staff, removed Maga from power and created a new system of government with Apithy being appointed the head of state and Ahomadégbé the head of government. However, the division between these roles and the responsibilities between the two leaders was not clearly defined. During the 1963 coup, Maga and many of his inner circle were arrested and tried for mismanagement of public funds.

In the new arrangement, Apithy and Ahomadégbéd wrestled constantly with one another for power. Seeing an opportunity to become the primary political power in the government, Ahomadégbé released Maga from prison and the coalition between the two leaders named Ahomadégbé the provisional president of the legislature on 27 November 1965. Soglo grew increasingly concerned with the situation and believed that Ahomadégbé was forming an alliance with Soglo's second in command (Colonel Philippe Aho, who was a Fon like Ahomadégbé). The result was that Soglo suspended the constitution and removed Ahomadégbé from power on 29 November. Following the 1965 coup, Apithy, Ahomadégbé, and Maga all went into exile in France. Soglo ruled for two years until union strikes and dissatisfaction within the ranks of the military led to the 17 December 1967 coup where two junior military officers, Maurice Kouandété and Mathieu Kérékou, overthrew Soglo and sent him into exile in France. Following the removal of Soglo from power, the military decided to transition to a civilian government and appointed Colonel Alphonse Alley, Soglo's chief of staff, as the provisional president until such a transition could occur. A new constitution was prepared and approved in a vote by 92% of the population in March 1968.

In the elections which followed to elect a civilian president, all former presidents, prime ministers, and ministers were prohibited from running. This excluded Apithy, Ahomadégbé, Maga, and former foreign minister Émile Derlin Zinsou from running for the position. Apithy, Ahomadégbé, and Maga declared a general boycott of the election which proved highly successful with only 33% of the eligible voters casting ballots. With such low turnout, the military invalidated the election results and, after consulting with unions and other activists in the country, the military selected Zinsou as the new president.

With the appointment of Zinsou as a civilian leader of the country, Apithy, Ahomadégbé, and Maga tried to return to the country but were informed that their plane would be shot down if they entered Dahomey airspace; they instead flew to neighboring Togo. Zinsou, who had a history of advocacy against the policies of the military, quickly drew the ire of the military leaders by pursuing a host of policies without consultation with them. In addition, to control continued deficits, Zinsou instituted a number of austerity measures and as a result alienated unions and the urban population. The result was that on 10 December 1969, Zinsou was taken into custody by military officers organized by Kouandété and Zinsou was sent to a remote military garrison near Natitingou. Following the coup, Kouandété found that he did not have the support to rule throughout the entire military, and so instead Paul-Emile de Souza (the director of military affairs for Zinsou's government) was named the provisional head of state as the head of a three-person Military directorate (with Kouandété and Colonel Benoît Sinzogan holding the other seats). The military directorate decided to release Zinsou and hold new presidential elections in 1970 without the restrictions of the 1968 elections, thus allowing Apithy, Ahomadégbé, and Maga to run.

=== 1970 Election ===
1970 Election Results (Note: Without votes from Atakora)
Candidate	Number of Votes	Percentage
Ahomadégbé	200,092	36.57%
Apithy	176,828	32.32%
Maga	152,551	27.88%
Zinsou	17,653	3.22%

The 1970 election included all of the civilian leaders of the country since independence with Apithy, Ahomadégbé, Maga, and Zinsou running against one another. The military decided to hold the elections on a staggered schedule with different areas of the country voting on different dates. This staggering meant that each of the candidates strategically tried to gain votes in later voting regions based upon the earlier results: bribery and irregularities in the election were rampant. Just before voting began in Atakora, the last department to vote which was a stronghold for Maga, Ahomadégbé supporters instigated violence to undercut turnout. Maga would have won the presidency if he had earned the most votes in Atakora, but instead of allowing the vote to go forward, de Souza suspended the election and immediately called on all sides to come to an agreement forming the next government.

The situation became quite tense with each of the sides making threats and refusing to meet with each other. Maga threatened that the north would secede if his victory was not validated, and Apithy threatened that his base of Porto-Novo would join with Nigeria. Ethnic tensions increased with these threats and with mass migration of people back to their traditional ethnic territories. Many inside the country considered Dahomey to be close to civil war.

On 16 April 1970, Ahomadégbé and Maga met in the town of Savé, under French pressure, and agreed to the notion of a single party controlling government with a rotating presidency. Apithy did not attend the meeting and rejected the proposal, suggesting to the military that they instead pick one of their own to be the next president. The military leaders rejected this proposal and endorsed the shared presidency idea. Apithy then agreed to participate in the Presidential Council. Zinsou, with only 3% of the vote, was ignored in the discussions and left the country for France. Historian Samuel Decalo commented that although coups and crises were regular in the country's short history, "the April 1970 crisis was the most ominous Dahomey had ever faced."

== The triumvirate ==
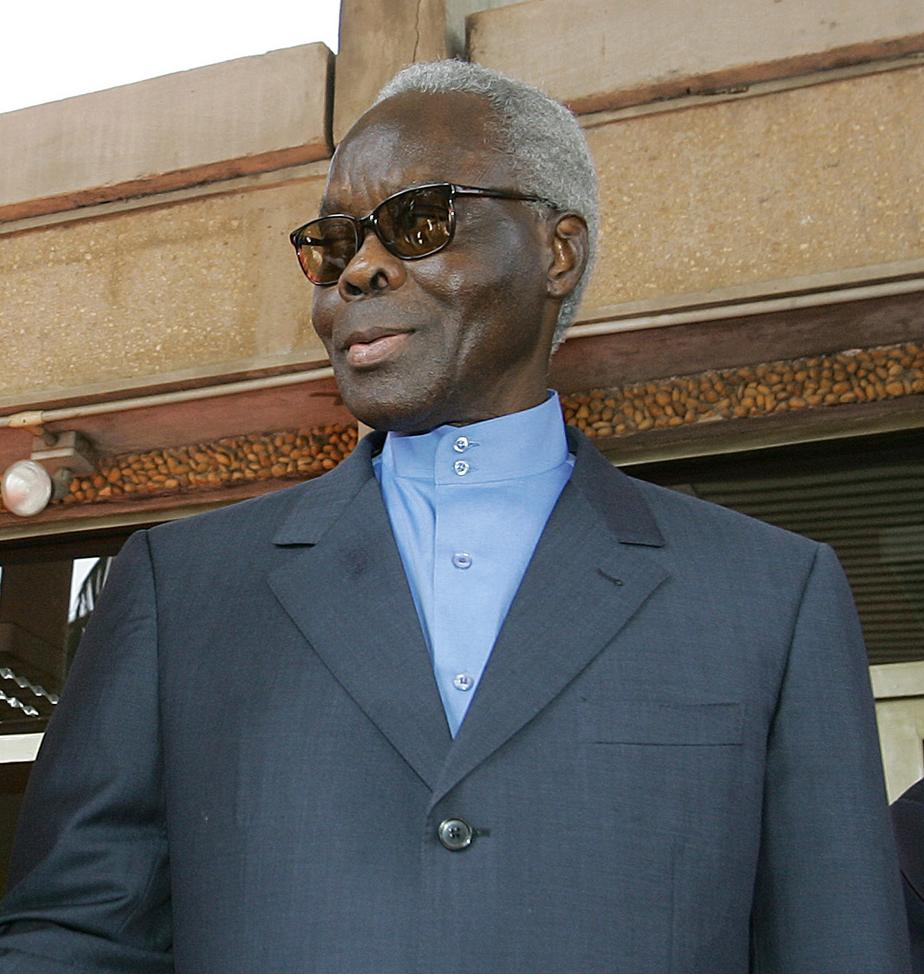
Mathieu Kérékou led the military coup that ended the Presidential Council in 1972, then ruled as the military dictator of the country until 1990.

To reduce the tension throughout the country, all three candidates accepted the military governing council's resolution (written closely with Maga), which stipulated that starting in May 1970, each of the three main candidates would be part of a Presidential Council that would hold all legislative and executive power in the government and decide on all major policy issues. The charter of the Council established that one member of the council would serve as the head of state for two-year periods before rotating to other members until all three leaders had held the position of president. The individual president would govern some of the affairs of the state, managing the civil service, military and bureaucracy. However, policy decisions would be set by unanimous decision of the entire Presidential Council, and if a unanimous decision could not be reached, a vote of the majority could pass policies. Ministry posts in the country would be divided evenly between the three members of the council with each one appointing four ministers, and the sitting president would have the power to appoint the Minister of the Military and the Minister of the Interior. Each individual also pledged not to abuse their control of the military to try and remain in power after the two-year period had ended. Under the chairmanship of de Souza, the military was largely stabilized in its leadership and returned to the barracks.

On 7 May 1970, Maga became the head of state and began governing the country. Although unions and the military had agreed to the agreement and all three candidates supported it, there remained tension between the various powers in the new arrangement. In order to appease unions, Maga promised that public service union salaries would be immune from any budget cuts. Although there were forces in the military opposed to the government, many of the coup leaders of the 1960s had largely left the country or withdrawn from politics. The relationship between the three leaders remained tense, but a Maga-Ahomadégbé alliance against Apithy on a number of issues kept the triumvirate functioning during Maga's tenure. With unions largely docile, the high ranks of the military committed to the council, and the members of the council waiting for their turns to govern, domestic and foreign policy were able to come to the fore in 1971 (the first year without a major political crisis in the government since 1966). Although some small policies were begun, the council passed few policies and largely simply "froze the status quo."

Various development attempts dominated the domestic agenda during Maga's administration. Unlike many other countries in Africa at the time, this did not involve nationalizing many of the industries in the country. Instead the country sought to expand its foreign tourism sector and oil exploration along the coast. The country, using French and German investment, began a series of projects to create resorts and tourist potential along the coast of the country. Union Oil had begun oil exploration off the coast of the country in the 1960s but had withdrawn in the chaos of 1970. Maga was able to secure a new contract with Shell Oil to begin a 9-year exploration deal in 1971. The agreement with the unions and other investments within the country were largely financed through a significant loan from the French government. However, at the same time, the three members of the council were provided significant personal wealth through the arrangement. Each was provided significant funds to spend on their presidential residences, payment for many members of a personal staff, and given identical Mercedes-Benz W108s. Trade from the country increased by 14% during the Presidential Council although large trade and budget deficits remained.

On foreign policy, the Republic of Dahomey split with France and other African countries on the issues of China and South Africa. On the recognition of China, Dahomey broke with France and sided with the United States in voting against the recognition of Communist China in the United Nations. On the issue of South Africa, Dahomey was one of five countries to walk out of discussions in the Union of African States on opening contact with the apartheid regime in South Africa. Dahomey supported opening contact and trade relations with the regime, unlike much of the rest of the African states, and abstained on the final vote.

Military tension increased with a mutiny in the Ouidah barracks on 28 January 1972 by young officers demanding the removal of de Souza from his position at the head of the military. This coup was ended when Maga sent two military officers to discuss with the mutineers and made them some agreements which have never bee disclosed. This was followed on 23 March with a double coup attempt (two simultaneous coups organized by two different factions within the military) which only resulted in an attempted assassination attempt against de Souza who was slightly injured in the attack. The leaders of the two different factions (one faction led by Kouandété and one led by supporters of Zinsou), included 20 different officers and many civilians. Many were tried and six were sentenced to death, including Kouandété, although he was never executed by Maga or Ahomadégbé for fear of a hostile military reaction.

With the scheduled transfer of power from Maga to Ahomadégbé on 7 May 1972, there were rumors throughout the country that the transfer would not occur (often rumored that troops loyal to Maga would march south and prevent the transfer). Maga had promoted many northerners through the civil service and military ranks and many of them saw Ahomadégbé as a threat to these new positions. However, all three members stood together for the ceremony and power was transferred from Maga to Ahomadégbé. Maga declared the Presidential Council to be "one of the most beneficial institutions" because it allowed the country to heal. The alliance between Maga and Ahomadégbé which had allowed Maga to govern the country quickly broke apart, and instead Maga and Apithy made an alliance which kept Maga's associates in their ministerial positions and prevented Ahomadégbé from effectively governing. The only major policy effort pushed by Ahomadégbé was the declaration to create a single political party from the various regional political parties which would be the only party allowed when the Presidential Council would end, although in practice the divisions between the parties largely remained. The tensions between the three members reportedly became their most tense with the planned visit of French President Georges Pompidou in November.

After almost 6 months in power, a military coup was started on 26 October 1972 which removed Ahomadégbé from power and ended the Presidential Council. Major Kerekou, a protege of Kouandété, led the first armor company of the military to break into a Presidential Council meeting, where he declared the end of the Presidential Council. Kerekou announced the coup on national radio by saying that the "three headed figure [was] truly a monster" beset by "congenital deficiency...notorious inefficiency and...unpardonable incompetence." Similarly to the coup in 1963, the military intervention was viewed favorably by much of the population of the country. Kouandété was released from prison and Kerekou named himself the new head of state appointing military officers to the various ministerial posts. All the senior military officers were discharged from their positions. An alleged counter-coup led in May 1973 by Colonel Alley was suppressed by Kerekou and Alley was sentenced to 20 years in prison. The members of the Presidential Council and other prominent political figures were arrested and imprisoned or placed under house arrest until 1981. After they were released from house arrest in 1981, Apithy, Ahomadégbé, and Maga all moved to Paris. Following the coup, Kerekou proceeded to rule the country as a military dictator until 1991.
