= Benoît Sinzogan =

Beninese military officer and politician (1930–2021)

Foreign Minister of Benin
- In office December 19, 1967 – July 1968
- Preceded by: Émile Zinsou
- Succeeded by: Daouda Badarou

Member of the Military Directorate
- In office December 13, 1969 – May 7, 1970

Personal details
- Born: July 14, 1930 Abomey, Dahomey (now Benin)
- Died: January 11, 2021 (aged 90) Bohicon, Benin
- Occupation: military officer

Benoît Sinzogan (July 14, 1930 – January 11, 2021) was a Beninese military officer and politician, best known for leading his country's gendarmerie in the late 1960s. He was a member of the Fon ethnic group, which dominated the Beninese (then known as Dahomeyan) army from 1965 to 1967. After Maurice Kouandété usurped the presidency on December 17, Sinzogan was placed under house arrest until December 19. That day, Sinzogan was appointed Minister of Foreign Affairs, his first political post, which he held until July 1968. He was a member of the Military Directorate, which ruled Dahomey from 1969 to 1970. Academic Samuel Decalo described the man as "too timid to mount a coup" during the 1960s and 1970s, being "one of Dahomey's few senior officers not to attempt to."

== Military background ==
Sinzogan was born on July 14, 1930, in Abomey, Dahomey. He was a member of the Fon ethnic group, which dominated the Beninese (then known as Dahomeyan) army from 1965 to 1967. Sinzogan was General Christophe Soglo's aide and commander of the First Battalion in Cotonou.

Sinzogan's rise to power occurred during a period of intense regionalism in Dahomey. They were spurred on by the historical resentment shared by members of the former kingdoms of Abomey, Porto-Novo, and disorganised tribes from the north. Its result was the creation of three de facto tribal zones: the north, southeast, and southwest. This regionalism permeated into the armed forces, compounded by divisions of officers into cliques based on education. Hachème was a member of what Decalo called the Abomey clique, which also included prominent officers Philippe Aho, Jean-Baptiste Hachème, and Benoit Adandejan.

He was the original head of the Comité Militare de Vigilance when it was established on April 6, 1967, which was set up to administer President Christophe Soglo's regime. Maurice Kouandété was established as his vice president. As corruption began to seep in, the Comite lost its value. After Kouandete usurped the presidency on December 17, Sinzogan was placed under house arrest at the Ghezo military camp until December 19.

== Political career ==
That day, Sinzogan was appointed Minister of Foreign Affairs, his first political post, which he held until July 1968. In September, he was named the leader of the national police. He held that office until August 1970, during which time he was given the post of president of the gendarmerie.

On December 10, 1969, Kouandété staged another coup, against then-president Emile Derlin Zinsou. A Military Directorate was formed on December 13 to administer Dahomey in the aftermath. Sinzogan was a member, the head of the ministries of Justice, Foreign Affairs, and Education. When Hubert Maga was proclaimed head of a Presidential Council on May 7, 1970, Sinzogan lost that post.

Sinzogan was alternate judge of the military trial convened in 1972 to address an attempted coup that Kouandété tried to perpetrate. He handed the death penalty to Kouandété and two of his companions. In October, when Mathieu Kérékou seized power in a coup, Sinzogan was removed from the military and appointed commissioner of the National Society of the Development of the Forest (S.N.A.F.O.R.). Academic Samuel Decalo described the man as "too timid to mount a coup" during the 1960s and 1970s, being "one of Dahomey's few senior officers not to attempt to."

Political offices
Preceded by Émile Zinsou	Foreign Minister of Benin; 1967–1968	Succeeded by Daouda Badarou
Preceded by Daouda Badarou	Foreign Minister of Benin; 1969–1970	Succeeded by Daouda Badarou
