= November 1946 French legislative election in Dahomey =

Elections to the French National Assembly were held in French Dahomey on 10 November 1946. The territory elected a single member to the Assembly. Sourou-Migan Apithy was the only candidate, and was elected unopposed. Voter turnout was 59%.

== Results ==
Candidate	Votes	%
Sourou-Migan Apithy	32,977	100.00
Total	32,977	100.00
Valid votes	32,977	98.22
Invalid/blank votes	596	1.78
Total votes	33,573	100.00
Registered voters/turnout	57,153	58.74
Source: Sternberger et al.
