= Louis Atayi =

Togolese physician

- Born: Louis Anani Atayi; 1918
- Died: January 5, 2008; Lomé, Togo
- Spouse: Eléonore d'Almeida
- Scientific career
- Fields: Obstetrics and gynaecology; Public health
- Institutions: World Health Organization

Louis Atayi (September 8, 1918 – January 5, 2008) was a Togolese physician. He was noted for his research for the World Health Organization, particularly in the 1970s and 1980s.

He served as World Health Organization representative to Congo (Brazzaville) Senegal, Mauritania, The Gambia and Côte d'Ivoire. He retired in 1985 to settle in Lomé (Togo) where he died on January 5, 2008. Louis Anani Ayayi Atayi has published numerous medical journals and papers, a number of which were published during his period with the WHO in Brazzaville, Republic of the Congo. He has collaborated on numerous books with the noted Beninese physician Basile Adjou Moumouni, and in 1970, along with Moumouni and several others published the book, Une Conception intégrée des services de santé publique dans la Région africaine., a study of current public health issues within the Africa region, working for the Bureau régional de l'Afrique. Atayi was married to Eléonore d'Almeida and had four children.
