= Basile Adjou Moumouni =

Beninese physician (1922–2019)

- Born: October 25, 1922; Cotonou
- Died: November 12, 2019 (aged 97)
- Occupation: physician

Basile Adjou Moumouni (October 25, 1922 – November 12, 2019) was a Beninese physician. He was active in his native country when the west Africa country of Republic of Benin was called Dahomey. Spending almost his entire adult life outside his native country, he worked for the World Health Organization in Brazzaville. In the 1968 presidential election, he won with over 80 percent of the vote. This decision was annulled, however, by incumbent President Alphonse Alley because organised demonstrations prohibited almost three-quarters of the electorate from casting their ballots.

== Early life ==
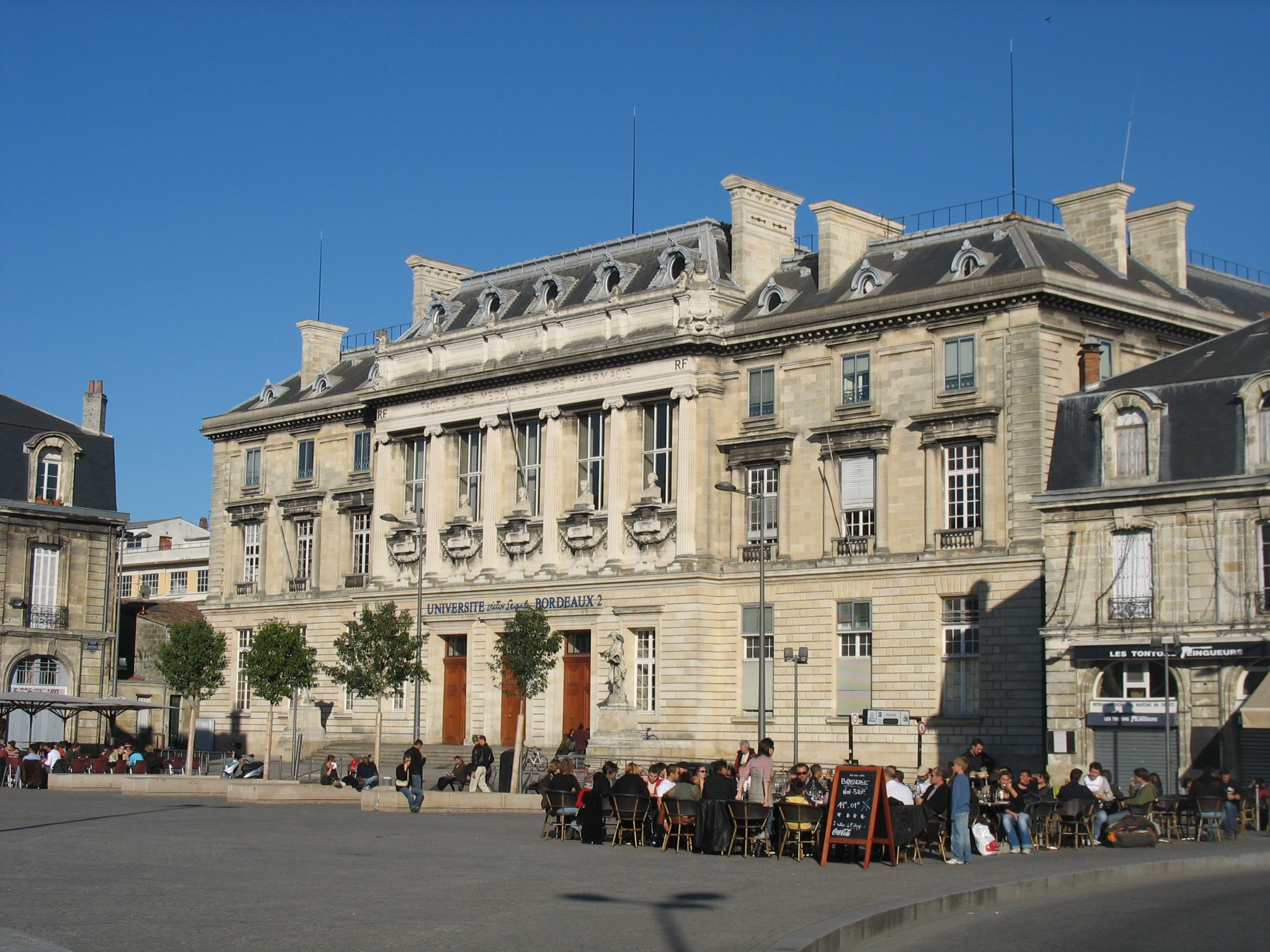
Moumouni graduated from the Victor Segalen Bordeaux 2 University of Bordeaux as a Doctor of Medicine

Moumouni was born in Cotonou on October 25, 1922. Moumouni graduated from the Victor Segalen Bordeaux 2 University of the University of Bordeaux in France with a Doctorate of Medicine, and later qualified as a Master of Public Health and Science, obtained respectively in Montreal, Quebec, Canada and Chicago, United States. After his university studies, Moumouni returned to Cotonou, where he practised as a physician until 1959, and would later spend much of his adult life outside Dahomey's borders. When independence was obtained, Moumouni was appointed Director of the Ministry of Health for his country. From 1963 to 1968, he worked for the World Health Organization in Brazzaville, Congo.

== 1968 presidential election ==
Moumouni was one of five candidates in his country's presidential election held on May 15, 1968. He was heavily backed by supporters of former premier Justin Ahomadegbé-Tomêtin and won the election with 83 percent of the vote, and 241,120 ballots of 289,079 cast. This made Moumouni the first democratically elected president of Dahomey since January 1964. However, only 27.6 percent of eligible voters actually voted. The election results were annulled by President Alphonse Amadou Alley because organised demonstrations prohibited almost three-quarters of the electorate from casting their ballots.

== Medical journalism ==
Moumoni returned to Brazzaville after the elections. He would continue with his medical research, particularly into public health services, publishing numerous books in collaboration with other distinguished physicians. In 1970, along with people such as L. Atayi and L. Charles, he published the book in Brazzaville, Une Conception intégrée des services de santé publique dans la Région africaine., a study of current public health issues within the Africa region, working for the Bureau régional de l'Afrique.

Mounmouni rejoined the World Health Organization and continued to publish his studies into African public health. In 1985 he collaborated with others once again to publish the book, Trainer's guide for health management: strengthening of public health delivery systems in Central and West Africa. published under the WHO.

== Later life ==
Moumouni retired from his medical career in 1991. Following this, he would continue as a writer, broadening his writing to cover topics such as politics and government, socio-economic conditions and even the history of Benin. On June 14, 2007, Moumouni released his book Pour un Bénin métamorphosé, la Nation que nous voulons, a book which examined political and socio-economic conditions in Benin since 1960. He worked on the book for seven years. The book was critically acclaimed, Professor Felix Iroko calling it Moumouni's victory on adversity.

Moumouni was also a professor at the University of Kinshasa in the Democratic Republic of Congo and for the Harvard Institute for International Development. He died in November 2019 at the age of 97.
