= United Nations Security Council Resolution 300 =

UN Security Council Resolution 300
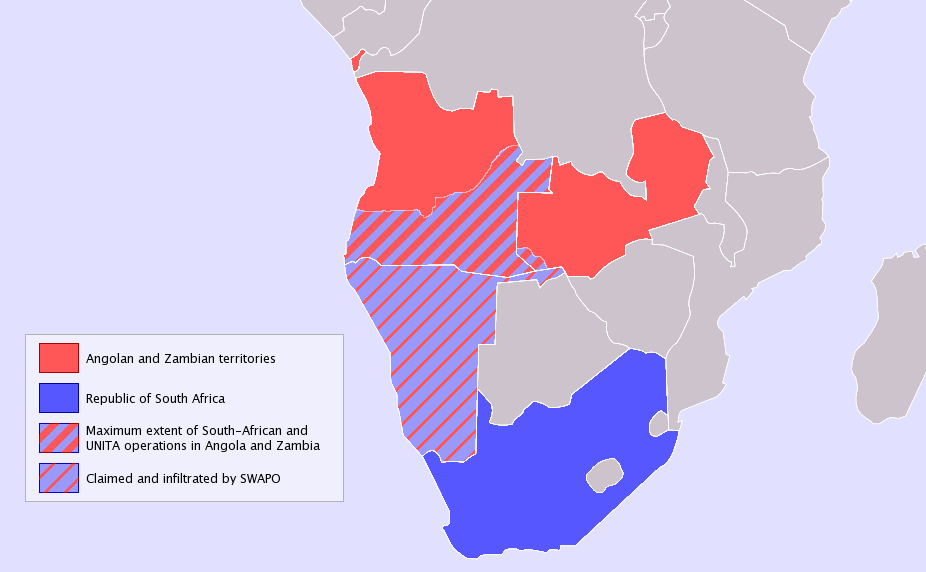
- South Africa border raids
- Date: 12 October 1971
- Meeting no.: 1,592
- Code: S/RES/300 (Document)
- Subject: Complaint by Zambia
- Voting summary: 15 voted for; None voted against; None abstained
- Result: Adopted

Security Council composition
- Permanent members: China; France; Soviet Union; United Kingdom; United States
- Non-permanent members: Argentina; Belgium; Burundi; Italy; Japan; Nicaragua; Poland; Sierra Leone; Somalia; Syria

United Nations Security Council Resolution 300, adopted unanimously on October 12, 1971, after supposed violations of Zambian air space by planes of the South African Air Force the Security Council reiterated its stance on sovereignty and territorial integrity and called on South Africa to respect Zambia's. The Council declared that in the event South Africa further violated Zambia's sovereignty it would meet again to examine the situation in accordance with the relevant provisions of United Nations Charter.

The meeting took place at the request of Zambia, who wrote a letter to the Security Council on October 6, after alleged violations along the Caprivi Strip. It was supported by 48 states.

== See also ==
- List of United Nations Security Council Resolutions 201 to 300 (1965–1971)
- South African Border War
- United Nations Security Council Resolution 393
