= Daouda Badarou =

Beninese politician (1929–2022)

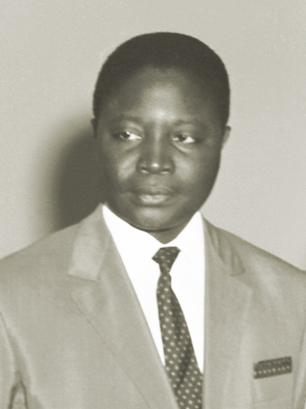
- Portrait of Daouda Badarou in 1966

Ambassador of Dahomey to France
- In office 19 June 1971 – 22 December 1972
- President: Mathieu Kérékou (26 October-22 December 1972); Justin Ahomadegbé (7 May-26 October 1972); Hubert Maga (19 June 1971-7 May 1972)
- Preceded by: Michel Ahouanmènou
- Succeeded by: Wilfrid de Souza

Minister of Foreign Affairs
- In office 7 May 1970 – 4 August 1971
- President: Hubert Maga
- Preceded by: Benoît Sinzogan
- Succeeded by: Michel Ahouanmènou

Minister of Foreign Affairs
- In office 31 July 1968 – 10 December 1969
- President: Émile Derlin Zinsou
- Preceded by: Benoît Sinzogan
- Succeeded by: Benoît Sinzogan

Minister of Public Health and Social Affairs
- In office 24 December 1965 – 17 December 1967
- President: Christophe Soglo
- Preceded by: Moussa Yaya Médé
- Succeeded by: Pierre Boni

Personal details
- Born: 7 January 1929 Porto-Novo, Dahomey (now Benin)
- Died: 31 January 2022 (aged 93) Boulogne-Billancourt, France
- Spouse: Émilie Badarou
- Children: 4, including Wally Badarou
- Education: École William Ponty; University of Paris
- Profession: Surgeon

Daouda Badarou (7 January 1929 – 31 January 2022) was a Beninese surgeon, politician and diplomat. He was Minister of Public Health and Social Affairs of Dahomey (now Benin) from 1965 to 1967, then Minister of Foreign Affairs from 1968 to 1969 and again from 1970 to 1971. He served as Ambassador to France from 1971 to 1972.

Badarou died on 31 January 2022, at the age of 93.

== Awards and honors ==
- Officer of the National Order of Dahomey (1969).
- Commander of the National Order of Dahomey (1970).
- Commander of the Order of the Federal Republic (1971).
