= Maurice Kouandété =

Beninese military officer and politician

Iropa Maurice Kouandété
- President Maurice Kouandété

De facto Leader of the Republic of Dahomey
- In office 17 December 1967 – 17 July 1968
- Preceded by: Christophe Soglo (as President)
- Succeeded by: Émile Derlin Zinsou (as President)

President of Dahomey
- In office 10 December 1969 – 13 December 1969
- Preceded by: Émile Derlin Zinsou
- Succeeded by: Paul-Émile de Souza

Chairman of the Revolutionary Committee
- In office 20 December 1967 – 21 December 1967
- Preceded by: Jean-Baptiste Hachème
- Succeeded by: Alphonse Alley

Prime Minister of Dahomey
- In office 21 December 1967 – 17 July 1968
- President: Alphonse Alley
- Preceded by: Office established
- Succeeded by: Office abolished

Vice-president of the Military Vigilance Committee (MVC)
- In office April 1967 – c. 17 December 1967
- Preceded by: Office established Unknown (as Vice-president of the National Renovation Committee)
- Succeeded by: Office abolished

Personal details
- Born: 22 September 1932 Gaba District, Dahomey
- Died: 7 April 2003 (aged 70) Natitingou
- Occupation: Military officer
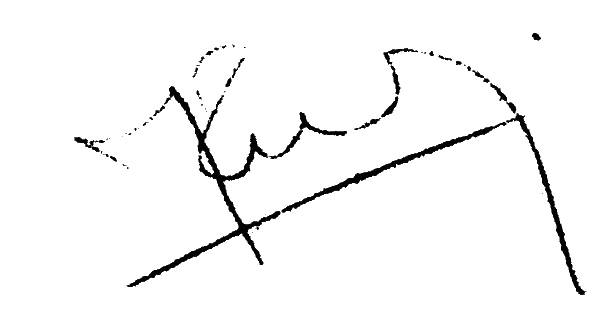
- Signature

Iropa Maurice Kouandété (22 September 1932 – 7 April 2003) was a Beninese military officer and politician. Kouandété enrolled in the army in his late teens. Over the years, he became popular among junior soldiers in the north and gained the contempt of those in the south. Jim Hoagland of The Washington Post described Kouandété as a "moody, brilliant and highly ambitious soldier".

On 17 December 1967 Kouandété led a military coup and toppled President Christophe Soglo. Kouandété seized the presidency, although he was unsure how to wield it. He handed power to Alphonse Alley two days later, and forced him to retire in 1968 in favor of Kouandété's choice, Emile Derlin Zinsou. Kouandété was appointed chief of staff of Dahomey's 1,500-man army and launched another coup against Zinsou, on 10 December 1969, to defend it. The military did not recognise Kouandété as legitimate, and the elections that followed paved the way toward a Presidential Council form of government. Kouandété attempted to usurp to power again at dawn on 23 March 1972, but the convoluted plot was foiled and Kouandété was sentenced to death. Kouandete was immediately pardoned when Major Mathieu Kérékou, his cousin, seized power on 26 October. After his pardon, Kouandété retired from military life and died in 2003.

== Early life and military career ==
Kouandété was born in the Gaba District of northern Dahomey to Somba parents. He was a cousin of Mathieu Kérékou, who also become president of Benin. In his late teens, Kouandété enrolled in the army, and went to Ecole Militaire and Saint Cyr in France. He began to rebel against superior officers such as Colonels Christophe Soglo and Alphonse Alley as well as, by extension, the entire Fon hierarchy, who dominated the Dahomeyan military. He grew in popularity among junior northern soldiers while those in the south increased their contempt of him. Jim Hoagland of The Washington Post described Kouandété as a "moody, brilliant and highly ambitious soldier".

Kouandété's rose to power during a period of intense regionalism in Dahomey. They were spurred by the historical resentment shared by members of the former kingdoms of Abomey, Porto-Novo, and disorganised tribes from the north. Its result led to the creation of three de facto tribal zones: the north, southeast, and southwest. This regionalism permeated into the armed forces, compounded by divisions of officers into cliques based on education.

Despite Kouandété's disdain for him, Soglo appointed the former to his palace guard in 1965. He was removed the next year after the president asserted Kouandété falsified reports in opposition to Soglo. Kouandété was appointed Alley's chef de cabinet in 1967 and his frequent opposition toward Alley during staff meetings helped to create factions in the Dahomeyan Army. In April, Kouandété became the vice president of the Comité Militaire de Vigilance, which was established to manage the Soglo administration. Beside his usual contempt, Kouandété became increasingly concerned about the president's "unmilitary" ways.

== 1967 coup d'état ==
On 17 December 1967, Kouandété, Kerekou, and 60 other soldiers led a military coup and toppled Soglo. Kouandété seized power although he was unsure of how to wield it. Even though he was not popular among the general public, members of Kouandété's faction urged him to remain at his post. Meanwhile, France refused to provide aid to Dahomey and did not recognise Kouandété as legitimate. Two days later, in an attempt to fix the crisis in Dahomey, Kouandété appointed the well-liked Alley provisional president, whom Kouandété previously put under house arrest. Kouandété served as prime minister thereafter.

Their roles were only temporary, as power was to be ceded back to civilians in six months' time. By that time, Alley became little more than Kouandété's mouthpiece. On 17 July 1968 Kouandété forced Alley to resign and handed power to Dr. Emile Derlin Zinsou. This transition of power was enacted mostly to improve relations with the French, as Zinsou was popular among them. Zinsou was not expected to be chosen president, as he believed that Kouandété's coup was an illegal matter. He also condemned Gnassingbé Eyadéma of Togo, whom Kouandété regarded highly. In September, Alley was forced to resign his position as chief of staff and was released from the military. Kouandété was chosen as the next chief of staff.

== 1969 coup d'état ==
In 1969, Kouandété discovered that Zinsou planned to replace him and cut the size of the armed forces. On 10 December 1969 Zinsou was overthrown by Kouandété. Zinsou was met with soldiers firing automatic guns when he arrived at his presidential palace. The former president escaped with an injury, though two of his bodyguards were murdered. Kouandété justified the coup by saying that Zinsou failed to reconcile the country.

The military, however, did not recognize Kouandété. Because the two men could stop quarreling, a Military Directorate was established with Paul Emile de Souza as its chairman, Kouandete a member, and Col. Benoit Sinzogan of the Gendarmie the occupant of the third seat. An election was held on 28 March 1970 to determine the true president. This time, veteran politicians Hubert Maga, Sourou-Migan Apithy, and Justin Ahomadégbé-Tomêtin were allowed to campaign in this election, and they took advantage of the opportunity. Violent outbursts accompanied these campaigns; unvalidated reports state that six people were killed were wounded at incidents in Parakou on the eve of the elections. The elections were later annulled, and a presidential council, which consisted of Maga, Ahomadégbé-Tomêtin, and Apithy, was set up on 7 May with a presidency that changed every two years. Maga inaugurated this system for the first two years. Kouandété had his chief of staff status revoked and was forced to be an aide of Alley, who was recently let out of jail. The former was also appointed Deputy Secretary of National Defense.

== 1972 coup attempt ==
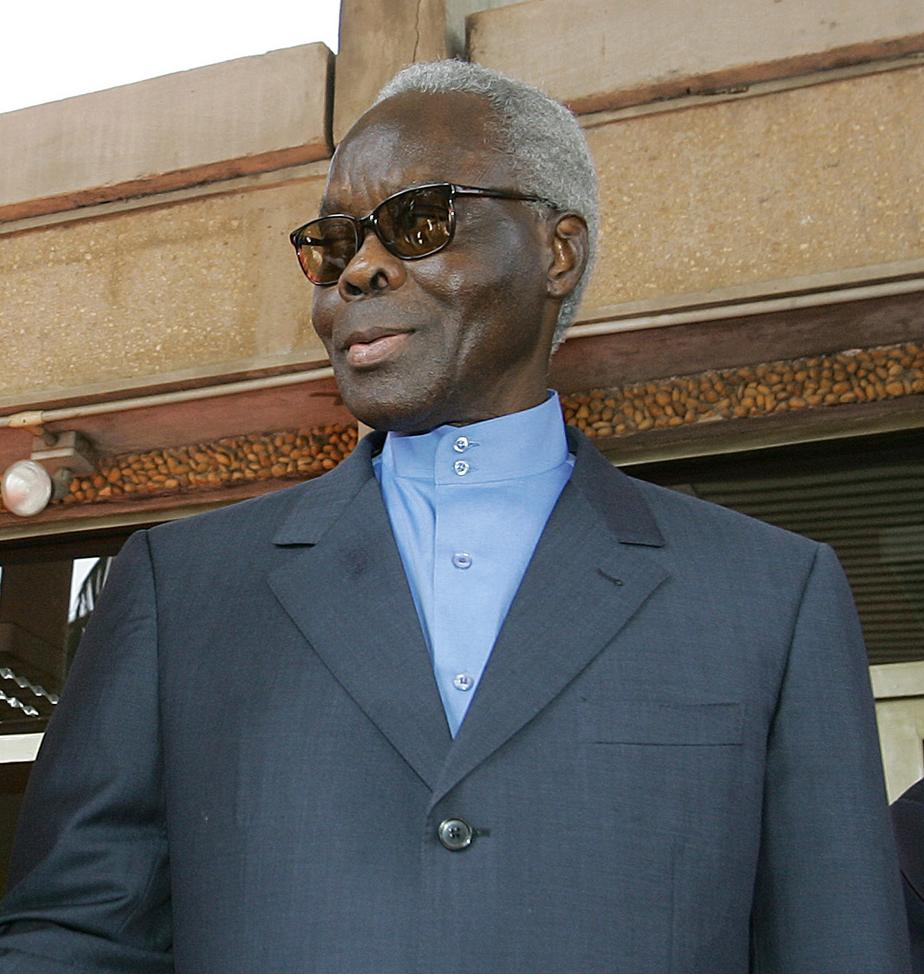
Mathieu Kérékou in 2006

Kouandété attempted to usurp to power again at dawn on 23 February. When he first heard of the mutiny, Ahomadégbé-Tomêtin believed it to be an attempt by Maga to retain power. Leading the Ouidah garrison, Kouandété also attempted to take over government buildings and murder de Souza. During the operation, assailant Major Moumouni was mortally wounded by de Souza's bullets. The plot was foiled, although Maga cancelled a visit to France to attend to the matter at hand. A 12-member military commission soon discovered another plot that would have been undertaken simultaneous to Kouandété's. According to its findings, Captains Glélé and Pierre Boni were going to follow Kouandété until de Souza was assassinated, and would then kill their leader and insert Zinsou back into power.

The organization of a military trial was slow, and it did not begin until 12 May. The court tried 21 men in addition to Kouandété, (Note: The true number of accused men was not known until the trial convened.) mostly military officers but also several commoners and Maga bodyguards. The punishments were announced on 16 May. Kouandété received the death penalty, as did Captains Josué and Glélé, Quartermaster Sergeant Agboton, and a corporal and a sergeant in absentia. Lesser sentences were handed to five men who were given life imprisonment, two who would serve 20 years in prison, another with 15 years, two with ten, and two with five. An additional four were acquitted. The sentences were never carried out; the jurors believed that Kouandété would seize power in another coup. He was immediately pardoned when Major Mathieu Kérékou seized power on 26 October 1972.

== Later life and death ==
After his pardon Kouandété retired from military life. The former president died on 7 April 2003 in Natitingou. He was 70 years old and had been suffering an undisclosed illness. The Beninese government decreed three national days of mourning from 10 to 13 April. During this period, flags remained at half-staff until his national funeral was held on the last day of mourning. According to a government press release, the mourning was held "in recognition of exceptional services" that Kouandété provided Benin.

== Bibliography ==
- Decalo, Samuel (April 1973), "Regionalism, Politics, and the Military in Dahomey", The Journal of Developing Areas, 7 (3), College of Business, Tennessee State University: 449–478, JSTOR 4190033 (subscription required).
- Decalo, Samuel (1976), Historical Dictionary of Dahomey (People's Republic of Benin), Metuchen, New Jersey: Scarecrow Press, ISBN 0-8108-0833-1, OCLC 1959674.
- Dossou-Yovo, Noel (September 1999), "The Experience of Benin", International Journal on World Peace, 16 (3), ISSN 0742-3640, OCLC 211426384, archived from the original on 2010-09-16 – via Questia.
- Hudgens, Jim; Trillo, Richard; Calonnec, Nathalie (2003), The Rough Guide to West Africa, London: Rough Guides, ISBN 1-84353-118-6, OCLC 176832097.
- Ihonvbere, Julius Omozuanvbo; Mbaku, John Mukum (2003), Political Liberalization and Democratization in Africa: Lessons from Country Experiences, Westport, Connecticut: Praeger, ISBN 0-313-05151-8, OCLC 60127996.
- Kneib, Martha (2007), Benin, Cultures of the World, Tarrytown, New York: Marshall Cavendish, ISBN 978-0-7614-2328-7, OCLC 62109915.
- Ronen, Dov (1975), Dahomey: Between Tradition and Modernity, Ithaca, New York: Cornell University Press, ISBN 0-8014-0927-6, OCLC 1527290.
