= July 1968 Dahomeyan presidential election =

A referendum on Émile Derlin Zinsou's candidacy for president was held in Dahomey on 28 July 1968. The results of the May 1968 presidential elections had been annulled due to low voter turnout. The military government appointed Zinsou to the position on July 17, 1968, but he accepted only on the condition that a referendum regarding his appointment be held. His candidacy was supported by 76% of voters, with a 73% turnout.

== Results ==
Choice	Votes	%
For	630,018	76.38
Against	194,789	23.62
Total	824,807	100.00
Valid votes	824,807	99.61
Invalid/blank votes	3,269	0.39
Total votes	828,076	100.00
Registered voters/turnout	1,140,378	72.61
Source: Nohlen et al.
