= Sourou-Migan Apithy =

President of Dahomey from 1964 to 1965 (1913–1989)

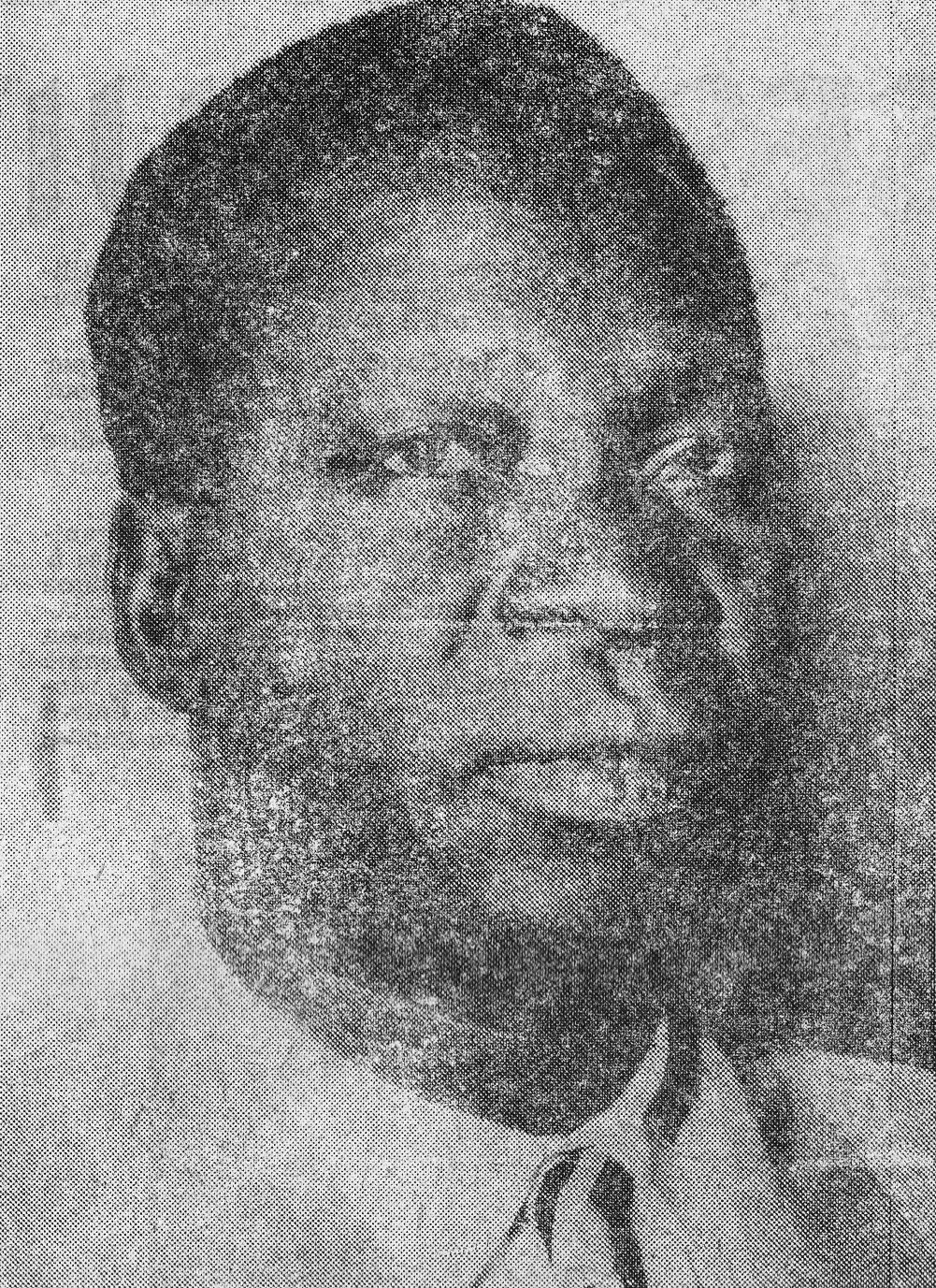
- Apithy in 1958

2nd President of Dahomey
- In office 25 January 1964 – 27 November 1965
- Vice President: Justin Ahomadégbé-Tomêtin
- Preceded by: Christophe Soglo
- Succeeded by: Justin Ahomadegbé-Tomêtin

Personal details
- Born: 8 April 1913 Porto-Novo, Dahomey
- Died: 3 December 1989 (aged 76) Paris, France
- Party: PDD

Sourou-Migan Marcellin Joseph Apithy (8 April 1913 – 3 December 1989) was a Beninese political figure most active when his country was known as Dahomey. He arose on a political scene where one's power was dictated by what region in Dahomey one lived in.

Apithy studied at Bordeaux in a Lycée or secondary school. After he completed his studies there, he was accepted at the public Political Science School in Paris where he took courses in commercial studies. He later worked at a French company in Western Africa as an expert accountant. Before his country acquired its independence, beginning 1945, he was part of Dahomey's Constitutive Assembly and was re-elected for a number of terms. When Hubert Maga nominated him to that function, he was also the prime minister of Dahomey (Benin) from 1957 to 1958. By 1960, he had become Vice President of Dahomey.

He served as the 2nd President of Dahomey between 25 January 1964 and 27 November 1965, when he was overthrown by Christophe Soglo after infighting among the members of the government. After this event he fled to Paris for the first time but he returned to Cotonou after the 1970 coup, when he became a member of the Presidential Triumvirate during the early 1970s. Following the 1972 coup, he was put under arrest alongside Justin Ahomadegbé-Tomêtin and Maga, and was not released until 1981.

He was sometimes referred to as being part of the 'three-headed monster' of the 1960s in Benin. He died in exile in his Paris house, in December 1989, shortly before the transition to democracy in his country.

== Early life ==
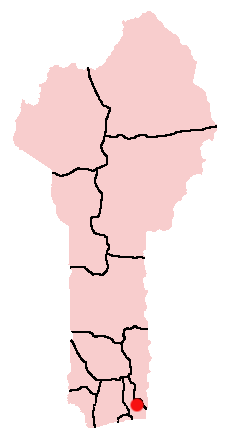
Location of Porto-Novo in Benin

Born on 8 April 1913 in Porto-Novo, Apithy was a descendant of an Ogu royal family though was not born into privilege himself. His middle name, Migan, signified familial ties with chief ministers of old Dahomeyan kingdoms. He began his education at local mission schools and gained a bias for Roman Catholicism, for which he would later be insulted. Apithy would later become assistant teacher at his school. To further his education, Apithy travelled to Paris in 1933. After legal and economic studies at the Free School of Political Sciences, the National School of Economic and Social Organization, and at the Improvement Center in Business Administration of the Paris Chamber of Commerce, Apithy gained his diploma in accounting.

He also served as counsel in Paris and Dakar appeal courts. Married, he fathered two children. Having voluntarily enlisted in the army, Apithy saw combat from 1939 to 1940 as an artillery officer. He would not return to Dahomey until 1945. Shortly after his return Francis Aupiais, a well-liked Roman Catholic pastor, encouraged Apithy to pursue a career in politics. It began in July, when the latter was a participant in the Monnerville Commission.

Running as a Socialist candidate, Apithy was elected to represent Togo and Dahomey at the French Constituent Assembly in 1945, receiving 6,600 votes out of a total of 9,057. Voters in the election had to be French citizens or Dahomeyans whom the French government deemed responsible. His nomination as a candidate for the Assembly was a strategic move on the part of the Europeans; they wished to elect a black person to appease their colonists, while they still held full power. Nonetheless, Apithy did pass some legislation at the Assembly, including the February 1946 formation of a secondary school in Porto-Novo. Apithy was said to have ended slavery in Dahomey, although in fact he was not involved with the abolition bill. He was named a member of the Commission on Overseas Territories and debated on the political situation of the overseas departments and territories of France. In June 1946, he was re-elected to his post with 8,096 ballots of 9.069 cast, and was soon appointed attorney general of Dahomey.

Thereafter Apithy was named to several political posts, all while a member of Dahomey's only political party, the Dahomeyan Progressive Union (UPD). He was the choice for vice president of the Rassemblement Democratique Africain (RDA), though left the organization shortly afterwards when facing Catholic opposition. The year 1946 also marked his entry into the General Council, becoming one of its inaugural 30 representatives.

In the November 1946 French National Assembly elections, Apithy ran under the ticket of Section Française de l'Internationale Ouvrière (SFIO). Winning 32,977 votes out of 33,605 cast, he captured Dahomey's sole seat allotted at the Assembly. His only opponent, Emile Poisson, left the race the day before the election.

== Deputy to the French National Assembly ==
One of Apithy's first actions in Paris was naming his membership with the Commissions on Methods of Communication, Economic Affairs, and Finances. After joining the Grand Council of French West Africa (AOF) in 1947, the new deputy proposed a bill on its functions. He also suggested the creation of a bank covering the AOF and Togo, and due to his efforts this bill was passed into law. In 1949, he became secretary of the National Assembly and frequently answered questions regarding the AOF and overseas territories during his first term.

In the legislative elections of 17 June 1951, Dahomey was allowed an additional representative in the Assembly. Apithy faced a new opponent: northern teacher Hubert Maga. The fact that two seats were allotted to Dahomey was only known in the last week of April. As per an electoral law of May 1951, each candidate had to give the names of another who would occupy the second seat in the event that the other party's first candidate came in third or below. Apithy chose Emile Derlin Zinsou as his running mate, with Apithy leading on the electoral list as of a meeting on 29 April. However, Zinsou argued that he would be forced to vacate seat on the Assembly of the French Union and that someone from the north of Dahomey would be able to fill it. Therefore, on 23 May it was decided that Zinsou and Apithy would be listed in that order. Maga, meanwhile, chose northern merchant Paul Darboux and the latter was content as second on the list.

Zinsou and Apithy, in stark contrast to their northern rivals, could not agree on who would headline the list. It reached a point, on 27 May, that the two southern candidates decided to run individually: Zinsou campaigned with school teacher Gilbert Kpakpo, while Apithy partnered with French administrator Edouard Dunglas under the newly formed Union Francaise. Maga and Darboux capitalised on growing cynicism regarding southern Dahomey dominating the French colony's politics, allying themselves with the northern tribes.

The May 1951 law also enlarged the electorate from 61,958 to 333,693. Some dead people were even counted as electors due to the mishandling of election cards. The Cotonou newspaper L'Etoile du Dahomey noted the presence of a man who would give an unlimited number of cards as long as they promised to vote for Apithy. Altogether, however, only 44% of the population voted on election day. Apithy was reelected a deputy with 53,463 votes out of 147,350 cast. Maga captured the second seat with 49,329, with Zinsou/Kpakpo receiving a mere 18,410 ballots. Several smaller parties hosted several other candidates, which received the rest of the votes. Only 2.2 percent of Apithy's votes came from the northern region, while 64 percent came from the Porto-Novo metropolitan area.

The 1951 election illustrated the intense regionalism that was forming in the French colony; the election has been cited as when regionalist parties arose. Indeed, it was the first whose pamphlets mentioned ethnicity. Regionalism in Dahomey was spurred by the historical resentment shared by members of the former kingdoms of Abomey, Porto-Novo, and disorganised tribes from the north. Its result was the creation of three de facto tribal zones: the north, southeast, and southwest, which were led by Maga, Apithy, and Justin Ahomadégbé-Tomêtin, respectively. Most of Apithy's backing came from the Yoruba, while Maga was mostly backed by the Bariba and Ahomadégbé-Tomêtin, the Fon and Gouns. Regionalistic attitudes would only intensify during the rest of the political careers of the three men, collectively known as Dahomey's triumvirate.

Apithy renamed his party the Parti Républicain du Dahomey (PRD) in July. The party won a majority of seats in the March 1952 Territorial Assembly election. Apithy, meanwhile, was busy passing a bill regarding fiscal advantages in metropolitan enterprises in overseas territories. He was a political opportunist, frequently switching allegiances if it fit his needs.

On 2 January 1956 elections to the French National Assembly were held, with Ahomadégbé-Tomêtin replacing Zinsou as the main third-party candidate. As in 1951, the running mates were from the same regions as the main candidate so as to draw loyalty to a particular party, in Maga's case the Dahomeyan Democratic Movement (MDD), and Dahomeyan Democratic Union (UDD) for Ahomadégbé-Tomêtin. Apithy chose Djibodé Aplogan, Maga chose Gaustin Gbaguidi, and Ahomadégbé-Tomêtin was paired with Alexandre Adandé. Apithy and Maga were reelected deputies with 64,344 and 60,601 votes, respectively, out of the 179,119 cast.

The senior deputy was named a member of the Commission on Overseas Territories and the Commission of Accountancy; he was elected vice-president of the former, and secretary of the latter. He proposed a resolution to create a regimen for a customs union between Dahomey and Togo, and several reports under the Commission on Overseas Territories. Apithy also served a variety of functions not related to the Assembly, such as being elected mayor of Porto-Novo in 1956. Shortly after becoming president of the General Council of the AOF in 1957, Apithy was voted into the presidency of the Territorial Assembly of Dahomey. He also led a parliamentary group for relations between France and Liberia.

== Premier of Dahomey ==
Apithy was elected Premier of Dahomey in 1958. He was Minister of Finance in 1960, and from October 1963 to January 1964.

== Presidential council ==
=== Background and 1970 election ===
On 10 December 1969 Emile Derlin Zinsou was overthrown by Maurice Kouandété, who had installed him as president in the first place. The military, however, refused to recognize Kouandété, and as the two men could not reach agreement, a Military Directorate was established with Paul Emile de Souza as its chairman. An election was held on 28 March 1970 to determine the true president. On this occasion, the triumvirate was allowed to campaign, and they did not miss the chance. Intimidation and bribery were commonplace, and the electoral campaign saw the comeback of regional loyalties. It was also marked by a series of violent outbursts; invalidated reports state that six people were killed or wounded at incidents in Parakou on the eve of the elections. Fellow candidate Zinsou asserted that Maga supporters had killed one of his supporters during said incidents.

These charges did not affect Maga's standing in the polls; he received a majority of the vote in the north, and Apithy and Ahomadégbé-Tomêtin received a majority in the southeast and southwest/central, respectively. The election results were as follows: 252,551 citizens voted for Maga; 200,091 for Ahomadégbé-Tomêtin, and 186,332 for Apithy. In the entire south, Maga received 24,000 votes compared to the 180,000 who voted for him in the Borgou Department, obtaining 97.3 percent of the 78 percent turnout. Zinsou, running to counter the constant tribal clashes, received 3 percent, with 17,551 votes.

Nonetheless, de Souza decided to nullify the results from Atakora, the region where Maga received the most votes, on 3 April. Outraged, Maga formed the Assembly of the Peoples of the North, which threatened to secede unless he was declared President. He refused to leave his campaign headquarters at Parakou even to attend political meetings. Maga's reaction to the nullification prompted many southern workers to flee the north. Apithy stated that he would convince his region to join Nigeria if Maga took the presidency and took steps to bribe his way into that office. Ahomadégbé-Tomêtin claimed Maga had defrauded the electoral system to his advantage. In contrast with the other three former presidents, Zinsou admitted that he had been defeated and decided participate in bargaining, explaining that he rejected the idea of a coalition "for personal reasons". The other former Presidents, on the other hand, agreed to a hasty compromise on 13 April to prevent a civil war.

=== Under Maga ===
A presidential council, consisting of Maga, Ahomadégbé-Tomêtin, and Apithy, was set up on 7 May with a presidency that changed every two years. Maga inaugurated this system for the first two years. Each man agreed to not use the military to extend their term or use any other means toward that consequence. If decisions were not unanimous during the first round of voting, a two councilman majority would suffice on the second round. The council served as the executive and legislative branch of Dahomey.

The cabinet was composed of four Ahomadégbé-Tomêtin allies, three Maga allies, and three allies of Apithy. Gabriel Lozes, appointed minister of finance; Theophile Paoletti, new minister of information and tourism; Edmond Doussou-Yovo, minister of education; and Karl Ahouansou, minister of communication, were all friends of Ahomadégbé-Tomêtin. Maga's colleagues in the cabinet were Pascal Chabi Kao, minister of finance; Albert Ouassa, minister of health; and Chabi Mama, minister of rural development; while Apithy friends were Ambroise Agboton, minister of labor; Joseph Keke, minister of economy and planning; and Michel Toko, minister of justice and guardian of the seals. Daouda Badarou, who had served as foreign minister under Zinsou, was allowed to keep his job.

Maga's economic policies during his chairmanship helped quiet union leaders whose protests during his presidency had been intense. He helped create a tax plan that would finance their salaries by cutting expenditures and cracking down on tax evasion. In 1970 Dahomey witnessed a surplus of 429 million CFA francs, rising to a 570 million CFA franc surplus the following year. With the national economy in a favorable position, Apithy and the rest of the council could afford a number of luxuries, including three houses and three Mercedes-Benz 300 automobiles to be shared amongst themselves, and festivals for the anniversary of the founding of the triumvirate.

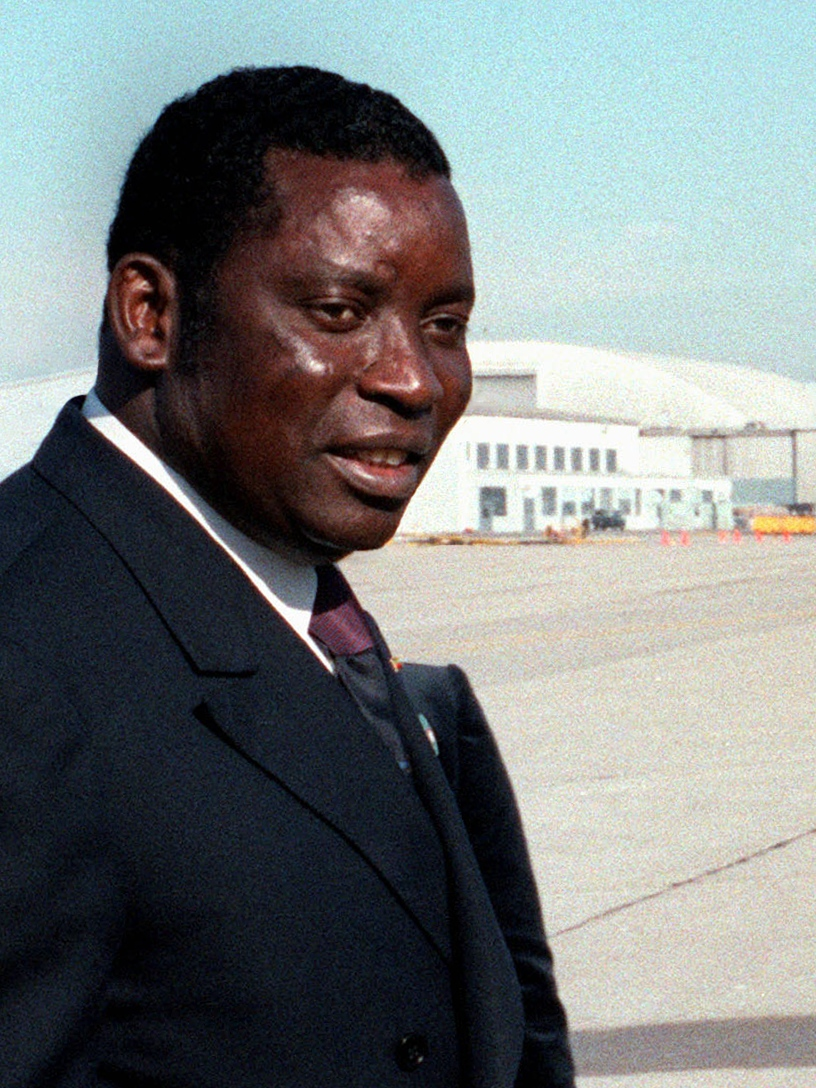
Togolese president Etienne Eyadema, who would later change his name to Gnassingbé Eyadéma. His decision to extradite opposition leader Noe Kutuklui, and the Presidential Council's agreement, helped to undermine its popularity.

The Council lost popularity with the Kutuklui Affair. By decree of Apithy and the rest of the council, Togolese opposition leader Noe Kutuklui was officially expelled from Dahomey on 27 October 1971, where he had been practicing law since the late 1960s. It was at the request of General Etienne Eyadema, president of Togo, as Kutuklui had been involved in several plots against Eyadema's military government. The council's decision to extradite him spurred demonstrations in Cotonou. Maga was unable to carry out his decision; Alphonse Alley protected Kutuklui and took him to an unknown place outside of Dahomey. Col. Alley received no punishment whatsoever for his role in the affair.

Students were some of those involved in the protests, and they soon had another reason to conflict with their government. On 5 November 1971 Apithy and his administration shut down the Union Général des Etudiants et Eleves de Dahomey (UGEED), a radical youth group which sought to "transform Dahomey into a battlefield" using "workers, soldiers, and policemen." This stemmed from UGEED-sponsored demonstrations against the minister of education when he failed to attend an educational meeting. Students whose schools followed the strike were allowed back to school on 19 November, and only if their parents signed documents that said they would not participate in more demonstrations. If they failed to comply, they would be expelled from the educational system of Dahomey. Government-instituted rallies were arranged to support the ban.

The military was also aroused. The formation of a presidential council only further enraged the army. Ahomadégbé-Tomêtin was ambushed while traveling to a rally in Abomey on 7 May 1971. Maga initially denied its existence, and to this day details are unclear. An artillery camp at Ouidah was the location of another military uprising on 28 January 1972. The president sent two officers to overpower the rebels although no punishment was undertaken. Both Ahomadégbé-Tomêtin and Maga believed that the latter incident was an attempted coup.

Kouandété attempted to usurp power again at dawn on 23 February. When he first heard of the mutiny, Ahomadégbé-Tomêtin believed that it was an attempt by Maga to remain in power. Leading the Ouidah garrison, Kouandété also attempted to take over government buildings and murder de Souza. Over the course of the operation, assailant Major Moumouni was mortally wounded by de Souza's bullets. The plot was foiled, although Maga canceled a visit to France to attend to the matter at hand. A 12-member military commission would soon discover another plot, that would have been undertaken simultaneous to Kouandété's. According to its findings, Captains Glele and Pierre Boni were going to follow Kouandété until de Souza was assassinated, when they would eradicate their leader and insert Zinsou back into power. The recent events epitomised the council's "fear and contempt" for the military.

=== Under Ahomadégbé-Tomêtin ===
Maga transferred power to Ahomadégbé-Tomêtin on 7 May 1972. This was the first time in 12 years that the head of Dahomey was succeeded in a nonmilitary fashion. The new chairman congratulated Maga and praised the triumvirate as "one of [Dahomey's] most beneficial institutions." It was believed that the triumvirate would continually undermine each other, and the simple transition of power was viewed as a positive step toward Dahomeyan unity.

The Presidential Council was slow in organizing a military trial for the 1972 coup plotters, and it did not begin until 12 May. The court tried 21 men besides Kouandété, (Note: The true number of accused men was not known until the trial was convened.) mostly military officers but also including several commoners and even Maga bodyguards. The punishments were announced on 16 May. Kouandété received the death penalty, as did Captains Josué and Glélé, Quartermaster Sergeant Agboton, and a corporal and a sergeant in absentia. Lesser sentences were handed to five men who were given life imprisonment, two who would serve 20 years in prison, another with 15 years, two with ten, and two with five. An additional four were acquitted. The sentences were never carried out; the jurors believed that Kouandété would seize power in another coup.

Another delayed function of the council was the formation of the Assemblée Consultative Nationale, an advisory assembly required by the 1970 constitution. As per the constitution, such an assembly would contain 30 members advising councilmen on economic, social, and other issues, with Paul Darboux presiding. It was not established until July 1972, due to, in the words of academic Samuel Decalo, "intensive horse-trading between the partners in the Presidential Council ... and pressures from their political lieutenants for a position in the Assembly."

One of the most notable aspects of Ahomadégbé-Tomêtin's time in power was the Kovacs Affair. It began with Pascal Chabi Kao being given a monopoly over selling official stationery to the Presidential Council and spread to claims of bribery and embezzlement. Ahomadégbé-Tomêtin tried to fire Chabi Kao, but Maga, who was Chabi Kao's mentor, refused. Maga convinced Apithy to help and the bill was vetoed.

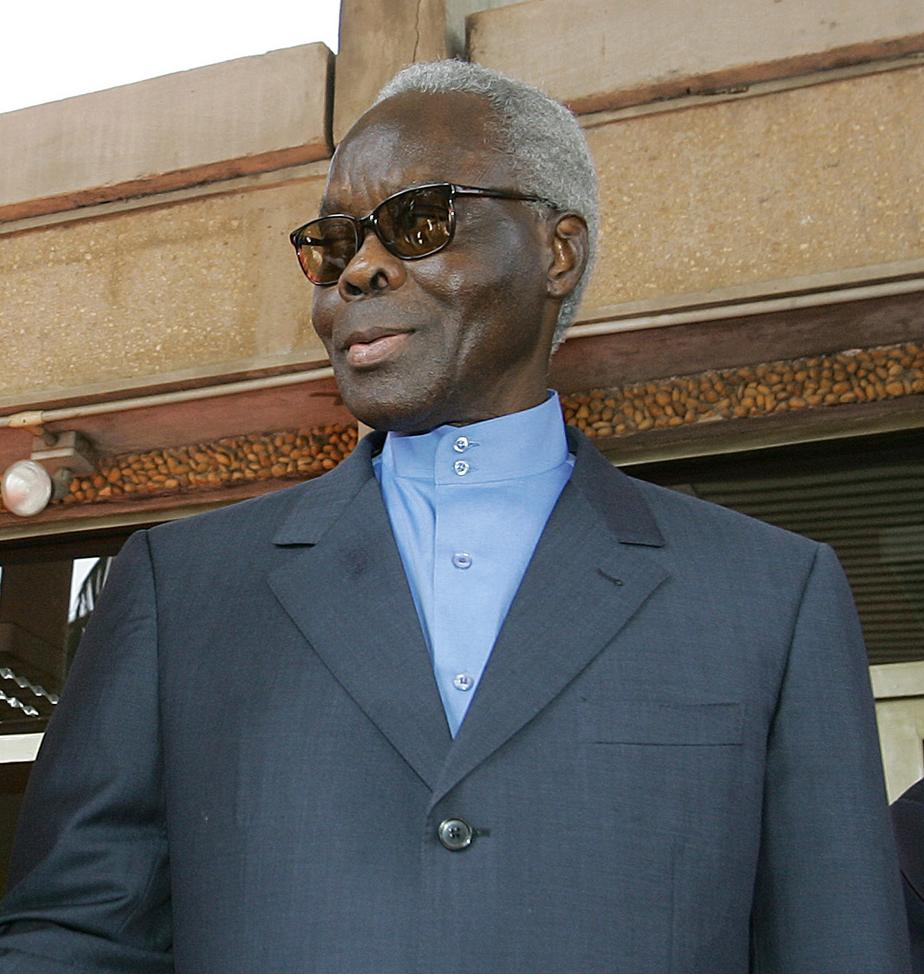
Mathieu Kérékou, who overthrew the Presidential Council in 1972, in a 2006 photograph

Another coup was launched by soldiers of the Ouidah garrison on 26 October. This one, however, was successful, and Major Mathieu Kérékou was installed as president. It occurred during a cabinet meeting between Maga and Ahomadégbé-Tomêtin. (Note: Apithy was in Paris on a political trip.) Kérékou had served as Maga's aide-de-camp in 1961. According to reports at the scene, soldiers abruptly arrived in the Cabinet room of the presidential palace and started firing bullets, but no one was injured. Kérékou called the triumvirate "truly a monster" as it showed "unpardonable incompetence", amongst other charges which were used to justify the coup. Kouandété was pardoned, although the former council was not. Maga, Ahomadégbé-Tomêtin, and Apithy spent more than nine years in prison before being freed by Kérékou in 1981.

== Later life and death ==
After being released on amnesty, Apithy moved to Paris, where he lived for the rest of his life. He died on 3 December 1989. A few days later, Kérékou proclaimed the end of socialism in Dahomey (renamed Benin in 1975), which he had established in November 1974.

== Bibliography ==
- Carter, Gwendolen Margaret, ed. (1963), "Dahomey", Five African States; Responses to Diversity: the Congo, Dahomey, the Cameroun Federal Republic, the Rhodesias and Nyasaland, South Africa, Ithaca, New York: Cornell University Press, OCLC 413212.
- Danopoulos, Constantine Panos (1988), The Decline of Military Regimes: The Civilian Influence, Boulder, Colorado: Westview Press, ISBN 0-8133-7304-2, OCLC 15162972.
- Decalo, Samuel (December 1970), "Full Circle in Dahomey", African Studies Review, 13 (3), African Studies Association: 445–457, doi:10.2307/523497, JSTOR 523497.
- Decalo, Samuel (April 1973), "Regionalism, Politics, and the Military in Dahomey", The Journal of Developing Areas, 7 (3), College of Business, Tennessee State University: 449–478, JSTOR 4190033.
- Decalo, Samuel (1976), Historical Dictionary of Dahomey (People's Republic of Benin), Metuchen, New Jersey: Scarecrow Press, ISBN 0-8108-0833-1, OCLC 1959674.
- Dossou-Yovo, Noel (September 1999), "The Experience of Benin", International Journal on World Peace, 16 (3), ISSN 0742-3640, OCLC 211426384, archived from the original on 2010-09-16 – via Questia.
- Hudgens, Jim; Trillo, Richard; Calonnec, Nathalie (2003), The Rough Guide to West Africa, London: Rough Guides, ISBN 1-84353-118-6, OCLC 176832097.
- Ihonvbere, Julius Omozuanvbo; Mbaku, John Mukum (2003), Political Liberalization and Democratization in Africa: Lessons from Country Experiences, Westport, Connecticut: Praeger, ISBN 0-313-05151-8, OCLC 60127996.
- Kneib, Martha (2007), Benin, Cultures of the World, Tarrytown, New York: Marshall Cavendish, ISBN 978-0-7614-2328-7, OCLC 62109915.
- Matthews, Ronald (1966), African Powder Keg: Revolt and Dissent in Six Emergent Nations, London: The Bodley Head, OCLC 246401461.
- Ronen, Dov (1975), Dahomey: Between Tradition and Modernity, Ithaca, New York: Cornell University Press, ISBN 0-8014-0927-6, OCLC 1527290.
- Seely, Jennifer C.; Decalo, Samuel (15 April 2021), Historical Dictionary of Togo, Rowman & Littlefield, ISBN 978-1-5381-2278-5
- Staniland, Martin (1973), "The Three-Party System in Dahomey: I, 1946-1956", The Journal of African History, 14 (2), Cambridge University Press: 491–504, doi:10.1017/S0021853700012846, JSTOR 180543.
- Staniland, Martin (1973), "The Three-Party System in Dahomey: II, 1956-1957", The Journal of African History, 14 (3), Cambridge University Press: 291–312, doi:10.1017/S0021853700012573, JSTOR 180450.
- West Africa Publishing Company (1971), West Africa.
- 1st page on the French National Assembly website
- 2nd page on the French National Assembly website
