= People's Republic of Benin =

1975–1990 socialist state in West Africa

Coordinates: 6°30′N 2°36′E

People's Republic of Benin République populaire du Bénin (French)
- 1975–1990
- Flag Coat of arms
- Motto: "Fraternité, Justice, Travail" (French); Fraternity, Justice, Labour
- Anthem: L'Aube nouvelle (French) "The Dawn of a New Day"
- Capital: Porto-Novo
- Common languages: French, Yoruba, Fon
- Religion: State atheism
- Government: Unitary communist state
- President
  - 1975–1990: Mathieu Kérékou
- Legislature: Revolutionary National Assembly
- Historical era: Cold War
  - Military coup: 26 October 1972
  - Republic established: 30 November 1975
  - Democracy restored: 2 December 1990
- Currency: West African CFA franc (XOF)
- Calling code: 229
- ISO 3166 code: BJ
Preceded by	Succeeded by
Republic of Dahomey	Benin

The People's Republic of Benin (French: République populaire du Bénin; sometimes translated literally as the Benin Popular Republic or Popular Republic of Benin) was the Marxist-Leninist Beninese state located in the Gulf of Guinea on the African continent. The People's Republic was established on 30 November 1975, after the 1972 coup d'état led by Marxist and nationalist general Mathieu Kérékou in the Republic of Dahomey. It was governed under a one-party state led by the People’s Revolutionary Party of Benin, which effectively lasted until 1 March 1990, with the adoption of a new constitution, and the abolition of Marxism–Leninism in the nation in 1989.

== History ==
On 26 October 1972, the Armed Forces led by Commander Mathieu Kérékou overthrew the government in a coup d'état, suspended the constitution, and dissolved both the National Assembly and the Presidential Council. On 30 November 1972, it released the keynote address of the New Politics of National Independence. The territorial administration was reformed, mayors and deputies replacing traditional structures (village chiefs, convents, animist priests, etc.). On 30 November 1974, before an assembly of stunned notables in the city of Abomey, he gave a speech proclaiming the formal accession of his government to Marxism–Leninism. His government grew closer to the Soviet Union but sought to maintain good relations with Western countries. The People's Revolutionary Party of Benin, designed as a vanguard party, was created on the same day as the country's only legal party. The first year of the government was marked by purges from the state apparatus. President Kérékou condemned and sometimes executed various representatives of the former political regime. On 30 November 1975, with the first anniversary of the speech of Abomey, Kérékou changed the country's name to Benin, after the Bight of Benin which in turn was named after the Benin Empire that had once flourished in neighboring Nigeria (south-central). The National Day was set for 30 November, referring to the three days of 1972, 1974, and 1975, dubbed by the regime the Three Glorious.

In 1974, under the influence of young revolutionaries – the "Ligueurs" – the government embarked on a socialist program: nationalization of strategic sectors of the economy, reform of the education system, establishment of agricultural cooperatives and new local government structures, and a campaign to eradicate "feudal forces" including tribalism.

=== Attempted coup ===
In January 1977, an attempted coup, called Operation Shrimp, led by the mercenary Bob Denard and supported by France, Gabon, and Morocco failed and hardened the regime, which was officially moving toward the way of a government-political party. The constitution was adopted on 26 August of that year, Article 4 stating:

People's Republic of Benin, the road to development is socialism. Its philosophical basis is Marxism–Leninism to be applied in a lively and creative manner to the realities of Benin. All activities of national social life in the People's Republic of Benin are organized in this way under the leadership of the revolution of Benin, detachment vanguard of the exploited and oppressed masses, leading core of the Beninese people as a whole and its revolution.

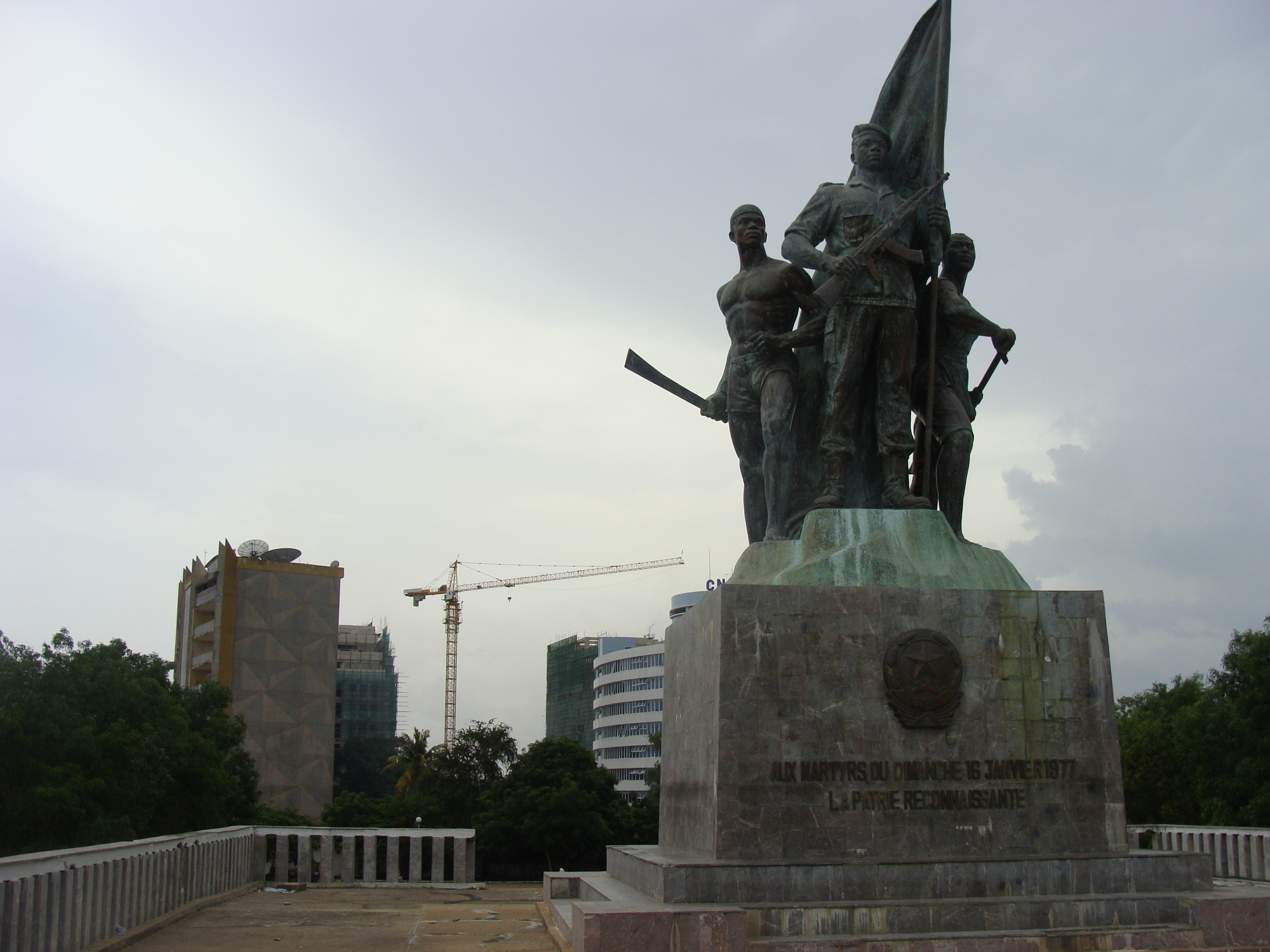
Place des Martyrs (Cotonou): Monument commemorating the victims of the attempted coup of 1977.

A basic law established an all-powerful national assembly.

The opposition was muzzled, and political prisoners remained in detention for years without trial. The elections were held under a system of unique applications. Campaigns were conducted for rural development and improving education. The government also pursued a policy of anti-religious inspiration to root out witchcraft, forces of evil, and retrograde beliefs (West African Vodún, a traditional religion well established in the South, was prohibited, which did not prevent President Kérékou, a few years later, from having his personal marabout, during the period in which he identified as Muslim). Benin received only modest support from other communist states, hosting several teams from cooperating Cuba, East Germany, the Soviet Union, and North Korea.

=== Decline ===
Benin tried to implement extensive programs of economic and social development, but did not get results. Mismanagement and corruption undermined the country's economy. The industrialization strategy by the internal market of Benin caused an escalation of foreign debt. Between 1980 and 1985, the annual service of its external debt rose from 20 to 49 million dollars, while its GNP dropped from 1.402 to 1.024 billion, and the stock of debt exploded from 424 to 817 million. The three former presidents, Hubert Maga, Sourou Migan Apithy, and Justin Ahomadegbe (imprisoned in 1972) were released in 1981.

A new constitution was adopted in 1978, and the first elections for the National Revolutionary Assembly were held in 1979. Kérékou was elected unopposed to a four-year term as president in 1980 and reelected in 1984. The National Revolutionary Assembly was nominally the supreme state organ of power, but in practice did little more than rubber-stamp decisions already made by Kérékou and the PRPB.

In the 1980s, Benin's economic situation became increasingly critical. The country experienced high economic growth rates (15.6 percent in 1982, 4.6 percent in 1983, and 8.2 percent in 1984), but Nigeria's closure of its border with Benin led to a sharp decline in customs and tax revenues. The state was no longer able to pay the salaries of civil servants. Agriculture was disorganized, the Commercial Bank of Benin was ruined, and communities were largely paralyzed due to a lack of budget. On the political front, the violations of human rights, with cases of torture of political prisoners, contributed to social tension: the church and the unions opposed the regime more openly. Plans for the International Monetary Fund (IMF) imposed in 1987 draconian economic measures: a 10% additional levy on wages, hiring freezes, and compulsory retirements. On June 16, 1989, the People's Republic of Benin signed with the IMF a first adjustment plan, in exchange for an enhanced structural adjustment facility (ESAF) of 21.9 million Special Drawing Rights of the IMF. Changes that were promised in the agreement with the IMF included a reduction in public expenditure and tax reform, privatizations, reorganization or liquidation of public enterprises, a policy of liberalization, and the obligation to enter into borrowing at concessional rates. The IMF agreement set off a massive strike of students and staff, requiring the payment of their salaries and their scholarships. On 22 June 1989, the country signed a rescheduling agreement first with the Paris Club, for a total of $199 million, and Benin was granted a 14.1% reduction of its debt.

=== Dissolution ===
The social and political turmoil, catastrophic economic situation, and fall of the communist regimes in Eastern Europe led President Kérékou to agree to bring down his regime. In February 1989, a pastoral letter signed by eleven bishops of Benin expressed their condemnation of the People's Republic. On the 7th of December, 1989, Kérékou took the lead and surprised the people by disseminating an official statement announcing the abandonment of Marxism–Leninism, the liquidation of the Political Bureau, and the closure of the party's central committee. The Government accepted the establishment of a National Conference bringing together representatives of different political movements. The Conference opened on 19 February 1990: Kérékou expressed himself in person on 21 February, publicly recognising the failure of his policy. The work of the Conference decided to draft a new constitution, and the establishment of a democratic process was provided by a provisional government entrusted to a prime minister. Kérékou remained head of state temporarily. Kérékou said on 28 February to the attention of the Conference: "I accept all the conclusions of your work."

A transitional government was set up in 1990, paving the way for the return of a multi-party system. The new constitution was adopted by referendum in December 1990. The official name of Benin was preserved for the country, which became the Republic of Benin. In the presidential election in March 1991, Prime Minister Nicéphore Soglo defeated Kérékou, winning 67.7% of the vote. Kérékou accepted the result and left office. He became president again when he defeated Soglo in the next election in March 1996, having meanwhile dropped all references to Marxism and atheism and having become an evangelical pastor. His return to power involved no recovery of a Marxist–Leninist regime in Benin.

== See also ==
- Cold War § Competition in the Third World
