= Christophe Soglo =

Beninese military officer and politician

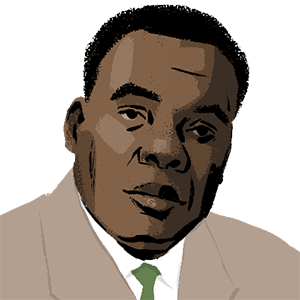
- An illustration of Soglo produced by Voice of America

3rd President of Dahomey
- In office 22 December 1965 – 17 December 1967
- Preceded by: Tahirou Congacou (acting)
- Succeeded by: Jean-Baptiste Hachème

Head of the Provisional Government
- In office 28 October 1963 – 25 January 1964
- Preceded by: Hubert Maga (as President of Dahomey)
- Succeeded by: Sourou-Migan Apithy (as President of Dahomey)

Personal details
- Born: 28 June 1909 Abomey, Dahomey
- Died: 7 October 1983 (aged 74)
- Profession: Military officer

Christophe Soglo (28 June 1909 – 7 October 1983) was a Beninese military officer and political leader.

== Early life ==
Christophe Soglo was born on 28 June 1909 in Abomey, French Dahomey to a chiefly Fon family.

== Military career ==
In 1931, Soglo voluntarily enlisted in the French Army. He fought during World War II, serving in Morocco and participating in the Allies' landings in Corsica, Elba, and southern France. Promoted to the rank of lieutenant, at the end of the war he was made a staff officer for the French Colonial Army. In 1947 he was attached to the French Ministry of Overseas as a military advisor. Securing the rank of captain on 1 January 1950, he was sent to French Indochina and fought in the First Indochina War. He was awarded the Croix de Guerre in 1956 for his service during the war. While there he met a French-Vietnamese woman whom he later married. Following France's defeat in Indochina he was given the rank of major and stationed in Senegal, where he remained until 1960. After Benin achieved independence in 1960, Soglo was given the rank of colonel in the army and became its chief of staff under President Hubert Maga.

== Political career ==
On October 28, 1963, Soglo took control of the country to prevent a civil war. Soglo had previously declared loyalty to Maga's government. He established a provisional government with himself as chairman after dissolving the national assembly. After reorganizing the government, he gave up power on 25 January 1964 and allowed former premier Sourou-Migan Apithy to become president. Soon Apithy and other political leaders began massive feuds over policies. After repeatedly encouraging the various political forces to agree to dialogue, Soglo again overthrew the government on 27 November 1965 and served as President of Benin under a military government until 17 December 1967, when a group of younger army officers overthrew him. Soglo then retired from politics. He died on October 7, 1983, at the age of 74.
