= 2025 in Benin =

- Decades: 2000s; 2010s; 2020s
- See also: Other events of 2025; List of years in Benin

Events in the year 2025 in Benin.

== Incumbents ==
- President – Patrice Talon
- Vice President – Mariam Chabi Talata
- National Assembly President – Louis Vlavonou
- Foreign Affairs Minister: Shegun Adjadi Bakari

== Events ==
Ongoing – Benin–Niger Crisis

- 8 January – Twenty-eight soldiers are killed in a gun attack near the border with Burkina Faso and Niger.
- 30 January – A court in Cotonou convicts businessman Olivier Boko, his brother-in-law Rock Nieri, who is in hiding, and former sports minister Oswald Homeky of plotting a coup against President Patrice Talon and sentences them to 20 years' imprisonment and a fine of 60 billion CFA francs ($95 million).
- 17 April – Fifty-four soldiers are killed in an attack inside W National Park that is claimed by Jama'at Nasr al-Islam wal-Muslimin.
- 2 July – Angélique Kidjo becomes the first black African to be awarded a star on the Hollywood Walk of Fame.
- 15 November – The National Assembly votes 90-19 to approve motions to extend the presidential and legislative terms from five to seven years and establish a senate.
- 7 December – An unsuccessful coup attempt is carried out against President Talon.
- 16 December – US President Donald Trump issues a proclamation imposing partial travel restrictions on Beninese nationals travelling to the United States.

== Holidays ==
- 1 January – New Year's Day
- 10 January – Vaudoun Day
- 30 March – Korité
- 21 April – Easter Monday
- 1 May – Labour Day
- 29 May – Ascension Day
- 6 June – Tabaski
- 9 June – Whit Monday
- 1 August – Independence Day
- 15 August – Assumption Day
- 4 September – The Prophet's Birthday
- 26 October – Armed Forces Day
- 1 November – All Saints' Day
- 30 November – National day
- 25 December – Christmas Day

== Deaths ==
- 19 August – Razak Omotoyossi, 39, Nigerian-born footballer (Sheriff Tiraspol, Helsingborg, Benin national team).

== See also ==
- Telephone numbers in Benin
