= 2023 in Benin =

- Decades: 2000s; 2010s; 2020s
- See also: Other events of 2023; List of years in Benin

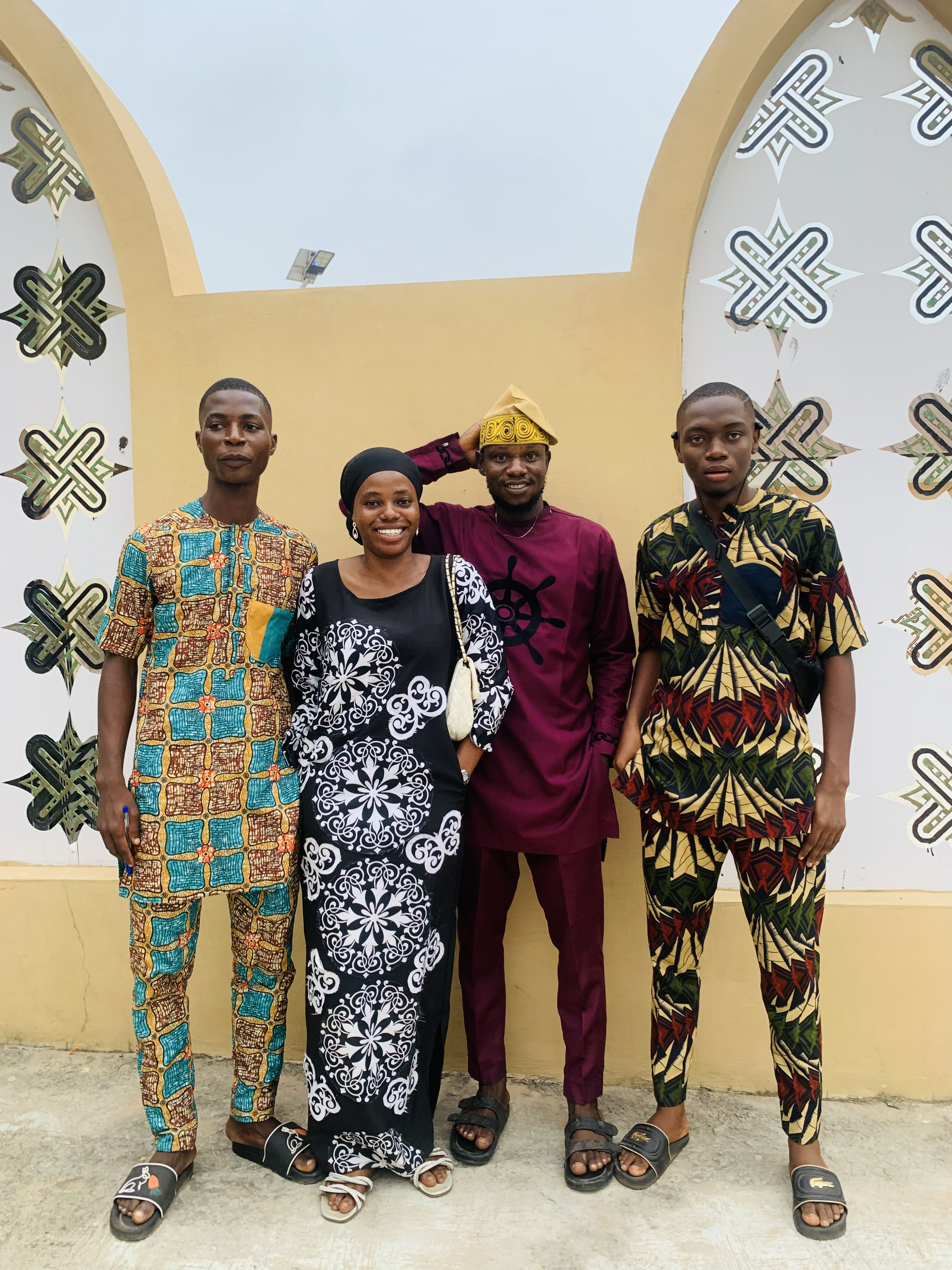
Corps Members at Emir's palace for the Coverage of Gaani Festival in 2023

Events in the year 2023 in Benin.

== Incumbents ==
- President – Patrice Talon
- Vice President – Mariam Chabi Talata
- National Assembly President – Louis Vlavonou
- Foreign Affairs Minister: Aurélien Agbénonci

== Events ==
Ongoing – COVID-19 pandemic in Benin

- 8 January – 2023 Beninese parliamentary election
  - Citizens in Benin elect the 109 members of their National Assembly.
- 29 January – At least 22 people are killed and nearly two dozen are injured after a bus crashes near Dassa-Zoumé, Collines Department.
- 19 June – At least two people were confirmed dead, and many others injured in a stampede during a qualifier game for the 2024 Africa Cup of Nations in Cotonou, Benin.
- 23 September – At least 35 people are killed and 12 are seriously injured after an explosion at an illegal fuel depot in Sèmè-Kpodji, Ouémé Department.
- 12 December – Two soldiers are killed by an improvised explosive device while riding a motorcycle in Karimama, Alibori.

== See also ==
- COVID-19 pandemic in Africa
