= 2024 in Benin =

- Decades: 2000s; 2010s; 2020s
- See also: Other events of 2024; List of years in Benin

Events in the year 2024 in Benin.

== Incumbents ==
- President – Patrice Talon
- Vice President – Mariam Chabi Talata
- National Assembly President – Louis Vlavonou
- Foreign Affairs Minister: Shegun Adjadi Bakari

== Events ==
Ongoing – Benin–Niger Crisis

- 4 June – Seven soldiers are killed in a gun attack inside Pendjari National Park.
- 25–26 July – Five park rangers and seven soldiers are killed in a gun attack inside W National Park.
- 16 September – Two police officers are shot dead by unidentified gunmen in Alibori Department.
- 25 September – Authorities announce the discovery of a coup attempt against President Patrice Talon scheduled on 27 September and led by businessman and Talon ally Olivier Boko. Former sports minister Oswald Homéky and the commander of the Republican Guard are also named as co-conspirators, leading to the arrest of Boko and Homéky.
- 9 October – Benin is elected to a seat at the United Nations Human Rights Council for a three-year term beginning in 2025.

== Holidays ==
- 1 January - New Year's Day
- 10 January - Vaudoun Day
- 1 April - Easter Monday
- 10 April – Korité
- 1 May - Labour Day
- 9 May - Ascension Day
- 20 May - Whit Monday
- 17 June – Tabaski
- 1 August - Independence Day
- 15 August - Assumption Day
- 15 September – The Prophet's Birthday
- 26 October – Armed Forces Day
- 1 November - All Saints' Day
- 30 November - National day
- 25 December - Christmas Day

== Deaths ==
- 1 February – Paulin J. Hountondji, 81, philosopher.
- 2 July – Saturnin Soglo, politician, minister of foreign affairs (1992–1993).

== See also ==
- Telephone numbers in Benin
