= 2022 in Benin =

- Decades: 2000s; 2010s; 2020s
- See also: Other events of 2022; List of years in Benin

Events in the year 2022 in Benin.

== Incumbents ==
- President – Patrice Talon
- Vice President – Mariam Chabi Talata
- National Assembly President – Louis Vlavonou
- Foreign Affairs Minister: Aurélien Agbénonci

== Events ==
Ongoing – COVID-19 pandemic in Benin

=== February ===
- 8 February – Armed terrorists attack W National Park in the North of Benin. Of the eight people killed, five were park rangers, one was their French instructor, another a soldier, and the last an official. Ten people were injured.
- 10 February – Another African Parks official is killed after their vehicle hits a bomb planted by terrorists.

=== April ===
- 12 April – Five soldiers are killed and several wounded when the army convoy struck an explosive device placed by suspected Islamist militants in Pendjari National Park, according to two military sources.
- 22 April – The International Monetary Fund (IMF) reaches a staff-level agreement on a new 42-month extended credit facility worth $658 million, according to the IMF.
- 26 April
  - At least one police officer is killed and several wounded in an attack on Monsey police station in Karimama. This attack is part of the spillover of militant activity from neighbouring Burkina Faso and Niger, according to two police sources.
  - The Ministry of Islamic Affairs, Dawah and Guidance of Saudi Arabia begins implementing an iftar program, targeted 24,000 beneficiaries.
- 27 April – Dutch impact investor Oikocredit invests $1.4 million in solar mini-grid provider Weziza to implement a long-awaited rural electrification project.

== Deaths ==
- 15 February – Vivi l'internationale, singer (b. 1946)
- 2 March – Moussa Okanla, scholar and diplomat (b. 1950)
- 29 May – Osayuki Godwin Oshodin, academic administrator (b. 1950)
- 17 December – Soumanou Oke, military officer (b. 1955)

== See also ==
- COVID-19 pandemic in Africa
- 2022 in West Africa
