= 2026 in Benin =

- Decades: 2000s; 2010s; 2020s
- See also: Other events of 2026; List of years in Benin

Events in the year 2026 in Benin.

== Incumbents ==
- President – Patrice Talon (until 24 May); Romuald Wadagni (since 24 May)
- Vice President – Mariam Chabi Talata

== Events ==
=== Ongoing ===
- Benin–Niger Crisis

=== January ===
- 11 January – 2026 Beninese parliamentary election: The pro-Talon Progressive Union Renewal and Republican Bloc parties win all 109 seats in the National Assembly.

=== February ===
- 6–22 February – Benin at the 2026 Winter Olympics

=== March ===
- 4 March – Fifteen soldiers are killed in a JNIM attack on a military camp in Kofouno.

=== April ===
- 12 April – 2026 Beninese presidential election: Finance minister Romuald Wadagni is elected president with over 94% of the vote.

=== May ===
- 9 May – The opposition Cowry Forces for an Emerging Benin joins the ruling coalition.
- 24 May – Romuald Wadagni is inaugurated as president.

== Holidays ==
- 1 January – New Year's Day
- 10 January – Vaudoun Day
- 20 March – Korité
- 6 April – Easter Monday
- 1 May – Labour Day
- 14 May – Ascension Day
- 25 May – Whit Monday
- 27 May – Tabaski
- 1 August – Independence Day
- 15 August – Assumption Day
- 25 August – The Prophet's Birthday
- 26 October – Armed Forces Day
- 1 November – All Saints' Day
- 30 November – National day
- 25 December – Christmas Day

== Deaths ==
- 22 August – Séfou Fagbohoun, 80, oil industry executive, MP (1991–1995, 2007–2015).
- 24 August – Grégoire Laourou, 73, politician, minister of finance (2002–2005).
- 29 September – Colette Sénami Agossou Houeto, 87, educator, feminist poet and politician.
