= 2021 in Benin =

- Decades: 2000s; 2010s; 2020s
- See also: Other events of 2021; List of years in Benin

== Incumbents ==
President of Benin: Patrice Talon

== Events ==
Ongoing – COVID-19 pandemic in Benin

- 5 February – Twenty people, including incumbent President Patrice Talon, enroll as candidates in the 2021 Beninese presidential election. Talon's running mate, Mariam Chabi Talata, would be Benin′s first female vice president if elected.
- 1-2 December - Porga attack

== Scheduled events ==
- 11 April – 2021 Beninese presidential election

== See also ==
- 2021 in West Africa
