= 2019 in Benin =

- Decades: 1990s; 2000s; 2010s; 2020s
- See also: Other events of 2019; List of years in Benin

Events in the year 2019 in Benin.

== Incumbents ==
- President: Patrice Talon
- President of the National Assembly: Adrien Houngbédji (until 18 May); Louis Vlavonou (from 18 May)

== Events ==
- 26 February–4 July – 2019 Benin protests
- 28 April – 2019 Beninese parliamentary election

== Deaths ==
- 21 March – Paul Kouassivi Vieira, Roman Catholic prelate (b. 1949).
- 22 October – Bachirou Osséni, footballer (b. 1985).
- 6 November – Albert Tévoédjrè, writer and politician (b. 1929).
- 12 November – Basile Adjou Moumouni, physician (b. 1922).
