= Corinne Amori Brunet =

Franco-Beninese diplomat and politician

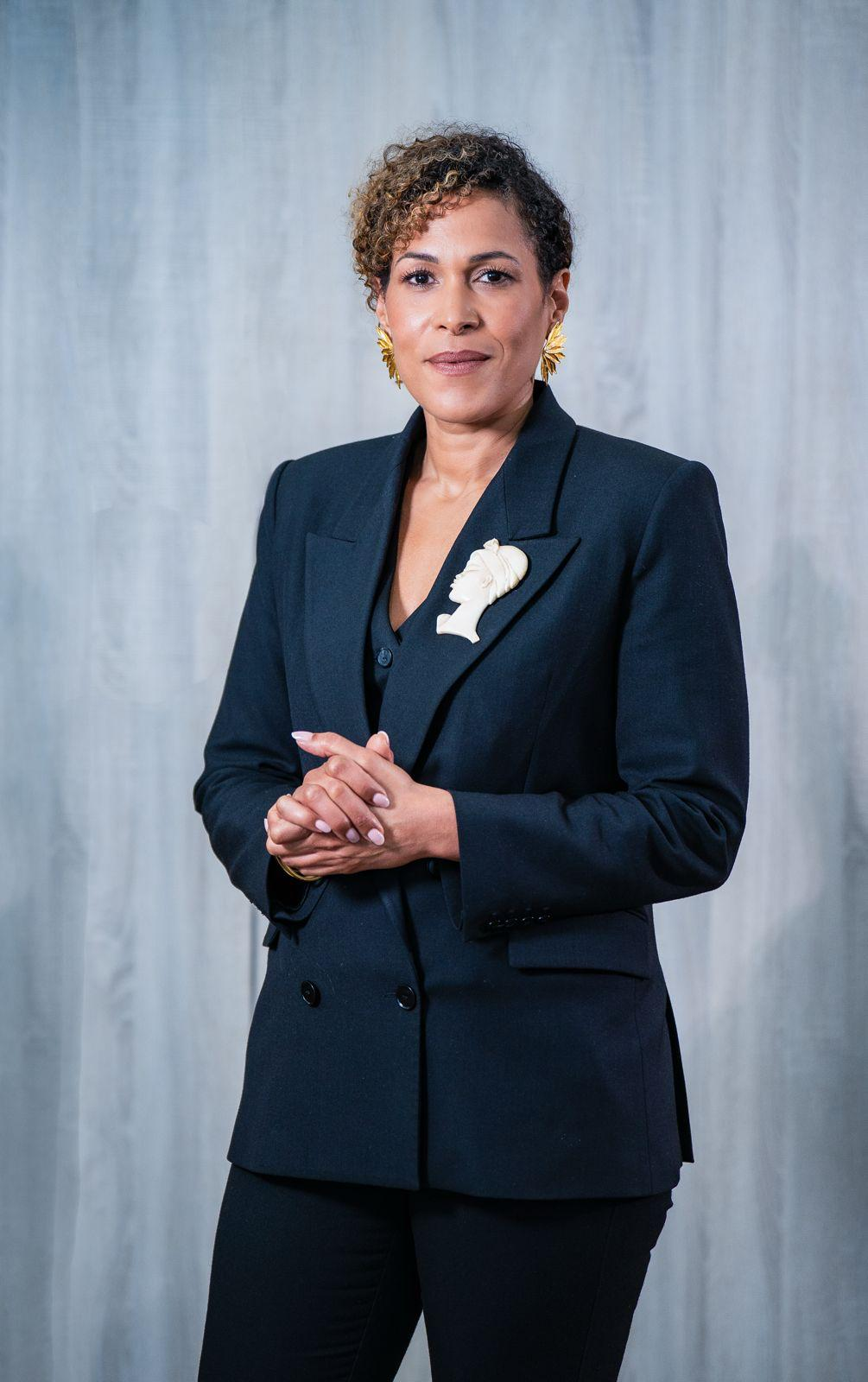
- Corinne Amori Brunet

Minister of Foreign Affairs
- Incumbent
- Assumed office 24 May 2026
- President: Romuald Wadagni
- Preceded by: Shegun Adjadi Bakari

Ambassador of Benin to France
- In office 12 July 2023 – 24 May 2026
- President: Patrice Talon
- Preceded by: Eusèbe Agbangla

Personal details
- Born: Corinne Amori Brunet Abidjan, Ivory Coast
- Education: Paris-East Créteil University

Corinne Amori Brunet is a Franco-Beninese diplomat and politician. A recipient of the French-American Foundation's Young Leaders program in 2021, she was the first female ambassador of Benin to France. She was appointed Minister of Foreign Affairs of Benin on 24 May 2026.

== Biography ==
=== Origins and education ===
She was born in Abidjan, Ivory Coast, to a Beninese mother and a French father, Jean-Pierre Brunet. After graduating from the Aristide-Briand high school in Évreux in 2002, she obtained her master's degree in international business management from INSEEC London-Paris and a bachelor's degree in administration and international trade from Paris-East Créteil University.

=== Professional and political career ===
She served as Director of Strategy and Development at Novethic from 2017 to 2022. In 2021, she was a recipient of the Young Leaders Award from the French-American Foundation for her approaches to the rule of law, sustainable development, and economic development. On 12 July 2023, she became the first female ambassador of Benin to France.

On 24 May 2026, President Romuald Wadagni appointed her Minister of Foreign Affairs of Benin. She replaced Shegun Adjadi Bakari, who was appointed Minister of Tourism and Foreign Trade.
