= 2020 in Benin =

- Decades: 2000s; 2010s; 2020s
- See also: Other events of 2020; List of years in Benin

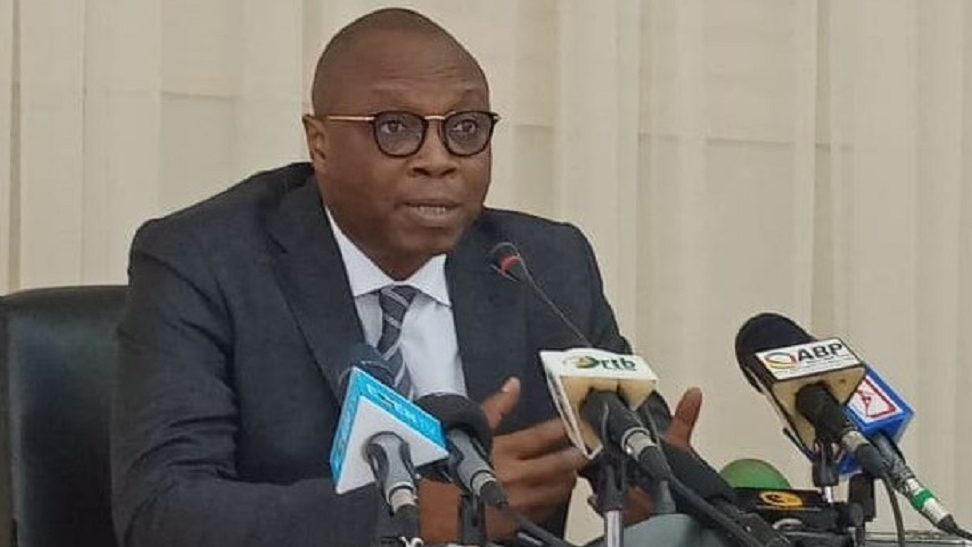
Alain Orounla, Benin minister 2020

== Incumbents ==
- President: Patrice Talon

== Events ==
- 16 March - 1st case of the COVID-19 pandemic in Benin
- 19 March - 2nd case
