= Senate (Benin) =

Senate of Benin

Senate Sénat

Type
- Type: Upper house

History
- Founded: 30 July 2026

Leadership
- President: Patrice Talon, Independent since 6 August 2026

Structure
- Seats: 25
- Political groups: Senate (25): Appointed members (14); Statutory members (11)
- Length of term: 7 years

The Senate (French: Sénat) is Benin's legislative upper house, marking the transition to a bicameral parliament alongside the lower house National Assembly since 30 July 2026. The senate has 25 members, 14 who are directly appointed by the President and 11 statutory members.

The senate is able to request a second reading of legislation and veto constitutional, electoral or political party reforms it considers a threat to democracy, peace or national unity. It is also able to suspend or revoke the political rights of public figures whose conduct is judged as a threat to the country’s institutions or social cohesion.

== History ==
The first parliament of an independent Benin was defined by the Constitution of 28 February 1959 and lasted from April 1959 to November 1960. It was chaired by Justin Ahomadegbé Tomètin. With a 1960 and a 1964 constitution, two new National Assemblies were enacted each time. The implementation of the Basic Law of 9 September 1977 radically altered the parliament. It was renamed the Revolutionary National Assembly (ANR) and lasted until February 1990. The High Council of the Republic was formed in February 1990 to democratize the country and was chaired by Archbishop Isidore de Souza. A new constitution was passed on 11 December 1990 which formed the basic structure of the former unicameral national assembly. The Senate was established under a constitutional reform adopted on 18 November 2025 passed by a 90-19 vote in the National Assembly. The government of then president Patrice Talon said the reform was aimed at strengthening political stability, national unity and the functioning of state institutions, leading to Benin’s transition to a bicameral parliament.

=== First inaugural session ===
The senate was sworn in on 30 July 2026. Talon was elected as the president of Senate in its first inaugural session on 6 august 2026, securing 24 out of 25 votes, and marking a return to the centre of national politics only months after leaving the presidency.

== Criticism ==
Critics have questioned whether the limited number of opposition figures could turn it into a rubber-stamp chamber. However former president Boni Yayi decided to take his seat in the Senate in July 2026 despite previously rejecting the institution established through the December 2025 constitutional reform. Explaining his reversal, Boni Yayi said that serving in the Senate would provide an important forum for political consultation, constructive dialogue, and representing citizens’ interests in a legislature dominated by a single political party.

Former Democrats MP Sika Ouassagari expressed concern that the senate could wield significant powers with limited democratic accountability. He questioned whether such broad authority could undermine political alternation and concentrate institutional power rather than strengthen Benin’s democratic checks and balances. At the same time law professor and former secretary-general of the Constitutional Court, Gilles Badet believes "The senate as the second chamber of the Beninese Parliament provides a mechanism for quality control over the work carried out by the National Assembly."

== Electoral system ==
The senate is made up of 25 members with 14 being directly appointed by the President and the other 11 being statutory members. This group consists of former presidents, former National Assembly speakers and former presidents of the Constitutional Court. Eligibility for the positions of senate president and vice-president is limited exclusively to the institution’s 11 statutory members.

== See also ==
- History of Benin
- President of the Senate
- List of legislatures by country
- Politics of Benin
