= 2018 in Benin =

- Decades: 1990s; 2000s; 2010s; 2020s
- See also: Other events of 2018; List of years in Benin

Events in the year 2018 in Benin.

== Incumbents ==
- President: Patrice Talon
- President of the National Assembly: Adrien Houngbédji

== Deaths ==
- 4 January – Rafiatou Karimou, politician and teacher (b. 1946).
