= 2017 in Benin =

- Decades: 1990s; 2000s; 2010s; 2020s
- See also: Other events of 2017; List of years in Benin

This articles lists events from the year 2017 in Benin.

== Incumbents ==
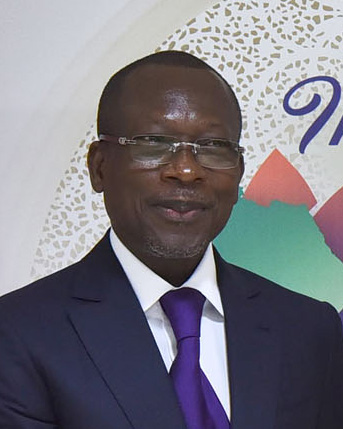
Patrice Talon

- President: Patrice Talon
- President of the National Assembly: Adrien Houngbédji

== Events ==
=== Economic conditions ===
Benin's overall macroeconomic conditions were positive in 2017, with a growth rate of around 5.6 percent. Economic growth was largely driven by Benin's cotton industry and other cash crops, the Port of Cotonou, and telecommunications. Cashew and pineapple production and processing have substantial commercial potential. The country's primary source of revenue is the Port of Cotonou, although the government is seeking to expand its revenue base. In 2017, Benin imported about $2.8 billion in goods such as rice, meat and poultry, alcoholic beverages, fuel plastic materials, specialized mining and excavating machinery, telecommunications equipment, passenger vehicles, and toiletries and cosmetics. Principal exports are ginned cotton, cotton cake and cotton seeds, cashew, shea butter, cooking oil, and lumber.

== Links ==
Media related to 2017 in Benin at Wikimedia Commons
