= 2021 Beninese presidential election =

Re-election of Patrice Talon

- 11 April 2021
- Registered: 4,802,303
- Turnout: 50.63%
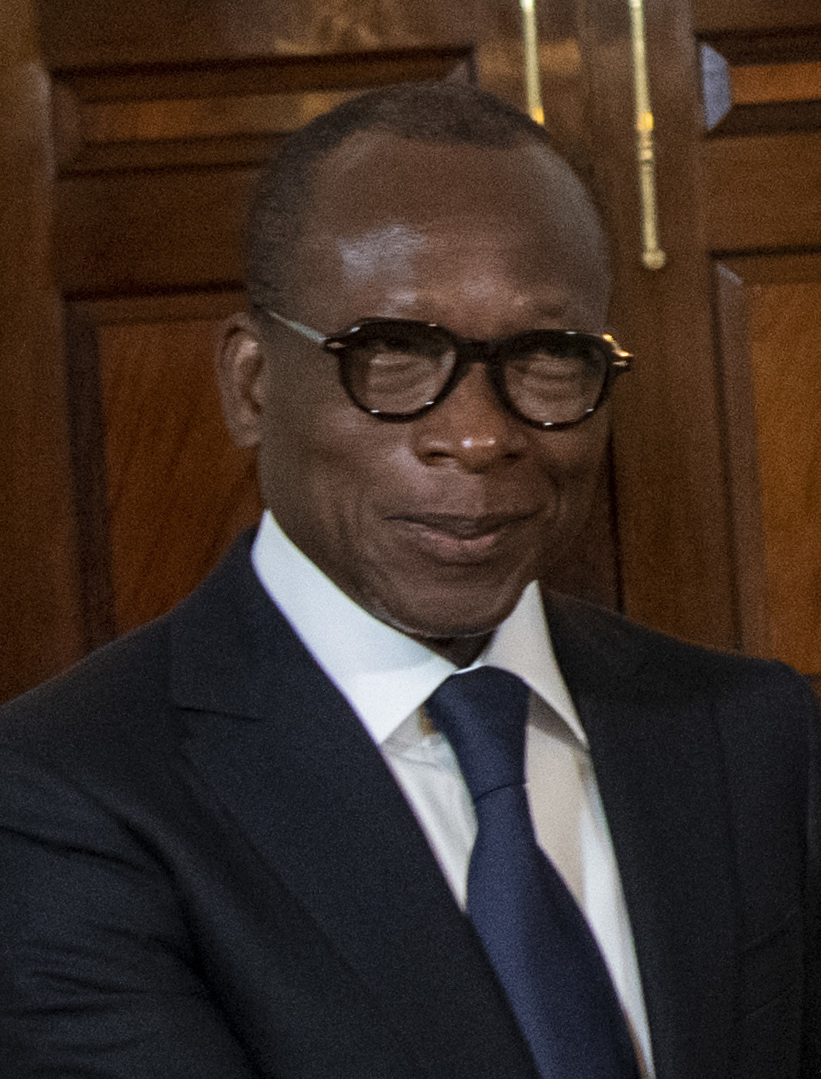

Nominee	Patrice Talon	Alassane Soumanou
Party	Independent	FCBE
Running mate	Mariam Chabi Talata	Paul Hounkpe
Popular vote	1,982,534	261,096
Percentage	86.30%	11.37%
President before election
Patrice Talon
Independent
Elected President
Patrice Talon
Independent

Presidential elections were held in Benin on 11 April 2021 to elect the President of the Republic of Benin for a five-year term. Incumbent president Patrice Talon was re-elected for a second term in office with 86% of the vote.

== Background ==
The 2016 presidential elections saw the election of Patrice Talon, who won in the second round of voting with nearly double the number of votes than his opponent Lionel Zinsou, Prime Minister running under outgoing president Thomas Boni Yayi's Cowry Forces for an Emerging Benin party. Benin has a reputation for being a stable democracy on the African continent.

Upon becoming president, Talon undertook swift economic reforms aimed at liberalization. This provoked protests and strikes in the country and later led to the government tightening regulations on public protests, which led to accusations of authoritarianism. In parallel, the president has attempted to combat corruption in the country. During the presidential campaign, Talon highlighted good governance as one of his key themes, including the introduction of a single presidential term, which he called a "moral requirement". However, this reform was blocked by Parliament, who refused to create the precedent that a president could modify the constitutional terms of his mandate.

=== Political crisis ===
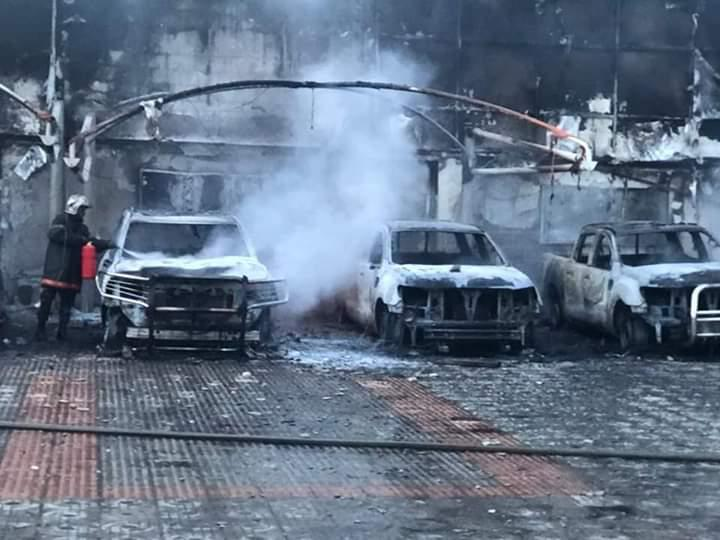
Burnt vehicles in Cotonou, 1 May 2019

The approval and reputation of President Talon were seriously damaged in the wake of the 2019 parliamentary elections, which saw the government democratically backslide by drastically restricting the eligibility of political parties, with only two pro-government parties able to run, excluding any opposition parties. The center-left Progressive Union and the centrist Republican Bloc, the two pro-government parties created for the election, won all the seats in parliament, meaning no opposition movements would have a direct voice in legislative matters. Opposition parties called for a boycott of the election, which led to a record low 23% voter turnout, down from 65% in the previous election.

The opposition again accused the president of authoritarianism and called for an end to the vote-counting process and the organization of new elections without success. Two days after the election, Amnesty International released a statement denouncing "the wave of arbitrary arrests of political activists and journalists and the repression of peaceful protests". The election was also marked by a complete Internet shutdown on the day of the vote, an action criticized by the opposition, civil society and international observers, the level of repression on the part of the government was described as "alarming". The days following the election involved violent clashes between protesters and security forces, with the latter firing tear gas and live ammunition, while protesters burning tires and throwing various objects. Amnesty International denounced the death of four protesters as well as continued arbitrary arrests, which led to the serious injury of another protester. A strong security contingent was deployed on the streets of Cotonou and Porto-Novo leading up to the investiture ceremony for the new Assembly. Para Commandos, anti-riot vehicles, the CRS and units of the Republican Guard were all deployed to maintain order.

Nevertheless, a six-month political dialogue process led to an agreement on rules regarding electoral participation. During the 2020 municipal elections, only five political parties were validated by the central election authority, down from 34 parties and alliances in the 2015 municipal elections. The Cowry Forces for an Emerging Benin was the only opposition party to exceed the 10% vote threshold needed for representation. This has led to some international observers questioning the strength of democracy in the country, which had previously been considered one of the more stable in Africa, due to an increasing restrictive and authoritarian bent, a loss of political pluralism, and key political rivals of President Talon either in exile or excluded from political participation.

=== Preparation for the 2021 elections ===
As the 2021 elections approached, the incumbent president was seen as theoretically the only person able to run as a candidate. A 2019 revision to the constitution imposed a requirement that candidates need receive the nomination of 10% of the total MPs and mayors (about 16 sponsors). However, 160 of the electoral officials (83 Members of Parliament and 77 mayors) concerned belong to pro-government parties. Only six mayors belonging to the Cowry Forces for an Emerging Benin make up the opposition, with the party lacking a Member of Parliament. President Talon promised to "do everything" to organize an inclusive, open ballot for his opponents to obtain nomination, a move seen by opposition parties as the president's way to "cherry pick" his challengers. The Cowry Forces for an Emerging Benin, as well as the Democrats (a new party created by supporters of former president Boni Yayi) fear they will be designated as trojan horses by President Talon. The leader of the Democrats, Reckya Madougou, was arrested on 3 March 2021 and charged with "financing terrorism".

=== Protests ===
In April 2021 protests occurred in several Beninese cities in light of Talon's decision to stand for re-election after initially stating he would only serve for one term. Demonstrations were noted to have occurred in the commercial capital, Cotonou, as well as the city of Parakou in the centre of the country. On 8 April 2021 it was reported that two protestors had been shot dead and five more injured by security forces in Savè.

== Electoral system ==
The president of Benin is elected by a two-round system to a five-year term that is renewable once. If no candidate receives a majority of the vote in the first round, the top-two candidates compete in a second round organized within fifteen days of the first round. After a constitutional amendment adopted in November 2019, each presidential candidate has to designate a vice-presidential running mate. The vice president also has a five-year term and is charged with completing the president's term in case of impeachment or other impediment.

Candidates for the presidency have to be a Beninese citizen, either by birth or from having lived in Benin for the past ten years, be of "good character and great probity", have all their civil and political rights, be between the ages of 40 and 70, and submit to a physical and mental assessment by three doctors sworn in by the Constitutional Court. A 2019 constitutional amendment also requires candidates to be nominated by no less than 10% of the total of Members of Parliament and Mayors, or about 16 officials.

== Candidates ==
Candidates have until 4 February to obtain the nominations necessary and announce their candidacy. Twenty people, including incumbent President Patrice Talon, enrolled as candidates.

Law professor Frédéric Joël Aïvo was the first to declare his candidacy. Several opposition leaders have supported a coalition backing Aïvo. President Talon announced his intention to run for another term on 15 January 2021, breaking his 2016 promise to run for one term. The next week, Talon revealed his running-mate, Vice President of the Assembly Mariam Chabi Talata. The choice came as a surprise to observers, as Talata was not one of the names advanced by the pro-government parties and the president chose an alternative when the two parties were unable to agree. Talata would be Benin's first female vice president if elected.

== Results ==
Provisional results from the Autonomous National Electoral Commission (CENA) were released on 13 April showing that incumbent president Patrice Talon was re-elected with 86.4% of the vote. Provisional results from the Constitutional Court on 15 April showed Talon winning with 87.3% of the vote. The final results were certified by the Constitutional Court on 20 April.

Candidate	Running mate	Party	Votes	%
Patrice Talon	Mariam Chabi Talata	Independent	1,982,534	86.30
Alassane Soumanou	Paul Hounkpe	Cowry Forces for an Emerging Benin	261,096	11.37
Corentin Kohoue	Irénée Agossa	The Democrats	53,685	2.34
Total			2,297,315	100.00
Valid votes			2,297,315	94.48
Invalid/blank votes			134,099	5.52
Total votes			2,431,414	100.00
Registered voters/turnout			4,802,303	50.63
Source: Constitutional Court, Constitutional Court
