= 2006 in Benin =

- Decades: 1980s; 1990s; 2000s; 2010s; 2020s
- See also: Other events of 2006; List of years in Benin

The following lists events that happened during 2006 in Benin.

== Incumbents ==
- President: Mathieu Kérékou (until 6 April), Thomas Boni Yayi (starting 6 April)

== Events ==
=== March ===
- March 5 - In the 2006 Beninese presidential election, Thomas Boni Yayi is elected for a first term.
