= President of the Senate (Benin) =

Head of the Senate (Benin)

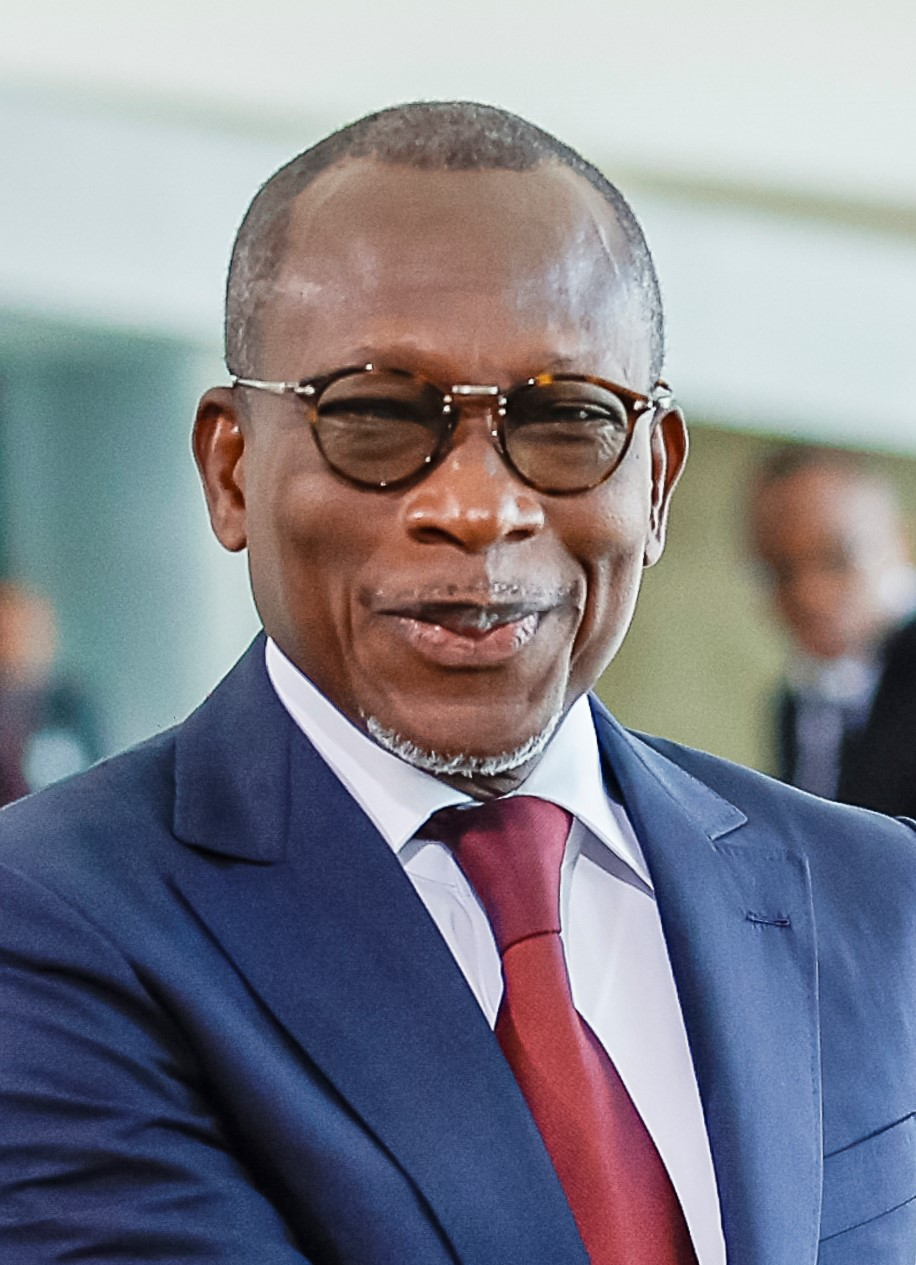
- Incumbent; Patrice Talon since 6 August 2026
- Style: Mr. President
- Residence: Porto-Novo
- Formation: 29 July 2026
- First holder: Patrice Talon

The President of the Senate (French: Président du Sénat) presides over the Senate, the upper house of the parliament of Benin. Former president Patrice Talon has served as president of the Senate since 6 August, shortly after the office's creation.

The senate is made up of 25 members with 14 being directly appointed by the President and the other 11 being statutory members. This group consists of former presidents, former National Assembly speakers and former presidents of the Constitutional Court who are all members of the senate. Eligibility for the positions of senate president and vice-president is limited exclusively to the institution’s 11 statutory members. The senate is chaired by the senate president in the capital Porto-Novo.

== List of Presidents of the Senate ==
Below is a list of presidents of the Senate:

Name	Entered office	Left office	Notes
Patrice Talon	6 August 2026	In office	

== See also ==
- Senate
