= 2019 Benin protests =

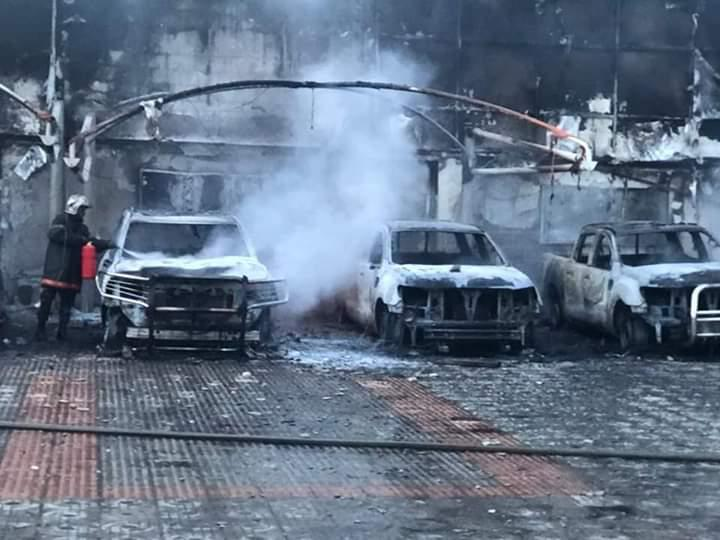
- Protesters burn cars during protests in Cotonou against results of election, 1 May 2019
- Date: February 26, 2019 – July 4, 2019
- Location: Benin
- Caused by: Results of the 2019 Beninese parliamentary election; Opposition banned from participating
- Goals: Resignation of Patrice Talon and free elections; Reverse of electoral law; Fresh general elections
- Methods: Demonstrations, Riots
- Result: Protests suppressed by force

The 2019 Benin protests was a widespread popular uprising and post-election conflict after the opposition was barred from running in the 2019 Beninese parliamentary election in Benin.

== Background ==
Pre-elections (February–April), demonstrators called for the scrap of a new electoral law, however, a violent crackdown quashed the protests easily. On 1 May, the results of the elections was announced, leading to small protests and rallies in Cotonou that evening.

== Protests ==
Tensions simmered when protests turned into riots after demonstrators came in their tens of thousands nationwide, throwing stones at tanks and the armed forces, who responded with Rubber bullets, Water cannon and Live ammunition in Cotonou, Porto-Novo and Parakou, the three largest cities. 2 were killed over the next 10 days of violent protests. After the president Patrice Talon condemned protesters and the popular uprising, saying it will plunge the country into war, thousands took to the streets in June, the result, Police opened fire wounding several.

Due to the lack of safety during demonstrations, protesters marches ended without notice.

== Gallery ==
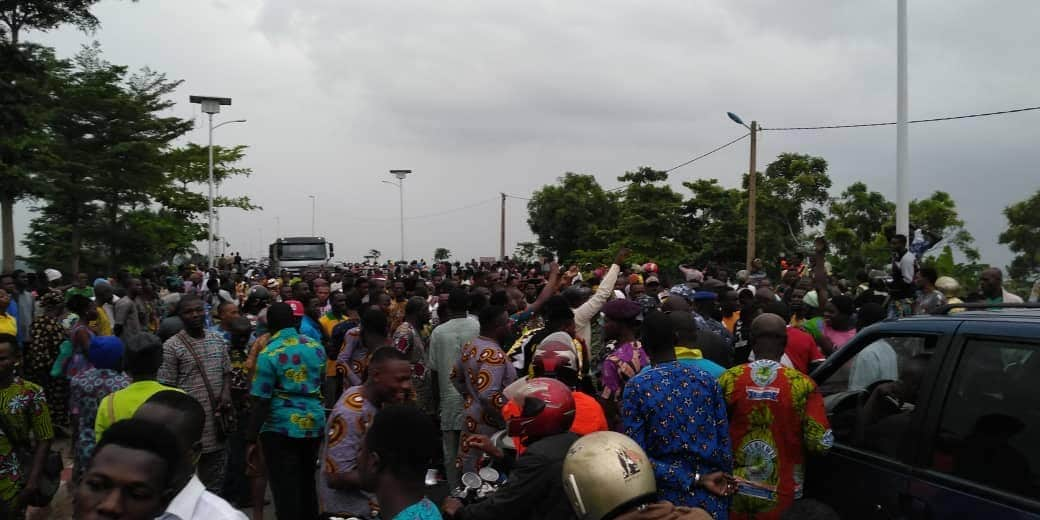
Protesters march on Port-Novo bridge on 25 February

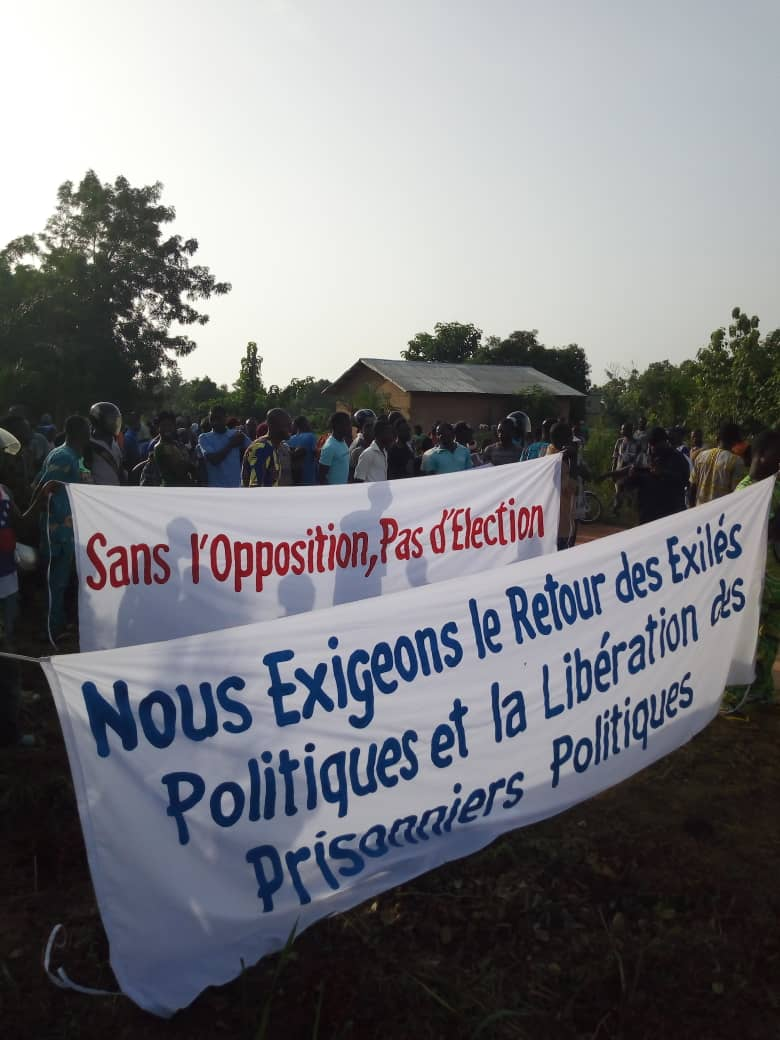
Protesters march in Cotonou calling for free elections

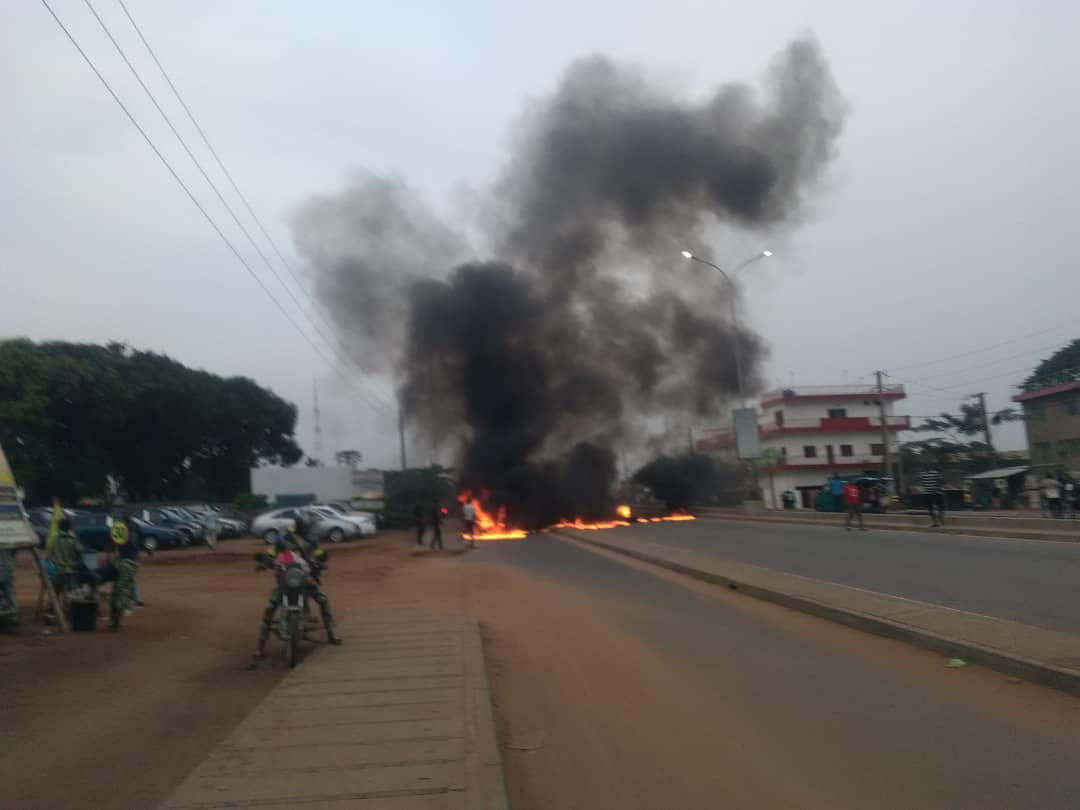
Barricades made as tires burn in protests

== See also ==
- 2019 Gabonese protests
