= Reckya Madougou =

Beninese politician (born 1974)

Reckya Madougou (born 30 April 1974) is a Beninese politician. She served in the Boni Yayi cabinet twice: first as Minister of Microfinance, Youth and Women's Employment; and then as Minister of Justice.

== Early life ==
Madougou was born on 30 April 1974. In elementary school, she was interested in scouting. As an adult, she joined the Benin chapter of Jeune Chambre Internationale (JCI), eventually becoming a vice president.

Madougou graduated from the Institut National d'Economie (now the Ecole Nationale d'Economie appliquée et de Management) in Benin in 1997. She received a diploma in Commercial Engineering from ISG Lille in 1998, then a Doctorate in International Business from the Institute of Higher International Studies in 2000. She was chosen to represent Benin in the 2007 International Visitor Leadership Program.

== Career ==
Madougou started her professional career by participating in the development of the Nasuba telecom LC 2 International project. She then entered the Sales and Marketing department of the mobile operator GSM BB Com. She later became the Director of Sales and Marketing at Tunde Motors, holder of the Volkswagen manufacturing license for Benin. In 2006, she founded her own research and strategy consulting firm, International Key Consulting.

=== Political involvement ===
Madougou initiated and led the civil society campaign "Don't touch my Constitution" (French: Touche pas à ma Constitution) in Benin from 2004 to 2006, which inspired similar campaigns in Senegal, Burkina Faso and Cameroon.

Madougou served in the Cabinet from 2008 to 2013. Her first appointment was as Minister of Microfinance, Youth and Women's Employment. The programs she began helped over two million beneficiaries, mostly women, youths, small entrepreneurs, and farmers. She then became Minister of Justice. After leaving the Cabinet, she became a Special Advisor to the government of Togo.

As head of the political party Les Démocrates, Madougou declared her intention to contest the presidential election on 11 April 2021; however, her candidacy was rejected as she did not have 16 signatures from supporting mayors or MPs. She was arrested on 3 March 2021 during a meeting with another opposition politician in Porto-Novo. A government spokesman accused her of "planning to assassinate several political figures", but did not announce a trial date. On 4 April 2021, a Beninese judge who had gone into exile told Radio France Internationale that Madougou's arrest was solely political.

On 9 July 2021, Reckya Madougou's lawyers filed a request for the provisional release of their client with the prosecutor of the Court for the Repression of Economic Offenses and Terrorism.

== Prison sentence ==
On 11 December 2021, Madougou was found guilty of "complicity in terrorist acts" by the Economic Crime and Terrorism Court in the capital Porto-Novo and sentenced to 20 years in prison.

== Publications ==
- Soigner les certitudes (with Stephens Akplogan). Éditions Jean-Jacques Wuillaume, 2020.
- Mon combat pour la parole : les défis d'une mobilisation citoyenne pour la promotion de la gouvernance démocratique. L'Harmattan, 2008.
