= List of years in Benin =

This is a list of years in Benin. For only articles about years in Benin that have been written, see Category:Years in Benin.

== 18th century ==
1700s · 1710s · 1720s · 1730s · 1740s · 1750s · 1760s · 1770s · 1780s · 1790s

== 19th century ==
1800s · 1810s · 1820s · 1830s · 1840s · 1850s · 1860s · 1870s · 1880s · 1890s

== 20th century ==
1900s · 1910s · 1920s · 1930s · 1940s · 1950s · 1960s · 1970s · 1980s · 1990s

== 21st century ==
2000s
2000
2001
2002
2003
2004
2005
2006
2007
2008
2009

2010s
2010
2011
2012
2013
2014
2015
2016
2017
2018
2019

2020s
2020
2021
2022
2023
2024
2025
2026
2027
2028
2029
