= 2019 Gabonese protests =

Student protests in Gabon

The 2019 Gabonese protests were mass demonstrations and strike movements by teachers, university students and workers at schools in Gabon against new laws, mainly a new scholarship reform and university grants. Weeks of student protests hit the country, mainly bloodless and largely nonviolent. Massive street protests against further reforms spread to major cities surrounding the capital, Libreville. Protesters marched in April 2019, leading to protest rallies and inspiration of student protests in other cities. In response to the mass protest movement and wave of strike unrest, the government of Ali Bongo Ondimba withdrew from the law, shuttered schools and universities amid strikes.

== See also ==
- 2016 Gabonese protests
- 2011 Gabonese protests
