= Politics of Benin =

The Politics of Benin formally take place in the framework of a presidential representative democratic republic, where in the President of Benin is both head of state and head of government, and of a multi-party system. Executive power is exercised by the government. Legislative power is vested in both the government and the legislature. Formally, the Judiciary is independent of the executive and the legislature. The current political system is derived from the 1990 Constitution of Benin and the subsequent transition to democracy in 1991.

The first multi-party elections took place in Benin in 1991. From 1991 to 2016, Benin was among Sub-Saharan Africa's most stable democracies. With President Patrice Talon taking office in 2016, Benin has experienced democratic backsliding as Talon has consolidated power and used the judiciary to repress the political opposition. The Economist Intelligence Unit rated Benin a "hybrid regime" in 2022.

== Development of political system ==
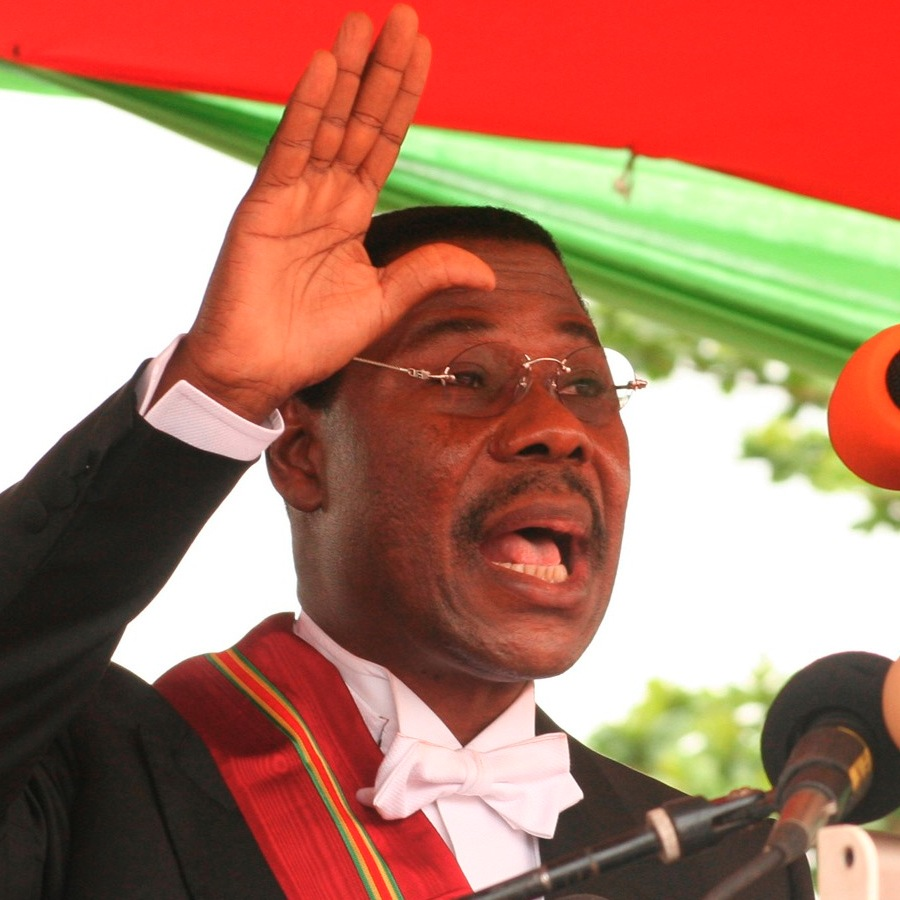
The President of Benin from 2006 to 2016, Yayi Boni

From the 17th century until the colonial period, the Kingdom of Dahomey (whose borders encompassed more than present day Benin) was ruled by an "Oba". The French were the colonial power from 1892 to 1960, when independence was finally achieved. Between 1960 and 1972, a series of military coups in Benin (known until 1975 as the Republic of Dahomey) brought about many changes of government. The last of these brought Major Mathieu Kérékou to power as the head of a regime professing strict Marxist-Leninist principles. The Revolutionary Party of the People of Benin (PRPB) remained in complete power until the beginning of the 1990s. Kérékou, encouraged by France and other democratic powers, convened a National Conference that introduced a new democratic constitution and held presidential and legislative elections. Kérékou's principal opponent at the presidential poll, and the ultimate victor, was Prime Minister Nicéphore Soglo. Supporters of Soglo also secured a majority in the National Assembly.

Thus, Benin was the first African country to successfully complete the transition from dictatorship to a pluralistic political system. In the second round of National Assembly elections held in March 1995, Soglo's political vehicle, the Parti de la Renaissance du Benin, was the largest single party, but it lacked an overall majority. The success of a party formed by supporters of ex-president Kérékou, who had officially retired from active politics, encouraged him to stand successfully at both the 1996 and 2001 presidential elections.

== Constitution ==
Spurred in part by the collapse of the Soviet Union and the resultant lack of donor support from the superpower, as well as an economic crisis within the country, Benin adopted a new constitution in 1990 in order to open up and liberalise the political system and economy. Its chief aims are to enshrine in law accountability, transparency, freedom of religion, freedom of the press, separation of governmental powers, the right to strike, universal suffrage (at age 18) and independence of the judiciary

These developments have created economic growth in Benin, but some of the bold ideals of the constitution have yet to be fully realised. Lack of accountability and transparency, failure to separate the judiciary from the political system, and high levels of illiteracy are the main stumbling blocks. Additionally, state employees are poorly paid, which makes them susceptible to bribery and corruption. There are unresolved issues with many pre-constitution laws which contradict the constitution. Many of the older laws derive from French legal norms as France was the former colonial power. Critics have also complained that the constitution makes no mention of the right to an adequate standard of living.

Since being written, the constitution has been translated into eight of the national languages of Benin. Broadcasts on local radio stations, in both urban and rural areas, have publicised the constitution across the country.

== Executive branch ==
Main office-holders
Office	Name	Party	Since
President	Patrice Talon	Independent	6 April 2016

The President of Benin is elected for a five-year term. An individual can serve only two terms, whether successive or separated. Election is by absolute majority, after a second round if necessary.

Candidates must be:

- Beninese by birth, or have had Beninese nationality for 10 years
- Between the ages of 40 and 70 on the date of his or her candidacy
- Resident in Benin during elections
- Declared mentally and physically fit by three doctors

In 2006, Mathieu Kérékou was not constitutionally permitted to run for re-election since he had already served two terms and was over 70 years old. Despite speculation, this was not changed and he stood down after the election of his successor, Yayi Boni.

The Cabinet of Benin is under the authority of the President, and serves to advise and help formulate strategies. It also liaises with ministries and other government institutions. The Beninese government's website has a full list and a selection of photos of senior ministers.

== Legislative branch ==
The National Assembly is the Parliament of Benin - the primary legislative body. Deputies are elected every four years, in contrast to the five-year term of the president. There are 109 available seats. It exercises the legislative power and oversight authority over Government action. Members of the army are not allowed to stand unless they resign from their military position.

== Elections and political parties ==
During the 2001 presidential elections, alleged irregularities led to a boycott of the run-off poll by the main opposition candidates. The four top-ranking contenders following the first round of presidential elections were Mathieu Kérékou (incumbent) 45.4%, Nicephore Soglo (former president) 27.1%, Adrien Houngbédji (National Assembly Speaker) 12.6%, and Bruno Amoussou (Minister of State) 8.6%. The second round balloting, originally scheduled for March 18, 2001, was postponed for days because both Soglo and Houngbédji withdrew, alleging electoral fraud. This left Kérékou to run against his own Minister of State, Amoussou, in what was termed a "friendly match". The next presidential elections were held in March 2006; with both Kérékou and Soglo constitutionally unable to stand, political newcomer Yayi Boni was elected, defeating Houngbédji in a second round of voting. Yayi Boni and his parliamentary allies also won the elections of 2011.

Talon ran as an independent candidate in the March 2016 presidential election. Although he finished second to Prime Minister Lionel Zinsou of the Cowry Forces for an Emerging Benin in the first round of voting, he won the second round with 65% of the vote. Talon said that he would "first and foremost tackle constitutional reform", discussing his plan to limit presidents to a single term of five years in order to combat "complacency". He also said that he planned to slash the size of the government from 28 to 16 members. He was sworn in on 6 April 2016. The composition of his government was announced later in the day.

On September 1, 2025, Talon and the Ruling Coalition in the National Assembly, made up of the Progressive Union for Renewal & Republican Bloc, nominated Finance Minister Romuald Wadagni as a Candidate for the 2026 Elections, with Talon confirming he would not seek a third term.

== Judicial branch ==
The Constitutional Court allows private citizens to challenge the government. This has been used particularly in cases of workplace discrimination. The Supreme Court has the highest level of jurisdiction in legal matters. It is designed as a check on the executive, and also acts in a consultative role. The High Court of Justice, which cannot include the President, is made up of members of the Constitutional Court, Parliament and the president of the Supreme Court. It alone can judge the President.

=== Audiovisual and Communication Authority ===
This institution guarantees the freedom of the press and access to the media. It is also charged with ensuring all citizens have access to official information.

== International organizations ==
ACP, AfDB, ECA, ECOWAS, Entente, FAO, FZ, G-77, IAEA, IBRD, ICAO, ICCt, ICFTU, ICRM, IDA, IDB, IFAD, IFC, IFRCS, ILO, IMF, IMO, Interpol, IOC, IOM, ITU, MIPONUH, MONUC, NAM, OAU, OIC, OPCW, UN, UNCTAD, UNESCO, UNIDO, UNMEE, UPU, WADB (regional), WAEMU, WCL, WCO, WFTU, WHO, WIPO, WMO, WToO, WTrO

== See also ==
- Vice President of Benin
- Ministry of Foreign Affairs and African Integration (Benin)
