= Benin–Niger crisis =

Economic-military crisis following 2023 Nigerien coup

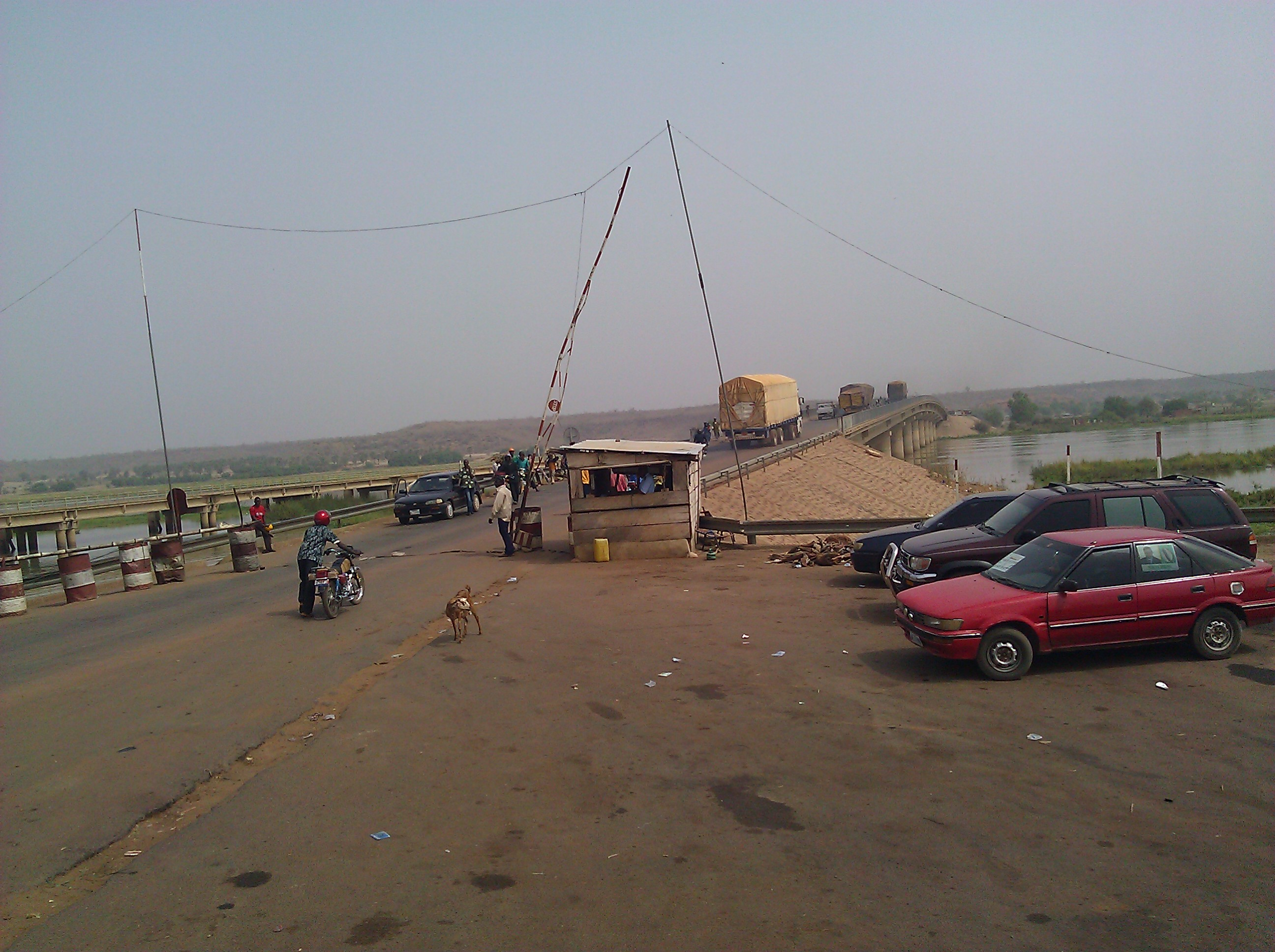
Border crossing at the Benin–Niger border

The Benin–Niger crisis is an ongoing diplomatic crisis that was triggered by the coup d'état in Niger in July 2023, which overthrew elected Nigerien President Mohamed Bazoum and installed a military junta in its place. In response, the Economic Community of West African States (ECOWAS) imposed diplomatic and economic sanctions against the new Nigerien authorities, which including border closures. Although most of these sanctions were lifted by February 2024, the ruling military maintained border closures and economic sanctions with Benin in addition to conflicts arising from illegal crossings into Benin from Niger. These in turn led to deteriorating relations and security between the two countries in addition to mutual economic downturn.

== Background ==
On July 26, 2023, a coup d'état overthrew President Mohamed Bazoum in Niger, which resulted in ECOWAS implementing diplomatic and economic sanctions against Niger. These sanctions included the closure of borders, the suspension of financial transactions, and the freezing of Niger's assets in foreign banks. All fifteen ECOWAS member states were affected, with the exception of the four members that were already suspended due to their implemented military regimes: Burkina Faso, Guinea, Mali and Niger. In addition, the eight members of the West African Economic and Monetary Union were also involved in the sanctions.

On December 10, 2023, ECOWAS maintained sanctions against Niger and demanded a return to constitutional order by reinstating President Bazoum to power. The Beninese authorities, most notably Beninese President Patrice Talon, aligned themselves with the official position of ECOWAS in support of regional military intervention in order to return Niger to its constitutional order.

== Conflict ==
=== Economic ===
Niger, a landlocked country, heavily relies on the autonomous port of Cotonou in Benin for importing goods due to it being the shortest route from Niger to a maritime port. The border closure has forced transporters to reroute through Lomé in Togo and Burkina Faso, increasing travel distances and costs, and subjecting them to the risks of insecurity in regions of Burkina Faso. This in turn led to significant delays and shortages of goods, exacerbating economic hardships in Niger. Several commercial and transit hubs in Niger, including Gaya, experienced drastic declines in business activity and significant inflation of everyday goods and widely consumed food commodities, with a lack of trucks coming in from Benin forcing traders to use insufficient river transport methods.

At the end of December 2023, Beninese President Patrice Talon announced the lifting of the suspension of imports of goods transiting to Niger through the autonomous port of Cotonou after the ECOWAS summit held on December 10 in Abuja. However, on 1 January 2024, the Nigerien Chamber of Commerce and Industry recommended that economic traders refrain from using the port of Cotonou in Benin, and instead continue use of the ports and corridors serving the nation, in particular the port of Lomé in Togo. The chamber stated that traders should not use the port for as long as the "unjust, illegal and iniquitous sanctions" of ECOWAS remained in place. In response to Nigerien authorities' refusal to reopen their borders, Benin briefly blocked the export of Nigerien oil from the port of Sémè before abruptly reversing the decision.

=== Military and security ===
Niger also kept its borders to Benin closed, which according to Nigerien Prime Minister Ali Lamine Zeine was done for "security reasons" related to the presence of French military bases in northern Benin. Zeine claimed that French military troops and terrorists were being trained for missions to destabilize the country, stating that they would reopen the border once they were certain their territory was safe. Beninese government spokesperson Wilfried Léandre Hougbédji replied that "The Prime Minister can deploy whatever satellite means he wants with his current military allies to check whether we have a military base", promoting the delivery of a Nigerien delegation, independent media, and drones to Benin to determine that no military bases or operations were present there. He further made a distinction between “Advanced Fortified Points” and military bases, stating that Benin has several proactively constructed military camps intended to ensure national security and fight against terrorism, and that their presence and future construction were public knowledge.

In June 2024, five Nigeriens were arrested on the site of a pipeline terminal station operated by the company WAPCO Benin after accessing the site without registering at the official entrance and while pretending that they were employees and carrying fake badges. Beninese investigators reported that at least two of the trespassers were Nigerien National Council for the Safeguarding of the Fatherland agents, with plans to "undermine the security of the State of Benin". Three of the trespassers were sentenced to 18 month suspended prison sentences for using false badges to garner fraudulent access to the site, according to Court for the Repression of Economic Offenses and Terrorism prosecutor Mario Metonou, before being released. Niger reacted immediately and accused Benin of having kidnapped and holding its nationals hostage in a deliberate mission to control the loading of oil between Benin and Niger, and vowed to "take all necessary steps" to take them back.

== Impact ==
Economist Soly Abdoulaye noted the severe economic impact of the crisis by stating that "80% of Niger's imports transit through Benin", with the border closure causing shortages of pharmaceutical products and basic necessities, significantly impacting Niger's economy. The International Monetary Fund (IMF) revised Benin's projected growth rate from 6% to 5.4% for 2023, citing the border closure as a key factor.

In response to economic downturn, Nigerien authorities implemented reforms to reduce taxes and duties on imported products, aiming to lower market prices. However, these measures have had limited success in alleviating the broader economic strain.

== Mediation ==
To resolve the crisis, former Beninese presidents Nicéphore Soglo and Thomas Boni Yayi began mediation efforts with the transitional Nigerien president General Tiani in Niamey on 24 June 2024.
