= 2011 Gabonese protests =

Inspired by Arab Spring, demanding reforms

The 2011 Gabonese protests is mass protests and violent protests against the government of Ali Bongo and his cabinet in Gabon, inspired by the Tunisian Revolution and 2011 Egyptian Revolution, mainly the Arab Spring, will calls for pan-Sub-Saharan reforms and calling for the government to step down.

== Background ==
The wave and period of massive anti-government protests and street demonstrations started as an opposition rally and unprecedented announcement of the instatement of opposition activist Andre Mba Obame as president; supporters came onto the streets in support of the plan. The protests was also dispersed and met with extreme force, like Tear gas and Rubber bullets.

== Protests ==
The protesters was marching first in Libreville, demonstrating against the federal government of Ali Bongo and calling on him to resign. The protest movement gained momentum, gaining attention on international outlets. The protests erupted in support of the opposition and solidarity marches was scheduled nationwide, despite a crackdown on sustained nationwide anti-government rallies. As soon as the protests began, the security forces responded to the anti-government street protests by Tear gas. After a tide of protests, the demonstrations was quelled by the police and opposition was banned. No concessions was made and the demands with protesters was suppressed.

== See also ==
- 2016 Gabonese protests
