= Shegun Adjadi Bakari =

Beninese politician

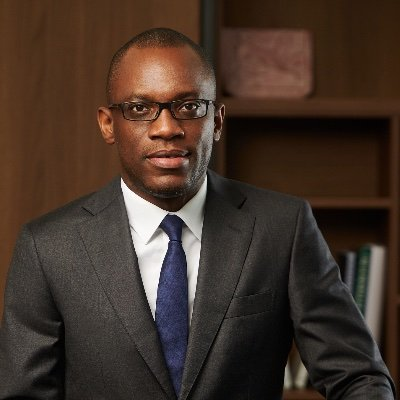

Minister of Foreign Affairs of Benin
- In office 6 June 2023 – 24 May 2026
- President: Patrice Talon
- Preceded by: Paulette Marcelline Adjovi
- Succeeded by: Corinne Amori Brunet

Personal details
- Born: Olushegun Adjadi Bakari; 20th century Pointe-Noire
- Education: University of Lille

Olushegun (Shegun) Adjadi Bakari is a Beninese banker, entrepreneur and politician. He began his career in the banking sector in France, where he gradually moved from supporting major automotive groups to financing projects in Africa. This latter period, during which he was involved in financing several projects in Africa, reinforced his desire to return to the continent he had left for his studies.

He first returned to Togo, where he was appointed presidential advisor from 2016 to 2021. He left this position to return to Benin, where he was appointed Minister of Foreign Affairs on June 6, 2023, by the President of the Republic. Since then, the former banker has been in charge of the strategic orientation of Benin's diplomacy and is at the forefront of the current tensions between Benin and Niger.

== Early life and education ==
Olushegun Adjadi Bakari was born in Pointe-Noire, Congo, in 1979, to Beninese parents. His father taught accounting in this Central African country. He returned to Benin with his parents in 1980, where he spent his entire childhood, immersing himself in the culture of his homeland, Benin, where he studied.

After passing his high school diploma with honors in 1997, he took the entrance exam for the National Economy Institute, now the National School of Applied Economic Science and Management (ENEAM). He was awarded a scholarship to study statistics at the school. An active student, he was elected President of the Students' Bureau and became one of the main leaders of the National Federation of Benin Students.

After graduating from the INE in 2000, he worked for 18 months in a family business, Tourist Center Bimyns, which also houses a Radio called Radio Weke. This first professional experience, focused on trade, allowed Olushegun Adjadi Bakari to discover Nigeria, where he traveled to prospect. After this experience, he spent several months in a kibbutz in Israel as part of an exchange program with young Africans to discover Israeli culture and economy. The experience enabled the Beninese to cultivate a capacity for adaptability that enabled him to integrate into different environments.

Arrived in France in 2002, he obtained a Master's degree in Mathematics Applied to Social Sciences at the University of Lille, followed by a Master's degree in Finance at the Superior Business School of Lille (now SKEMA).

== Banker in France ==
In the last year of his studies, he did a work-study placement with the Vauban provident group, which merged with Humanis in 2006. He was then spotted and recruited by ALD Automotive, a subsidiary of the Societe Generale group, where he became an employee. He stayed there for two years before moving to BMW France as Finance Manager. After this experience, he returned to Société Générale in 2008. His efficiency convinced his superiors, who brought him into the Finance and Strategy Department, where he worked as Group Results Supervisor. He then became Strategic Head of Banking and Financing.

In 2011, he was appointed Senior Manager in charge of major French automotive groups, managing customers such as Peugeot, Renault, Valeo, and Michelin. Olushegun Adjadi Bakari was then appointed Director in charge of Société Générale's structural financing activities for African countries. In this position, he assists major French and European companies with energy infrastructure projects on the African continent. For example, Olushegun Adjadi Bakari was in charge of the Azura Edo power plant in Nigeria and the Nacala Corridor project in Mozambique. He then decided to return to Africa.

== Back to Africa ==
Olushegun Adjadi Bakari left Société Générale and joined Togo in July 2016 to develop and implement the electrification and energy transition strategy, which will be recognized as one of the most ambitious on the continent. After five years in Togo, he left his position in 2021 to return to the private sector. He helped establish the Abu Dhabi-based investment fund Atif (Africa Transformation and Industrialization Fund). The Fund invests in M Auto, rebranded Spiro, a company specializing in electric vehicles. To implement the Atif Group's strategy, Olushegun Bakari is appointed CEO of Spiro. He adjusted the company's strategy, developed it in 4 countries (Benin, Togo, Rwanda, Uganda), and, in the space of 15 months, increased the number of electric motorcycles from 0 to 15,000 in 3 countries, including Benin. He held This position when Beninese President Patrice Talon appointed him Minister Counsellor for Investments.

== Political career ==
Olushegun Adjadi Bakari began his political career in the student world. As president of his university's student office, he took part in discussions within the National Federation of Beninese University Students, which often served as a gateway into the political arena. He finally got involved in the 2016 presidential elections in Benin, lending his support to candidate Abdoulaye Bio Tchané, who finished 4th in the first round with 8.79% of the vote. In the 2nd round of voting, the candidate lent his support to Patrice Talon, who became president in the second round.

== Foreign ministers and a vision of diplomacy ==
On June 6, 2023, Olushegun Adjadi Bakari was appointed Minister of Foreign Affairs. He spent several weeks understanding Benin's diplomacy and the changes it needed to make. The adaptability he had acquired during his various professional experiences enabled him to quickly conclude. He implements President Talon's vision of diplomacy at the service of development. To this end, he has announced what he likes to call 4D Diplomacy (Availability, Diaspora, Digital and Development). He makes economic diplomacy an essential pillar of his action and puts the diplomatic network at the service of identifying and attracting investors. He is a fervent supporter of regional integration.
