= Romuald Wadagni =

President of Benin since 2026

His Excellency Romuald Wadagni
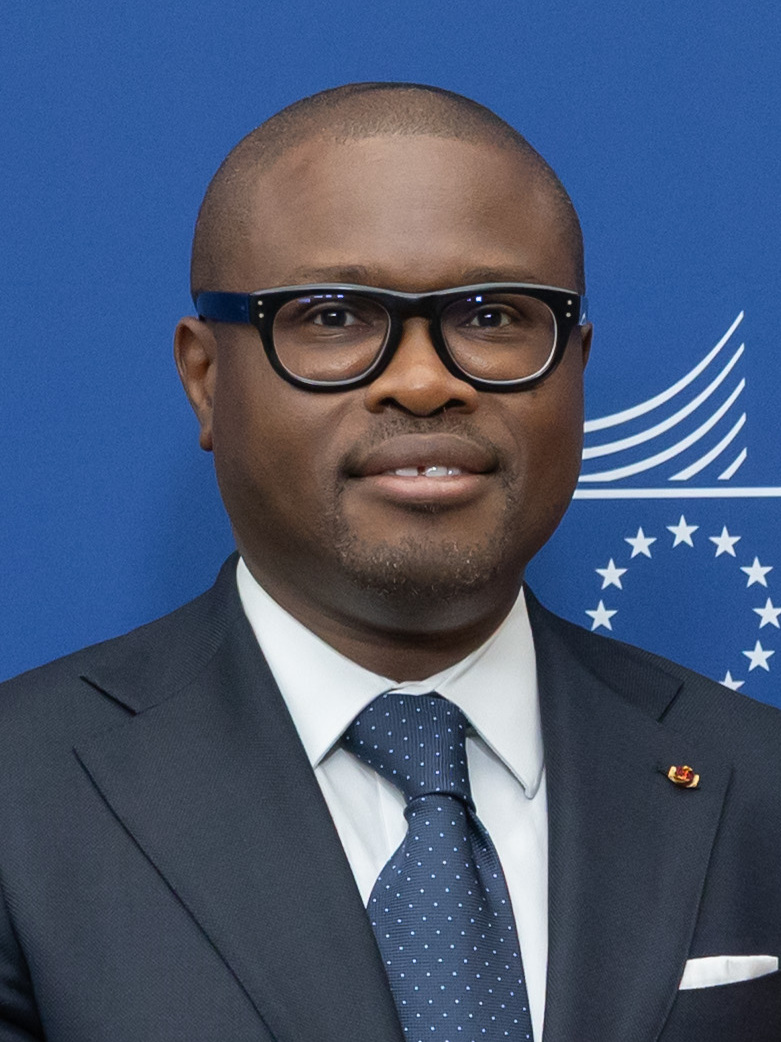
- Wadagni in 2026

9th President of Benin
- Incumbent
- Assumed office 24 May 2026
- Vice President: Mariam Chabi Talata
- Preceded by: Patrice Talon

Minister of Economy and Finance
- In office 7 April 2016 – 24 May 2026
- President: Patrice Talon
- Preceded by: Komi Koutché
- Succeeded by: Aristide Médenou

Personal details
- Born: Kossi Mbueke Romuald Wadagni; 20 June 1976 (age 50) Lokossa, Benin
- Party: Independent
- Spouse: Nathalie Villette
- Children: 2
- Relatives: Nestor Wadagni
- Education: Grenoble École de Management; Harvard Business School
- Profession: Politician; businessman

Kossi Mbueke Romuald Wadagni (born 20 June 1976) is a Beninese politician and businessman who has served as the ninth president of Benin since 2026. Prior to that, he served as Minister of Economy and Finance under President Patrice Talon from 2016 to 2026, and worked for the consulting firm Deloitte prior to entering politics.

== Early life and education ==
Kossi Mbueke Romuald Wadagni was born in Lokossa on 20 June 1976, the eldest of five children. His father, Nestor Wadagni, a statistician and economist with a degree from ENSAE, had a career in the Beninese civil service before writing a thesis in fundamental mathematics after his retirement. From an early age, he took an interest in manual work and trained himself in bricklaying and mechanics.

After obtaining a scientific baccalauréat in Benin, Wadagni continued his studies in France. From 1995 to 1999, he studied at the École supérieure des affaires de Grenoble (ESA) (now Institut d'administration des entreprises de Grenoble) where he obtained a master's degree in finance, graduating top of his class. During his studies in Grenoble, he met a partner from Deloitte who identified his potential and recruited him into the consulting firm in 1998.

== Business career ==
At the end of his studies, Wadagni joined the Deloitte office in Lyon, where he stayed for four years and became a supervisor. In 2003, he passed the US Uniform Certified Public Accountant Examination and left France for the United States. In Boston, he joined the Deloitte office as an audit manager. He stayed there for 3 years, until 2006. He worked with companies including Orange, and was involved in mergers and acquisitions. In 2007, he attended the Harvard Business School and completed a training in private equity and venture capital.

Wadagni was promoted in 2012, becoming a partner at Deloitte at the age of 36. He participated in the structuring of Deloitte's activities in the zone, which in 2012 included Ivory Coast, Senegal, Benin, Gabon, Congo, Equatorial Guinea, the Democratic Republic of Congo, Morocco, Algeria and Tunisia. In the DRC, Wadagni opened the Deloitte offices in Kinshasa and Lubumbashi in 2012. As Professional Practice Director for the African continent, Romuald Wadagni ensured that international standards were applied by the entire Deloitte network in Francophone Africa. In November 2015, he became the head of auditing for Francophone Africa.

In 2015, Wadagni re-enrolled at Harvard as part of the (non-degree) General Management Program of Harvard Business School. By 2016, he had accrued 17 years of expertise in French (Paris and Lyon), American (Boston and New York), and African (Lubumbashi) firms of Deloitte. He is recognized for his expertise in IFRS, US GAAP conversion assignment missions, offering-type transactions (IPO, fund-raising, etc.), as well as in the restructuring of public and private companies.

== Political career ==
=== Minister in Talon governments (2016–2026) ===
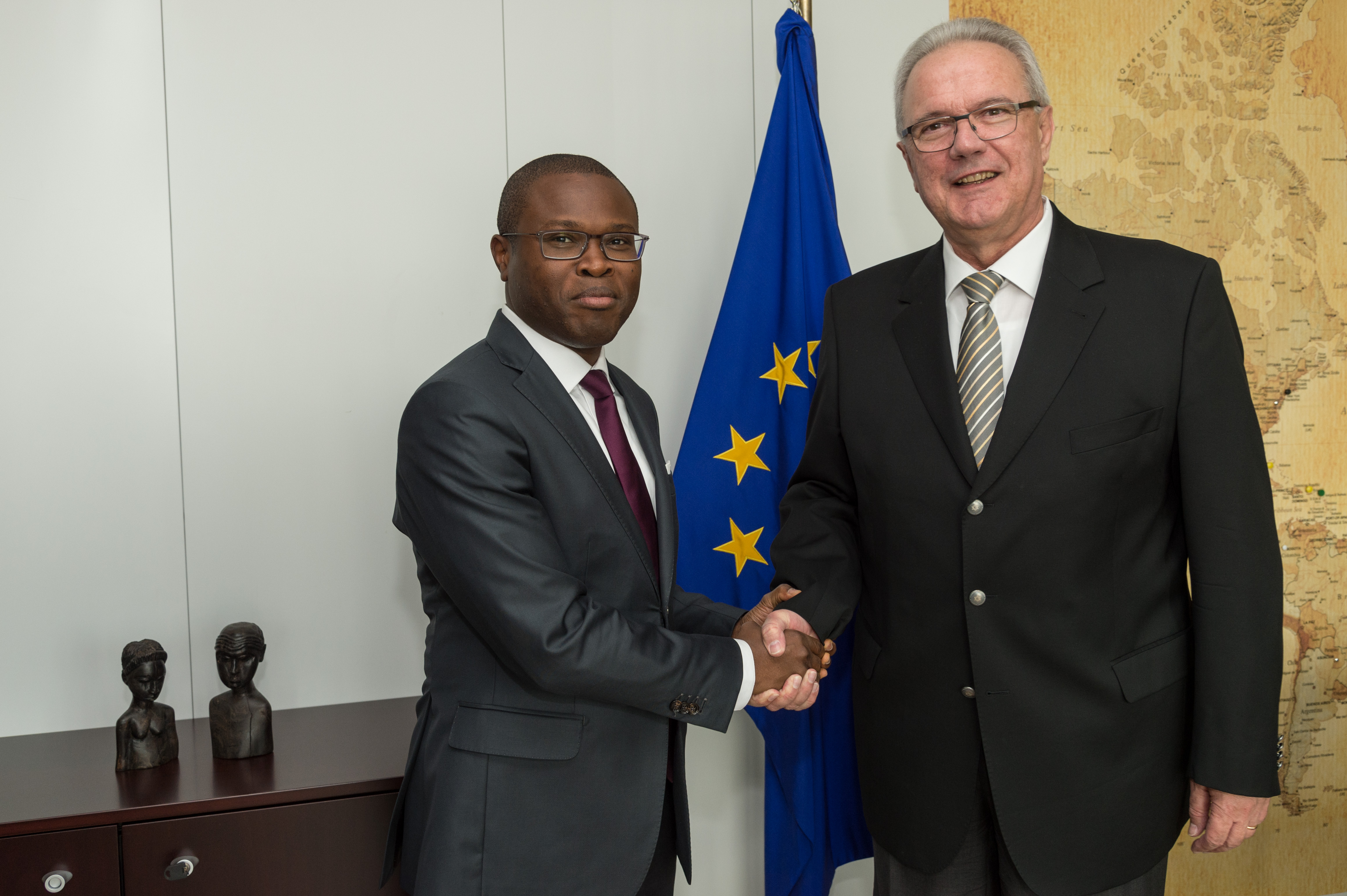
Wadagani with European Commissioner for International Cooperation and Development Neven Mimica, June 2016

On 7 April 2016, Wadagni was appointed Minister of Economy and Finance in the first Talon government. Faced with a country weakened by debt, Wadagni made the consolidation of public finances his priority, in order to make Benin credible to international public and private donors. He promoted a proactive debt management policy and made successful exits on the international financial market. The credibility gained by honoring its commitments allowed the country to borrow on a very long-term basis and at rates lower than other countries in the region, such as Ivory Coast and Senegal. In October 2018, Wadagni completed a €260 million loan for Benin on the international markets. This was a first for the country.

During the COVID-19 pandemic, Benin's economy showed resilience. Benin was among the three countries with the highest growth rate in sub-Saharan Africa in 2020 (about 3.8%), with a rebound to 7.2% in 2021 and an estimated average of 6.4% over the 2022-2026 period. After Benin's good performance during this period, the rating agency Moody's upgraded the country's rating in March 2021 from B2 with a positive outlook to B1 with a stable outlook. In April 2022, Fitch Ratings maintained the B+ rating, with a stable outlook. Wadagni also worked to promote the private sector and entrepreneurship. In 2020, Benin became the foremost country for ease and speed of creating a new business according to the United Nations Conference on Trade and Development (UNCTAD).

On 12 January 2021, Benin issued two Eurobonds. The first, for 11 years, was at a rate of 4.9%, for an amount of €700 million. A second, over 31 years, was with a rate of 6.9%, for an amount of €300 million. With this operation, Benin joined the limited number of emerging issuers to have a euro-denominated Eurobond with a maturity of more than 30 years. In July 2021, Benin carried out a major operation by becoming the first African country to issue a Eurobond dedicated to the financing of projects with a high impact on the achievement of the United Nations Sustainable Development Goals, for an amount of 328 billion CFA francs (€500 million) and an interest rate of 4.9%. This operation followed several months of work by Romuald Wadagni and his team, and trips to meet investors in Asia, Europe and America. On 29 November 2021, the country repaid part of its debt early, finalizing the early redemption of a CFA 218 billion (€332 million) bond tranche on BRVM, including more than CFA 150 billion in bonds issued through public offerings. With this operation, Benin saved more than 36 billion CFA francs (about €55 million) in non-accrued interest, which were directly injected into various social impact projects. Following this operation, the magazine Jeune Afrique published an article entitled "How Romuald Wadagni made Cotonou save 55 million euros".

In May 2021, Patrice Talon reappointed him as Minister of Economy and Finance. From 2018 to 2020, he chaired the UEMOA Council of Ministers, where he led several reforms, including that of the CFA franc, which the African Development Bank described as "historic". In 2022, in the context of the economic crisis following the COVID-19 pandemic and the Russian-Ukrainian war, Wadagni took measures to preserve the purchasing power of the Beninese. The authorities announced that they would invest more than 41 billion CFA francs ($66 million) in reducing the prices of consumer goods. In April 2022, he led the Beninese delegation to Washington for the completion of an unprecedented $700 million agreement between Benin and the International Monetary Fund (IMF), involving both the Extended Credit Facility and the Extended Fund Facility. When the agreement was concluded, the IMF emphasized that Benin had made significant progress in terms of macroeconomic management.

In early 2023, Patrice Talon widened Wadagni's scope to include international cooperation and defense issues, with a focus on securing the north of the country and acquiring military equipment. In October 2023, as a result of the various reforms, Benin was ranked eighth in the world, and first in Africa, in the global tax expenditure transparency index published by the Economic Policy Council and the German Institute of Development and Sustainability (IDOS). In December 2023, the IMF validated a two-year agreement for the country under the Resilience and Sustainability Facility (FRD) for an amount equivalent to $200 million. At the time, the IMF stated: "Program performance remains strong, with all quantitative targets to end-June 2023 achieved and structural benchmarks implemented".

In February 2024, against a backdrop of high interest rates, a Beninese delegation led by Wadagni met with investors in London and New York City to discuss Benin's first bond issue in US dollars. In mid-February 2024, Benin became the second African country to return to the international debt market after Ivory Coast. The country attracted international investors and raised $750 million by issuing its first US dollar bond. The bond has a term of 14 years and a coupon of 7.96%. With an interest-rate swap, the euro coupon is 6.5%. Le Figaro describes the country's first dollar issue as a success, "reflecting its financial credibility and growth momentum". The newspaper quotes Wadagni: "The IMF granted us financing equivalent to 400% of our quota, whereas the average is 125%, and we also had access to the resilience fund, which grants long-term loans ". In Bloomberg, Gemcorp Capital management's chief economist highlights the fact that Benin managed to issue its bond at a yield equal to, or even lower than, that of the Ivory Coast.

In April 2024, Standard & Poor's upgraded Benin's credit rating from "B+" to "BB−", maintaining a stable outlook. This upgrade is attributed to the country's robust economic and fiscal performance. This is one of the highest ratings awarded to a sub-Saharan African country, after Botswana, Mauritius and the Ivory Coast. For its part, Fitch Ratings confirmed Benin's credit rating at "B+", with a stable outlook. The agency recognizes Benin's robust economic reforms and proactive debt management. Moody's forecasts sustained economic growth, anticipating favorable fiscal consolidation and a reduction in the budget deficit to 2.9% of GDP by 2025.

In May 2024, the 2023 Open Budget Survey (EBO) ranked Benin first among French-speaking countries for budget transparency, with a score of 79 out of 100, a score that doubled between 2017 and 2023 under Wadagni's ministry. This puts Benin in second place in the continental ranking, surpassed only by South Africa. In November 2024, at COP 29 in Baku, Wadagni presented an "innovative" financing plan to combat global warming, with the support of international financial institutions. The plan includes the creation of a climate finance unit and the use of mechanisms such as carbon credits and green bonds.

In January 2025, Benin issued $500 million in international bonds. Thanks to strong demand ($3.5 billion), it raises at a rate of 8.625%, below the initial range of 9.25%~9.375%. At the same time, it obtained a 500 million loan from Deutsche Bank, enabling it to buy back Eurobond 2032 and thus improve the terms of its public debt. At the beginning of 2025, while many were hoping that he would apply for the presidency of the African Development Bank, he was not among the candidates registered at the time of the closing of registrations.

== Presidency (2026–present) ==
In September 2025, Wadagni was nominated by the ruling coalition as a candidate in the 2026 Beninese presidential election. Incumbent President Patrice Talon announced he would not run for a third term, paving the way for Wadagni's victory. On April 12, 2026, Wadagni, alongside running mate Mariam Chabi Talata, won the election with four million votes, approximately 94% of those cast.

Wadagni is sworn in as President of Benin for a seven-year term on 24 May 2026. He visited Nigeria as part of his first overseas visit as president on 1 June 2026.

== Honours and awards ==
In 2021, the financial newspaper Financial Afrik named Wadagni "Best African Minister of Economy and Finance". In 2024, Financial Afrik named him "Finance Minister of the Year" for the 4th time in its ranking of "The 100 who are transforming Africa".

== Other activities ==
Since 2016, Wadagni is Ex-Officio Member of the Board of Governors of the ECOWAS Bank for Investment and Development (EBID), the European Bank for Reconstruction and Development (EBRD), and the Islamic Development Bank.

Political offices
Preceded by Komi Koutché	Minister of Economy and Finance; 2016–2026	Succeeded by Aristide Médenou
Preceded by Patrice Talon	President of Benin; 2026–present	Incumbent
