= COVID-19 pandemic in Benin =

Ongoing COVID-19 viral pandemic in Benin

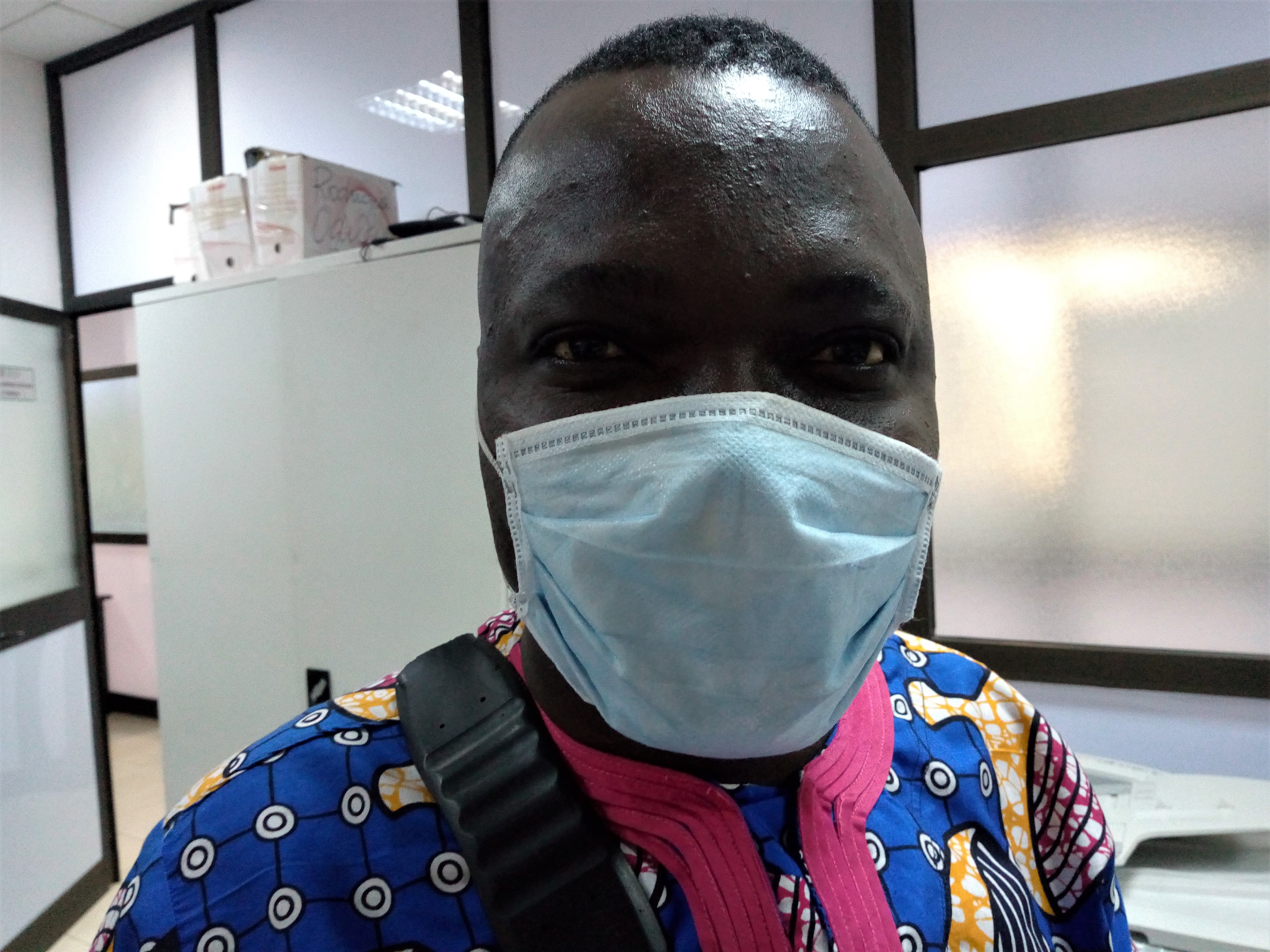
- A Beninese wearing a face mask.
- Disease: COVID-19
- Pathogen: SARS-CoV-2
- Location: Benin
- First outbreak: Wuhan, China
- Index case: Porto-Novo
- Arrival date: 16 March 2020 (6 years, 4 months, 3 weeks and 5 days)
- Confirmed cases: 28,036 (updated 5 August 2026)
- Deaths: 163 (updated 5 August 2026)
- Vaccinations: 3,697,190 (total vaccinated); 2,742,837 (fully vaccinated); 4,232,541 (doses administered)

Government website
- https://sante.gouv.bj/COVID19-TOUT-SAVOIR-SUR-LA-GESTION-DE-LA-PANDEMIE-AU-BENIN

The COVID-19 pandemic in Benin was a part of the worldwide pandemic of coronavirus disease 2019 (COVID-19) caused by severe acute respiratory syndrome coronavirus 2 (SARS-CoV-2). The virus was confirmed to have reached Benin in March 2020.

== Background ==
On 12 January 2020, the World Health Organization (WHO) confirmed that a novel coronavirus was the cause of a respiratory illness in a cluster of people in Wuhan City, Hubei Province, China, which was reported to the WHO on 31 December 2019.

The case fatality ratio for COVID-19 has been much lower than SARS of 2003, but the transmission has been significantly greater, with a significant total death toll. Model-based simulations for Benin suggest that the 95% confidence interval for the time-varying reproduction number R_{t} diminished to around 0.6 during the second half of 2021.

== Timeline ==
=== March to June 2020 ===
- On 16 March, the first COVID-19 case in the country was confirmed in Porto-Novo, the capital of Benin. Three days later, the second confirmed case was reported. The city has suspended various international flights and people coming into the country via air are being kept under 14 days' mandatory isolation. Moreover, people in Benin are advised to wear masks and go outside home only if required.
- There were 9 confirmed cases and one recovery in March, leaving 8 active cases at the end of the month.
- In April there were 55 new cases, bringing the total number of confirmed cases to 64. The first death from COVID-19 occurred on 5 April. The number of recovered patients increased to 33, leaving 30 active cases at the end of the month.
- There were 168 new cases in May, bringing the total number of confirmed cases to 232. The death toll grew to 3. There were 110 recoveries during the month, raising the number of recovered patients to 143, leaving 86 active cases at the end of the month.
- In June there were 967 new cases, bringing the total number of confirmed cases to 1199. The death toll rose to 21. There were 190 recoveries during the month, bringing the number of recovered patients to 333, leaving 845 active cases at the end of the month.

=== July to December 2020 ===
- There were 3,251 confirmed cases in 2020. 3,061 patients recovered in 2020 while 44 persons died. At the end of 2020 there were 146 active cases.

=== 2021 ===
- The national vaccination campaign began on 29 March, initially with 144,000 doses of the Covishield vaccine.
- There were 21,684 confirmed cases in 2021, bringing the total number of cases to 24,935. 21,675 patients recovered in 2021 while 117 persons died, raising the death toll to 161. At the end of 2021 there were 38 active cases.
- Modeling carried out by WHO's Regional Office for Africa suggests that due to under-reporting, the true cumulative number of infections by the end of 2021 was around 5.4 million while the true number of COVID-19 deaths was around 1470.

=== 2022 ===
- There were 3,047 confirmed cases in 2022, bringing the total number of cases to 27,982. 3,081 patients recovered in 2022 while 2 persons died, raising the death toll to 163. At the end of 2022 there were 2 active cases.

=== 2023 ===
- There were 54 confirmed cases in 2023, bringing the total number of cases to 28,036. 30 patients recovered in 2023. The death toll remained unchanged. At the end of 2023 there were 26 active cases.

== Vaccination ==
COVID-19 vaccination in Benin is an ongoing immunization campaign against severe acute respiratory syndrome coronavirus 2 (SARS-CoV-2), the virus that causes coronavirus disease 2019 (COVID-19), in response to the ongoing pandemic in the country. As of 18 December 2022, Benin has administered 4,232,541 doses, 3,697,190 people with one dose (27.7% of the population), and 2,742,837 people fully vaccinated (20.5% of the population).

=== Vaccines on order ===
Vaccine	Approval	Deployment
Covishield	11 March 2021	29 March 2021
Sinovac	22 March 2021	29 March 2021
Janssen	27 July 2021	Yes

=== Timeline ===
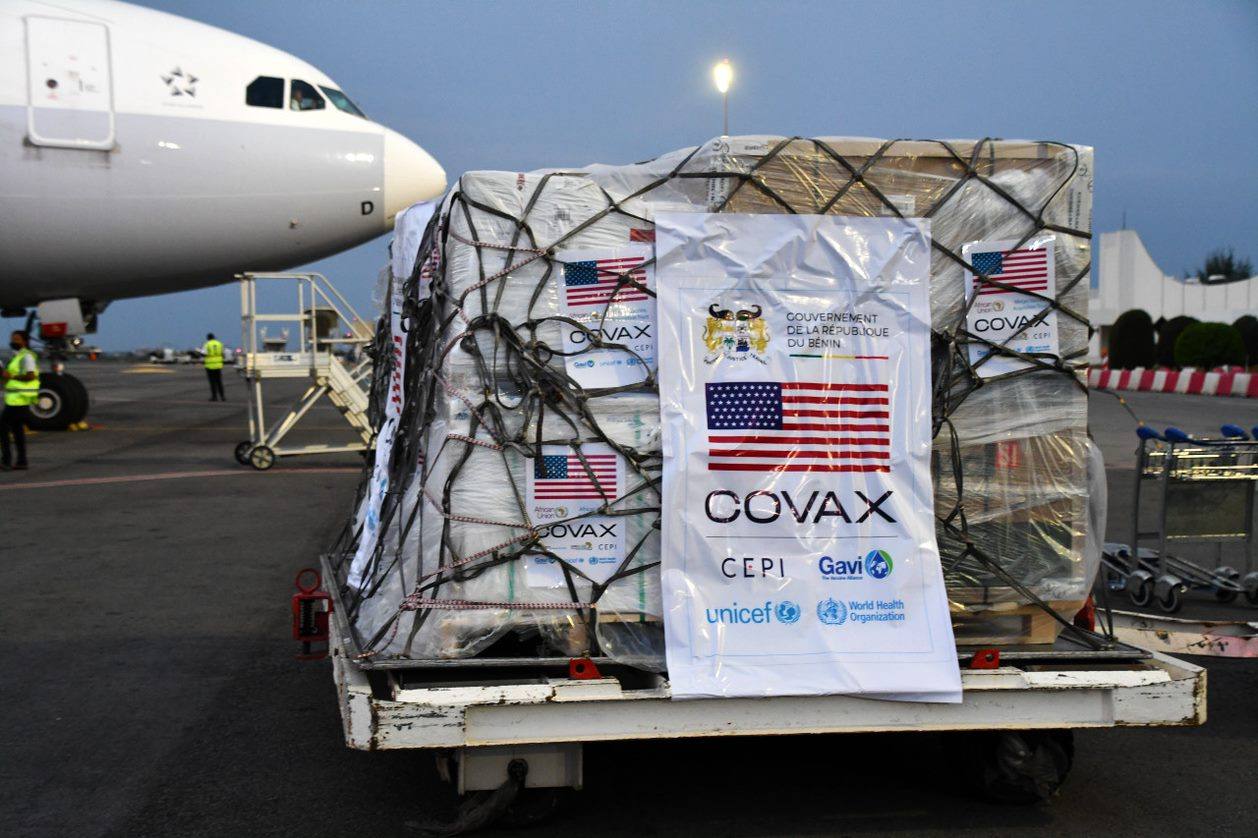
Doses of the Janssen COVID-19 vaccine arrive in 2021 from the US as part of the COVAX program

- On 11 March 2021, Benin received 144,000 doses of the AstraZeneca vaccine.
- On 22 March 2021, Benin received 203,000 doses of the Sinovac vaccine.
- On 29 March 2021, Benin launched its coronavirus vaccination campaign.
- Benin received 302,400 doses of the Janssen COVID-19 vaccine on 27 July.

== See also ==
- COVID-19 pandemic in Africa
- COVID-19 pandemic by country and territory
