= Ministry of Foreign Affairs and Cooperation (Benin) =

Beninese government ministry

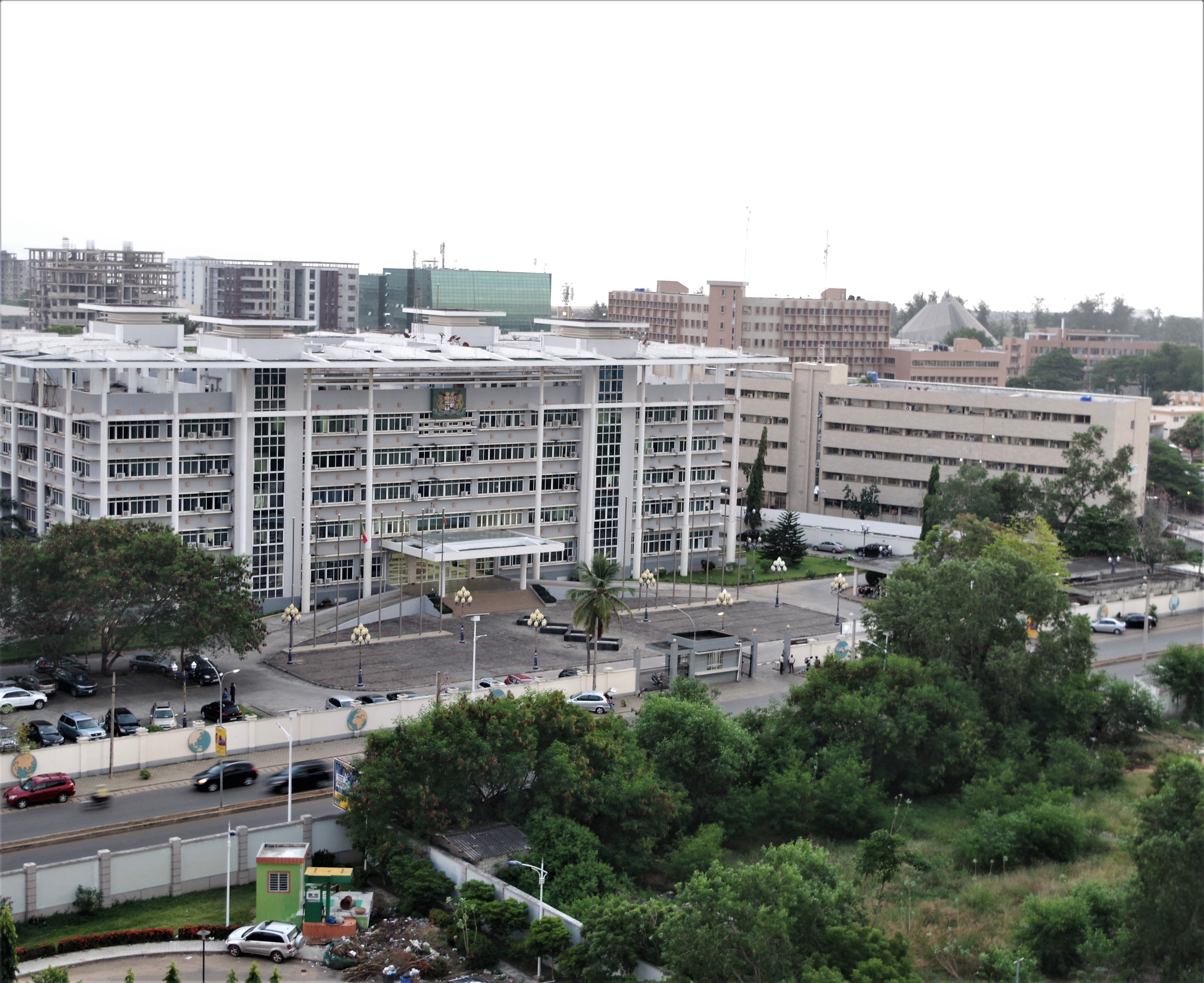
Ministry in Cotonou

The Ministry of Foreign Affairs and Cooperation (Ministère des Affaires étrangères) is the ministry of the Government of Benin (known as Dahomey in 1960–75 and as the People's Republic of Benin in 1975–90) which oversees the foreign relations of Benin. The head of the ministry, the Minister of Foreign Affairs, is Shegun Adjadi Bakari since 6 June 2023.

== See also ==
- Foreign relations of Benin
