= Louis Vlavonou =

Beninese politician (born 1953)

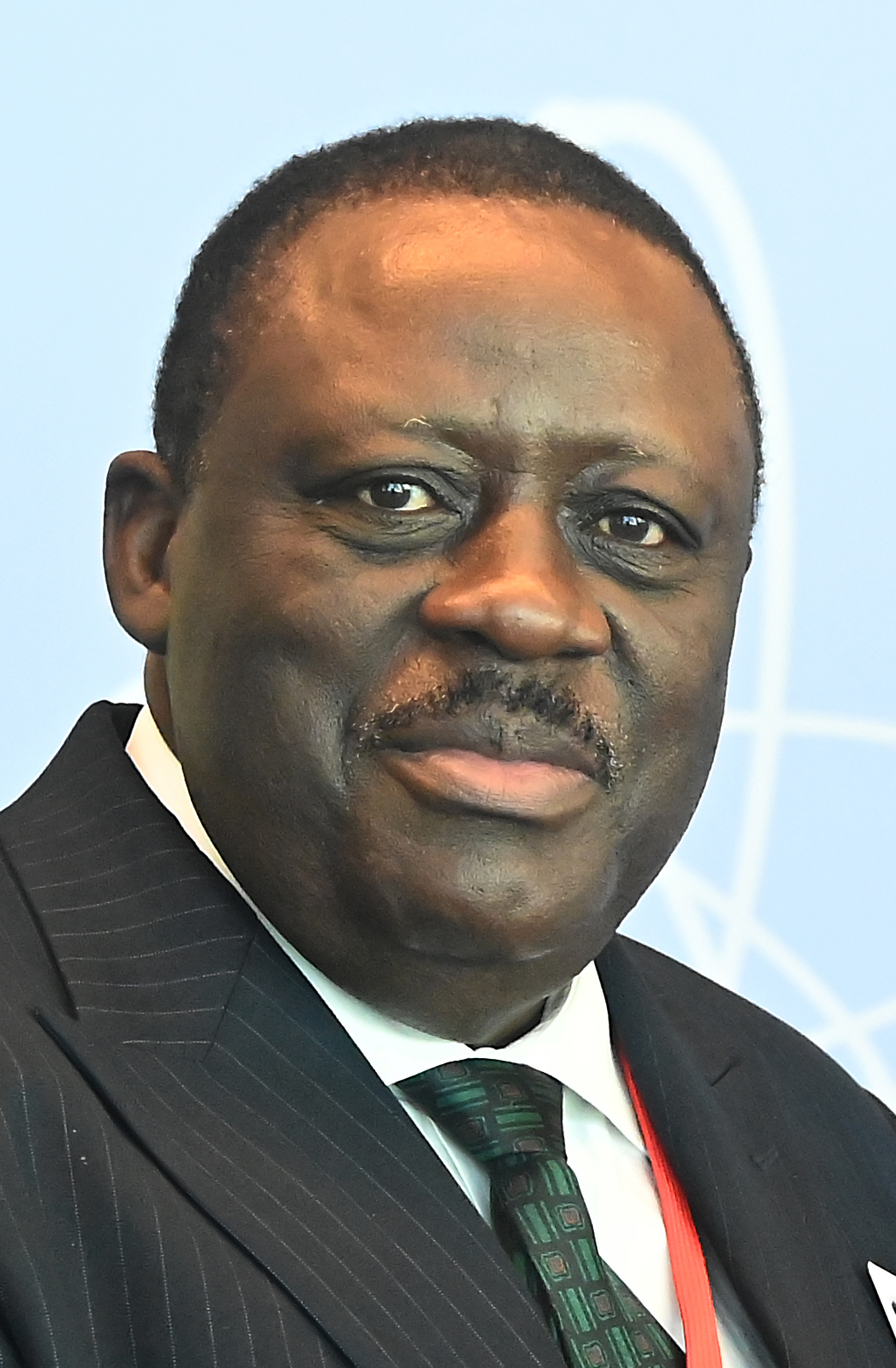
- Vlavonou in 2021

President of the National Assembly
- In office 18 May 2019 – 8 February 2026
- President: Patrice Talon
- Preceded by: Adrien Houngbédji
- Succeeded by: Joseph Djogbenou

Personal details
- Born: 1953 (age 72–73)
- Party: Progressive Union
- Profession: Customs officer
- Website: louisvlavonou.com

Gbèhounou Louis Vlavonou (born 1953) is a Beninese politician who was the President of the National Assembly in 2019–2026.

He is a member of the Progressive Union party. He has been a Member of Parliament since 2003 before being elected president of the National Assembly of Benin on 17 May 2019 with 78 votes, 1 against and 3 abstentions.
