= Vice President of Benin =

- Vice président du Bénin
- Flag of Benin

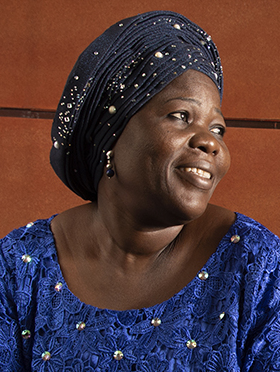
- Incumbent; Mariam Chabi Talata since 24 May 2021
- Appointer: Direct popular vote (two rounds if necessary)
- Term length: 5 years
- Constituting instrument: Constitution of Benin
- Formation: 1960 (as VP of Dahomey, abolished 1965); 2019 (as VP of Benin)
- First holder: Sourou-Migan Apithy

The vice president of Benin is the second highest political position in Benin. The vice presidency was created by the 2019 amendments made to the Constitution of Benin. The vice president is elected concurrently with the president in direct popular elections. The 2021 election was the first time that a vice president was elected in Benin.

The vice presidency is largely ceremonial. It was created to ensure succession in case of a vacancy in the presidency. The vice president can have other tasks entrusted to them by the president.

== History ==
When Benin first achieved independence in 1960, as Dahomey, Sourou-Migan Apithy was elected as the first vice president. Apithy would serve as vice president until the 1963 Dahomeyan coup d'état, in which the president resigned. Apithy took over the role of president in 1964, and Justin Ahomadégbé-Tomêtin was placed into the vice presidency after the coup. After a second coup in 1965, the position was abolished.

Dahomey, and later Benin, functioned without a vice president until 2019, when a series of constitutional reforms created the position. The first election with a vice presidential position took place in 2021, in which Mariam Chabi Talata was elected as vice president on a ticket with incumbent president Patrice Talon.

== List of vice presidents ==
=== Dahomey ===
Portrait	Name	Took office	Left office	Notes
	Sourou-Migan Apithy	1 August 1960	1963	
	Justin Ahomadégbé-Tomêtin	January 1964	November 1965	

=== Benin ===
Portrait	Name	Took office	Left office	President	Notes
	Mariam Chabi Talata	24 May 2021	Incumbent	Patrice Talon	
	Mariam Chabi Talata	24 May 2021	Incumbent	Romuald Wadagni	

== See also ==
- Benin
  - Politics of Benin
  - President of Benin
