= President of Benin =

Head of state

- Président du Bénin (French)
- Flag of Benin

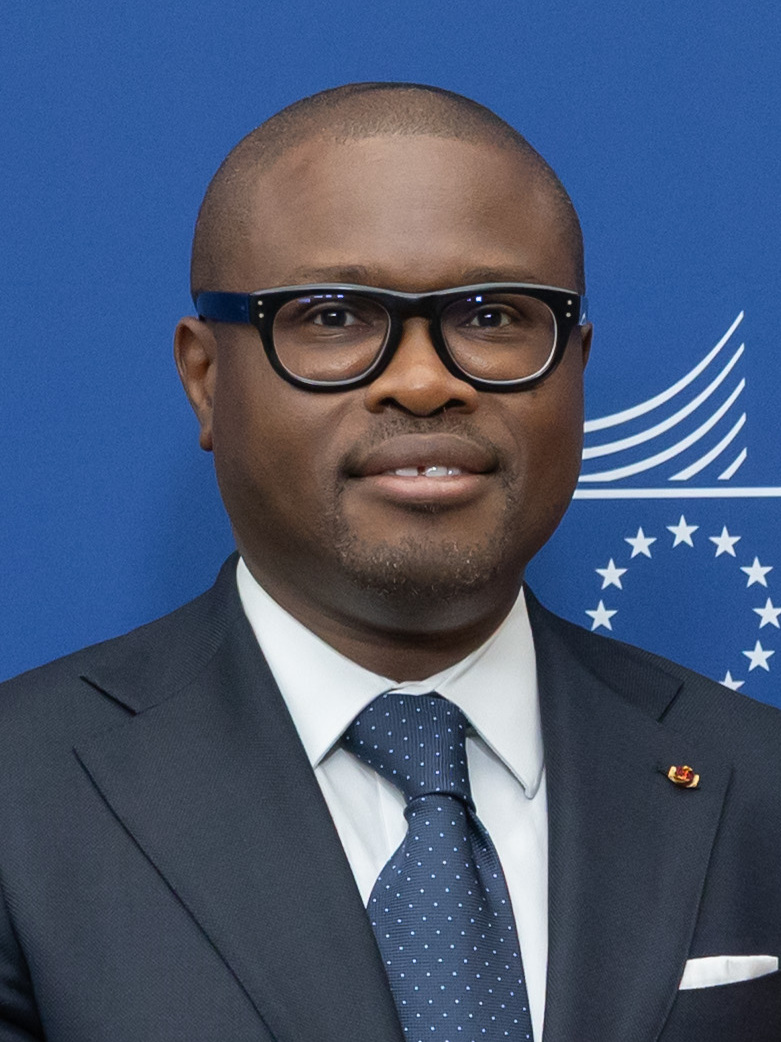
- Incumbent; Romuald Wadagni since 24 May 2026
- Type: Head of state Head of government Commander-in-Chief
- Residence: Presidential Palace, Porto-Novo; Presidential Palace, Cotonou
- Term length: Seven years, renewable once
- Constituting instrument: Constitution of Benin (1958)
- Inaugural holder: Hubert Maga
- Formation: 31 December 1960; 65 years ago
- Succession: Vice President of Benin
- Deputy: Vice President of Benin
- Salary: 18,184,994 West African CFA francs/29,810 USD annually
- Website: presidence.bj

The president of Benin (French: Président de la République du Bénin) is both head of state and head of government in Benin. The Cabinet of Benin is under the authority of the President, and serves to advise and help formulate strategies. It also liaises with ministries and other government institutions. The President is also the Commander-in-Chief of the Benin Armed Forces

A total of ten people have served as president (not counting acting presidents, interim military officeholders and collective presidencies). Additionally, two persons, Hubert Maga and Mathieu Kérékou, have served on two non-consecutive occasions. In 2025, a constitutional amendment lengthened the president's term from five years to seven years.

== Description of the office ==
=== Election ===
The president is elected by universal suffrage for seven years. They are limited to two terms, whether successive or separated.

Presidential candidates must be:

1. Beninese citizens by birth, or a naturalised citizen for at least 10 years.
2. Possess "good morality" and "great honesty."
3. Enjoy his civil and political rights.
4. Between 40 and 70 years old at the time of filing.
5. A resident of Benin at the time of the election.
6. Must have their physical and mental well-being duly verified by a collegiate board of three doctors sworn and designated by the Constitutional Court.

Presidents are elected via a two-round system. Elections must take place between 30 and 40 days before the expiration of the incumbent president's term. If no candidate receives an absolute majority in the first round, a runoff takes place between the top two finishers in the first round.

The runoff takes place 15 days after the second round. If one or both of the two top finishers withdraw before the runoff, the next finishers advance in order of filing. A plurality is required to win.

Elections are arranged by a decree of the council of ministers.

The first round of balloting for the election of the President of the Republic shall take place at least thirty days and at most forty days before the expiration date of the powers of the President in office.

The mandate of the new President of the Republic shall take effect by counting from the expiration date of the mandate of his predecessor.

=== Oath of office ===
Before taking his office, the President of the Republic shall take the following oath:

Before God, the Manes [spirits] of the ancestors, the Nation and before the Béninese People, the only holder of sovereignty;

I, President of the Republic, elected in accordance with the laws of the Republic do solemnly swear

— To respect and defend the Constitution which the Béninese People have freely given to themselves;

— To fulfill loyally the high office that the Nation has entrusted to me;

— To allow myself to be guided only by the general interest and the respect for human rights to consecrate all my strength to the research and the promotion of the common good, of peace and of national unity;

— To preserve the integrity of the national territory;

— To conduct myself everywhere as a faithful and loyal servant of the people.

In case of perjury, that I shall submit to the severity of the law.

This oath shall be received by the President of the Constitutional Court before the National Assembly and the Supreme Court.

=== Vacancy ===
In case of vacancy of the Presidency of the Republic by death, resignation or permanent impediment, the National Assembly shall reconvene in order to rule on the case with an absolute majority of its members. The President of the National Assembly shall refer the matter to the Constitutional Court which shall certify it and declare the vacancy of the Presidency of the Republic. The duties of President of the Republic, with the exception of those mentioned in Articles 54 paragraph 3, 50, 60, 101, and 154 shall be temporarily exercised by the President of the National Assembly.

The election of a new President of the Republic shall take place thirty days at the least and forty days at most after the declaration of the permanent nature of the vacancy.

In case of bringing an accusation of the President of the Republic before the High Court of Justice, his interim shall be assumed by the President of the Constitutional Court who shall exercise all the duties of President of the Republic with the exception of those mentioned in Articles 54 paragraph 3, 58, 60, 101 and 154.

In case of absence from the territory, of illness and of vacation of the President of the Republic, his interim shall be assumed by a member of the Government whom he shall have designated and within the limitation of powers that he shall have delegated to him.

== Latest election ==
Candidate	Running mate	Party	Votes	%
Romuald Wadagni	Mariam Chabi Talata	Independent	4,252,347	94.04
Paul Hounkpè	Judicael Hounwanou	Cowry Forces for an Emerging Benin	269,433	5.96
Total			4,521,780	100.00
Valid votes			4,521,780	97.47
Invalid/blank votes			117,598	2.53
Total votes			4,639,378	100.00
Registered voters/turnout			7,897,287	58.75
Source: Benin Web TV

== See also ==
- Vice President of Benin
- List of prime ministers of Benin
- List of colonial governors of Dahomey
- Politics of Benin
