= List of presidents of the National Assembly of Benin =

Below is a list of presidents of the National Assembly of Dahomey:

Name	Entered office	Left office	Notes
Justin Ahomadégbé-Tomêtin	24 April 1959	November 1960	
Valentin Djibodé Akplogan	4 November 1960	28 October 1963	
Tahirou Congakou	January 1964	November 1965	

Below is a list of presidents of the Permanent Committee of National Revolutionary Assembly of Benin:

Name	Entered office	Left office	Notes
d'Ignace Adjo Boco	February 1980	17 October 1982	
Romain Vilon Guézo	17 October 1982	28 February 1989	
Romain Vilon Guézo	July 1989	February 1990	
Mgr. Isidore de Souza	28 February 1990	31 March 1991	

Below is a list of presidents of the National Assembly of Benin:

Name	Entered office	Left office	Notes
Adrien Houngbédji	1 April 1991	31 March 1995	
Bruno Amoussou	4 April 1995	19 April 1999	
Adrien Houngbédji	20 April 1999	19 March 2003	
Antoine Idji Kolawolé	22 April 2003	2 March 2007	
Mathurin Nago	2 March 2007	23 May 2015	
Adrien Houngbédji	20 May 2015	18 May 2019	
Louis Vlavonou	18 May 2019	8 February 2026	
Joseph Djogbenou	8 February 2026	Incumbent	
