= Mariam Chabi Talata =

Beninese politician (born 1963)

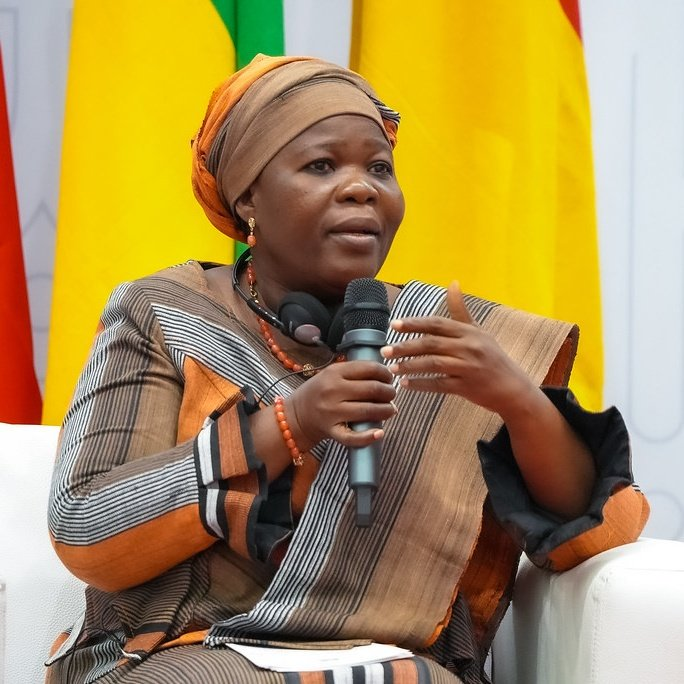
- Talata in 2023

1st Vice President of Benin
- Incumbent
- Assumed office 24 May 2021
- President: Patrice Talon; Romuald Wadagni
- Preceded by: Office established

Personal details
- Born: 7 July 1963 (age 63) Bembéréké, Dahomey
- Party: Progressive Union
- Spouse: Zimé Yérima
- Children: 4
- Education: National University of Benin

Mariam Chabi Talata Zimé Yérima (born 7 July 1963), is a Beninese politician who has been the vice president of Benin since 2021. Prior to her tenure as vice president, she was a member of the National Assembly and a municipal councillor in Parakou.

== Early life and education ==
Mariam Chabi Talata Zimé was born in Bembèrèkè, Benin, on 7 July 1963. She attended Centre D School in Parakou, Camp Guézo School in Cotonou, Gbégamey Middle General Education College, 1st General Middle General Education College, and CEG Akpakpa Centre before completing her secondary education in 1985. She graduated from the National University of Benin with a degree in philosophy in 1988.

== Career ==
=== Education ===
Talata was educated as a teacher at Ecole Normale Supérieure de Porto-Novo and graduated in 1991. She became a certified teacher in 1992, and worked at Collège d'Enseignement Général 1 in Natitingou and CEG 1 in Parakou. She was Delegate Pedagogical Inspector for the Borgou and Alibori departments from 2013 to 2016. In 2016, she was appointed as Director of General Secondary Education.

=== Politics ===
In the 2019 election Talata won a seat in the National Assembly. She was a municipal councillor in Parakou.

Patrice Talon selected Talata as his vice-presidential running mate for the 2021 presidential election. Talon pulled her name out of a hat after being unable to choose from the shortlist of candidates. Talon was from the south of Benin while Talata was from the north. Their ticket won and she was elected as the first Vice President of Benin.

== Personal life ==
Talata married Zimé Yerima, with whom she had four children.

== Works cited ==
=== News ===
- "Présidentielle au Bénin: Talon choisit la vice-présidente de l'Assemblée comme colistière". Radio France Internationale. 24 January 2021. Archived from the original on 27 June 2025.
- Mehouenou, Josué (26 April 2021). "Election de Mariam Chabi Talata aux côtés du chef de l'Etat: Ce qui est attendu de la vice-présidente de la République". La Nation. Archived from the original on 26 January 2023.

=== Web ===
- "Vice President of Benin". Présidence de la République du Bénin. Vice President of Benin. Archived from the original on 27 June 2025.
