= Patrice Talon =

President of Benin from 2016 to 2026

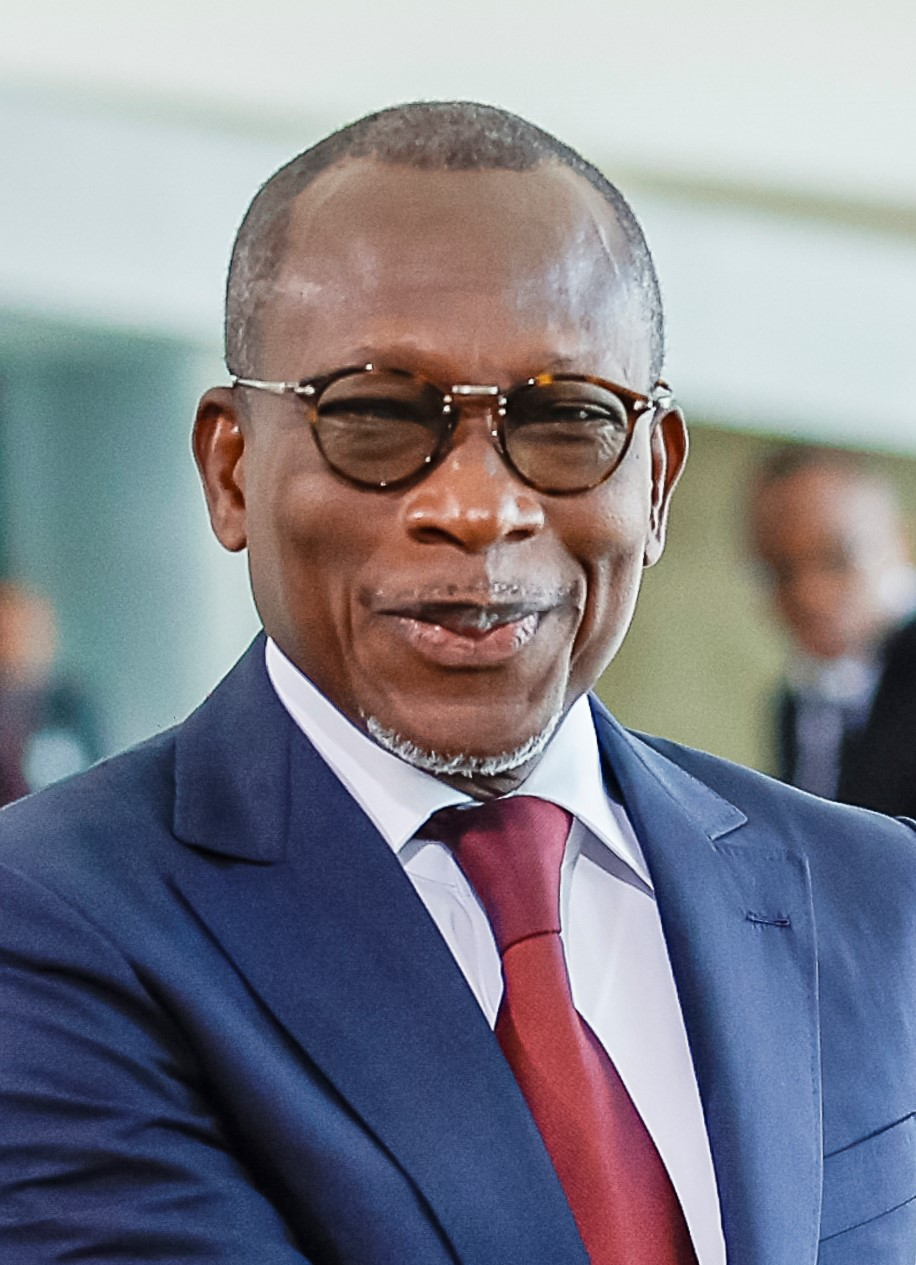
- Talon in 2024

1st President of the Senate
- Incumbent
- Assumed office 6 August 2026
- Preceded by: Office created

8th President of Benin
- In office 6 April 2016 – 24 May 2026
- Vice President: Mariam Chabi Talata
- Preceded by: Thomas Boni Yayi
- Succeeded by: Romuald Wadagni

Senator of Benin
- Incumbent
- Assumed office 30 July 2026

Personal details
- Born: 1 May 1958 (age 68) Ouidah, Dahomey
- Party: Independent
- Spouse: Claudine Gbènagnon
- Children: 2
- Education: University of Dakar; École nationale de l'aviation civile
- Profession: Politician; businessman

Patrice Guillaume Athanase Talon (born 1 May 1958) is a Beninese politician and businessman who has been the first president of the Senate since 2026. He previously served as the eighth president of Benin from 2016 to 2026.

== Early life and career ==
Patrice Guillaume Athanase Talon was born in Ouidah on 1 May 1958, and is of Fon origin. His father was from Ouidah while his mother came from a Guédégbé family in Abomey. After completing secondary school with a baccalauréat, he studied mathematics and physics at the University of Dakar. Talon had ambitions of becoming a pilot in his early years. Following his second year at university, he passed an Air Afrique pilot exam and transferred to the École nationale de l'aviation civile in Paris, but he was ultimately disqualified by a medical test and forced to pursue other options.

In 1983, Talon became involved in trading packaging and agricultural inputs. In 1985, he returned to Benin and established the Intercontinental Distribution Company (Société Distribution Intercontinentale; SDI), supplying agricultural inputs to cotton producers. In 1990, after recommendations by the World Bank to liberalize economies in West African countries, Benin was called upon to withdraw from the cotton production chain. Talon then won the chance to establish three cotton ginning factories in Benin. He was also known as the "King of Cotton" for his involvement in the cotton industry. He built his empire due to connections with the Beninese political class.

Talon was one of President Thomas Boni Yayi's chief financial backers, financing his campaigns in the 2006 and 2011 elections. His company, Benin Control, acquired two nationally owned enterprises, Sodeco in 2009 and PVI in 2011. In 2011, Talon received management of Cotonou's imports at the Port of Cotonou. In 2012, he fled to France after he was accused of embezzling more than 18 million euros in taxes. He fell out with Boni Yayi and was accused of involvement in a plot to kill him. He was pardoned in 2014.

== Presidency (2016–2026) ==
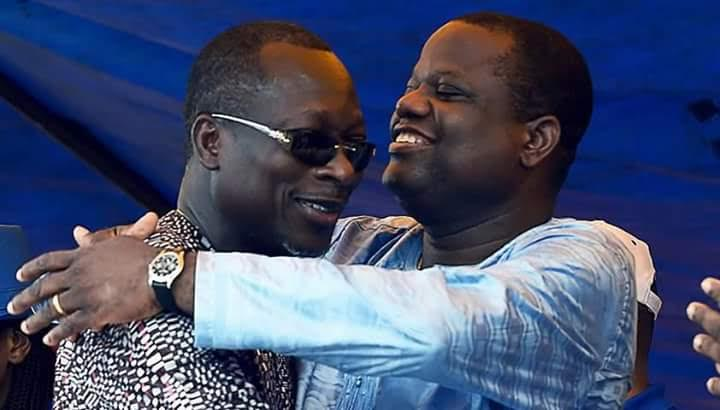
Talon with Sébastien Ajavon during the 2016 presidential election campaign, March 2016

Talon ran as an independent candidate in the March 2016 presidential election. He finished second to Prime Minister Lionel Zinsou of the Cowry Forces for an Emerging Benin in the first round of voting, but won the second round with 65% of the vote. Zinsou conceded on election night. On 25 March 2016, Talon said that he would "first and foremost tackle constitutional reform", discussing his plan to limit presidents to a single term of five years in order to combat "complacency". He also said that he planned to reduce the cabinet from 28 to 16 members.

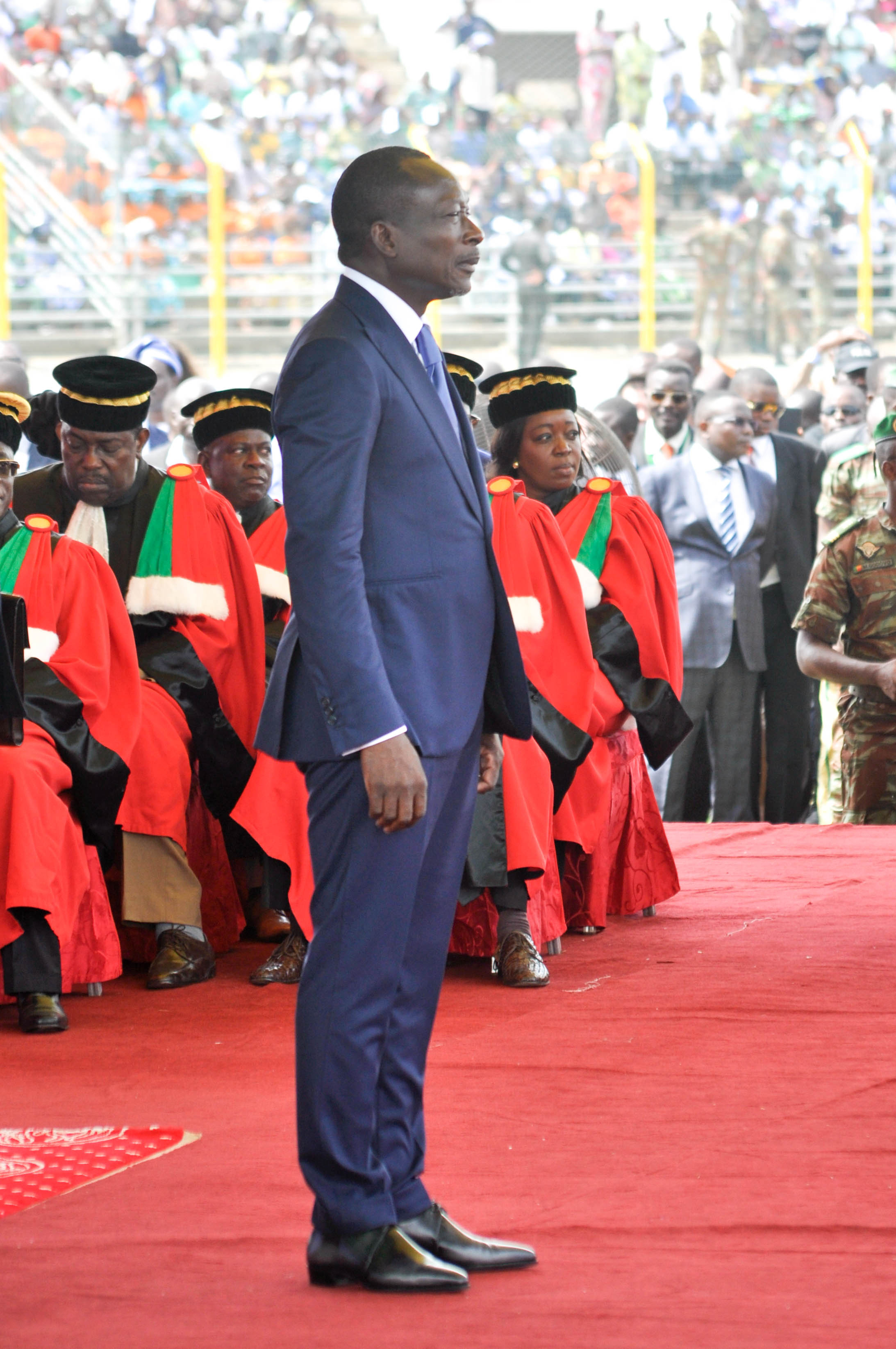
Talon during his first inauguration

Talon was inaugurated as the eighth president of Benin on 6 April 2016. The composition of his government was announced later that day. There was no prime minister, and two defeated presidential candidates who had backed Talon in the second round, Pascal Koupaki and Abdoulaye Bio-Tchane, were appointed to key posts, Secretary-General of the Presidency and Minister of State for Planning and Development, respectively. Talon pledged to increase Benin's fortunes in five years and improve its relationship with France. Some of his policy goals are to reduce the power of the executive and limit presidents to single terms of five years. He appointed 22 ministers, four of which were women.

On 4 April 2017, the National Assembly failed to pass a bill that would have led to a referendum on Talon's proposal to limit presidents to a single five-year term. 63 votes in the 83-member National Assembly were required for passage, and the bill received 60 votes. Talon said a few days later that he would not pursue the matter any further. He said he was saddened by the outcome of the vote but respected it because of his commitment to democracy. He declined to say whether he would stand for reelection in 2021, but eventually it became apparent that he would. Benin's democratic reputation has declined during Talon's presidency. Changes in the law mean that presidential candidates need the support of 16 members of parliament, and nearly all current MPs are members of parties that support Talon. It was predicted that Talon could be reelected unopposed. Ultimately, he was reelected with 86% of the vote.

In 2018, Sébastien Ajavon, an opponent who came third in the 2016 presidential election, was sentenced to 25 years in prison for "drug trafficking" and "forgery and fraud". Several opposition figures were sentenced to heavy prison terms in December 2021. Former Minister of Justice Rekaya Madougou was sentenced to twenty years in prison for "terrorism", and the law professor Joël Aïvo to ten years for "money laundering" and "undermining state security". According to journalist and teacher Francis Kpatindé, Talon's policies have led to a decline in human rights and the right to strike.

In March 2022, Patrice Talon was appointed the new president of the West African Economic and Monetary Union (WAEMU) at the end of a double ECOWAS-WAEMU summit. In July 2023, after the coup d'état in neighboring Niger and the ensuing Nigerien crisis, Talon expressed support for ousted president Mohamed Bazoum and condemned the coup. In September 2024, authorities announced the discovery of a coup plot against Talon, scheduled for 27 September and led by the businessman and Talon ally Olivier Boko. Former sports minister Oswald Homéky and the commander of the Republican Guard were named as co-conspirators, leading to the arrest of Boko and Homéky. Both were convicted and sentenced in January 2025 to 20 years' imprisonment and a fine of 60 billion CFA francs ($95 million).

On 23 January 2025, Talon announced that he would not seek a third presidential term and that he would not amend the constitution (which imposes an absolute two-term limit on the presidency) to do so. On 14 March 2025, Talon reaffirmed that he would not run in the 2026 Beninese presidential election. On 7 December 2025, Talon's residence in Cotonou was attacked, after which a group of soldiers led by Lieutenant Colonel Pascal Tigri announced Talon's overthrow over national television; however, the coup was largely suppressed by government forces later in the day with military assistance from Nigeria and other ECOWAS member-states, and Talon pledged to punish those responsible and other participants.

According to NPR, Talon oversaw a modest economic transformation of Benin following a major investment in infrastructure.

== Post-presidency ==
The Senate was established under a constitutional reform adopted on 18 November 2025 passed by a 90-19 vote in the National Assembly. The then government of Talon said the reform was aimed at strengthening political stability, national unity and the functioning of state institutions, leading to Benin’s transition to a bicameral parliament. The senate was sworn in on 30 July 2026. Talon was elected as the president of Senate in its first inaugural session on 6 August 2026, securing 24 out of 25 votes, and marking a return to the centre of national politics only months after leaving the presidency.

== Personal life ==
Talon is married to Claudine Gbènagnon from Porto-Novo and has two children.

== See also ==
- List of current heads of state and government
- List of heads of the executive by approval rating

Political offices
Preceded by Thomas Boni Yayi	President of Benin; 2016–2026	Succeeded by Romuald Wadagni
