= Government ministers of the People's Republic of Benin =

Mathieu Kérékou governments
- 1st - 4th Cabinets of People's Republic of Benin

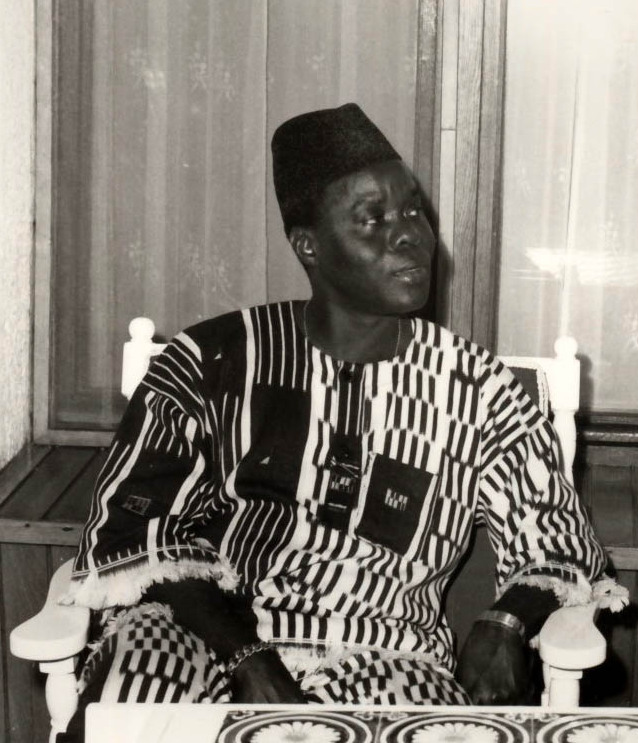
- Date formed: 2 December 1975
- Date dissolved: 2 December 1990

People and organisations
- Head of government: Mathieu Kérékou
- No. of ministers: 15
- Member party: People's Revolutionary Party of Benin

From October 1972 to August 1989, President Mathieu Kérékou, in the management of political power, formed twelve governments. However, the first two governments (1972-1976), each lasting two years, in addition to the third government lasting four years, were composed solely of military personnel. These governments were thus referred to as "Revolutionary Military Government". All civilians were therefore excluded from political power. However, the 1979 cadre conference allowed some intellectuals, particularly teachers, to take an interest in the country's politics. This explains the change in the title of the governments. From then on, they are referred to as the "National Executive Council", and nine governments are formed within this framework. The twelve governments formed comprise a total of two hundred six members.

== Key Ministries ==
The government consisted of:

Portfolio	Minister	Took office	Left office	Party
Ministry of Economy and Finance (Benin)	Isidore Amoussou	October 1974	August 1984	People's Revolutionary Party of Benin
Ministry of Economy and Finance (Benin)	Hospice Antonio	August 1984	February 1987	People's Revolutionary Party of Benin
Ministry of Economy and Finance (Benin)	Barnabé Bidouzo	February 1987	1988	People's Revolutionary Party of Benin
Ministry of Economy and Finance (Benin)	Didier Dassi	August 1988	1990	People's Revolutionary Party of Benin
Ministry of Economy and Finance (Benin)	Idelphonse Lemon	1990	1991	People's Revolutionary Party of Benin
Minister of Foreign Affairs	Michel Alladaye	December 2, 1975	1980	People's Revolutionary Party of Benin
Minister of Foreign Affairs	Simon Ifede Ogouma	1980	1982	People's Revolutionary Party of Benin
Minister of Foreign Affairs	Tiamiou Adjibadé	1982	1984	People's Revolutionary Party of Benin
Minister of Foreign Affairs	Frédéric Affo	1984	1987	People's Revolutionary Party of Benin
Minister of Foreign Affairs	Guy Landry Hazoumé	1987	August 1989	People's Revolutionary Party of Benin
Minister of Foreign Affairs	Daniel Tawéma	August 5, 1989	March 14, 1990	People's Revolutionary Party of Benin
Minister of Foreign Affairs	Théophile Nata	March 14, 1990	December 2, 1990	People's Revolutionary Party of Benin
Minister Delegate in charge of Interior, Security, and National Guidance	Martin Dohou Azonhiho ·	June 20, 1975	February 12, 1980	People's Revolutionary Party of Benin
Minister Delegate in charge of Interior, Security, and National Guidance	Vincent Guezodje ·	February 12, 1980	September 18, 1982	People's Revolutionary Party of Benin
Minister Delegate in charge of Interior, Security, and National Guidance	Michel Alladaye ·	September 18, 1982	August 3, 1984	People's Revolutionary Party of Benin
Minister Delegate in charge of Interior, Security, and National Guidance	Édouard Zodehougan · · ·	August 3, 1984	August 5, 1989	People's Revolutionary Party of Benin
Minister Delegate in charge of Interior, Security, and National Guidance	Pancrace Brathier ·	August 5, 1989	March 14, 1990	People's Revolutionary Party of Benin
Minister Delegate in charge of Interior, Security, and National Guidance	Jean-Florentin Feliho	March 14, 1990	April 4, 1991	People's Revolutionary Party of Benin
Minister of Justice	Moriba Djibril	1976	1980	People's Revolutionary Party of Benin
Minister of Justice	Michel Alladaye	1980	1982	People's Revolutionary Party of Benin
Minister of Justice	Francois Dossou	1983	1984	People's Revolutionary Party of Benin
Minister of Justice	Didier Dassi	1985	1987	People's Revolutionary Party of Benin
Minister of Justice	Saliou Aboudou	1988	1989	People's Revolutionary Party of Benin
Minister of Justice	Yves Yehouessi	1990	1991	People's Revolutionary Party of Benin

== See also ==
- History of Benin
