= Adrien Degbey =

Beninese politician

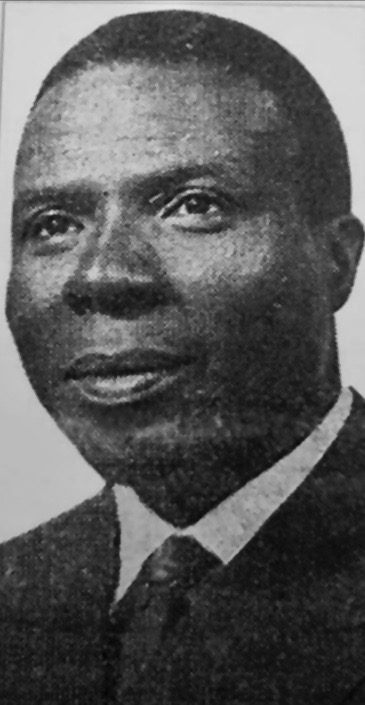

Minister of Rural Development and Cooperation
- In office 27 January 1964 – 1 December 1965
- President: Sourou-Migan Apithy (Resignation); Justin Ahomadégbé (Interim)
- Prime Minister: Justin Ahomadégbé
- Preceded by: Sourou-Migan Apithy
- Succeeded by: Antoine Boya

Minister of Labor and Social Affairs
- In office 11 September 1963 – 27 October 1963
- President: Hubert Maga
- Prime Minister: Hubert Maga
- Preceded by: Bertin Borna
- Succeeded by: Justin Ahomadégbé

Personal details
- Born: Adrien Degbey; 10 May 1918 Dogbo (French Dahomey)
- Died: 14 April 1971 (aged 52)
- Party: Dahomeyan Democratic Party (1963-1965)
- Other political affiliations: Dahomeyan Unity Party (1960-1963); Dahomeyan Progressive Union (1946-1951)
- Education: École normale supérieure William Ponty
- Occupation: Teacher
- Awards: Knight of the Ordre du Mérite social; Knight of the Ordre des Palmes académiques; Officer of the National Order of Dahomey

Adrien Degbey (10 May 1918 – 14 April 1971) was a Dahomeyan politician.

== Biography ==
=== Education and teaching career ===
Adrien Degbey was born on 10 May 1918 in Dogbo in French Dahomey (now known as Benin). He attended Victor Ballot School from 1932 to 1935 and graduated at the top of his class. In 1935, with five classmates including Justin Ahomadégbé, he was shortlisted on the basis of his marks and admitted to the École normale supérieure William Ponty in Gorée in Senegal, known at the time as the principal training ground of the elite from French West Africa.

During his time in college, he discovered acting and studied theatre thanks to Charles Béart, school principal and father of the Ponty theatre. He was a member of the school theatre group with the future Dahomeyan political elite, Hubert Maga, Émile Derlin Zinsou, François Djibodé Aplogan (Note: François Djibodé Aplogan served as a government minister several times.) and Antoine Boya. (Note: Antoine Boya was a senior civil servant and secretary of State.) In 1936, he played a role in Retour aux fétiches délaissés. The play was performed in Gorée and Dakar and was hailed as a success.

Adrien Degbey graduated the École normale with a diploma in Primary Education.

On 16 March 1961, then first-class teacher, he was appointed deputy school inspector and assigned to primary inspection in Porto-Novo district.

He ended his career as principal school inspector.

=== Political career ===
In January 1947, as a member of the Dahomeyan Progressive Union, the largest political party in Dahomey, he was elected for five years to the General Council. He was reelected in 1959 and served until 1960 when the country attained full independence from France.

The political history of the Republic of Dahomey from independence to the early seventies was marked by chronic political instability with numerous coups d'état, coup attempts and cabinet reshuffles. During this time, Adrien Degbey served twice as a government minister.

The first time, he was chosen and appointed minister of Labor and Social Affairs by Hubert Maga on 11 September 1963. He served until 27 October of the same year when Colonel Christophe Soglo, Chief of Staff of the Army, forced the president to resign the office and took control of the country in a bloodless operation in order to prevent a civil war.

One month later, Christophe Soglo offered Adrien Degbey to take part in a national constitutional committee which was composed of "experts, regional representatives, spiritual families, union representatives and youth organizations" in charge of reviewing a draft Constitution proposed by the interim government.

As the colonel dissolved the Dahomeyan Unity Party, sole legal party in the country, on 13 November 1963, Sourou-Migan Apithy and Justin Ahomadégbé founded a new one, the Dahomeyan Democratic Party (DDP) (Note: The Dahomeyan Democratic Party was dissolved by Tahirou Congacou on 4 December 1965.) on 15 December. Adrien Degbey was elected officer of the political bureau as delegate of social affairs.

In his memoirs, Bruno Amoussou related some confessions that Adrien Degbey made regarding this military transition period which led to the Nation's Second Republic. He criticized errors made on various events that happened far too quickly, such as the drafting of a new Constitution in only ten days, the foundation of a new sole legal party in 47 days and the holding of the parliamentary election.

On 5 January 1964, the new Constitution was adopted by referendum and approved by 99.86% of voters.

When the army restored power to civilians, the DDP won the parliamentary election and all 42 seats in the National Assembly on 19 January 1964; Sourou-Migan Apithy became president of a coalition government and Justin Ahomadégbé was designated as premier and vice president on 25 January. Adrien Degbey joined the administration as minister of Rural Development and Cooperation.

Promptly, economic problems, social issues, strikes, differing opinions on politics and irreversible tensions contributed to the government's instability that led to the resignation of Sourou-Migan Apithy on 27 November 1965 and Justin Ahomadégbé's one two days later. As president of the National Assembly, the interim was carried out by Tahirou Congacou who took on the powers of the president of the Republic on 29 November. He formed a restricted cabinet of five members; Antoine Boya succeeded both Adrien Degbey and François Aplogan as secretary of State for Finance, Economy, Rural Development and Cooperation.

But Christophe Soglo (since promoted to the rank of general) was dissatisfied with the actions taken by Tahirou Congacou and decided to remove the latter from power on 22 December 1965. General Soglo took back the presidency until 17 December 1967, when young army officers led by Major Maurice Kouandété overthrew him.

On 25 January 1968, a constitutional committee was mandated by Lieutenant Colonel Alphonse Alley, interim head of State, to draft a Constitution, which would go to a nationwide referendum. Adrien Degbey was part of this 54-member body (Note: The constitutional committee was made up as following: 33 full members, 16 deputy members and 5 government commissioners.) which was composed of people picked for their regional origin and expertise. A new Constitution was written and approved by 846,521-to-71,695 vote on 31 March of the same year.

=== Death ===
Adrien Degbey died in a car accident on 14 April 1971. He received a state funeral.

=== Awards and honors ===
A Middle School founded in 1972 in Sè was named after him.

During his lifetime, Adrien Degbey received these distinctions:

- Medal of Honor for Primary Education (Note: French medal awarded for a minimum of seven years of service as tenured teacher.)
- Knight of the Ordre du Mérite social
- Knight of the Ordre des Palmes académiques
- Officer of the National Order of Dahomey

== See also ==
- 1946–47 Dahomeyan General Council election
- Dahomeyan Democratic Party
