= List of universities in Ivory Coast =

This is a list of universities in Ivory Coast.

== Universities in Ivory Coast ==
- Université Saint-Joseph Côte d’Ivoire USJ - CI
- British institute of management and technology (IBM-T)
- British University- UCL Abidjan
- Catholic University of West Africa (CUWA / UCAO)
- Centre d'animation et de formation pédagogique de Yamoussoukro
- Centre International de Formation à Distance (CIFAD)
- Centre universitaire professionnalisé d'Abidjan
- Ecole de Spécialité Multimédia d'Abidjan
- École nationale supérieure de statistique et d'économie appliquée (Côte d'Ivoire) (ENSEA)
- Ecole Normale Superieure (ENS)
- Ecole Supérieure Africaine des Technologies de l'Information et de la Communication (ESATIC)
- Graduate School of Management (GSM), Abidjan
- HEC Abidjan
- Institut National de la Jeunesse et des sports (INJS)
- Institut Nationale des Arts et de l'Action Culturelle (INSAAC)
- Institut National Polytechnique Félix Houphouët-Boigny (Yamoussoukro) (INPHB)
- Institut Pedagogique National de l'Enseignement Technique et Professionnel (IPNETP)
- Institut Supérieur de Commerce et Administration des Entreprises de Yamoussoukro (ISCAE)
- Institut Supérieur de Technologie de Côte d'Ivoire (ISTCI)
- Institut Supérieur de Technologie Dubass (IST-DUBASS)
- Institut Supérieur des Carrières Commerciales (ISCC)
- Institut universitaire d'Abidjan
- International University of Grand-Bassam (IUGB)
- Jean Lorougnon Guédé University
- Pigier Côte d'Ivoire (formerly Groupe Pigier)
- Pôle Universitaire Canadien d'Afrique de l'Ouest
- The University of Abidjan
- Université Tertiaire et Technologique LOKO
- Université Alassane Ouattara (Bouaké)
- Université d'Abobo-Adjamé
- Université Félix Houphouët-Boigny
- Université Nangui-Abrogoua
- Université Nouvelle de Côte d'Ivoire (UNCI University)
- Université Pelefero Gon Coulibaly (Korhogo)
- University of Science and Technology of Ivory Coast (USTCI)
