= Idaasha people =

Group of the Yoruba people

Idàáshà
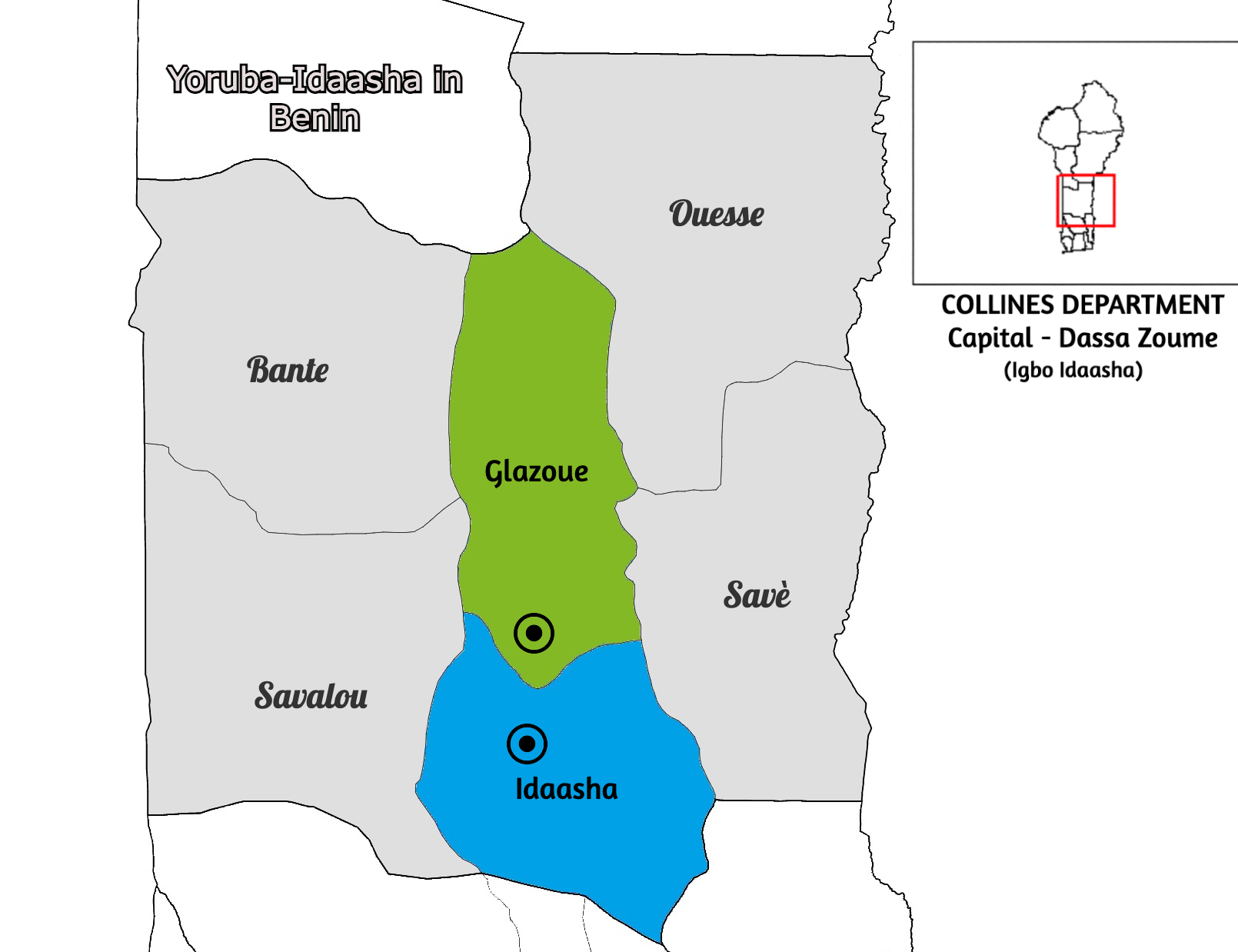
- Idaasha homeland location (Green & Blue) in Benin

Total population
- ~200,000 (2016)

Regions with significant populations
- · Collines Department; Glazoué Arrondissement; Dassa Arrondissement

Religion
- Christianity (Catholic & Protestant) · Yoruba religion · Islam

The Idaasha also spelt Idaaca, Idaaṣa and Idaaitsa are a subgroup of the Yoruba people, situated in the central portions of the Collines Department of Benin, West Africa. They are based in and around the communities of Glazoué (Igbo Omina/Gbomina) and Dassa (Igbo Idaasha) both situated west of the Oueme River. Every year, the Idaasha organize a festival of arts and culture known as FACI (Festival des Arts et Cultures Idaasha) to celebrate their culture and heritage, themed Àshà Ìbílẹ̀ .

== Geography ==
Geographically, Idaashaland is situated in middle Benin, with major link and access roads passing through the major towns and villages, with many located along or close to highway RNIE 2 (Route Nationale Inter-Etats). The Idaasha are bordered by the Shabe-Yoruba to the north and northeast. To the northwest, west and south are the Mahi, a Gbe language speaking group similar to the Fon, and who originate from the Zou Department in the south, while to the Southeast are the southern Anago communities of Ketu and Ewé.

The climate is a tropical wet and dry one, while the predominant vegetation is tropical savannah. The topography of the surrounding region is characterized by plateaus ranging from 20 to 200 m (66 to 656 ft) above the mean sea level, with about 1,200mm of rainfall annually.

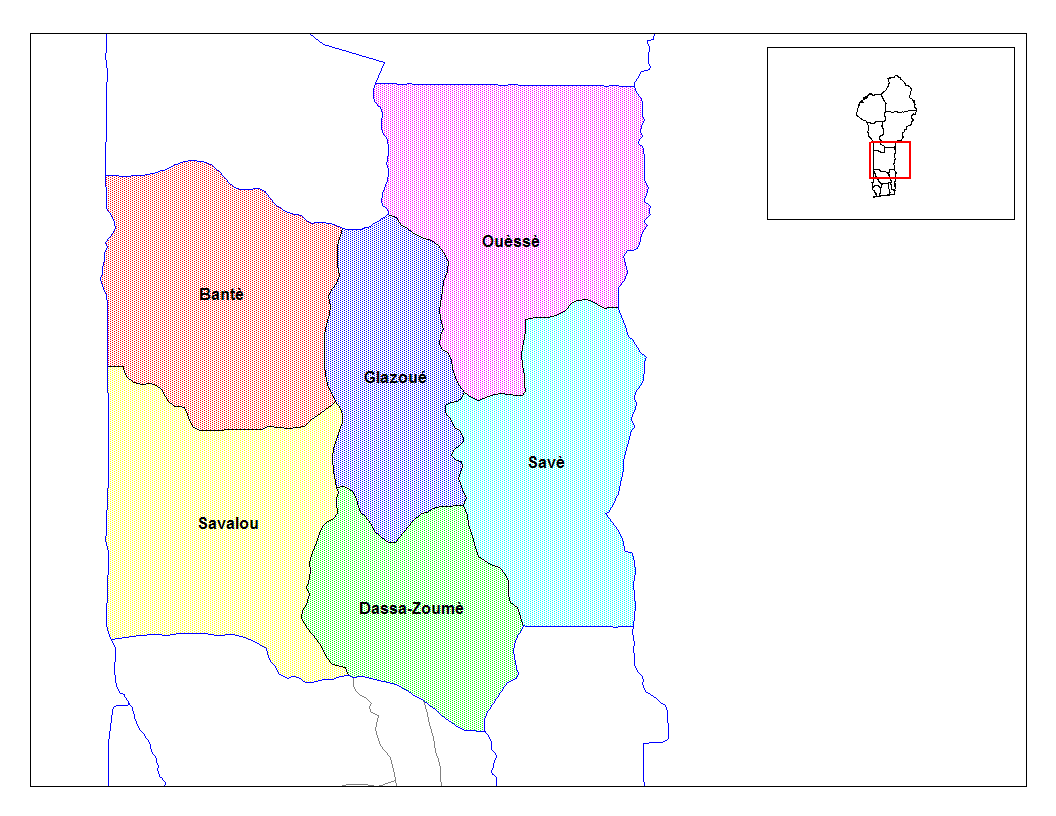
The Glazoue and Dassa Communes within the Collines department of Benin

== History and origin ==
The Idaasha according to their own oral account coalesced into a centralized Kingdom at around the year 1600 when Jagun Olofin, the founder of the current reigning dynasty of Obas migrated into the area from the Egba country in mid-western Yorubaland in an expedition led by Ṣàgbóná. Egbaland at the time was still a provincial region of the Oyo empire, very much earlier than the translocation of the Egbas to their present location along the mid course of the Ogun river and the coalescing of the Egbas under Lisabi Agbongbo Akala which was soon followed by the formation of Abeokuta a few years later. Consequently, even though the Idaasha reigning dynasty originated from the Egbas, Igbo Idaasha town is a much older settlement than Abeokuta, the chief settlement of the Egbas today by more than 200 years.

Idaasha developed into a federation by absorbing the earlier pre-dynastic autochthonous populations based in the hilly outcrops of the area. They were the Epo, Ifita, and the Yaka. The Epos were originally Yorubas from a district of the Oyo empire bearing the same name. The Ifita on the other hand were from Ile-Ife, ultimate cradle of the Yorubas.

John Duncan, a scots member of the Niger expedition of 1841 is recorded to have traversed the area, he subsequently described the inhabitant of the country as Anagoos.

== Settlement and community structure ==
The presently reigning King (Oba) of Igbo Idaasha is Egba Kotan II who ascended the throne on Mar 3 2002. Igbo Idaasha is the larger of the two major Idaasha towns and is a major crossroad town at the node of roads that link the North of Benin to the south of the country. It is situated south of Gbomina (Glazoue). The Glazoue arrondissement encompasses more than 46 villages while the Dassa-Zoume arrondissement comprises more than 66.

Each community/village/town is a commune. Some of these are not composed predominantly of speakers of Ede Idaasha' but rather majority Maxi-Gbe, a dialect of Fon. In Dassa, these include the villages of Gbaffo, Paouignan and Soclogbo, while in Gbomina they are; Aklankpa, Thio, Sante and Ouèdèmè. All the other communes are Idaasha.

== Dialect ==
The Idaasha speak Ede Idaasha, a Yoruba dialect which contains loan words from the neighboring Fon. There are no major variations within the Idaasha dialects, except for the distinction between the phonemes [C] / [TCH] or [TS] as in Idàáchà (The people), Acha (Culture), Ichu (Yam), and Ochu (Month); more common among some more remote segments of the population as against [SH] like in Idaasha, Asha, Ishu and Oshu more common in the major urban centres. Besides Ede Idaasha, Standard Yoruba (SY) is used as a form of 'High Speech' in a form of dialectal diglossia where Ede Idaasha occupies the familiar/nuclear arrangement and SY occupies more formal functions such as Churches (communion, bible studies, prayers, sermons Etc), Mosques, Training programmes and Formal education. Most people understand SY but it isn't the preferred dialectal form spoken or employed in everyday interaction.
