= CIFAD =

Private educational institution headquartered in Ivory Coast

- Centre International de Formation à Distance
- Type: Establishment of distance higher education
- Established: 2010
- Affiliations: Réseau des Universités des Sciences et Technologies des pays d'Afrique au sud du Sahara (RUSTA)
- President: (France) Prof. Serge Percheron
- Location: Abidjan (headquarters), Côte d'Ivoire
- Campus: Four education centers (Abidjan, Lomé, Cotonou and Libreville)
- Website: www.cifad.eu

The CIFAD (International Center for Distance Learning, or in French: Centre International de Formation à Distance) is a private institution in West Africa whose headquarters are in the district of Cocody in Abidjan, the economic capital of Côte d'Ivoire.

== History and mission ==
Created in 2010 by the Network of Universities of Science and Technology of the Countries of Africa south of the Sahara (French: Réseau des Universités des Sciences et Technologies des pays d'Afrique au sud du Sahara (RUSTA)), the CIFAD is an establishment of distance higher education whose role is to disseminate Internet training programs and education resources in economics, management, electronics, mining engineering, civil engineering, etc.

The CIFAD prepares graduates some of which are recognized by the African and Malagasy Council for Higher Education (French: Conseil Africain et Malgache pour l'Enseignement Supérieur (CAMES)).

== International cooperation ==
The CIFAD is the result of an academic "North-South" cooperation that has developed partnerships with international entities, including

- University of Nantes
- University of Orléans
- University of Poitiers
- University of Tours
- University of Science and Technology of Benin
- University of Science and Technology of Ivory Coast
- Higher Institute of Technology of Ivory Coast
- University of Bouaké
