= 1964 Dahomeyan parliamentary election =

- 19 January 1964
- All 42 seats in the National Assembly; 22 seats needed for a majority
Party	Leader	Vote %	Seats	+/–
PDD	Sourou-Migan Apithy	100	42	New
This lists parties that won seats. See the complete results below.

Parliamentary elections were held in the Republic of Dahomey on 19 January 1964. They followed a coup in October 1963 and a subsequent constitutional referendum on 5 January 1964. The Dahomeyan Democratic Party (PDD) was the only party to contest the elections, and won all 42 seats in the National Assembly. Elections were held in the context of which took place on 28 October.

The leader of the winning party would automatically become president. As head of the PDD list, Sourou-Migan Apithy was elected who previously served as one of ministers in the post-coup transitional government of Christophe Soglo. Justin Ahomadégbé-Tomêtin was elected as deputy president of the republic and prime minister. He formed a new government on 25 January.

== Results ==
Party	Votes	%	Seats	+/–
Dahomeyan Democratic Party	995,929	100.00	42	New
Total	995,929	100.00	42	–18
Registered voters/turnout	1,055,910	–		
Source: Nohlen et al.

=== List of MPs elected ===
Members of the National Assembly
Saïbou Adamon
Robert Adamon
Louis Abadje
Olivier Agbo-Houi
Nestor Ahouangnivo
Karl Ahouansou
Justin Atchamou
Prosper Azadji
Yabi Azaria
Césaire Bada
Barnabé Béhanzin
Barthélemy Bourou
Salomon Biokou
Antoine Boulga
Tahirou Congacou
Issaka Dangou
Emmanuel Dideh
Alou Djaouga
Samuel Detinho
Benoît Djikpesse
Edmond Dossou-Yovo
Benoît Ezin
Emmanuel Fanyo
Antoine Fidegnon
Antoine Gnaho
Jules Guezo
Joseph Hodonou
François Hounkpe
Joseph Keke
Gilbert Kpakpo
Donatien Kpodouhoun
Roger Lafia
Joseph Langanfin Glele
Yessoufou Maiguizo Diaouga
Pierre Nouatin
Félicien N'Koue
Jean Pliya
Georges Sakponou
Louis Sego Sounou
Fidèle Tantougoute
Noël Totah
Ali Zato

== Bureau of the National Assembly ==
Elected on 24 January 1964, the Bureau of the National Assembly is composed as follows:

President	Tahirou Congacou
First vice president	Gilbert Kpakpo
Second vice president	Salomon Biokou
Third vice president	Issaka Dangou
Secretaries	Jean Pliya Mohamed Lawahi Batoko Emmanuel Fanyo
Quaestor	Prosper Azadji
Deputy Quaestor	Roger Lafia
