= List of ambassadors of Benin to the United States =

Coordinates: 38.918056°N 77.049056°W

Ambassador of Benin to the United States Embassy of Benin in Washington, D.C.
- Incumbent; M. Jean-Claude do Rego since 2019
- Inaugural holder: Louis Ignacio-Pinto
- Formation: April 17, 1961

The Beninese ambassador in Washington, D. C. is the official representative of the Government in Porto-Novo to the Government of the United States.

== List of representatives ==
Diplomatic agreement/designated	Diplomatic accreditation	Ambassador	Observations	List of presidents of Benin	List of presidents of the United States	Term end
April 17, 1961			EMBASSY OPENED	Hubert Maga	John F. Kennedy	
March 14, 1961	April 17, 1961	Louis Ignacio-Pinto		Hubert Maga	John F. Kennedy	
May 1, 1967	May 10, 1967	Maxime-Léopold Zollner de Medeiros	(*October 4, 1934	Alphonse Alley	Lyndon B. Johnson	
September 21, 1970	September 21, 1970	Wilfred Raoul Eugène de Souza	(*18 April 1935 in Ouidah) de Souza was educated at the University of Paris, following which he	Hubert Maga	Richard Nixon	
March 20, 1973	April 9, 1973	Tiamiou Adjibadé	1977 ambassador Bonn	Mathieu Kérékou	Richard Nixon	
October 15, 1975		Saturnin Kaori Koaovi Soglo	Chargé d'affaires Brother of Nicephore Soglo.: From 1977 to 1990 to 1995 he was ambassador in Bonn.; studied political science at École nationale d'administration publique en Paris; In 1969 entered the foreign service.; From 1971-76 he was Chef de presidential protocol.; He was member of embassy in Washington. From April 4, 1991 he was secretary of state.	Mathieu Kérékou	Gerald Ford	
November 30, 1975		Name changed to People’s Republic of Benin		Mathieu Kérékou	Gerald Ford	
January 9, 1976	January 23, 1976	Setondji Thomas Boya		Mathieu Kérékou	Gerald Ford	
June 2, 1983	June 16, 1983	Guy-Landry Hazoume	Benin's foreign minister	Mathieu Kérékou	Ronald Reagan	
June 20, 1988	July 5, 1988	Theophile Nata		Mathieu Kérékou	Ronald Reagan	
February 28, 1990		Name changed to Republic of Benin		Mathieu Kérékou	George H. W. Bush	
August 27, 1990	October 24, 1990	Candide Pierre Ahouansou		Mathieu Kérékou	George H. W. Bush	
November 9, 1994	November 21, 1994	Lucien Edgar Tonoukouin		Nicéphore Soglo	Bill Clinton	
February 21, 2001	March 13, 2001	Segbe Cyrille Oguin		Mathieu Kérékou	George W. Bush	
May 16, 2014	May 21, 2014	Omar Arouna		Boni Yayi	Barack Obama	
November 28, 2016		Hector S. R. F. Posset			Barack Obama	
