= Théodore Holo =

Beninese politician, academic and judge

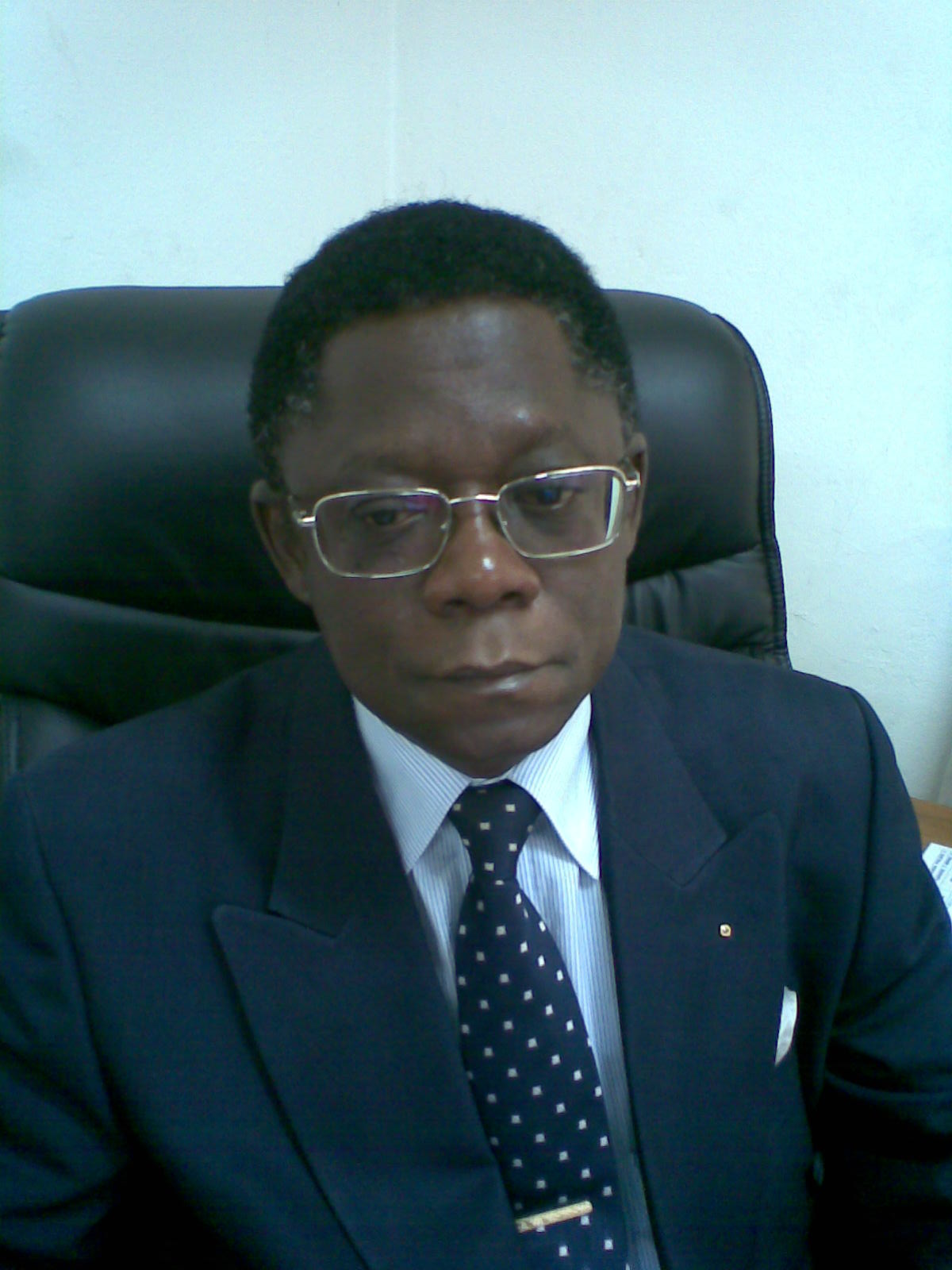
Holo in 2010

Théodore Holo (born 15 April 1948) is a Beninese politician, academic, and judge. He was the foreign minister of Benin from 1991 to 1992.

Born in Porto Novo and educated abroad, Holo taught at the Ecole Nationale d'Administration from 1979 to 1985. He accepted a professorship in international relations and constitutional law at the Université Nationale du Bénin in 1986. He simultaneously served as deputy director of the Ecole Nationale d'Administration and became the director in 1989. The following year, Holo was appointed deputy secretary general of the Haut Conseil de la Republique du Benin, supervising multiparty elections in 1991. After being foreign minister, he was justice and international relations minister and spokesman for Nicephore Soglo's government. He returned to teaching in 1996 and earned the UNESCO Human Rights and Democracy chair of the Université d'Abomey-Calavi. Holo joined the Benin Constitutional Court on 7 June 2008 and became the chairman of the Haute Cour de Justice on 24 June 2009.

== Notes ==
Political offices
Preceded by Théophile Nata	Foreign Minister of Benin; 1991–1992	Succeeded by Saturnin Soglo
