= Paulette Marcelline Adjovi =

Beninese politician (born 1955)

Minister of Foreign Affairs of Benin
- In office 23 May 2023 – 6 June 2023
- President: Patrice Talon
- Preceded by: Aurélien Agbénonci
- Succeeded by: Shegun Adjadi Bakari

Personal details
- Education: University of Abomey-Calavi; West London Institute of Higher Education

Paulette Marcelline Adjovi-Yekpe (born 16 January 1955) is a Beninese politician and diplomat. She was briefly Minister of Foreign Affairs in 2023.

== Biography ==
Adjovi was born on 16 January 1955, in Porto-Novo, Benin. Prior to her appointment, Adjovi served as Beninese ambassador to Nigeria. She is the sister of former deputy Mathieu Adjovi. She is the second woman to serve in the position, after Mariam Aladji Boni Diallo.
