= USTB =

USTB may refer to:

- University of Science and Technology Beijing
- University of Science and Technology of Benin
- Unión Social de Trabajadores de Bolivia, i.e. Workers Social Union of Bolivia
- Ultra Short Term Bonds
