= Minister of Foreign Affairs (Benin) =

Government ministry of Benin

The Minister of Foreign Affairs of Benin (known as Dahomey in 1960–75 and as the People's Republic of Benin in 1975–90) is a government minister in charge of the Ministry of Foreign Affairs of Benin, responsible for conducting foreign relations of the country.

The following is a list of foreign ministers of Benin since its founding in 1960:

- 1960............ Chabi Mama
- 1960–1962: Assogba Oké
- 1962–1963: Émile Derlin Zinsou
- 1963............ Hubert Maga
- 1963–1964: Chabi Mama
- 1964–1965: Gabriel Lozès
- 1965............ Tahirou Congacou (acting)
- 1965–1967: Émile Derlin Zinsou
- 1967–1968: Benoît Sinzogan
- 1968–1969: Daouda Badarou
- 1969–1970: Benoît Sinzogan
- 1970–1971: Daouda Badarou
- 1971–1972: Michel Ahouanmènou
- 1972: Michel Toko (acting)
- 1972–1980: Michel Alladaye
- 1980–1982: Simon Ifede Ogouma
- 1982–1984: Tiamiou Adjibadé
- 1984–1987: Frédéric Affo
- 1987–1989: Guy Landry Hazoumé
- 1989–1990: Daniel Tawéma
- 1990–1991: Théophile Nata
- 1991–1992: Théodore Holo
- 1992–1993: Saturnin Soglo
- 1993–1995: Robert Dossou
- 1995–1996: Edgar Yves Monnou
- 1996–1998: Pierre Osho
- 1998–2003: Antoine Idji Kolawolé
- 2003............ Joseph Gnonlonfoun (acting)
- 2003–2006: Rogatien Biaou
- 2006............ Frédéric Dohou (acting)
- 2006–2007: Mariam Aladji Boni Diallo
- 2007–2008: Moussa Okanla
- 2008–2011: Jean-Marie Ehouzou
- 2011–2015: Nassirou Bako Arifari
- 2015–2016: Saliou Akadiri
- 2016–2023: Aurélien Agbénonci
- 2023–July 2023: Paulette Marcelline Adjovi
- July 2023–............: Shegun Adjadi Bakari
