= Dahomeyan Democratic Party =

Dahomeyan Democratic Party Parti Démocratique Dahoméen
- Leader: Sourou-Migan Apithy; Justin Ahomadégbé-Tomêtin
- Founded: 15 December 1963
- Dissolved: 4 December 1965
- Preceded by: Dahomeyan Unity Party
- Headquarters: Porto-Novo, Dahomey
- Ideology: African nationalism Pro-private ownership Welfarism; Anti-colonialism

The Dahomeyan Democratic Party (French: Parti Démocratique Dahoméen, PDD) was the sole legal political party in Dahomey from 1963 until 1965.

== History ==
The PDD was established on 15 December 1963 by Sourou-Migan Apithy and Justin Ahomadégbé-Tomêtin following the overthrow of President Hubert Maga in a coup, and replaced the Dahomeyan Unity Party as the country's sole legal party. The party largely represented the interests of the Aja, Fon, Nago and Yoruba people of the south and central parts of the country.

The 18 officers of the political bureau elected during the PDD Constituent Congress, included:

Secretary general	Gabriel Lozès
Assistant secretary general	Tahirou Congacou
Political advisers	Sourou-Migan Apithy, Justin Ahomadégbé, Paul Hazoumé
Delegate for social affairs	Adrien Degbey

The party won all 42 seats in the 1964 elections. However, when tensions and instability led Sourou-Migan Apithy and Justin Ahomadégbé to resign by the end of November 1965, Tahirou Congacou, president of the National Assembly, assumed the role of interim head of State and dissolved the party on 4 December 1965.

== Election results ==
=== National Assembly ===
Election	Leader	Votes	%	Seats	+/–	Position	Government
1964	Sourou-Migan Apithy	995,929	100%	42 / 42	▲42	▲1st	Sole legal party
