= University of Science and Technology of Togo =

- Université des Sciences et Technologies du Togo (UST-TG)
- Type: Private university
- Established: 2012; 14 years ago
- Affiliations: Réseau des Universités des Sciences et Technologies des pays d'Afrique au sud du Sahara (RUSTA)
- President: Prof. Dieudonné Gumedzoé
- Location: Lomé, Togo; 6.1814°N 1.1726°E
- Campus: Noukafou

The University of Science and Technology of Togo (French: Université des Sciences et Technologies du Togo (UST-TG)) is a private university in West Africa whose headquarters are in Lomé, the capital of Togo.

== History ==
The Université des Sciences et Technologies du Togo is a university institution for scientific, cultural and professional character, enjoying corporate personality, pedagogical and scientific, administrative and financial autonomy. It contributes to the missions of higher education and scientific research through five Faculties and one University Institute for Technology.

The UST-TG is a member institution of the Network of Universities of Science and Technology of the Countries of Africa south of the Sahara (French: Réseau des Universités des Sciences et Technologies des pays d'Afrique au Sud du Sahara (RUSTA)).

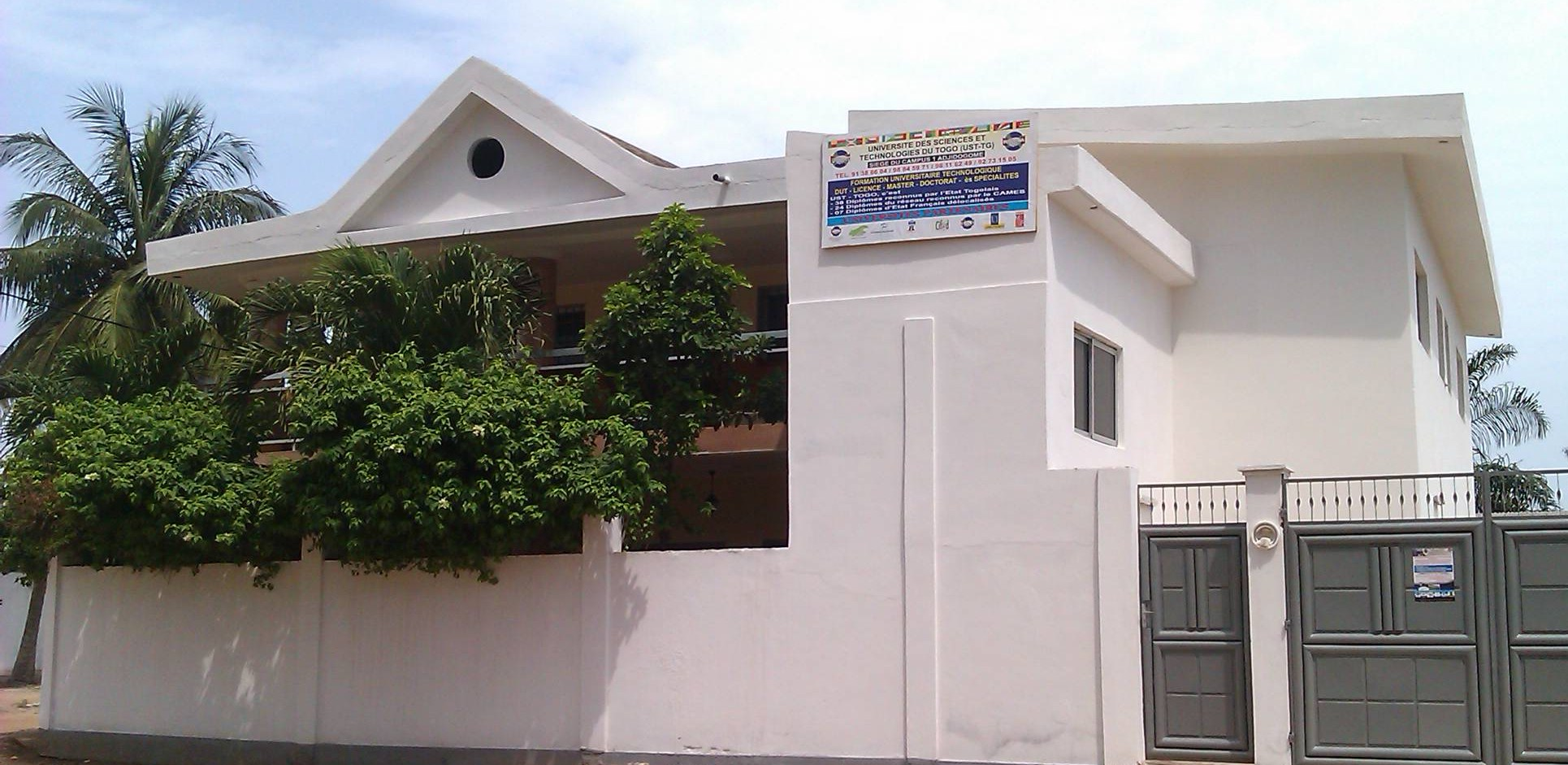
University of Science and Technology of Togo - Adidogomé, Lomé

== Organization ==
The UST-TG has five faculties, one university institute for technology and one research center:

=== Faculties ===
- Faculty of Legal, Administrative and Political
- Faculty of Economics
- Faculty of Management Sciences
- Faculty of Fundamental and Applied Sciences
- Faculty of Letters, Arts and Social Sciences

=== Institute ===
- University Institute for Technology

=== Research centre ===
- Consortium for the Management of Basic and Applied Research in Africa south of the Sahara (French: Consortium pour le Management de la Recherche Fondamentale et Appliquée en Afrique au sud du Sahara (COMREFAS))
