= COMREFAS =

Ivorian research consortium

- Consortium pour le Management de la Recherche Fondamentale et Appliquée en Afrique au Sud du Sahara
- Established: 2009
- Research type: Basic and applied research
- Field of research: Economics, Management Science, Public and Private Law, Humanities, Arts and Social Sciences, Applied Science and Technology
- President: (Ivory Coast) Prof. Kouakou N'Guessan François
- Location: Abidjan, Ivory Coast
- Affiliations: Réseau des Universités des Sciences et Technologies des pays d'Afrique au sud du Sahara
- Website: www.rusta-comrefas.org

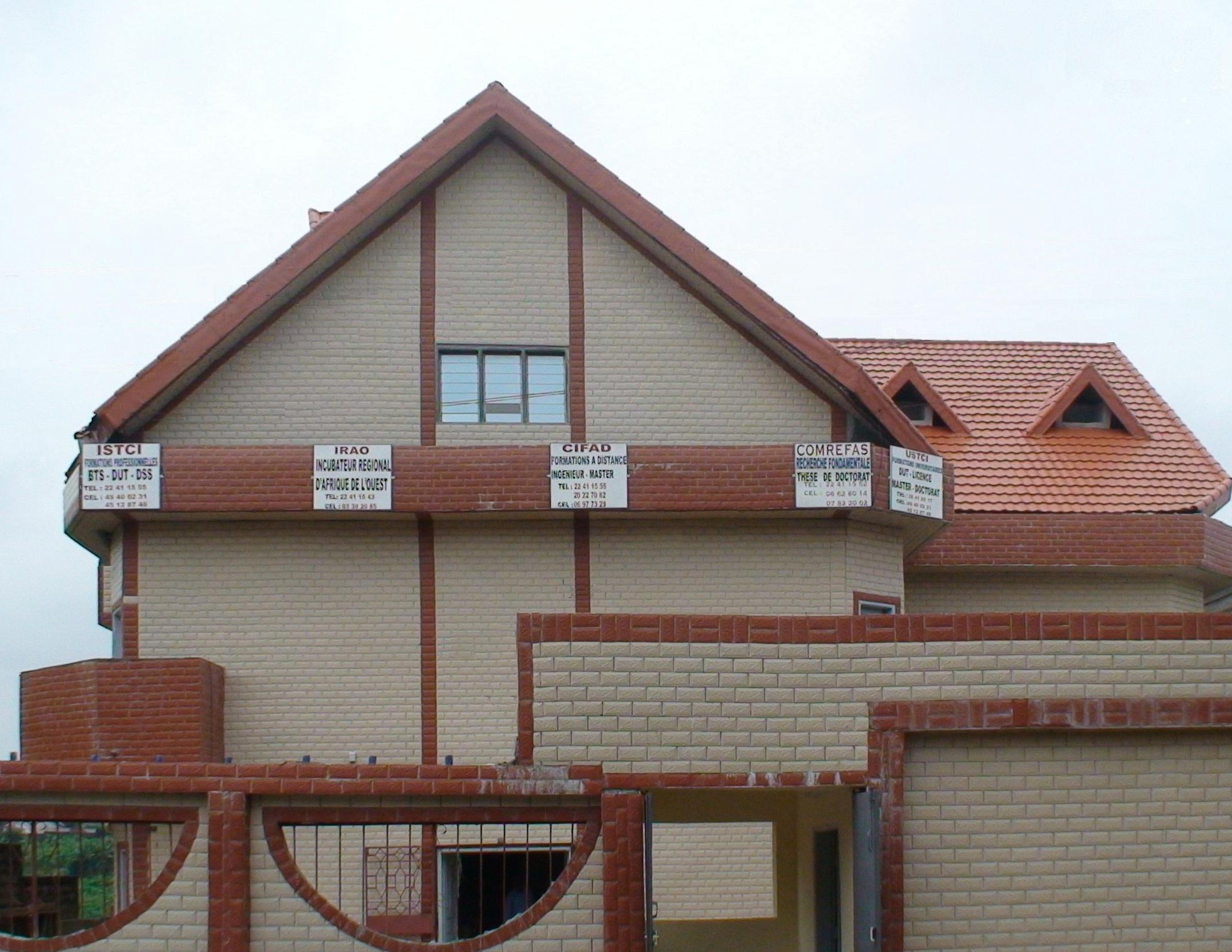
COMREFAS headquarters in the Cocody district of Abidjan, Côte d'Ivoire

The Consortium for the Management of Basic and Applied Research in Africa south of Sahara (French: Consortium pour le Management de la Recherche Fondamentale et Appliquée en Afrique au Sud du Sahara) or COMREFAS is an international multidisciplinary institution whose purpose is to structure and enhance the basic and applied research in Africa in the following scientific fields:

- Economics,
- Management Science,
- Public law,
- Private Law,
- Humanities,
- Arts,
- Social Sciences,
- Applied Science and Technology.

== History ==
Created in 2009 by the Network of Universities of Science and Technology of the Countries of Africa south of the Sahara (RUSTA), the COMREFAS is the research center common to all member institutions of the RUSTA (University of Science and Technology of Benin, University of Science and Technology of Togo, University of Science and Technology of Ivory Coast, Higher Institute of Technology of Ivory Coast, etc.).

Its head office is located in Abidjan, the economic capital of Ivory Coast.

== Mission ==
The COMREFAS's mission is to contribute to the development and enhancement of scientific research in the countries of Africa. This is part of a desire to unite the scientific community around a shared vision, challenging and promising future for African societies.

To do this, the COMREFAS promote:

- the academic and scientific cooperation
- exchanges with organizations and institutions
- dissemination of knowledge through scientific meetings
- the training of doctoral students

== Components ==
The COMREFAS consists of five research laboratories:

- Research Laboratory in Management of Organizations (LAREGO)
- Laboratory of Applied Studies and Research in Public and Private Law (LAREAD)
- Laboratory of Experimental Studies in Economics (LAEXSE)
- Multidisciplinary Laboratory Experiments in Social Sciences (LAPLESS)
- Multidisciplinary Research Laboratory Applied Science and Technologies (LAPRESTA)
