= Jean-Marie Ehouzou =

Beninese diplomat

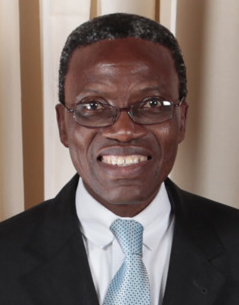

Minister of Foreign Affairs of Benin
- In office 2008–2011
- Preceded by: Moussa Okanla
- Succeeded by: Nassirou Bako Arifari

Jean-Marie Ehouzou (born September 1950) is a Beninese diplomat who has served as the Permanent Representative of the African Union to the United Nations Office at Geneva since 2012. Previously he was Benin's Permanent Representative to the United Nations from 2006 to 2008 and Minister of Foreign Affairs of Benin from 2008 to 2011.

== Life and career ==
Ehouzou served in the Beninese Ministry of Foreign Affairs as deputy director for Africa and Middle East Affairs and deputy director for the Communities from 1993 to 1996 and in the Ministry of Planning, Economic Restructuring and Promotion of Employment as Director for the Coordination of External Resources from 1996 to 2000. He was then Director for International Organizations from 2000 to 2003 before becoming the Ambassador to Ethiopia, Kenya, Sudan, and Djibouti in 2003; he remained in those posts until 2006. He was also Permanent Representative to the African Union and the United Nations Economic Commission for Africa at that time.

Ehouzou was subsequently appointed Permanent Representative to the United Nations, and he presented his credentials to the UN Secretary-General on 29 September 2006.

After two years as Permanent Representative, Ehouzou was appointed by President Yayi Boni as Minister of Foreign Affairs, African Integration, La Francophonie, and Beninese Abroad on 22 October 2008. He was appointed Permanent Representative of the African Union to the United Nations Office at Geneva in August 2011 and took office in 2012.

Political offices
Preceded by Moussa Okanla	Foreign Minister of Benin; 2008–2011	Succeeded by Nassirou Bako Arifari
