= RUSTA =

Africa's private Institution

Network of Universities of Science and Technology of the Countries of Africa south of the Sahara
- Réseau des Universités des Sciences et Technologies des pays d'Afrique au Sud du Sahara (RUSTA)
- Type: Network of private universities
- Established: 2009
- President: (Benin) Prof. Frédéric Dohou
- Location: Abidjan (headquarters), Ivory Coast; Benin; Burkina Faso; Chad; Gabon; Ghana; Guinea; Guinea-Bissau; Mali; Niger; Senegal; Togo
- Website: www.rusta-univ.org

The Network of Universities of Science and Technology of the Countries of Africa south of the Sahara (French: Réseau des Universités des Sciences et Technologies des pays d'Afrique au Sud du Sahara) or RUSTA is a network of private institutions of higher education and research whose headquarters is located in Abidjan, the economic capital of Côte d'Ivoire.

== History ==
Founded in 2009, the RUSTA consists of universities and institutes of higher education located in sub-Saharan Africa who have come together to pool their capacities for teaching and scientific research.

The board of the RUSTA is currently chaired by Frederic Dohou.

== Missions ==
The RUSTA tasks:

- Promote academic and scientific excellence by building a common policy on university education and scientific research,
- Make available to member institutions of financial, human and material resources for their development,
- Train future leaders of institutions and organizations capable of meeting the challenges socio-economic of the African continent,
- Promote international cooperation.

== Members ==
The RUSTA consists of institutions located in West Africa, including:

- Higher Institute of Technology of Ivory Coast (IST-CI)
- University of Science and Technology of Ivory Coast (UST-CI)
- University of Science and Technology of Togo (UST-TG)
- University of Science and Technology of Benin (USTB)
- International Center for Distance Learning (CIFAD)
- Consortium for the Management of Basic and Applied Research in Africa south of the Sahara (COMREFAS)
- Regional incubator for West Africa (IRAO)
- Etc.
