= Joseph Gnonlonfoun =

Beninese politician and diplomat

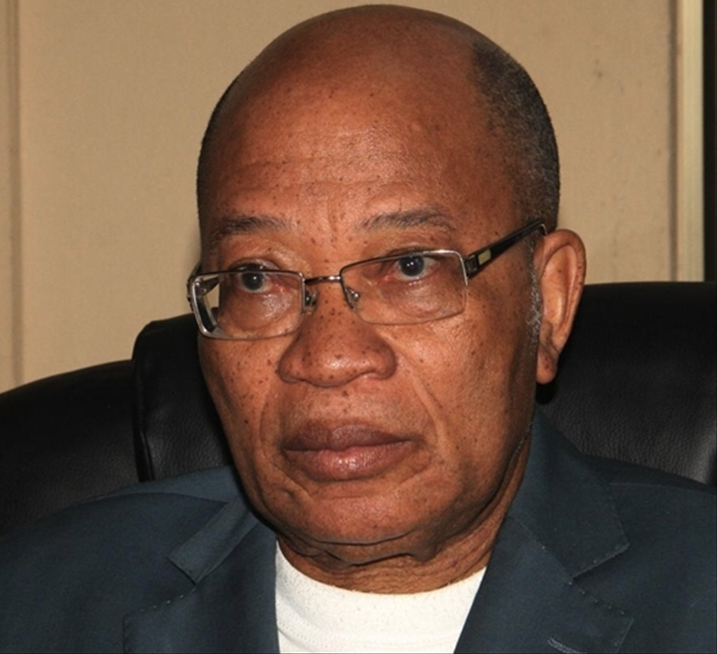
Image of Joseph Gnonlonfoun

Joseph Houessou Gnonlonfoun (born 1943) is a Beninese politician and diplomat.

Gnonlonfoun was born in Porto Novo and was educated locally and abroad. He was an associate of Albert Tévoédjrè and chaired his political party Ensemble National. Gnonlonfoun was the vice-president of the Cotonou Court of First Instance between 1970 and 1970 and substitute member of the Superior Council of Magistracy in 1973. Between 1980 and 1982 he was a political prisoner in military camps. He was Secretary General of the Beninese Human Rights Commission (CBHD) from 1989 to 1991 and served in the National Assembly from 1991 to 1995. He spent years working as a legal consultant for World Bank (1995-1997) and the Inter-Parliamentary Union in Geneva (1996-1998). Gnonlonfoun served as the justice minister under Mathieu Kérékou from 1998 to 2003. He was the foreign minister of Benin in 2003.

In 2011, Gnonlonfoun was named in charge of the electoral commission by President Thomas Boni Yayi and was accused of engineering Boni Yayi's victory. He is currently the mediator of the Beninese Republic. Joseph Gnonlonfoun has 3 children.

Political offices
Preceded by Antoine Idji Kolawolé	Foreign Minister of Benin; 2003	Succeeded by Rogatien Biaou
