= Michel Ahouanmènou =

Beninese politician and diplomat

Michel Ahouanmènou (23 December 1916 – 1979) was a Beninese politician and diplomat, most active when his country was known as Dahomey.

Ahouanmènou was born on 23 December 1916, in Porto-Novo into an influential family. He was a civil service officer for several years and became a strong supporter of Sourou-Migan Apithy. Ahouanmènou was elected to Dahomey's General Council in 1946, representing Porto-Novo. He served as a deputy in the Afrique Occidentale Francaise from 1957 until 1959. Despite rising opposition to Apithy within the Republican Party of Dahomey in 1959, Ahouanmènou stayed loyal to Apithy. Between 1959 and 1961, Ahouanmènou was a senator in the Communauté française.

In 1960, when Dahomey achieved independence, President Hubert Maga appointed Ahouanmènou the minister of youth and sports. Later that year, Maga appointed Ahouanmènou the minister of education, a post he held until 1963. Ahouanmènou became the director of President Apithy's cabinet from 1964 to 1965 and was again minister of education under General Christophe Soglo from 1966 until 1967. He served as ambassador to France from 1967 to 1971 and Great Britain from 1969 to 1971. He held the post of foreign minister under the Presidential Council government from 1971 to 1972 but was dismissed when Mathieu Kérékou took power by force. After the 1972 coup d'état, Ahouanmènou was accused of embezzlement and jailed briefly, though he was later absolved of all charges. Ahouanmènou died in 1979.

== Notes ==
Political offices
Preceded by Daouda Badarou	Foreign Minister of Benin; 1971–1972	Succeeded by Michel Alladaye
