= 1963 Dahomeyan coup d'état =

Coup d'état

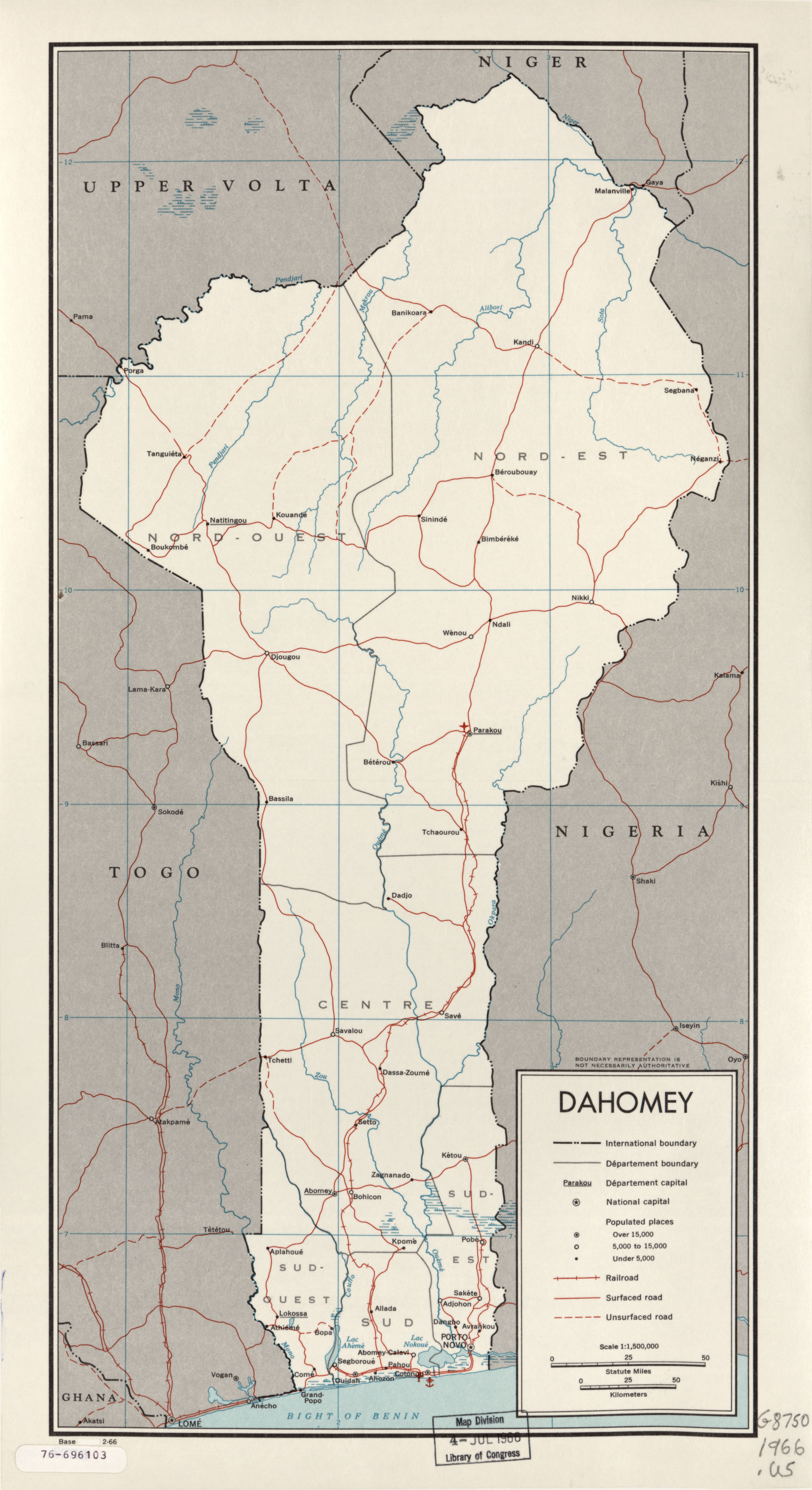
Date	October 28, 1963
Location	Republic of Dahomey
Status	Ended

Belligerents
Government of Benin (Cristophe Soglo faction)	Government of Benin (Hubert Maga faction)

Commanders and leaders
(Benin) Christophe Soglo	(Benin) Hubert Maga

The 1963 Dahomeyan coup d'état was staged on October 28, 1963, by Christophe Soglo, who took control of the Republic of Dahomey to prevent a civil war. He overthrew Hubert Maga, whose presidency faced extreme economic stagnation and a host of other problems.

== Background ==
The West African colony of French Dahomey, the present-day nation of Benin, was largely ignored by the French during its colonial era in French West Africa. Dahomey had a weak economy due to a lack of known natural resources. The last time the colony had a favorable trade balance was in 1924. Its main export was intellectuals, and was known as the Latin Quarter of Africa due to its rich cultural landscape. On August 1, 1960, Dahomey gained its independence and prominent politician Hubert Maga was chosen as its first president. At the time, Dahomey was also facing a major economic recession and after independence, France stopped subsidies. Maga helped counter this by investing in infrastructure and encouraging civil servants to take Dahomey as their residence. Still, Dahomey's GDP grew by 1.4 percent annually from 1957 to 1965, making Dahomey's economy one of the weakest in Africa.

The economic stagnation triggered intense regionalistic attitudes in Dahomey. Parties epitomising the idea began with the 1951 French National Assembly elections. Capitalising on growing cynicism for the domination of southern Dahomey in the French colony's politics, Maga allied himself with the northern tribes. Sourou-Migan Apithy, whom academic Samuel Decalo described as "the grandfather of Dahomeyan politics", kept the second seat, which he had first won in 1945. Apithy represented the people living in southeast Benin, while a third figure, Justin Ahomadégbé-Tomêtin, represented the southwest. Attempts to counteract regionalism failed, as did the establishment of a one-party state. Coalitions between Maga, Apithy, and Ahomadégbé-Tomêtin were similarly unsuccessful, as each sought absolute power.

In early 1961, the president began applying repressive measures on the opposition press and anyone suspected of trouble-making, thus practically eliminated Ahomadégbé-Tomêtin's voice in the country. By April, most Dahomeyan Democratic Union (UDD) members had expressed interest in joining the Dahomeyan Unity Party, and Maga not only supported this but encouraged it. A notable exception was Ahomadégbé-Tomêtin himself. The choice was soon made for him; the entire UDD was dissolved by Maga on April 11. Maga then attempted to design a four-year growth plan, to begin on January 1, 1962, that contained many ambitious acts. It was designed to increase yield in agriculture and was financed by French capital. Part of the plan was to cut all wages by ten percent. Young Dahomeyans would contribute "human investment", or forced labor on the fields.

Maga decided to reshuffle the cabinet in February 1962. He added the planning and development duties to Apithy's office to quench his apparently unquenchable thirst for power. Nonetheless, he accused Maga of being a dictator, and the series of demonstrations the vice president coordinated would ultimately depose his boss. They were not sparked by Maga himself, but rather the murder of David Dessou.

== Dessou riots ==
January 1962 saw the poisoning of Dessou, an official of the Sakete sub-prefecture. The deputy from his constituency, named Christophe Bokhiri, was accused of the crime and duly arrested. He was released after his fellow deputies in the National Assembly requested to suspend proceedings against him under the parliamentary immunity clauses of the Dahomey Constitution, specifically Article 37. Maga, meanwhile, was away in Paris during all of this.

The people of Dahomey, on the other hand, were outraged on the release of Bokhiri. They incited racial clashes in the summer of 1963, as the murderer and the victim were of different tribes. Demonstrations were organized in Porto-Novo on October 21 and soon spread to Cotonou. They remained somewhat orderly before the trade unionists were involved. While still led by Maga, the trade unionists were still upset by the wage cut and used the case to further their interests. In addition, they criticized what they called Maga's "squander-mania", such as the construction of a presidential palace. Most of the demonstrations were peaceful, although several demonstrators destroyed a sign containing Maga's name on a hospital. Six trade unionists were arrested on the second day of demonstrations, causing the unions to call a general strike. By the end of the second day, protesters forced the National Assembly to put Bokhiri back in jail, which simultaneously enforced a curfew.

In light of recent events, Maga cancelled his trip to the United States and returned to Dahomey immediately. Appealing for peace, he convened a special National Assembly session. The protesters and trade unionists were indifferent to these actions; when Maga agreed with their demands and replaced his government with a provisional one in which Apithy and Ahomadégbé-Tomêtin had equal standing, they organized themselves to "boo" this new order. Armed northerners came down to Cotonou to support Maga and clashed with dissenters, killing two. The protesters, however, would not return to their jobs until Maga no longer held his.

== Coup ==
On October 28 Chief of Staff of the 800-man Dahomeyan Army Christophe Soglo took control of the country to prevent a civil war. He dismissed the cabinet, dissolved the Assembly, suspended the constitution and banned all demonstrations. After having Maga sign his resignation the same day he gave Maga, Apithy, and Ahomadégbé-Tomêtin the powers of the Ministry of State. Southern Dahomey later created a statue in honor of this day in the national history.

The strikes ended the next day. The reasons for the overthrow of Maga was the "luxurious life style of the rulers, abusive increase in the number of ministerial posts, unsatisfied social demands, unkept promises, the rise of the cost of living, and antidemocratic measures that martyrized the people and reduced them to nothing."

== Aftermath ==
The provisional government dissolved the PDU and replaced it by a Dahomeyan Democratic Party (PDD). It announced a referendum on the status of the constitution was to be held on December 15, although it was not held until 5 January 1964. At the same time, a committee was established to investigate perceived wrongdoings by the Maga administration. In late November, it began prosecuting members of the cabinet, such as the Minister of National Economy and the Finance Minister for misusing public funds. Maga was soon to find himself in jail too.

Soglo and Maga were friends. However, in early December, Soglo discovered a plot to have him assassinated and blamed Maga, who resigned his post on December 4. A few days after the discovery, he was placed under house arrest along with four former cabinet members. At an official inquiry this conspiracy charge was dropped, but Maga was still guilty of corruption. Following a March 1964 retrial, Maga was let out of prison and went into exile in Paris.

== See also ==
- Republic of Dahomey

== Bibliography ==
- Carter (1963), "Dahomey", in Margaret, Gwendolen (ed.), Five African States; Responses to Diversity: the Congo, Dahomey, the Cameroun Federal Republic, the Rhodesias and Nyasaland, South Africa, Ithaca, New York: Cornell University Press, OCLC 413212.
- Decalo, Samuel (April 1973), "Regionalism, Politics, and the Military in Dahomey", The Journal of Developing Areas, 7 (3), College of Business, Tennessee State University: 449–478, JSTOR 4190033.
- Dossou-Yovo, Noel (September 1999), "The Experience of Benin", International Journal on World Peace, 16 (3), ISSN 0742-3640, OCLC 211426384, archived from the original on 2010-09-16 – via Questia.
- Keesing's Worldwide, LLC. (November 1963), "Nov 1963 - Fall of President Maga's Regime. - Formation of Provisional Military Government", Keesing's Contemporary Archives, 9, London, ISSN 0022-9679, OCLC 1644683.
- Magnusson, Bruce A. (January 2001), "Democratization and Domestic Insecurity: Navigating the Transition in Benin", Comparative Politics, 33 (2): 211–230, doi:10.2307/422379, JSTOR 422379.
- Matthews, Ronald (1966), African Powder Keg: Revolt and Dissent in Six Emergent Nations, London: The Bodley Head, OCLC 246401461.
- Ronen, Dov (1975), Dahomey: Between Tradition and Modernity, Ithaca, New York: Cornell University Press, ISBN 0-8014-0927-6, OCLC 1527290.
