= Rogatien Biaou =

Beninese politician and diplomat

Rogatien Biaou (born 19 May 1952, in Savé) is a Beninese politician and diplomat. Biaou was the Foreign Minister of Benin from June 12, 2003 to February 16, 2006.

Rogatien Biaou has held several positions outside of public office, including in the United Nations Diplomatic Corps. Mr. Biaou served as Chairman for the Group of Ministers of Foreign Affairs of the Nordic and African States, Honorary President for the UN Security Council (2005), Non-Permanent Member of the UN Security Council (2004-2005), Chairman of the Ministerial Group of Emerging Markets of the United Nations (2003-2006), Knight of the National Order, Republic of Benin.

== Current ==
Rogatien Biaou continues to advocate the principles of environmental, social, and corporate governance for economic and social justice around the world. As a founding member of Alliance Patriotique Nouvel Espoir Mr. Biaou continues advocating for the release of political prisoners and for free, fair and democratic elections in Benin.

Political offices
Preceded by Joseph Gnonlonfoun	Foreign Minister of Benin; 2003–2006	Succeeded by Frédéric Dohou
