= International University of Grand-Bassam =

University in Grand-Bassam, Côte d'Ivoire

- IUGB official logo
- Motto in English: Excellence. Accountability. Opportunity
- Type: Private
- Established: May 16, 2007
- Founders: Georgia State University (GSU) and Republic of Côte d'Ivoire
- Chairman: Kouassi Kouame
- President: Saliou Toure
- Vice-president: Samuel Koffi (Chief Operating Officer), Ahmed Legrouri (Academic Affairs)
- Provost: Ahmed Legrouri
- Dean: Marcel Silué (STEM), Koffi N’Da (BSS)
- Director: Julie Reimer (UPP)
- Academic staff: 82
- Undergraduates: 813
- Location: Grand-Bassam, Republic of Côte d'Ivoire; 5°12′N 3°44′W
- Language: English
- Colors: (Dark Blue, White, Yellow)
- Website: iugb.org

The International University of Grand-Bassam (IUGB) is an independent and nonprofit institution of higher education located in Grand-Bassam, Côte d'Ivoire. In cooperation with Georgia State University (GSU) in Atlanta, Georgia, and the government of Côte d'Ivoire, IUGB opened in January 2005 and was formally established as an accredited institution of higher education in May 2007. Its main objective is to provide an American-style curriculum to students from Sub-Saharan Africa. It is the first university in French-speaking Côte d'Ivoire that uses English as the primary language of instruction.

== History ==
=== Early years ===
In 1994, an initiative called Project Link was created in Côte d'Ivoire by a team of GSU academics, administrators, and student representatives. Project Link aimed to provide an international platform for educational exchange and cultural awareness to GSU students, faculty, and staff. To support this initiative, Côte d'Ivoire's Ministry of Higher Education and GSU signed a formal agreement. Later, Steve Langston, GSU's Vice President for Public Service, formed a local coordinating committee at GSU. In 1995, GSU provided tuition waivers for Project Link Scholars, an association of Ivorian students interested in exchange study at GSU through Project Link.

In 1997, GSU President Carl Patton visited Côte d'Ivoire to renew and expand the Project Link agreement. Under the leadership of Langston, GSU created the Office of West African Programs. Langston assigned Samuel Koffi, the Assistant Director of the Office, to create an international university in Côte d'Ivoire.

In 1998, the government of Côte d'Ivoire and GSU signed a memorandum of understanding to cooperate on the establishment of an international university modeled on the American style of higher education. As a result, GSU worked on a planning grant for an institution named "International University for Development in West Africa".

=== 2000–2006 ===
In 2000, the Agency for Education and Development (AED), an American non-governmental organization, was founded to collect government funds and support the creation and development of the new university. Despite changes in Côte d'Ivoire's political landscape in late 2000, GSU collaborated with Côte d'Ivoire through AED. In 2002, AED commissioned GSU's Center for Business and Industrial Marketing (CBIM) to conduct a marketing study in Côte d'Ivoire.

From 2004 to 2005, the Côte d'Ivoire and GSU partnership reached two important milestones. First, with administrative support from GSU, AED created a pre-university program with a two-year core curriculum. Second, thirteen students enrolled in IUGB as it opened in January 2005. According to records, students who completed their freshman and sophomore years at IUGB were transferred to GSU to complete their bachelor's degrees.

In the 2006–07 academic year, enrollment at IUGB reached 76. Within three years, it increased to 145. The Office of West African Programs was ended; the Project Link Scholars program was since administered by the director of the Office of African American Student Services and Programs.

=== Public accreditation and expansion ===
On 16 May 2007, IUGB was formally established as a university in Côte d'Ivoire by Decree 2007-477. On 18 May 2007, Saliou Toure, a university professor and former Minister of Higher Education of Côte d'Ivoire, was appointed as IUGB's first president. On 26 July 2007, GSU and IUGB mutually agreed to renew their formal relationship in a memorandum of cooperation.

In 2008, IUGB's student enrollment reached 125, and the first two cohorts of IUGB graduates arrived at GSU in Atlanta. Two teams of experts from GSU and Côte d'Ivoire worked on the third and fourth year of the IUGB curriculum, leading to the development of a five-year business plan.

Despite political and social instability after the 2010 presidential election, IUGB remained open. By the end of the post-electoral crisis, 17 new IUGB transfer students enrolled at GSU. Around December 2010, IUGB's student enrollment reached 250.

On 27 July 2015, IUGB awarded its first bachelor's degrees to 23 students.

On 6 March 2017, American politician Andrew Young visited IUGB to join Vice President Daniel Kablan Duncan for a ground-breaking ceremony on the site of the new 51-hectare (130-acre; 0.51 km^{2}) IUGB campus. The project was scheduled to cover four zones: education, student life, administration, and sports. In 2018, 48 students graduated while 813 students from 24 countries enrolled full-time at IUGB.

== Governance ==
=== Board of directors ===
IUGB academic policies and strategic planning are enacted by a board of directors comprising twenty members; four represent Côte d'Ivoire, two represent the AED, one represents GSU, four represent the Partners Council, four represent the private sector, and four represent other private personalities selected by IUGB's president. The board also initiates fundraising for university projects. The president manages university operations according to the plan set by the board. A senior executive team, including the president, the Chief Operations Officer, the Vice-President for Academic Affairs, and the Deans of the schools, is responsible for implementing university policies and programs as recommended by the board.

=== Strategic plan ===
The IUGB 2016–2020 strategic plan aims to reinforce the university's vision and principles in building an American-style education for graduates of international stature. The plan lists three main initiatives for reaching these goals: a framework for financial stability, resources for building and equipping a new campus, and international recognition of IUGB through U.S. educational accreditation.

== Academic organization ==
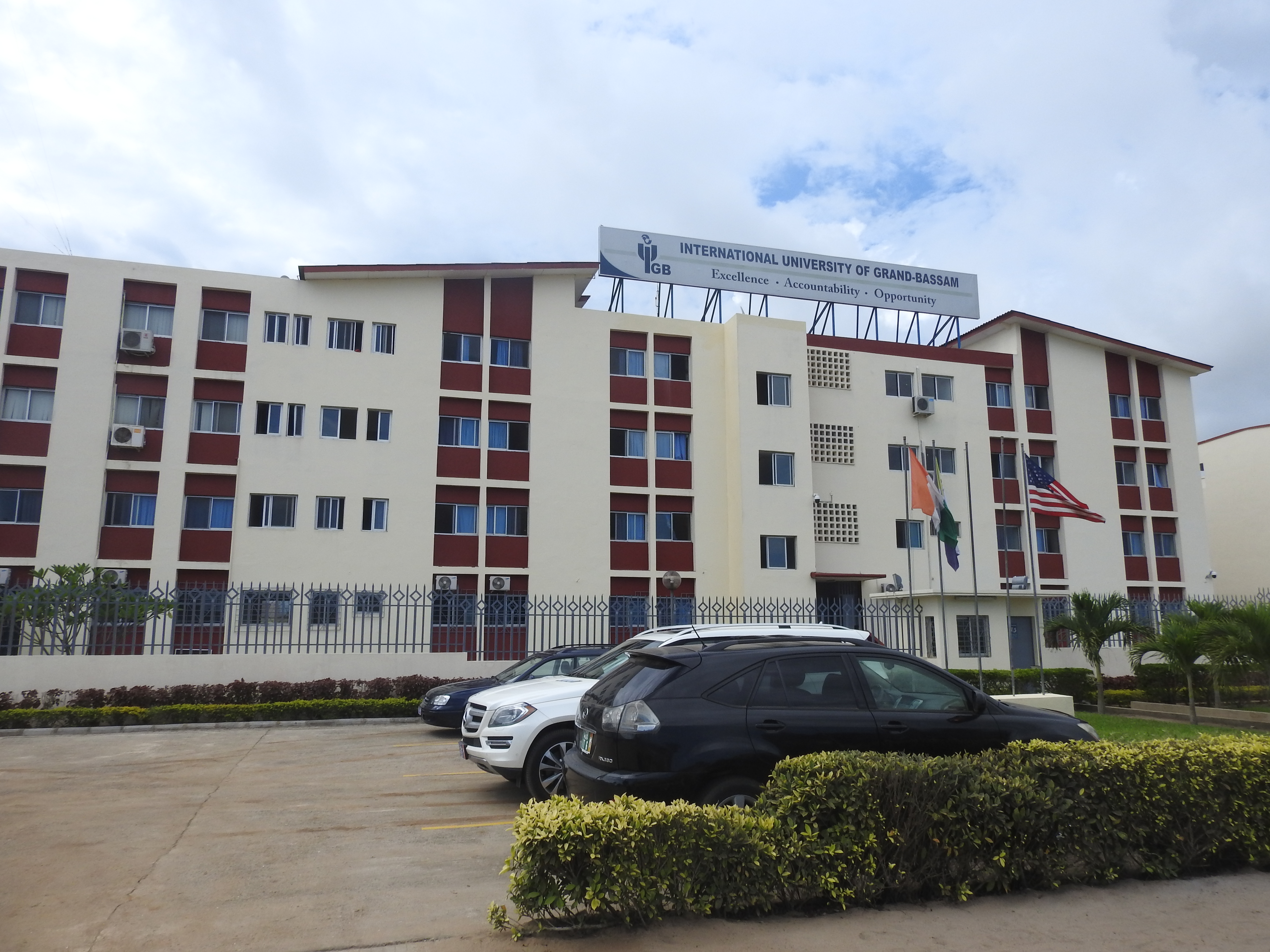
IUGB main campus

IUGB aims to provide regionally relevant education, build international partnerships, and create local outreach programs and services. The university is organized into three schools including the School of Science, Technology, Engineering, and Mathematics (STEM); the School of Business and Social Science (BSS); and the Undergraduate Preparatory Program (UPP). While the main administration and campus are in Grand-Bassam, the university maintains offices and a Center for Continuing Education in Abidjan. In 2018, 82 faculty members (37 full-time and 45 part-time) were teaching undergraduate programs across the three schools.

=== Undergraduate Preparatory Program ===
The Undergraduate Preparatory Program (UPP) helps students who are interested in joining the main IUGB degree programs. UPP prepares students for university-level work through intensive courses in English, technology, and mathematics. UPP students are officially registered as IUGB students with access to all academic, welfare, social, and cultural resources.

=== School of Business and Social Science ===
The School of Business and Social Science (BSS) provides a liberal arts curriculum in addition to institutional majors and minors. Since May 2014, the school offered a Bachelor of Business Administration (BBA) with concentrations in Accounting, Economics, Finance, Management, and Marketing; a Bachelor of Arts (BA) in Political Science; and a Bachelor of Science in Computer Information Systems (BS CIS). The School also offers minors in several business-related fields of interest, as well as a minor in International Relations.

=== School of Science, Technology, Engineering and Mathematics ===
The School of Science, Technology, Engineering, and Mathematics (STEM) offers a Bachelor of Science in Computer Science (BS CSC), a Bachelor of Science in Mathematics (BS MATH), and a Bachelor of Science in Mechanical Engineering Technology (BS MET). STEM has also minors in Mathematics and Computer Science and concentrations in Database and Knowledge-Based Systems, Network and Mobile Communications, Information Technology, and Mobile Application Development.

=== Center for Continuing Education ===
The Center for Continuing Education (CCE) provides training in non-academic programs and professional fields including leadership development, faculty development and teacher training, language acquisition, and testing preparation and examination.

== IUGB Foundation ==
The IUGB Foundation, Inc. is a nonprofit organization founded in Atlanta, Georgia on 20 February 2012. The foundation is organized for charitable and educational purposes and aims to promote leadership development by providing scholarships, fellowships, grants, and loans for academic intents to IUGB students, faculty, and the administration. Since early 2018, the foundation's executive director is Amini Kajunju, who previously served as the president and CEO of the Africa-America Institute (AAI), one of the oldest nonprofit organizations in the U.S.

== Student life ==
In 2018, the IUGB student population reached 813, including international students. A significant number of students live in three residential halls in the vicinity of the main campus. Student organizations, programs, activities, and other leadership opportunities are part of the co-curricular learning experience in both schools. The Student Government Association (SGA) protects students' rights and upholds their interests in academic, institutional, and campus affairs. The SGA also engages students in internal activities and community outreach programs to enrich their learning experience.

Outside of academic activities, students interact through student-run clubs and organizations. Religious, speech, political science, and business clubs are supported by the IUGB Student Life and Services Department. Cultural programs help students participate in local and international cultural excursions, administration-sponsored study trips, and other learning activities.

== Affiliations ==
IUGB is a member of the Worldwide Universities Network (WUN) and the Association of African Universities. IUGB's notable international partners include GSU, the University of Houston, the University of South Africa, and the Global Liberal Arts Alliance. IUGB has partnerships in South Africa, Burkina Faso, Mali, Morocco, Chile, France, India, Jamaica, and Slovakia.

== See also ==
- List of universities in Ivory Coast
- Association of African Universities
