= Saturnin Soglo =

Beninese politician (died 2024)

Saturnin Soglo (died 2 July 2024) was a Beninese politician. He was the foreign minister of Benin from 1992 to 1993, serving under his brother president Nicéphore Soglo. Soglo died on 2 July 2024.

Political offices
Preceded by Théodore Holo	Foreign Minister of Benin; 1992–1993	Succeeded by Robert Dossou
