= Moussa Okanla =

Beninese scholar and diplomat (1950–2022)

Moussa Okanla (2 September 1950 – 2 March 2022) was a Beninese scholar and diplomat. Okanla was appointed Minister of Foreign Affairs in the government named on 17 June 2007, and was replaced by Jean-Marie Ehouzou on 22 October 2008.

== Education ==
He attended primary and secondary schools in his hometown, Porto-Novo, French Dahomey, French West Africa, France, from 1957 through 1971. Then he enrolled in the University of Dahomey (currently University of Abomey-Calavi) where he was awarded the bachelor's degree in History. In 1974 he entered the Master's program at the International Relations Institute of Cameroon Yaounde, he completed the master's degree in 1976. After spending one academic year in Gabon as a lecturer at the Ecole Normale Supérieure du Gabon, Libreville, he entered the doctoral program at the University of Michigan, Ann Arbor. Okanla held a PhD in political science, specializing in international relations, from the University of Michigan, Ann Arbor.

== Career ==
Okania was latterly a lecturer in Political Science in the University of Abomey-Calavi and a lecturer in International Relations at Houdegbe North American University (Benin). From 1987 to 1994, he was the Benin Representative of the African and Afroamerican Institute (AAI) based in New York.

From 1991 to 1994, he was the Technical Advisor for International Cooperation in the Ministry of Foreign Affairs, Benin Republic. From 1994 to 1998, he was the Specialist in Democracy and Governance for USAID regional office based in Abidjan, Côte d'Ivoire. From 1999 to 2000, he was the Governance Advisor for UNDP bureau in Cotonou Benin.

From 2001 to 2003, he was the Deputy Director and Director of the Benin School of Public Administration and Magistrate. From 2004 to 2007, he was a Program Officer for PGDP, a program on governance funded by DANIDA and administered by NIRAS-Denmark. From March 2012, he was an Order of National Merit Commander.

== Personal life ==
Okanla died on 2 March 2022, at the age of 71.

== Selected publications ==
- Bibliography on Photovoltaics, Renewable Energy, and Their Social Impacts: Working copy (In collaboration with Allen F. Roberts; Ann Arbor: University of Michigan, Center for Afro-American and African Studies, 1982)
- The United States and Southern Africa: a test of theories of foreign policy (Ann Arbor: University Microfilms International, 1982)
- ”Les concepts de sécurité en Afrique”, in UNIDIR, Afrique, Désarmement et Sécurité (New York : Publications des Nations Unies, GV.EF.91.01,1991)
- « Benin :the struggle against corruption in theory and practice », in Center for Institutional Reform, and the Informal Sector, Governance and the Economy in Africa (College Park: University of Maryland, 1996)
- Démocratie et Gouvernance en Afrique : Etat des Lieux (in collaboration avec René Lemarchand, Abidjan : United States Information Service, September 1996)
- “Ethnicité et démocratisation en Afrique de l’Ouest: le rôle de l’Armée”, in Métafro Infosys, vol. 23, 1999, pp. 11–36

- "Après la Guerre Froide, quel role pour l'Afrique? (forthcoming)

Political offices
Preceded by Mariam Aladji Boni Diallo	Foreign Minister of Benin; 2007–2008	Succeeded by Jean-Marie Ehouzou
