= Frédéric Affo =

Beninese politician

Frédéric Assogba Affo (1943 – 3 May 2011) was a Beninese politician. He was the foreign minister of Benin from 1984 to 1987. Previously, he had served as prefect of the Atlantique Department, and after serving as foreign minister was the Ambassador of Benin to Cuba.

== Early life and career ==
Born in Ouedeme in 1943, Affo was schooled in an international education. He specifically studied at the Institute for the Study of Economic and Social Development in Sorbonne, France, with a thesis on the dynamic relationships between education and economic production in Dahomey for his diploma.

He was a participant in the coup of 1972 led by Major Mathieu Kérékou and became one of its most prominent voices as a member of the presidential council. Several years later, he joined the central committee of the Parti de la Revolution Populare du Benin. During the revolutionary period of Benin after the 1975 coup, he served as prefect of the Atlantique Department in the south of the country. He served as foreign minister. He was replaced as Foreign Minister by Guy Landry Hazoumé, who was previously the Ambassador of Benin to the United States. His removal was considered surprising, with theories suggesting that he was removed because relations with the United States were turning sour that a new person was needed with a different approach to foreign relations. After serving as foreign minister, he was the Ambassador of Benin to Cuba.

After presiding over his local football team, The Atlantic Sharks, Affo became the president of the entire Atlantique Football League. His dedication resulted in his becoming the head of the Benin Football Association. Affo died on 3 May 2011 in Cotonou.

== Notes ==
Political offices
Preceded by Tiamiou Adjibadé	Foreign Minister of Benin; 1984–1987	Succeeded by Guy Landry Hazoumé
