= Jean Lorougnon Guédé University =

Public university in Daloa, Ivory Coast

- Université Jean Lorougnon Guédé
- Type: Public
- Established: 1996
- Affiliations: AUF
- President: Gnakri Dago
- Administrative staff: 144
- Students: 2,000
- Location: Daloa, Côte d'Ivoire
- Campus: Rural
- Website: www.ujlog.ci

Jean Lorougnon Guédé University (in French Université Jean-Lorougnon-Guédé) is an Ivorian public university located in Daloa, in the west central region of Côte d'Ivoire. Jean Lorougnon Guédé is member of several organizations of higher education, in particular the French-speaking University Agency (AUF) and the Telecoms research and education network of Côte d'Ivoire.

== History ==
Originally the school was a detachment of the University of Abobo-Adjamé. It has been a full-function university since 1996.
