= Michel Alladaye =

Beninese politician (born 1940)

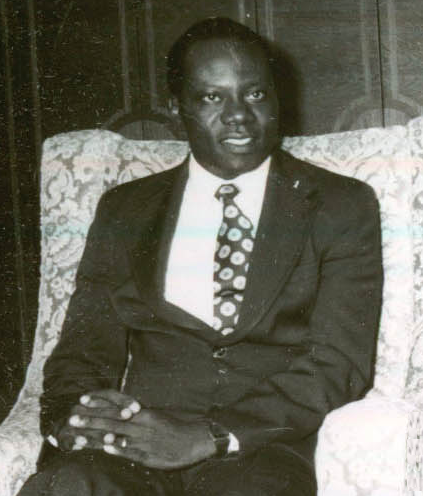
Michel Alladaye

Michel Alladaye (born 1940) is a former Beninese politician. He was the foreign minister of Benin from 1972 to 1980. Till April 1985 he was the Education minister.

Political offices
Preceded by Michel Ahouanmenou	Foreign Minister of Benin; 1972–1980	Succeeded by Simon Ifede Ogouma
