= Ordre du Mérite social =

The ordre du Mérite social was a civil honour in France. It was set up with three grades (knight, officer and commander) by a decree dated 24 October 1936 and administered by the Ministry of Employment. It rewarded those who had given devoted and selfless service to social work and mutual societies.

It replaced the Secours mutuels medals (which had themselves been set up by a decree dated 26 March 1852) and the "Médailles d’Honneur" (set up by a decree of 27 March 1858). Considered as 'associative medals', these could not be worn outside mutual benefit society circles. It also replaced the Médaille de la Prévoyance Sociale and Medaille des Assurances Sociales, set up in parallel by decrees in 1922 and 1923.

The Ordre was dissolved on the creation of the Ordre national du Mérite on 3 December 1963, though its existing holders continued to enjoy its associated prerogatives for life.

== Grades ==
Knight

Officer

Commander

== Decrees ==
- "14 February 1937 decree".
- "1963 decree".
