= Noel Dossou-Yovo =

Noel Dossou-Yovo (December 25, 1943 – May 5, 2011) was a Beninese academic. The holder of various degrees, he was head of African Studies at the National University of Benin in Cotonou. Dossou-Yovo held the positions of Deputy Director at the Center of African Family Studies in Nairobi from 1983 to 1996. From 1995 to 1996 he was Senior Advisor for African and Social Affairs of the Head of State in his home country. He was also a prolific writer, penning many articles in academic journals and those at conferences in Africa, Asia, Europe, and the United States. He died on May 5, 2011. He was 67 years old.

== Biography ==
Dossou-Yovo possessed two doctorates in the Humanities, a degree in political science, diplomacy, and development studies. He began teaching at the National University of Benin in Cotonou before 1974, where was head of African Studies. Dossou-Yovo held the positions of Deputy Director at the Center of African Family Studies in Nairobi from 1983 to 1986. In his home country, he was Senior Advisor for African and Social Affairs of the Head of State from 1995 to 1996.

The professor was also a prolific writer. He penned many articles in academic journals and those at conferences in Africa, Asia, Europe, and the United States. He authored a three-volume work on recent African novels written in the English language in 1997. In 2000, Dossou-Yovo's Development Problems in Contemporary Africa appeared on bookshelves across Europe.

== Bibliography ==
- Et Pourquoi l'Afrique refuserait-elle le développement ? L'Harmattan, 2010 (Noel Dossou-Yovo)
- Dossou-Yovo, Noel (1999). "The Experience of Benin". International Journal on World Peace. 16.
- Individu et Société dans le roman négro-africain d'expression anglaise de 1939 à 1986 (Tome 1)- L'Harmattan, 1998 (Noel Dossou-Yovo)
- Individu et Société dans le roman négro-africain d'expression anglaise de 1939 à 1986 (Tome 2)- L'Harmattan, 1998 (Noel Dossou-Yovo)
- Individu et Société dans le roman négro-africain d'expression anglaise de 1939 à 1986 (Tome 3)-L'Harmattan, 1998 (Noel Dossou-Yovo)
