= Louis Ignacio-Pinto =

Beninese politician (1903–1984)

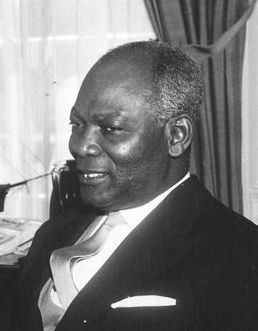
Louis Ignacio-Pinto, 1961

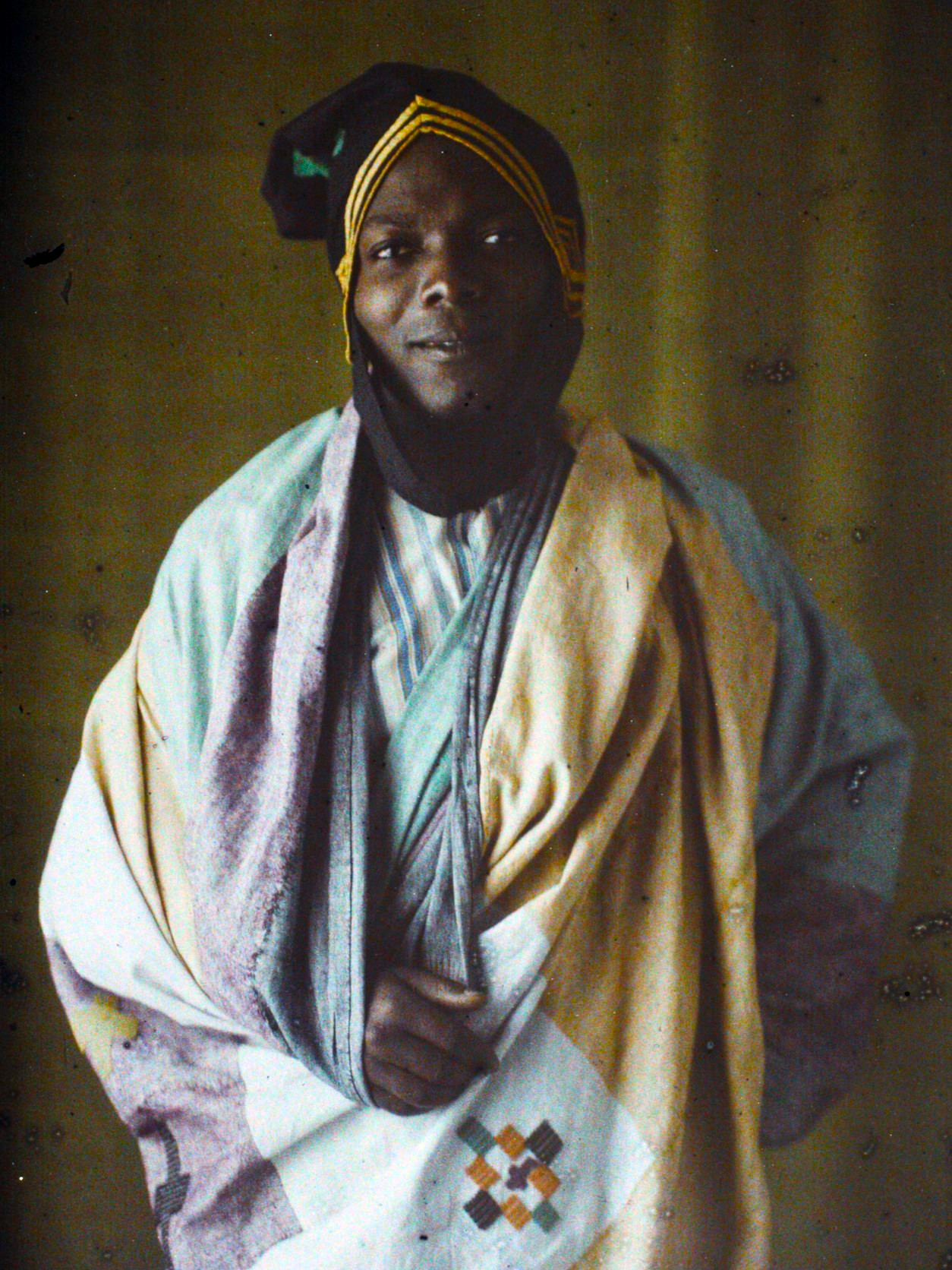
1931 Autochrome by Georges Chevalier

Louis Ignacio-Pinto (21 June 1903 in Porto-Novo, Benin – 24 May 1984 in Dourdan, France) was a politician from Benin who served in the French Senate from 1947 to 1955. From 1961 to 1967 he was the first permanent representative to United Nations and ambassador to the USA. From 1967 to 1970, he was chief justice of Supreme Court of Dahomey. From 1970 to 1979, he was judge at the International Court of Justice.
