= Gabriel Lozès =

Beninese medical doctor, politician and diplomat

Gabriel Lozès (18 August 1917 – 25 June 1986) was a Beninese medical doctor, politician, and diplomat.

Lozes served as Minister of Health in 1963 and 1964 and replaced Chabi Mama as Foreign Minister from 25 January 1964 to 1 December 1965. During this time, Lozes also served as General Secretary of the unique Parti Démocratique Dahoméen (PDD) and as Ahomadegbe's right-hand man. After the dissolution of the PDD, he created the Alliance Démocratique Dahoméenne (ADD) and became its first General Secretary. On 28 January 1966 he was briefly detained for interrogation on suspicion of publishing tracts inciting revolt against the new government of Christophe Soglo. He was again imprisoned in May 1969, being accused of plotting to return Ahomadegbe to power and to overthrow the regime of Emile Zinsou. In 1971 he served as Minister of Public Works, Transports and Mines. He was again arrested and briefly detained in 1973.

The Lozès family migrated to the French suburban city of Creil in 1979, then to Villepinte (Seine-Saint-Denis).

Gabriel Lozes is the father of Patrick Lozès (fr), former president of the Representative Council of France's Black Associations and candidate to the 2012 French presidential election.

Political offices
Preceded by Chabi Mama	Foreign Minister of Benin; 1964–1965	Succeeded by Tahirou Congacou
