= Simon Ifede Ogouma =

Beninese politician (died 2023)

Simon Ifede Ogouma (c. 1933 – 29 January 2023) was a Beninese politician. He was the foreign minister of Benin from 1980 to 1982.

Ogouma died on 29 January 2023, at the age of 89.

Political offices
Preceded by Michel Alladaye	Foreign Minister of Benin; 1980–1982	Succeeded by Tiamiou Adjibadé
