= Mariam Boni Diallo =

Beninese politician (born 1952)

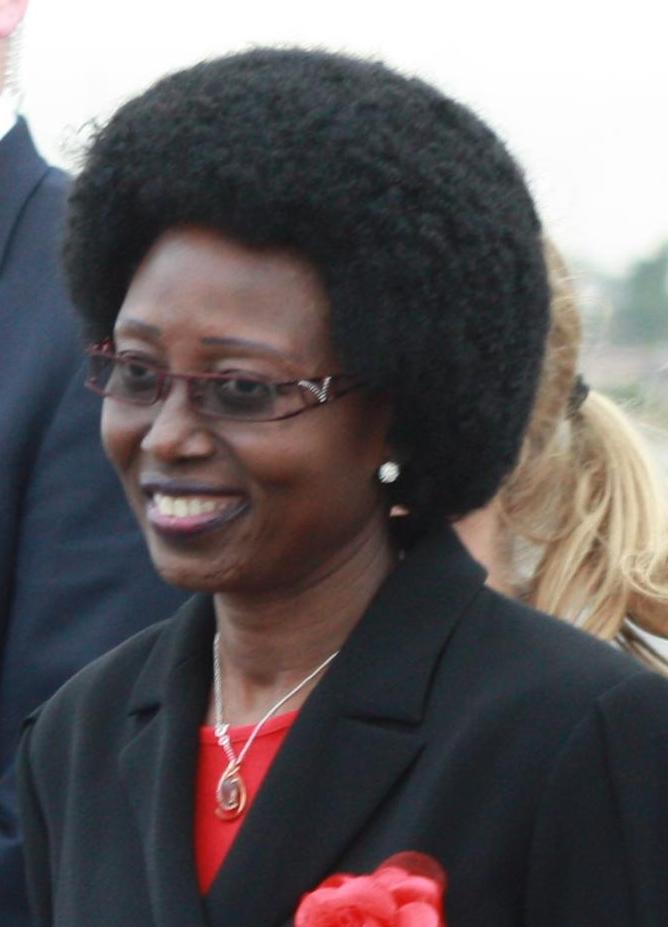
Mariam Aladji Boni Diallo in 2012

Mariam Aladji Boni Diallo (born 1952) is a Beninese politician. She was Benin's Minister of Foreign Affairs from 10 April 2006 to 17 June 2007.

She was born in Nikki in 1952 and received an international education. Prior to becoming Foreign Minister, Diallo had been Secretary-General of the Ministry of Foreign Affairs since March 2004. She was a counsellor to the Benin Embassy in Germany. She served as a diplomatic advisor to President Boni Yayi.

== Notes ==
Political offices
Preceded by Frédéric Dohou	Foreign Minister of Benin; 2006–2007	Succeeded by Moussa Okanla
