= Guy Landry Hazoumé =

Beninese politician and poet

Guy Landry Hazoumé (10 June 1940 – 22 August 2012) was a Beninese politician and poet. He was the foreign minister of Benin from 1987 to 1989. He was a graduate of the Institut d'Etudes Politiques was appointed director-general of political affairs in 1968. He also served as ambassador to the UN. He died on 22 August 2012.

== Notes ==
Political offices
Preceded by Frédéric Affo	Foreign Minister of Benin; 1987–1989	Succeeded by Daniel Tawéma
