= University of Science and Technology of Benin =

Private university in Cotonou, Benin

Coordinates: 6.3829°N 2.4562°E

- Université des Sciences et Technologies du Bénin (USTB)
- Type: Private university
- Established: 1996
- Affiliations: Réseau des Universités des Sciences et Technologies des pays d'Afrique au sud du Sahara (RUSTA); International Association of Universities
- Location: Cotonou and Porto-Novo, Benin
- Campus: 3

The University of Science and Technology of Benin (French: Université des Sciences et Technologies du Bénin (USTB)) is a private university in Benin, whose headquarters are located in the district of Kpondéhou in Cotonou, the economic capital of Benin.

== History ==
Founded in October 1996 by Professor Frédéric Dohou, the "Université des Sciences et Technologies du Bénin" is a university institution for scientific, cultural and professional character, enjoying corporate personality, pedagogical and scientific, administrative and financial autonomy. It contributes to the missions of higher education and scientific research through six faculties and five specialized higher schools.

The USTB is a member institution of the Network of Universities of Science and Technology of the Countries of Africa south of the Sahara (French: Réseau des Universités des Sciences et Technologies des pays d'Afrique au Sud du Sahara (RUSTA)).

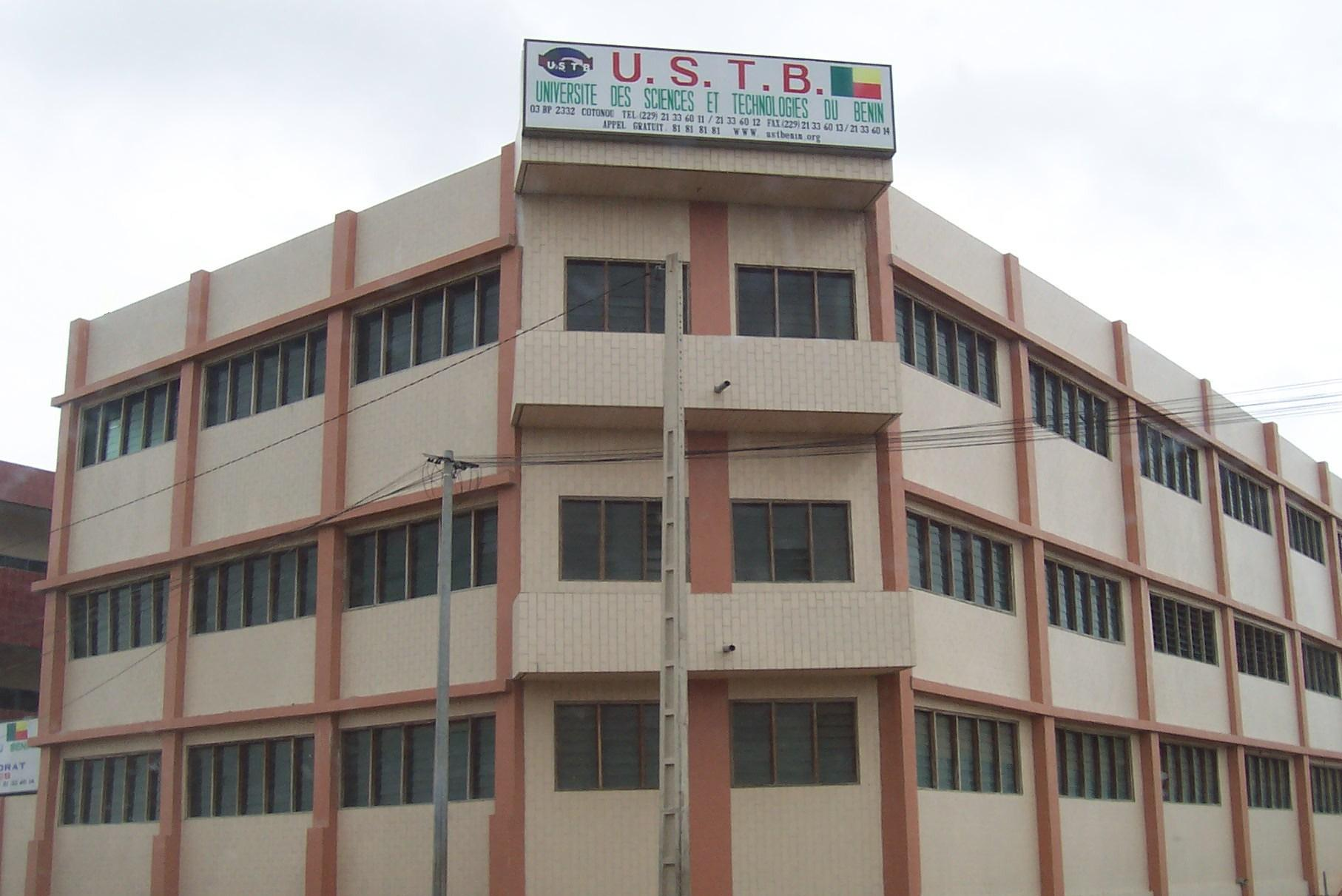
Headquarters of USTB in Cotonou.

== Organization ==
The USTB has six faculties, five specialized higher schools and one research centre:

=== List of Faculties ===
- Faculty of Legal, Administrative and Political
- Faculty of Economics
- Faculty of Management Sciences
- Faculty of Fundamental and Applied Sciences
- Faculty of Letters, Arts and Social Sciences
- Faculty of Agricultural Sciences
- Faculty of Computer Sciences

=== List of specialized Higher Schools ===
- Higher School of Management and Business Administration (ESMAE)
- Higher School of Communication (ESCOM)
- Higher School of Industrial Technology (ESTI)
- Higher School of Applied Informatics (ESIA)
- Higher School of Public Works, Mines and Geology (ESTPMG)

=== Research Centre ===
- Consortium for the management of basic and applied research in Africa south of the Sahara (French: Consortium pour le Management de la Recherche Fondamentale et Appliquée en Afrique au Sud du Sahara (COMREFAS))

== International relations ==
Since its inception, the USTB has worked to develop a network of international cooperation with foreign universities, including with the University of Poitiers.
