= Tahirou Congacou =

Beninese politician

President of Dahomey
- Acting; 29 November 1965 – 22 December 1965
- Preceded by: Justin Ahomadégbé-Tomêtin
- Succeeded by: Christophe Soglo

Personal details
- Born: 1911 Djougou, Dahomey
- Died: 15 June 1993 (aged 81–82) Cotonou, Benin
- Party: PDD

Tahirou Congacou (1911 – 15 June 1993) was a Beninese politician, most active during the 1960s, when his country was known as Dahomey. He served as President of the National Assembly from 1964 to 1965, and in that capacity served as acting President of Benin from 29 November 1965 to 22 December 1965. He also served as acting foreign minister during 1965.

== Early political career ==
Congacou was born to a Dendi family in 1913 and was a descendant of the Djougou royal house. His ancestors were oral tradition keepers in the kingdom of Djougou. In colonial Dahomey, Congacou served as a subprefect in Nikki. In the aftermath of World War II he was a deputy to the General Council of Dahomey. He also served in the Dahomey territorial assembly from 1952 to 1957. When Hubert Maga was deposed in 1963, Congacou was elected head of the National Assembly, as well as assistant secretary general of the Parti Democratique Dahomeen (PDD), the new national party. He served as President of the National Assembly of Dahomey from January 1964 to November 1965.

== President of Dahomey ==
On 29 November 1965, General Christophe Soglo forcibly removed Justin Ahomadégbé-Tomêtin's mandate. He temporarily handed power to Congacou, under the provisions of Articles 17 and 35 of the Dahomeyan constitution. Congacou was charged to form a national coalition to end the regionalism that dominated Dahomeyan politics at the time.

Congacou's government was composed of himself and four technocrats. It disbanded the PDD on December 4 and set free political prisoners. In accordance with Article 7 of the constitution, the regime was forced to hold elections by 18 January 1966.

When the new president failed to do so, Soglo removed Congacou from power on 22 December 1965.

== Later life ==
During the presidency of Emile Derlin Zinsou, Congacou was president of the Social and Economic Council, established in October 1968. Congacou died on 15 June 1993.

== Bibliography ==
- Decalo, Samuel (April 1973), "Regionalism, Politics, and the Military in Dahomey", The Journal of Developing Areas, 7 (3), College of Business, Tennessee State University: 449–478, JSTOR 4190033.
- Decalo, Samuel (1976), Historical Dictionary of Dahomey (People's Republic of Benin), Metuchen, NJ: Scarecrow Press, ISBN 978-0-8108-0833-1, OCLC 82503.
- Ronen, Dov (1975), Dahomey: Between Tradition and Modernity, Ithaca, NY: Cornell University Press, ISBN 978-0-8014-0927-1, OCLC 1527290.

Political offices
Preceded by Gabriel Lozès	Foreign Minister of Benin; 1965	Succeeded by Émile Zinsou
