= Université Alassane Ouattara =

Public university in Côte d'Ivoire

Coordinates: 7.6864°N 5.0667°W

The Université Alassane Ouattara is a public university in Côte d'Ivoire. It was known as Université de Bouaké prior to a name change in August 2012. It was founded in 1992. It was temporarily relocated to Abidjan in 2002, but reopened in Bouaké in 2011.

== Faculties ==
Its faculties include:

- Communication, Environment and Society
- Administrative, Managerial and Legal Sciences
- Economic and Developmental Sciences
- Medical Sciences
- Medical and Veterinary Centre
- Research and Development Centre
- Multipolar Institute
- Regional Higher Education of Korhogo

The university is one of twelve worldwide to host a UNESCO chair in bioethics.
