= Tiamiou Adjibadé =

Beninese politician

Tiamiou Adjibadé (15 July 1937 – 12 September 2006) was a Beninese politician. He was the foreign minister of Benin from 1982 to 1984.

Political offices
Preceded by Simon Ifede Ogouma	Foreign Minister of Benin; 1982–1984	Succeeded by Frédéric Affo
