= Higher Institute of Technology of Ivory Coast =

Private institution in Abidjan, Ivory Coast

Coordinates: 5.3264°N 4.0219°W

- Institut Supérieur de Technologie de Côte d'Ivoire (IST-CI)
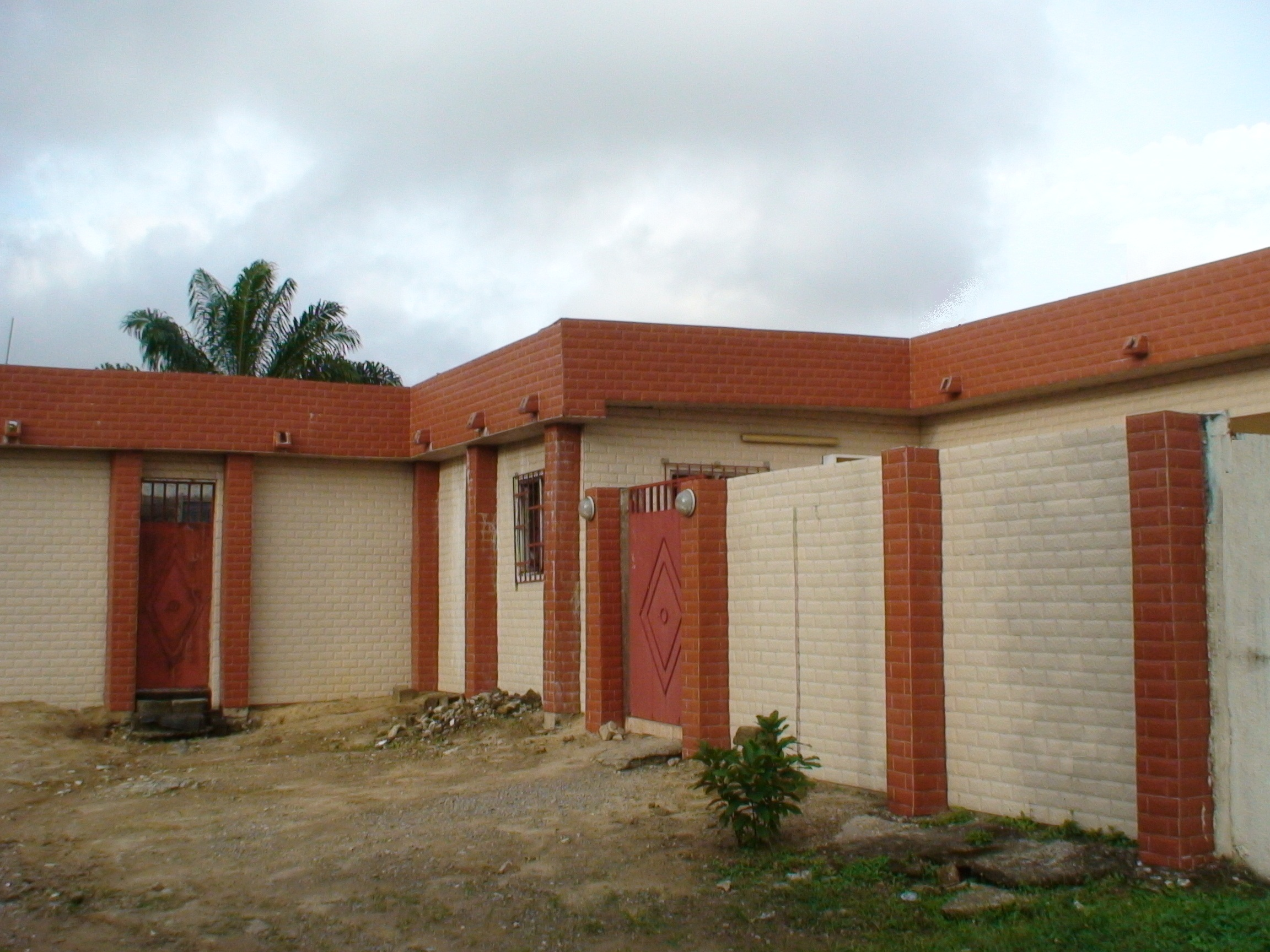
- Motto: La passion pour l'excellence
- Motto in English: The passion for excellence
- Type: Private academic institution
- Established: 2007
- Affiliations: Réseau des Universités des Sciences et Technologies des pays d'Afrique au sud du Sahara (RUSTA)
- President: Kouakou N'Guessan François
- Location: Abidjan, Côte d'Ivoire
- Campus: 3
- Website: www.rusta-istci.org

The Higher Institute of Technology of Ivory Coast (French: Institut Supérieur de Technologie de Côte d'Ivoire (IST-CI)) is a private institution of higher education and research whose headquarters is in the district of Plateau in Abidjan, the economic capital of Ivory Coast.

== History ==
Created by a group of teachers-researchers, the Institut Supérieur de Technologie de Côte d'Ivoire is a university institution for scientific, cultural and professional character, enjoying corporate personality, pedagogical and scientific, administrative and financial autonomy.

It contributes to the missions of higher education and scientific research through five specialized higher schools.

The IST-CI is a member institution of the Network of Universities of Science and Technology of the Countries of Africa south of the Sahara (French: Réseau des Universités des Sciences et Technologies des pays d'Afrique au Sud du Sahara (RUSTA)).

== Organization ==
The IST-CI has five specialized higher schools and one research centre:

=== Specialized higher schools ===
- Higher School of Management and Business Administration (ESMAE)
- Higher School of Communication (ESCOM)
- Higher School of Public Works, Mines and Geology (ESTPMG)
- Higher School of Industrial Technology (ESTI)
- Higher School of Applied Informatics (ESIA)

=== Research centre ===
- Consortium for the Management of Basic and Applied Research in Africa south of the Sahara (French: Consortium pour le Management de la Recherche Fondamentale et Appliquée en Afrique au sud du Sahara (COMREFAS))

== International relations ==
Since its inception, the IST-CI has worked to develop a network of international cooperation with foreign universities, including with the University of Poitiers.
