= Frédéric Dohou =

Beninese politician

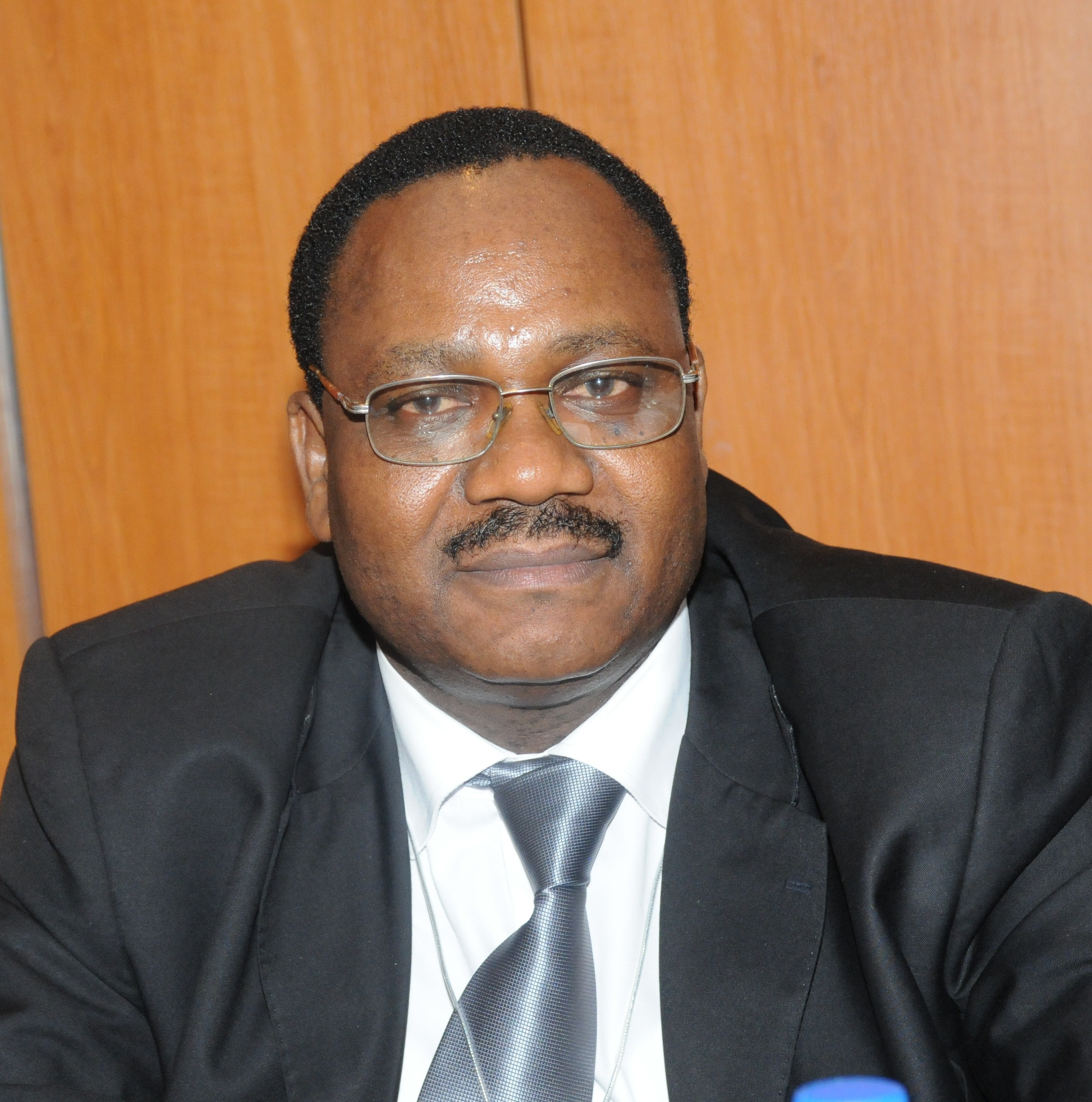

Minister of Foreign Affairs and African Integration (Benin)
- In office 15 February 2006 – 8 April 2006
- Preceded by: Rogatien Biaou
- Succeeded by: Mariam Aladji Boni Diallo

Minister of Communication and Promotion of New Technologies (Benin)
- In office 5 February 2005 – 8 April 2006

Minister of Culture, Handicrafts and Tourism (Benin)
- In office 12 June 2003 – 4 February 2005

Personal details
- Born: 1961 (age 64–65) Cotonou; Benin
- Profession: University President

Frédéric Dohou (born 1961) is a political figure from Benin.

He holds a PhD in Development Economics (1986) and he held several ministerial posts under the chairmanship of Mathieu Kérékou.

Founder of the University of Science and Technology of Benin, he is currently the chairman of the board of the Network of Universities of Science and Technology of the Countries of Africa south of the Sahara (RUSTA).

== Political career ==
Governmental functions :

- Special Advisor to the President Mathieu Kérékou (2001–2003)
- Minister of Culture, Handicrafts and Tourism (2003–2005)
- Minister of Communication and Promotion of New Technologies (2005–2006)
- Government Spokesman (2005–2006)
- Minister of Foreign Affairs and African Integration, ad interim (2006)
