= 1964 Dahomeyan constitutional referendum =

5 January 1964

Results
Choice	Votes	%
Yes	966,292	99.86%
No	1,318	0.14%
Valid votes	967,610	99.94%
Invalid or blank votes	619	0.06%
Total votes	968,229	100.00%
Registered voters/turnout	1,051,614	92.07%

A constitutional referendum was held in the Republic of Dahomey on 5 January 1964. The main issues were changing the system of government to a presidential system, scrapping term limits for the president, and having a unicameral parliament. The referendum passed with 99.86% of voters approving the changes. Turnout was 92% of the 1,051,614 registered voters.

== Results ==
Choice	Votes	%
For	966,292	99.86
Against	1,318	0.14
Total	967,610	100.00
Valid votes	967,610	99.94
Invalid/blank votes	619	0.06
Total votes	968,229	100.00
Registered voters/turnout	1,051,614	92.07
Source: Nohlen et al.
