= Théophile Nata =

Beninese politician

Théophile Nata (1947 – 11 June 2022) was a Beninese politician and a former member of the Pan-African Parliament.

== Education ==
Nata attended Natitingou Catholic Primary School for four years starting in 1954 and ended in 1960. He graduated from the Sainte Jeanne d' Arc de Oudah, Southern Benin after seven years.

He studied French and literature for two years at the Higher Education Centre of Lomé, Togo, as well as at Abidjan University in Côte d'Ivoire and the Sorbonne. He received a Master's Degree which dealt with colonisation and decolonisation in the novels of Aimé Césaire.

Nata acquired a PhD in Comparative Literature at the Sorbonne in 1976. He obtained a Bachelor's Degree, a Master of Arts and a Postgraduate diploma from the International Institute of Phonetics, Paris III University. He was appointed associate professor of French Language, Literature and Linguistics at the National University of Benin in 1976 as well.

== International and governmental work ==
Nata was the co-coordinator of the AGECOOP Project within the Directorate of National Commissions and Councils. He became director of the Asia Department at the Ministry of Foreign Affairs and Cooperation in 1978. In 1988, Nata was appointed Benin's Ambassador to Algeria and then as Beninese Ambassador to the United States.

He was a participant in the 1990 National Conference and was appointed Minister of Foreign Affairs and Cooperation of Benin's transitional government that same year. In 1991, he was made Commander of the National Order of Benin.

Nata served as Minister of Youth and Sports from 1991 to 1993. He founded a political party in 1992. He was elected to the National Assembly in the 1995 parliamentary election and was elected by the National Assembly as its Second Vice-president. In 1999, he was appointed Minister of Rural Development; he gained the rank of High Officer of the National Order of Benin in 2000. From 2001 to 2003, he served as Minister of Agriculture, Livestock and Fisheries. He was again elected as a deputy in the National Assembly in the March 2003 parliamentary election.

Nata served in the Pan-African Parliament beginning in 2004. Following the death of Jerome Sacca Kina Guezere in 2005, he became Fourth Vice-president of the Pan-African Parliament.

== See also ==
- List of members of the Pan-African Parliament
