= History of Benin =

Early evidence of human settlement in the area of modern Benin can be found in the Atakora mountain chain of north-western Benin. Systematic surveys and excavations have identified caves, rock shelters and open-air sites with lithic industries spanning the Early, Middle and Later Stone Age. Didier N'Dah's work at sites such as Kumaaku, Tanongou and the Pendjari area has reconstructed a chronocultural sequence from Early Stone Age to Late Stone Age, based on the typology of stone tools and comparisons with better-dated regions of West Africa. These sites have yielded a range of artefacts, including large flakes and cores associated with Middle Stone Age technologies, as well as microliths, grinding stones, polished axes and pottery that point to Later Stone Age and Neolithic occupations in the region. A wider survey of Pleistocene sites in West Africa includes localities in present-day Benin, confirming that the country forms part of the broader regional pattern of Stone Age settlement.

== Genetic studies ==
A 2015 study by Maarten Larmuseau et al. investigated the paternal genetic landscape of populations along the Bight of Benin, focusing on four groups from present-day Benin: the Fon, Yoruba, Bariba, and Dendi. Using Y-chromosomal markers, the research revealed significant genetic diversity among these populations, reflecting complex historical migrations and interactions.

The study found that the Beninese Yoruba exhibit notable genetic differentiation not only from neighboring groups but also from the Yoruba in Nigeria, suggesting distinct paternal lineages and historical developments. This diversity underscores the intricate demographic history of the region, shaped by various migration events and cultural exchanges.

== Precontact period ==
=== The Gbe cultural sphere ===
The Gbe-speaking peoples, ancestors of nearly eight million present-day speakers of the Aja-Ewe language continuum, occupy a central place in the cultural history of the Slave Coast of West Africa. Gbe belongs to the Kwa branch of the Niger-Congo language family and is subdivided into five primary clusters: Aja, Ewe, Fon, Gen, and Phla-Phera. These languages are spoken from eastern Ghana to southern Benin, with Phla-Phera speakers dispersed along the coasts of Togo, Benin, and western Nigeria. Oral traditions trace many Gbe-speaking polities back to dynastic dispersals from the town of Tado, believed to have been founded by migrants from Oyo or Ketu in the thirteenth century.

Dynastic claims to descent from Tado appear across kingdoms such as Notsé, Great Popo, Hueda, and Allada, and extend to Dahomey and Porto-Novo. These oral traditions suggest that regional rulers established new polities through conquest and alliance, rather than reflecting mass population movements. Linguistic evidence, including glottochronological studies, indicates that the differentiation of Gbe languages likely occurred well before the thirteenth century—possibly as early as 3,000 BC—undermining theories of recent, large-scale dispersal.

Rather than reflecting concrete genealogical links, dynastic narratives may have served as ideological tools to legitimize emerging elites by referencing prestigious origins. Thus, communities on the Slave Coast were better understood as part of a shared interaction sphere, characterized by common political myths and cultural practices. Akinjogbin identified at least fifteen small kingdoms on the eve of European contact that were ideologically linked by a kinship-based political order, the "Ebi social theory," which presented monarchs as father figures within federations of autonomous lineages.

=== Archaeological perspectives: Sodohomé and early settlement ===
Archaeological research on the Abomey Plateau has revealed a long and dynamic settlement history predating Dahomey. Investigations by the Projet Bénino-Danois d'Archéologie (BDArch), particularly at the Sodohomé channel, uncovered cultural remains from the mid-seventh century BC to AD 1200. Scatters of lithics at the southeastern end of the channel may indicate transient Middle Stone Age camps.

Later remains include ceramic sherds, iron slag, burials, refuse pits, and Dahomean-period subterranean structures. BDArch identified five archaeological phases and three cultural periods prior to Dahomey's rise, with settlement expansion and nucleation occurring from the Yellow Pottery Period (670–540 BC) through the Sodohomé Period (AD 870–1200). While some gaps in occupation are evident, the material suggests shifting settlements tied to agricultural, political, and economic pressures.

By AD 1000, clear evidence of small-scale iron smelting appears, expanding by AD 1400 to industrial-scale production. More than thirty sites have been documented across southern Benin, with induced-draft furnaces and extensive slag heaps indicating massive output—estimated at over four million kilograms of iron between AD 1400 and 1600. This surge likely responded to regional and possibly long-distance demand from Sahelian states.

=== Precontact economic foundations ===
The precontact economy of the Slave Coast was marked by market-oriented production. Oral and archaeological data suggest that many communities produced goods—including salt, iron, textiles, pottery, and fish—for sale and exchange. Markets at Savi, Apa, and Jakin attracted thousands, and smaller local markets served daily needs. The scale and organization of production, particularly of iron, suggests the emergence of a commodity economy before European arrival.

The archaeological and historical record underscores that by the sixteenth century, the region's polities were deeply integrated into interregional exchange networks and already exhibited significant political centralization. With the onset of Atlantic trade and the introduction of new crops and goods, these foundations enabled rapid demographic growth and increased state formation.

== Mythic era - 16th and 17th centuries ==
The origins of most Gbe polities are poorly understood, but historical sources indicate that throughout the sixteenth and seventeenth centuries, these polities vied for dominance over Atlantic commercial routes. This resulted in significant political and economic expansion. Colin Renfrew proposed the concept of "peer polity interaction" to describe how sociopolitical complexity can emerge not solely from internal developments but also through interaction between neighboring independent polities. This interaction encompassed emulation, competition, warfare, and trade. On the Slave Coast, this dynamic contributed to the rise of two dominant kingdoms: Allada and Hueda.

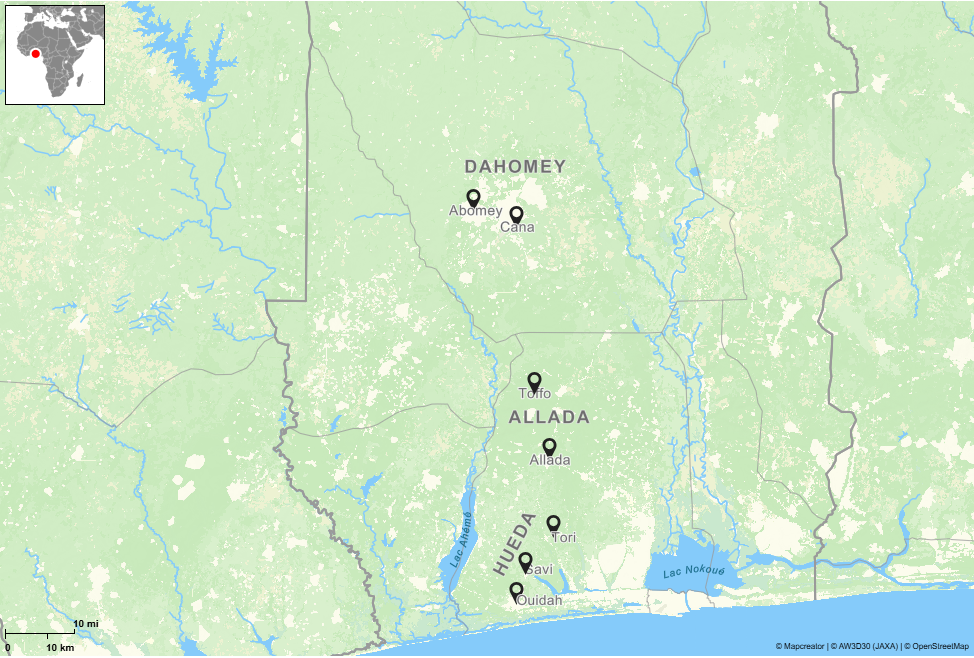
Seventeenth-century polities in southern Bénin, West Africa

=== The Kingdom of Allada ===
Founded in the sixteenth century, Kingdom of Allada rose as the dominant coastal polity in present-day southern Benin, leveraging early access to long-distance trade. Although little is known of its pre-European trade role, by the mid-sixteenth century Portuguese merchants were trading at its capital, Grand Ardra, now identified with the archaeological site of Togudo-Awute near modern Allada. From the 1560s, African captives labeled "Aradas" were recorded in Peru, and the city appeared on Portuguese charts after 1570.

By the seventeenth century, Allada had grown significantly. Grand Ardra was home to approximately 30,000 inhabitants, and the kingdom's military strength suggests a total population exceeding 200,000. The Dutch West India Company acquired around 800 slaves annually from Allada between 1636 and 1647, and by the 1680s, the Slave Coast exported roughly 5,000 captives per year, increasing to 10,000 by the 1710s. Textiles and cowries comprised up to 81% of goods exchanged for captives.

Allada's governance involved officials such as the Grand Captain (or Caminga), the Captain of the Whites (overseeing European trade), and the Captain of Horses. Royal authority was reinforced through rituals, although descriptions of religious institutions remain sparse and often dismissive. The king's crocodile deity, Tokpodun, may have functioned as a state cult. Grand Customs, involving ritual wealth distribution and limited human sacrifice, were held upon a king's death, paralleling later practices in Dahomey.

The influx of European and Asian goods strengthened royal prestige and authority. These goods were showcased and distributed during public rituals, bolstering elite status and political cohesion. The king monopolized high-quality imports and required that foreign traders first purchase goods from the crown before dealing elsewhere. Yet by the late seventeenth century, challenges mounted. Increased slave demand empowered secondary elites and rival ports like Whydah. Inland polities such as Dahomey began supplying captives directly. By 1670, only 17% of captives were sourced by the king himself. The remainder came from caboceers and inland traders.

Allada's failure to centralize control over trade led to political fragmentation. Succession disputes, including Hussar's attempted usurpation of King Soso (1717–24), and revolts in key towns like Offra, destabilized the kingdom. Consequently, European traders increasingly shifted their focus elsewhere by the century's end.

=== The Kingdom of Hueda (Whydah) ===
The kingdom of Hueda was an early beneficiary of Allada's inability to monopolize coastal trade. Oral traditions claim that, like Allada, Hueda was the product of a dynastic dispersal from Tado. A minor kingdom and a client of Allada for much of the seventeenth century, Hueda entered the documentary record in 1671 with the establishment of a French trading lodge in Savi, its royal capital. The English Royal African Company relocated its base to Savi in 1682, leaving the Dutch as the sole European power at Offra. Allada made attempts to reclaim control over trade, including reducing duties and imposing an embargo on Hueda-bound commerce, but these measures were largely unsuccessful.

Although Allada remained an important supplier of captives traded through Hueda, its exclusive control over trade revenues was significantly undermined. Hueda, meanwhile, grew rapidly. Its territory measured roughly 50 km east–west by 35 km north–south, and sources estimate its population exceeded 100,000, with a military potential of 20,000 to 40,000. Savi, the capital, was described as extremely populous, and its hinterland was densely settled with over two dozen provincial centers known as "Vice-roy's villages".

Savi functioned as both political capital and primary marketplace, drawing as many as 5,000 people on market days. Goods sold included locally produced salt, textiles, basketry, and pottery, as well as imported European merchandise. Rural and urban areas were integrated economically, forming a continuous, cultivated landscape.

Trade shifted decisively to Hueda in the late seventeenth century. European lodges were established in Savi, 15 km inland from the port town of Whydah, making it a central node in Atlantic commerce. One early eighteenth-century account highlighted Hueda's wealth and power, stating that it could hire enough help to destroy any adversary. As Hueda gained economic strength, it asserted political independence from Allada. From the 1670s to the 1710s, tensions escalated in the form of trade disputes, military clashes, and proxy wars.

Hueda's monarchy resembled Allada's, with a hereditary king who wielded judicial authority and controlled taxation and labor. The royal ancestor cult played a legitimizing role but remained minor in scale. The dominant religious institution was the cult of Dangbe, the python deity, led by an independent priesthood.

By the early eighteenth century, factionalism and the ambitions of autonomous officials eroded royal power. European merchants often supported competing elites, exacerbating internal divisions. King Haffon (r. 1708–33) tried to centralize control by restricting access to trade wealth, provoking opposition. Dissatisfied elites warned of violent consequences should the king continue his "tyranny". These internal divisions ultimately enabled Dahomey to conquer Hueda in 1727.

=== The emergence of the kingdom of Dahomey ===
Farther north on the Abomey Plateau, a third polity began to take shape during the seventeenth century: the Fon kingdom of Dahomey. Its origins remain obscure. Oral traditions recount that the ruling dynasty originated from a succession dispute between two princes of Allada, Teagbanlin and Dogbari. Teagbanlin allegedly founded Porto-Novo, while Dogbari's son Dakodonu migrated north and secured land at Abomey through interactions with the Guedevi chiefdoms.

The famous founding legend recounts how Dakodonu killed Chief Dan, building his palace over Dan's body—hence the name Dahomey, meaning "in the belly of Dan". However, modern scholarship casts doubt on this narrative, suggesting it was an eighteenth-century invention aimed at legitimizing the Fon dynasty's authority. Dahomey may have originated as a militarized band, and the link to Allada was likely retroactively constructed.

It is also possible that the dynasty emerged during the collapse of the iron economy on the plateau around 1600, creating opportunities for new elites to redirect trade toward the coast. Despite the contested nature of its origins, the Fon monarchy developed ritual and political structures similar to neighboring polities. Kings established legitimacy through vodùn worship and ancestor veneration, relocating local deities to palace precincts to reinforce royal authority.

The "Grand Customs," involving public displays of wealth and sacrifice, served as major political tools. Unlike Allada, Dahomean rulers performed these rites publicly, distributing goods and fostering loyalty among chiefs and subjects. King Wegbaja (ca. 1650–80) used feasting and redistribution to build alliances with local elites.

By the late seventeenth century, Dahomey expanded rapidly. Oral sources describe the kingdom's control extending across the entire Abomey Plateau by the early eighteenth century. Like Allada and Hueda, Dahomey relied on local elites to administer rural areas but demanded regular tribute flows to the capital.

Economic competition played a key role in this expansion. Control of trade routes—both within the plateau and toward the coast—was a major motivation for military campaigns. Conquests were justified by conflicts over trade access and slave raiding. Kings such as Akaba (ca. 1680–1716) intervened against rivals who restricted commerce or conducted raids against Dahomean dependents.

This early phase of Dahomean expansion, driven by trade competition and reinforced through ritualized redistribution, laid the foundations for the kingdom's emergence as a dominant regional power in the eighteenth century.

Dahomey's access to coastal commerce was strengthened by its control over intra-plateau trade, providing captives to coastal elites at Allada and Whydah. While some captives came from expansionist wars, others were likely acquired from or taxed on northern traders. By the 1690s, European observers noted that inland states like Dahomey were supplying increasing numbers of captives for sale at the coast.

Administration under early Dahomean rulers such as Wegbaja and Akaba was unevenly centralized. Wegbaja is credited with establishing a centralized legal code, and Akaba reportedly delegated authority in conquered areas to loyal officials from Abomey. However, royal control remained weak. Chiefs often retained autonomy, and the king's influence depended on tactical support of lesser local elites. Like Allada and Hueda, Dahomey in the seventeenth century functioned as a tributary polity relying on dispersed rural power bases.

== Colonial Benin (formerly, Republic of Dahomey) ==
Dahomey was a French colony of and a part of French West Africa from 1904 to 1959. Under the French, a port was constructed at Cotonou, and railroads were built. School facilities were expanded by Roman Catholic missions. In 1946, Dahomey became an overseas territory with its own parliament and representation in the French national assembly. On December 4, 1958, it became the Republic of Dahomey.

== Post-colonial Benin ==
=== Etymology ===
The Republic of Benin derives its name from one of the most powerful precolonial West African kingdoms, the Kingdom of Benin, which was centered in present-day Benin City, now located in Nigeria. According to some historians, the name Benin is a Portuguese rendering of the Itsekiri word oubinou, meaning "seat of royalty", which referred to the kingdom's capital. The term oubinou may itself stem from a combination of the Yoruba word oba ("king") and bini, the self-designation of the Edo people. Other sources suggest Benin originated from the Yoruba phrase ile-ibinu, meaning "land of disputes", possibly alluding to internal conflicts within the kingdom. A further hypothesis posits that bini may derive from the Arabic bani, meaning "sons of".[1]

Before 1975, the country was known as Dahomey, a name referencing one of the major historical kingdoms in the region. According to the political authorities at the time, this name was considered inappropriate for a multiethnic state, as it referred primarily to one of the country's major ethnic groups.[2]

=== 20th century ===
Between 1960 and 1972, a succession of military coups brought about many changes of government. The last of these brought to power Major Mathieu Kérékou as the head of a regime professing strict Marxist-Leninist principles. By 1975 the Republic of Dahomey changed its name to the People's Republic of Benin. The People's Revolutionary Party of Benin (PRPB) remained in complete power until the beginning of the 1990s. Kérékou, encouraged by France and other democratic powers, convened a national conference that introduced a new democratic constitution and held presidential and legislative elections. Kérékou's principal opponent at the presidential poll, and the ultimate victor, was Prime Minister Nicéphore Soglo. Supporters of Soglo also secured a majority in the National Assembly. Benin was thus the first African country to successfully complete the transition from a dictatorship to a pluralistic political system.

In the second round of National Assembly elections held in March 1995, Zoglo's political vehicle, the Parti de la Renaissance du Benin, was the largest single party but lacked an overall majority. The success of a party formed by supporters of ex-president Kérékou, who had officially retired from active politics, allowed him to stand successfully at both the 1996 and 2001 presidential elections.

=== 2000s ===
During the 2001 elections, however, alleged irregularities and dubious practices led to a boycott of the run-off poll by the main opposition candidates. The four top-ranking contenders following the first round presidential elections were Mathieu Kérékou (incumbent) 45.4%, Nicephore Soglo (former president) 27.1%, Adrien Houngbédji (National Assembly Speaker) 12.6%, and Bruno Amoussou (Minister of State) 8.6%. The second round balloting, originally scheduled for March 18, 2001, was postponed for days because both Soglo and Houngbedji withdrew, alleging electoral fraud. This left Kérékou to run against his own Minister of State, Amoussou, in what was termed a "friendly match."

In December 2002, Benin held its first municipal elections since before the institution of Marxism-Leninism. The process was smooth with the significant exception of the 12th district council for Cotonou, the contest that would ultimately determine who would be selected for the mayoralty of the capital city. That vote was marred by irregularities, and the electoral commission was forced to repeat that single election. Nicephore Soglo's Renaissance du Benin (RB) party won the new vote, paving the way for the former president to be elected Mayor of Cotonou by the new city council in February 2002.

National Assembly elections took place in March 2003 and were generally considered to be free and fair. Although there were some irregularities, these were not significant and did not greatly disrupt the proceedings or the results. These elections resulted in a loss of seats by RB—the primary opposition party. The other opposition parties, the Party for Democratic Renewal (PRD) led by the former Prime Minister Adrien Houngbedji and the Alliance Etoile (AE), joined the government coalition.

Former West African Development Bank Director Yayi Boni won the March 2006 election for the presidency in a field of 26 candidates. International observers including the United Nations, Economic Community of West African States (ECOWAS), and others called the election free, fair, and transparent. President Kérékou was barred from running under the 1990 constitution due to term and age limitations. President Yayi was inaugurated on April 6, 2006.

Benin held legislative elections on March 31, 2007, for the 83 seats in the National Assembly. The Force Cowrie for an Emerging Benin (FCBE), a coalition of parties, closely linked to President Yayi, won a plurality of the seats in the National Assembly, providing the president with considerable influence over the legislative agenda.

=== 2010s ===
In March 2011, President Boni Yayi was re-elected with 53.13 percent of vote in the first-round of the election. His main rival rejected the results, claiming widespread irregularities.

In October 2015, Benin's former President Mathieu Kerekou, who ruled the country a total of 28 years during his two spells as president (1972-1991 and 1996–2006), died at the age of 82.

After President Boni Yayi had served maximum two five-year terms, businessman Patrice Talon succeeded him. Talon defeated prime minister Lionel Zinsou, the candidate for Boni Yayi's Cowry Forces for an Emerging Benin (FCBE), in the March 2016 presidential election.

=== 2020s ===
In April 2021, incumbent Patrice Talon won re-election with 86 percent of the votes in the first round of the election. The change in election laws resulted in total control of parliament by president Talon's supporters.

In April 2025, the government of Benin adopted a law, recognizing 16 kingdoms, 80 senior chiefs and 10 traditional chiefs through a new law, adopted in March 2025. The pre-colonial period, set at 1894 for the south and 1897 for the north of Benin, served as a historical reference for the bill to institutionalize chieftaincy in Benin and to frame the rules on traditional territories.

== See also ==
- History of Africa
- History of West Africa
- List of heads of government of Benin
- List of heads of state of Benin
- Politics of Benin
- Cotonou history and timeline
