= 2019 Beninese parliamentary election =

- 28 April 2019
- All 83 seats in the National Assembly; 42 seats needed for a majority
- Turnout: 27.12%
| Party | Leader | Seats |
|---|---|---|
| Progressive Union | Bruno Amoussou | 47 |
| Republican Bloc | Jean-Michel Abimbola | 36 |
This lists parties that won seats. See the complete results below.
Results by constituency
| Speaker before | Speaker after |
|---|---|
| Adrien Houngbédji; PRD | Louis Vlavonou; UP |

Parliamentary elections were held in Benin on 28 April 2019.

== Background ==
The election date was set at a meeting of the Council of Ministers on 9 January 2019, with the term of the National Assembly elected in 2015 due to expire in March 2019.

== Electoral system ==
The 83 members of the National Assembly are elected by proportional representation in 24 multi-member constituencies, based on the country's departments. A controversial new electoral code introduced in July 2018 saw the creation of an electoral threshold of 10% of the national vote to enter parliament (higher than most countries which use a threshold), whilst the deposit required for a parliamentary list was increased from 8.3 million francs to 249 million francs (equivalent to roughly 380,000 euros). The reforms were aimed at reducing the large number of active political parties, which at the time numbered around 200.

According to Freedom House, from 2019 on Benin ceased to be an electoral democracy.

== Campaign ==
Due to the higher electoral threshold, several new parties and blocs were formed prior to the elections. The Progressive Union was formed by a merger of over 20 parties and alliances, including Union Makes the Nation, the Benin Rebirth Party, the Social Democratic Party, Key Force, the Congress of People for Progress, the United Democratic Forces, the Union for Relief, the Union for Democracy and National Solidarity, the Scout Alliance and the Union for Benin.

Despite a call from Cowry Forces for an Emerging Benin leader and former President Thomas Boni Yayi for unity amongst opposition parties, it was reported that several opposition parties appeared set to run alone, including the Democratic Renewal Party (PRD).

Although it was announced on 16 January 2019 that the opposition would form a single bloc to participate in the elections, only two blocs were registered to contest the elections – the Republican Bloc and the Progressive Union, both of which were linked to President Patrice Talon. The election commission rejected the applications of five opposition groups, including the PRD, Cowry Forces for the Development of Benin, Union for the Development of Benin, Moele-Bénin and the Social-Liberal Union.

== Conduct ==
Protests against the new electoral law were banned, with protesters defying the ban arrested. Former presidents Nicéphore Soglo and Thomas Boni Yayi both spoke at a protest event in Cotonou, at which police used tear gas. Prior to the elections, several opposition activists and political journalists were also arrested.

On election day, NetBlocks reported the blocking of social media platforms and the subsequent disconnection of nearly all internet connectivity in the country.

The turnout of 23% (if only valid votes are considered) was a significant drop from 65% from the previous election and the lowest in an election since Benin adopted democracy.

== Results ==
Voting did not take place in 39 of the country's 546 arrondissements due to local incidents.

| Party | Votes | % | Seats |
|---|---|---|---|
| Progressive Union | | | 47 |
| Republican Bloc | | | 36 |
| Total | | | 83 |
| Total votes | 1,353,955 | – | |
| Registered voters/turnout | 4,992,399 | 27.12 | |
Source: Constitutional Court
