= 2016 Beninese presidential election =

Election of Patrice Talon

- 6 March 2016 (first round); 20 March 2016 (second round)
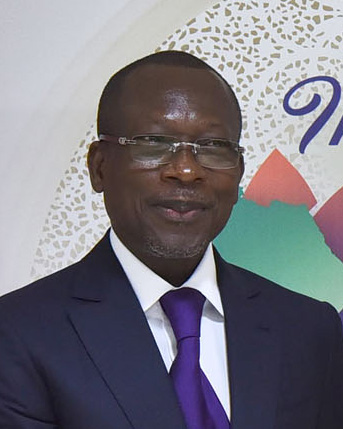

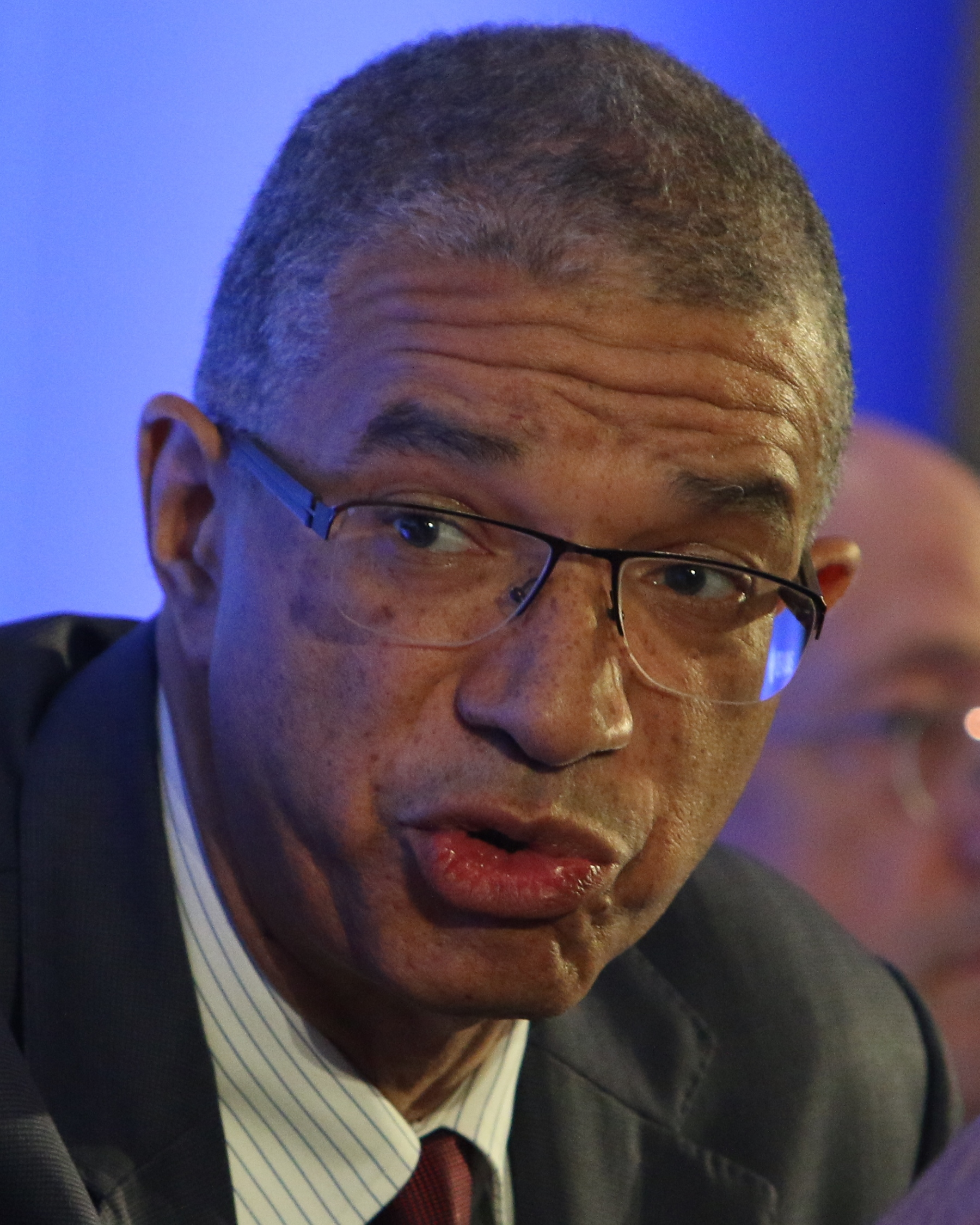
Nominee	Patrice Talon	Lionel Zinsou
Party	Independent	FCBE
Popular vote	2,030,941	1,076,061
Percentage	65.37%	34.63%
President before election
Yayi Boni
FCBE
Elected President
Patrice Talon
Independent

Presidential elections were held in Benin on 6 March 2016, having been delayed by one week due to logistical constraints. Incumbent president Thomas Boni Yayi was at the end of his second presidential term and was constitutionally barred from running for a third. The elections grabbed the interest of many of the country's top businessmen, resulting in over 30 candidates trying to run for the presidency. A second round was held on 20 March, in which businessman Patrice Talon defeated Prime Minister Lionel Zinsou.

== Background ==
During 2015 and 2016 the leaders of some African countries undertook efforts to remain in power after decades of rule; a referendum in Rwanda resulted in Paul Kagame being allowed to remain in power, there was unrest in Burundi over President Pierre Nkurunziza's plans to run for a third term, whilst the long-term presidents of Uganda and the Republic of the Congo ran for office again. However, in West Africa, the long-term president of Burkina Faso was removed from office and Nigerian President Goodluck Jonathan left office after losing an election.

The body charged with producing the new voter cards failed to live up to their deadlines of distributing cards. This caused the Constitutional Court to first delay the elections by a week, and then make the ruling that old voter cards issued prior to the 2011 elections would also be accepted as the court feared that voters might be disenfranchised.

== Campaign ==
Campaigning was only permitted for a 15-day period directly before the elections. The Constitutional Court sanctioned a campaign period from 19 February to 4 March 2016.

=== Candidates ===
The Résoatao Party selected its candidate via party primaries held on 7 November 2015; its leader and sole MP Mohamed Atao Hinnouho was chosen with 141 votes, with the president of the party's women's branch Eliane Saizonou receiving 14 votes and the party's first councillor Félix Tohoyessou eight.

Prime Minister Lionel Zinsou announced on 1 December 2015 that he would stand as the candidate of the Cowry Forces for an Emerging Benin, the party of President Yayi Boni, in the 2016 presidential election. He said that he would focus on financing agriculture and helping informal workers obtain formal employment. Zinsou's French background attracted some criticism. At a meeting of a grouping of Zinsou's opponents held on 5 January 2016, a trade union leader denounced Zinsou as "a colonizer" who was "parachuted in ... to safeguard the economic crimes of Boni Yayi". The government defended Zinsou, stressing that he was "a full citizen of Benin" and that arguing that his opponents were appealing to "base instincts of hatred, racism, fear and intolerance."

The Democratic Renewal Party, the third party in parliament led by Adrien Houngbédji, announced on 30 January 2016 that it would support Lionel Zinsou. Independent candidates included the businessmen Patrice Talon and Sebastien Adjavon.

The Autonomous National Electoral Commission (CENA) announced on 13 January 2016 that 48 people had filed the necessary paperwork to stand as presidential candidates, although their candidacies still needed to be approved by the Constitutional Court. Each candidate had to submit health certificates that prove a clean bill of health and deposit a filing fee of an equivalent $25,000. The court cleared 36 candidates and dropped 11 candidates for not providing sufficient evidence for various standard requirements. Three further candidates dropped from the race prior to the allocated campaigning period.

== Results ==
Provisional results released on 8 March 2016 showed Lionel Zinsou placing first with 28.4% of the vote. Patrice Talon placed second with 24.8% and Sebastien Ajavon placed third with 23.03%. Zinsou was therefore expected to face Talon in a second round of voting.

For the second round, Talon received the support of 24 out of 32 of the defeated first round candidates. Most notably, he received the backing of Ajavon. The second round was held on 20 March 2016. Saying that the results "point to a decisive victory for Patrice Talon", Zinsou quickly conceded defeat and congratulated Talon.

The Constitutional Court validated the results on 25 March.

Candidate	Party	First round		Second round	
Candidate	Party	Votes	%	Votes	%
Lionel Zinsou	Cowry Forces for an Emerging Benin	858,080	28.43	1,076,061	34.63
Patrice Talon	Independent	746,528	24.73	2,030,941	65.37
Sébastien Ajavon	Independent	693,084	22.96		
Abdoulaye Bio-Tchané	Alliance for a Triumphant Benin	262,389	8.69		
Pascal Koupaki	New Consciousness Rally	177,251	5.87		
Robert Gbian	Generations for Republican Governance	46,634	1.54		
Fernand Amoussou	Alliance of Forces of the Future	35,390	1.17		
Issa Salifou	Union for Relief	30,855	1.02		
Aké Natonde	Path of Benin	26,501	0.88		
Nassirou Bako Arifari	Amana Alliance	19,012	0.63		
Mohamed Atao Hinnouho	Résoatao Party	12,441	0.41		
Saliou Youssao Aboudou		12,215	0.40		
Bertin Koovi	Iroko Alliance	11,292	0.37		
Richard Senou		8,123	0.27		
Karimou Chabi Sika	Independent	7,351	0.24		
Zul-Kifl Salami	National Party of Congress	6,782	0.22		
Elisabeth Agbossaga	Union for Development and Reform	5,802	0.19		
Issifou Kogui N'douro	Independent	5,130	0.17		
Zacharie Cyriaque Goudali	6 May Movement	4,998	0.17		
Kamarou Fassassi	Independent	4,820	0.16		
Gabriel Ayivi Adjavon		4,371	0.14		
Marcel de Souza	Republican Front of Benin	4,247	0.14		
Azizou El-Hadj Issa	Independent	4,143	0.14		
Omer Rustique Guezo		3,999	0.13		
Jean-Alexandre Hountondji	New March	3,893	0.13		
Daniel Edah	Movement for Prosperity and Solidarity	3,694	0.12		
Marie-Elise Gbèdo		3,597	0.12		
Christian Enock Lagnide		3,391	0.11		
Issa Badarou Soule		3,380	0.11		
Simon Pierre Adovelande	Independent	2,858	0.09		
Moudjaidou Soumanou Issoufou		2,648	0.09		
Gatien Houngbedji	Union for Economic and Social Development	2,287	0.08		
Kessile Tchala Sare		1,272	0.04		
Total		3,018,458	100.00	3,107,002	100.00
Valid votes		3,018,458	96.28	3,107,002	98.99
Invalid/blank votes		116,530	3.72	31,622	1.01
Total votes		3,134,988	100.00	3,138,624	100.00
Registered voters/turnout		4,746,348	66.05	4,746,348	66.13
Source: Constitutional Court (first round, second round)

== Aftermath ==
Speaking on the same day that the Constitutional Court confirmed the results, Talon said that he would "first and foremost tackle constitutional reform", discussing his plan to limit presidents to a single term of five years in order to combat "complacency". He also said that he planned to slash the size of the government from 28 to 16 members. He was sworn in on 6 April 2016, and the composition of his government was announced later in the day. There was no prime minister, and two defeated presidential candidates who had backed Talon in the second round, Pascal Koupaki and Abdoulaye Bio-Tchane, were appointed to key posts: Koupaki as Secretary-General of the Presidency and Bio-Tchane as Minister of State for Planning and Development.
