= Sun Alliance (political alliance) =

- Founded: 21 December 2014
- National Assembly: 0 / 109

The Sun Alliance (French: Alliance Soleil, AS) was a political alliance in Benin led by Sacca Lafia.

== History ==
The AS was established on 21 December 2014 as an alliance of the Union for Democracy and National Solidarity (UDSN), the Union for Relief (UPR) and Hope Force (FE), three parties based in the north of Benin. The UPR and FE had contested the 2011 parliamentary elections together, winning two seats.

In the April 2015 parliamentary elections the AS received 7% of the vote, winning four seats.

The alliance was subsequently dissolved, with the UDSN and UPR merging into the Progressive Union Renewal prior to the 2019 parliamentary elections.
