= 2015 Beninese parliamentary election =

- 26 April 2015
Party	Leader	Vote %	Seats	+/–
FCBE–Amana	Nassirou Bako Arifari	30.19	33	−10
UN	Bruno Amoussou	14.35	13	−17
PRD	Adrien Houngbédji	10.57	10	
AND	Valentin Houdé	7.64	5	
RB–RP	Léhady Soglo	7.09	7	
Sun	Sacca Lafia	6.66	4	+2
FDU	Mathurin Nago	4.00	4	
ABT	Abdoulaye Bio-Tchané	3.70	2	
Scout	Edmond Agoua	3.42	2	
UB	Orou Sé Guéné	2.90	2	0
Résoatao Party	Mohamed Atao Hinnouho	2.16	1	
This lists parties that won seats. See the complete results below.

Parliamentary elections were held in Benin on 26 April 2015.

== Electoral system ==
The 83 members of the National Assembly are elected in 24 multi-member constituencies, based on the country's departments. Seats are allocated using proportional representation based on the simple quotient, with remaining seats assigned using the largest remainder method.

== Conduct ==
Observers from the African Union stated that the elections were generally transparent, despite some organisational challenges.

== Results ==
Party	Votes	%	Seats	+/–
Cowry Forces for an Emerging Benin–Amana Alliance	889,362	30.19	33	–10
Union Makes the Nation	422,715	14.35	13	–17
Democratic Renewal Party	311,453	10.57	10	–
National Alliance for Development and Democracy	225,145	7.64	5	–
Benin Rebirth Party–Patriotic Revival Party	208,909	7.09	7	–
Sun Alliance	196,119	6.66	4	+2
United Democratic Forces	117,970	4.00	4	–
Alliance for a Triumphant Benin	108,915	3.70	2	–
Scout Alliance	100,741	3.42	2	–
Union for Benin	85,363	2.90	2	0
Résoatao Party	63,668	2.16	1	New
Patriotic Alliance for Awakening and Union	44,501	1.51	0	New
Union for Democracy and Development	33,377	1.13	0	New
Union for Democracy and Reform	30,329	1.03	0	New
Union of Engaged Forces for Development	27,454	0.93	0	New
New Hope for Benin	20,844	0.71	0	New
Rally of Republicans	19,666	0.67	0	New
Movement of Awakening the Conscience of Citizens and the Alternative	14,597	0.50	0	New
Chameleon Alliance	12,867	0.44	0	New
Alliance for New Governance	12,087	0.41	0	New
Total	2,946,082	100.00	83	0
Registered voters/turnout	4,470,591	–		
Source: Constitutional Court of Benin, Visages du Benin

== Aftermath ==
When the National Assembly began meeting for its new term, Adrien Houngbédji was elected as President of the National Assembly on the night of 19–20 May 2015; as the candidate representing the opposition, he received 42 votes, while the candidate representing President Yayi Boni's supporters, Komi Koutché, received 41. Members of the opposition dominated the Bureau of the National Assembly, obtaining six of its seven posts.
