= Antoine Idji Kolawolé =

Beninese politician

Antoine Idji Kolawolé (born 1946) is a Beninese politician. He was the minister of foreign affairs of Benin from 1998 to 2003 and the President of the National Assembly from 2003 to 2007.

== Political career ==
Kolawolé was born in 1946 in Illikimou, near Kétou, Benin. He first received a degree in journalism from the Université de Fribourg in Switzerland in 1972, before receiving a bachelor's degree in law from the same university in 1973. He then received an advanced degree in law from Paris 1 Panthéon-Sorbonne University in France in 1976. Under President Mathieu Kérékou, Kolawolé served as Minister of Foreign Affairs from May 1998 to May 2003, when he resigned. In the March 2003 parliamentary election, his party, the African Movement for Development and Progress (MADEP), participated in the Presidential Movement, which supported Kérékou, and Kolawolé was elected as President of the National Assembly on April 25, 2003.

Kolawolé served as First Vice-President of MADEP, and in September 2005 he was designated as the party's presidential candidate for the March 2006 presidential election. In the election, he took fifth place with 3.25% of the vote in the first round.

He was re-elected to the National Assembly in the March 2007 parliamentary election as part of the Alliance for a Dynamic Democracy. Mathurin Nago was elected by the National Assembly to succeed Kolawolé as its President on May 3, 2007.

In the April 2015 parliamentary election, he was re-elected to the National Assembly as a candidate of the Union Makes the Nation coalition in the 21st constituency. In 2016, he commentated on relations with the United States. He praised Barack Obama for his contributions to Africa and for advancing justice for minorities, but expressed concern regarding Donald Trump and warned that he could undermine U.S. relations with Africa. However, he still called for free trade with the United States and expansion of U.S. programs.

He announced prior to the 2019 Beninese parliamentary election that he would not run as a candidate and would give up his seat in favor of former mayor Jean Pierre Babatoundé and for other young candidates of the Progressive Union Renewal party.
