= Sacca Lafia =

Beninese politician

- Born: October 21, 1944 (age 81)
- Occupation: Politician

Sacca Lafia (born October 21, 1944) is a Beninese politician who has served in the government of Benin as Minister of the Interior since 2016. Previously he was Minister of Mines, Energy, and Water under President Yayi Boni, beginning in 2007. He is president of the Union for Democracy and National Solidarity (UDS), a political party.

== Life and career ==
A veterinarian by training, Lafia was first elected to the National Assembly of Benin in the March 1999 parliamentary election, on which occasion he was one of four Star Alliance (Alliance Etoile) candidates to be elected. He was the UDS candidate in the March 2001 presidential election, receiving 1.20% of the vote and fifth place, and in the March 2003 parliamentary election he was one of three Star Alliance candidates elected to the National Assembly. In the March 2007 parliamentary election, Lafia was re-elected to the National Assembly as a candidate of the Cauris Forces for an Emerging Benin. He also served as first vice-president of the National Assembly.

In the government of President Yayi Boni named on June 17, 2007, Lafia was appointed as Minister of Mines, Energy, and Water.

In the April 2015 parliamentary election, he was re-elected to the National Assembly as a Sun Alliance candidate in the 8th constituency.

When Patrice Talon took office as President of Benin on 6 April 2016, he appointed Lafia as Minister of the Interior and Public Security.
