= Hélène Aholou Keke =

Beninese lawyer and politician

Member of the National Assembly of Benin
- In office 2007–2011, 2011–2015

Personal details
- Occupation: lawyer

Hélène Aholou Keke is a lawyer and politician in Benin.

== Biography ==
She specialised in family law and was called to the bar for the first time in Paris, France. She was the first woman to serve as the President of the Benin Bar Association. She was called to the bar of Cotonou in 2008. For more than 20 years she worked as a lawyer for the Beninese government.

Keke has served as a member of the National Assembly of Benin in its fifth (2007–2011) and sixth (2011–2015) legislatures. She was president of the Assembly's Commission of Laws and Human Rights in December 2012 when the death penalty was abolished. Keke resigned from the governing Cowry Forces for an Emerging Benin party in 2015.

She raised electoral irregularities with the press and the authorities in February 2016 ahead of the 2016 Beninese presidential election, including the registering of 51 more polling stations than were authorised by law. In May 2016 she was appointed as one of 30 members of the National Commission for Political and Institutional Reform by new, independent President Patrice Talon.
