= Colette Sénami Agossou Houeto =

Beninese educator, feminist poet and politician (1939–2026)

Colette Sénami Agossou Houeto (6 March 1939 – 29 September 2026) was a Beninese educator, feminist poet and politician. She was Minister of Primary and Secondary Education in Boni Yayi's first government.

== Life and career ==
Colette Houeto was born in Porto-Novo, Ouémé Department on 6 March 1939. She attended local primary schools before going to secondary school in Cotonou. She attended the University of Strasbourg and later LMU Munich. In Benin, she served as Director of the National Institute of Training and Research into Education from 1977 to 1981. She also wrote a volume of poetry, published in 1981. From 1986 to 1991, she worked with the African Development Bank, aiming to integrate women into Benin's development program.

She was active in Adrien Houngbédji's Democratic Renewal Party.

Houeto died on 29 September 2026, at the age of 87.

== Works ==
- 'La femme, source de vie dans l'Afrique traditionnelle', in La Civilisation de la femme dans la tradition africaine, Paris: Présence africaine, 1975
- 'Education et mass-media', Présence Africaine, No. 95 (1975), pp.428-40
- L'aube sur les cactus. Porto-Novo, Bénin, 1981. Preface by Jean Pliya. Illustrated by Jean-Claude Lespingal.
- 'Women and Education: the Case of Benin', EDUAFRICA, Vol. 8 (1982), pp.169-179
