= Scout Alliance =

Political alliance in Benin

Scout Alliance Alliance Éclaireur
- President: Edmond Agoua (at founding)
- General Secretary: Cyriaque Tossa (at founding)
- Governing body: Eleven-member executive bureau (at founding)
- Founder: Edmond Agoua
- Founded: 20 February 2015
- Parliamentary group (2015): Republic and National Unity (RUN)
- National Assembly (2015 election): 2 / 83

Election symbol
- Red torch

The Scout Alliance (French: Alliance Éclaireur) was a political alliance in Benin, founded in February 2015 with Edmond Agoua as president. It won two seats in the National Assembly at the 2015 parliamentary election. In December 2018, La Nation reported that the alliance had merged into the newly formed Progressive Union.

== History ==
The alliance was launched at the Palais des congrès in Cotonou on 20 February 2015. Agoua, leader of the Party for Democracy and Social Progress, was elected president of its eleven-member executive bureau. Cyriaque Tossa was appointed secretary-general. Its symbol was a red torch.

In the parliamentary election on 26 April 2015, the alliance received 100,741 votes, or 3.42% of the total, and won two of the National Assembly's 83 seats. Its elected representatives were Agoua and Gounou Salifou Abdoulaye. Its deputies joined the Republic and National Unity parliamentary group (République et Unité Nationale, RUN), which supported President Thomas Boni Yayi. The group also included deputies from the Cowry Forces for an Emerging Benin, the Union for Benin and the National Alliance for Democracy and Development.

In November 2018, Agoua's reported decision to join the Progressive Bloc was opposed by Salomon Chabi, president of the New Alliance for Development, a member of the alliance. Chabi said that the member organisations had not met to agree on the alliance's political direction. The Progressive Union held its founding congress in Cotonou on 1 December 2018. La Nation listed the Scout Alliance among the parties and movements that dissolved into the new party.

== Composition ==
The founding parties and movements listed by La Presse du Jour were:

- Parti pour la démocratie et le progrès social (PDPS)
- Parti de la rénovation pour la solidarité et le progrès (PRSP)
- Coalition pour un Bénin émergent (CBE)
- Front d'action commun pour l'émergence d'une éthique nouvelle au Bénin (FACEEN-Bénin)
- Nouvelle Alliance pour le développement (NAD)
- Parti pour l'impulsion de la solidarité agissante et du développement (PISAD)
- Mouvement pour la social-démocratie (MSD)
- Parti de l'éveil collectif pour un lendemain meilleur (PECLEM)
- Parti démocratique Wadedji (PDW)
- Parti libéral réformateur (PLR)
- Génération-Action-Progrès (GAP)
- Les Jeunes turcs de la République (JTR)
- Mouvement pour la solidarité et le développement durable (MSDD)
- MJEC
