= Amos Elegbe =

Beninese politician (1947–2025)

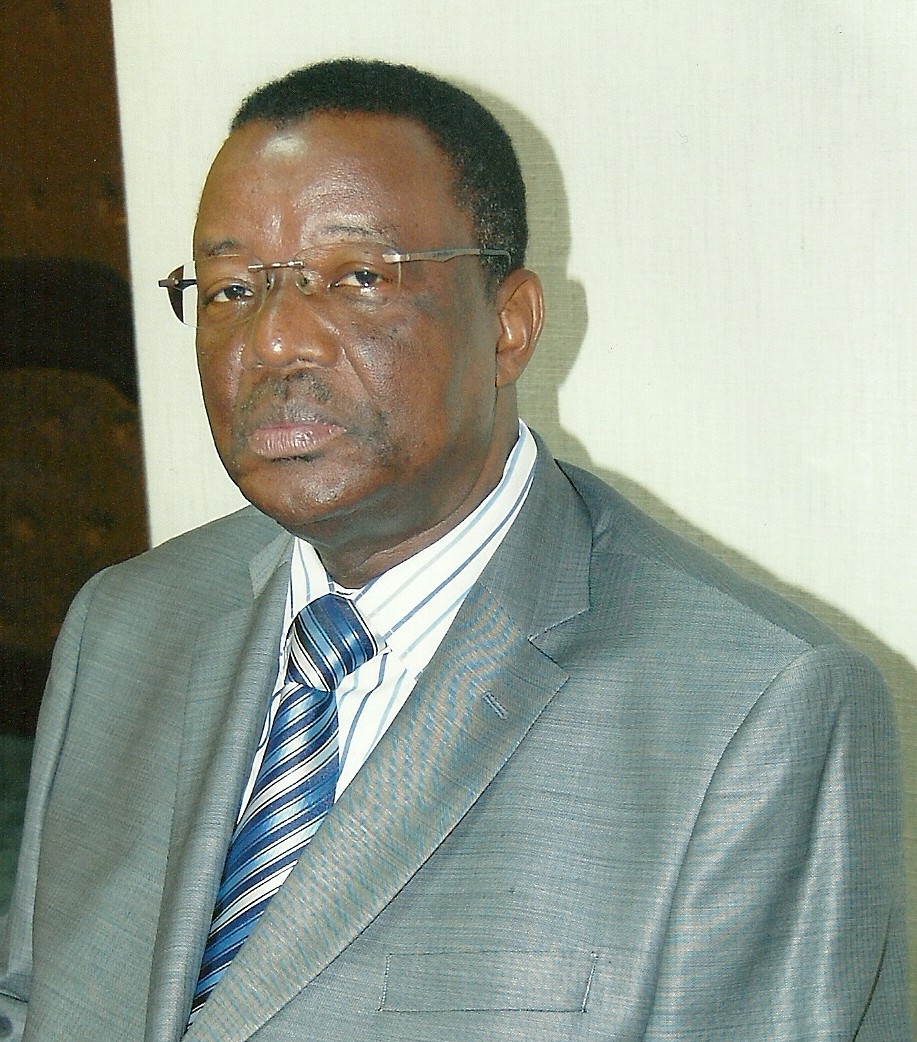
- Elegbe in 2012

Minister of Commerce, Artisanry, and Tourism
- In office 4 August 1989 – February 1990

Minister of Culture, Artisanry, and Tourism
- In office 2001–2003

Member of the National Assembly of Benin
- In office 1991–1995

Personal details
- Born: 4 April 1947 Savè, French Dahomey, French West Africa
- Died: 8 May 2025 (aged 78)
- Political party: FCBE
- Education: University of Toulouse-Jean Jaurès
- Occupation: Academic

Amos Elegbe (4 April 1947 – 8 May 2025) was a Beninese academic and politician of the Cowry Forces for an Emerging Benin (FCBE).

== Life and career ==
Born in Savè on 4 April 1947, Elegbe earned a doctorate in urban studies from the University of Toulouse-Jean Jaurès. For 35 years, he taught urban planning and management at the National University of Benin. On 4 August 1989, he was nominated by President Mathieu Kérékou to serve as Minister of Commerce, Artisanry, and Tourism. In 1991, he was elected to the National Assembly. He went on to serve as Minister of Culture, Artisanry, and Tourism from 2001 to 2003, a time period in which he earned the title of "Father of Beninese Tourism". He oversaw the development of the tourism sector along the Route des Pêches. The titled also stemmed from his work with the Office national du tourisme et de l'hôtellerie, of which he served as director-general from 1974 to 1982. In 2011, he retired from his professional career.

Elegbe died on 8 May 2025, at the age of 78.

== Publications ==
- Urbanisme dirigé dans l'agglomération Toulousaine, Centre Interdisciplinaire d'Études Urbaines (1972)
- Aménagement et urbanisme des petites villes du centre Dahomey : cas concret de Savè (1975)
- Élaboration des Plans Directeurs d'Urbanisme des Villes de Porto-Novo, Lokossa, Abomey, Bohicon, Djougou, Parakou et Cotonou (1986)
- L'Urbanisme en Afrique : Sa définition, son Contenu, et son Rôle dans la Politique d'Aménagement du Territoire National (1989)
- Élaboration des Plans Directeurs d'Urbanisme des Villes Secondaires du Bénin et des Registres Fonciers Urbains de Cotonou, Porto-Novo, Parakou (1996)
- Les aides publiques internationales au Bénin de 1985 à 1995 : les grandes orientations (1997)
- L'Étude sur la Stratégie Sectorielle d'Investissement Public en milieu urbain au Bénin (1997)
- La Culture dans la Politique nationale de Développement (2003)
- L'Intégration de l'Économie de la culture dans les stratégies et les politiques de développement des pays du sud : Définition du rôle des différents acteurs dans la mise en œuvre des actions en faveur du développement des industries culturelles (2004)
- Gouvernance Urbaine et Nouvelles Problématiques de la Recherche dans les Villes du Sud (2004)
- Les Nouveaux types de rapports villes-campagnes en Afrique Subsaharienne : dualisme et complémentarité (2007)

== Distinctions ==
- Grand Officer of the National Order of Benin (2016)
  - Knight in 1997
- Officer of the Order of La Pléiade
