= Mathurin Nago =

Beninese politician

Mathurin Coffi Nago is a Beninese politician who was President of the National Assembly of Benin from 2007 to 2015. Previously he was Minister of Higher Education and Vocational Training from 2006 to 2007.

== Political career ==
As a candidate of the Union for Democracy and National Solidarity, Nago was elected to the National Assembly in the 1995 parliamentary election. He served in the National Assembly until the end of the parliamentary term in 1999, and during that period he was a member of the National Assembly's Commission of Planning, Equipment and Production. He has also been Dean of the Faculty of Agricultural Sciences of Benin. He became Minister of Higher Education and Vocational Training in April 2006 as part of President Yayi Boni's first government. He participated in the Cauris Forces for an Emerging Benin (FCBE), which supported Boni, in the March 2007 parliamentary election, and was elected to a seat in the National Assembly. Afterwards, he was elected as President of the National Assembly on 3 May 2007; he received 45 votes against 34 for Bruno Amoussou. Nago had one month to choose between his position as a minister and his National Assembly seat, and on 22 May Nago resigned from the government, along with four other ministers who had been elected to the National Assembly, as they had been instructed to do by Boni.

Nago was elected as President of the Union for Progress and Democracy (UPD-Gamesu) at its first ordinary congress on 18 August 2007.

Re-elected to the National Assembly in the March 2011 parliamentary election as a candidate of the FCBE, Nago was then re-elected as President of the National Assembly on 21 May 2011. There were 60 votes in favor of his candidacy, two against, and two abstentions.

Amidst a dispute over a potential change to the constitution, Nago quit the FCBE in February 2015, and on 14 March 2015 he launched a new alliance of parties, the United Democratic Forces (FDU), which intended to participate in the April 2015 parliamentary election. In the election, Nago was re-elected to the National Assembly as an FDU candidate in the 18th constituency. When the National Assembly began meeting for its new term, opposition leader Adrien Houngbédji was elected as President of the National Assembly on the night of 19–20 May 2015, and he took office on 22 May, succeeding Nago.
