= Bruno Amoussou =

Beninese politician

President of the National Assembly of Benin
- In office 1995–1999

Minister of State for Planning and Prospective Development
- In office 1999–2005

Personal details
- Born: 2 July 1939 (age 87) Djakotomey, Dahomey, French West Africa
- Party: Social Democratic Party
- Occupation: politician
- Awards: Grand Officer of the National Order of Benin

Bruno Ange-Marie Amoussou (born 2 July 1939) is a Beninese politician who was President of the National Assembly of Benin from 1995 to 1999 and Minister of State for Planning and Prospective Development under President Mathieu Kérékou from 1999 to 2005. He is currently a Deputy in the National Assembly. As the long-time leader of the Social Democratic Party (PSD), Amoussou stood as a presidential candidate in 1991, 1996, 2001, and 2006.

== Political career ==
Amoussou was born in Djakotomey in south-western Benin. In the 1991 presidential election, he received 5.8% of the vote and fourth place, therefore failing to qualify for the second round. Following the March 1995 parliamentary election, he was elected as President of the National Assembly on 12 June 1995. During his political career, his support was locally concentrated in his native southwest, but it was sufficient to enable him to be a consistent player on the political scene during the 1990s and 2000s. He placed fourth in the March 1996 presidential election with 7.8% of the vote; along with third-place finisher Houngbédji, Amoussou backed Kérékou against President Nicéphore Soglo for the second round of the election, and Kérékou was victorious.

Amoussou was re-elected to the National Assembly in the March 1999 parliamentary election, but on 29 April 1999, he was defeated in his bid for re-election as President of the National Assembly by Adrien Houngbédji in a parliamentary vote, despite being the favored candidate of Kérékou for the position. Amoussou received 38 votes against 45 for Houngbédji. Under Kérékou, Amoussou was appointed as Minister of Development and Planning in 1999. The PSD held its first ordinary congress in early 2000, and Amoussou was elected as the party's president.

In the first round of the March 2001 presidential election, he placed fourth yet again with 8.6% of the vote, but participated in the runoff when the second- and third-placed candidates, Soglo and Houngbédji, withdrew from the race. Running against heavily favoured incumbent Kérékou, to whom he had previously given his support for the second round, Amoussou received nearly 16% of the vote. By providing token opposition to Kérékou after the President's most important opponents decided to boycott the vote, he gave the outcome a limited measure of legitimacy that it would have otherwise lacked. He remained Minister of Development and Planning until 2005.

Amoussou ran again in the March 2006 presidential election, obtaining 16.29% of the vote and placing third. He supported Yayi Boni in the second round.

In the March 2007 parliamentary election, Amoussou and the PSD participated in the Alliance for a Dynamic Democracy, and Amoussou was again elected to a seat. Afterwards he was again a candidate for President of the National Assembly, losing to Mathurin Nago of the Cauris Forces for an Emerging Benin in a vote on 3 May 2007. Amoussou received 34 votes, while Nago received 45.

At the PSD's second ordinary congress in mid-2009, Amoussou was re-elected as PSD President. He was re-elected to the National Assembly in the March 2011 parliamentary election.

Amoussou resigned as PSD President on 22 January 2012. In the April 2015 parliamentary election, he was re-elected to the National Assembly as a candidate of the Union Makes the Nation coalition in the 11th constituency.

He has used the campaign slogan, "He knows the country."

In July 2022, Bruno Amoussou retired and left the presidency of the UP to Joseph Djogbenou.
