= G13 Baobab Alliance =

The G13 Baobab Alliance (French: Alliance G13 Baobab, AG13B) is a political alliance in Benin.

== History ==
The Group of 13 (G13) was established in 2008 by a group of influential MPs led by Salifou Issa. Primarily representing business interests, it rejected a place in President Yayi Boni's cabinet and joined the G4, Key Force and several minor parties that had pledged to unseat Boni in the 2011 elections. It was speculated that the G13 would put forward Abdoulaye Bio-Tchané as its candidate in the election. Although Bio-Tchané subsequently ran as an independent, he was supported by some party members not linked with the Union for Relief.

Prior to the 2011 parliamentary elections, the G13 Baobab Alliance was formed by independent candidates. It received 6% of the vote, winning two seats, with Venance Lubin Gnigla, chairman of the Coalition for an Emerging Benin (CBE), and Valentin Aditi Houdé becoming MPs for the alliance.
