= National Alliance for Development and Democracy =

- Founded: 31 May 2014
- Ideology: Big tent
- National Assembly of Benin: 0 / 109

The National Alliance for Development and Democracy (French: Alliance nationale pour le développement et la démocratie, AND) is a political alliance in Benin. Its current president is Valentin Aditi Houde and is supportive of the Yayi Boni government.

== History ==
The AND was formed on 31 May 2014, as an alliance of 17 parties. It received 7.6% of the vote in the 2015 parliamentary elections, winning five seats.

== Member parties ==
Member parties include:

- Citizen's Union for the Homeland
- Democratic Rally of Benin
- Forces of Progress
- Mission of Young Patriots for Development
- Mobilisation of United Forces for Development
- Movement for the Republic and Ethics
- Movement of Reflection and Action for Development
- Movement for Democracy and Solidarity
- Mouvement La Conscience Missité
- Party of Renovation for Solidarity and Progress
- Rally for a United Benin
- Rally for Progress and Renewal
- Sentinel of the Republic
- Union for Work and Democracy
- Union of Democratic Forces for Development
- Union of Movements and Association of Abomey-Calavi
- Vision and Hope for an Emergent Benin
