= United Democratic Forces (Benin) =

The United Democratic Forces (French: Forces Démocratiques Unies, FDU) was a political alliance in Benin led by Mathurin Nago.

== History ==
In response to president Yayi Boni's potential constitution change to allow him to run for a third term, Nago left the Cowry Forces for an Emerging Benin. The FDU was established on 9 February 2015 as an alliance of the Union for Progress and Democracy, Impulse for a New Vision of the Republic, the Party for Progress and Democracy and the Party for Democracy and Solidarity, all of which had previously been part of the Cowry Forces for an Emerging Benin. The alliance won four seats in the 2015 parliamentary elections.

In December 2018, prior to the 2019 parliamentary elections, the alliance merged into the Progressive Union.
