= Pascal Koupaki =

Beninese politician

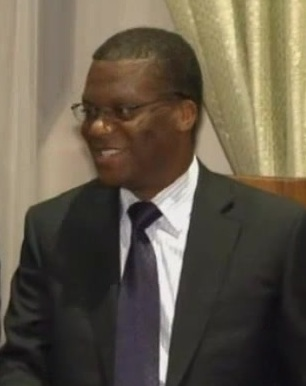

Prime Minister of Benin
- In office 28 May 2011 – 11 August 2013
- President: Thomas Boni Yayi
- Preceded by: Adrien Houngbédji (1998)
- Succeeded by: Lionel Zinsou (2015)

Personal details
- Born: May 18, 1951 (age 73); Cotonou, Dahomey (now Benin)
- Political party: Cowry Forces for an Emerging Benin

Pascal Irénée Koupaki (born 18 May 1951) is a Beninese politician who served as Prime Minister of Benin from May 2011 to August 2013. Koupaki worked as an official at the Central Bank of West African States (BCEAO) and the International Monetary Fund (IMF), and he was Director of the Cabinet of the Prime Minister from 1996 to 1998. Under President Yayi Boni, Koupaki was Minister of Finance from 2006 to 2007 and then Minister of State for the Exploration, Development, and Evaluation of Public Policy from 2007 to 2011.

Under President Patrice Talon, Koupaki has been Secretary-General of the Presidency since 2016.

== Career ==
Koupaki worked in Dakar at the BCEAO from September 1979 to December 1990, holding a series of high-level posts. Beginning in December 1990, he worked as Deputy Director of the Cabinet of Alassane Ouattara, the Prime Minister of Côte d'Ivoire. After Ouattara left office, Koupaki took a position at the IMF in September 1994; he then served as Director of the Cabinet of the Prime Minister of Benin, Adrien Houngbedji, from April 1996 to May 1998.

Following Houngbedji's resignation in May 1998, Koupaki worked at the BCEAO again; he was Director of the Research Department at the BCEAO and then Special Adviser to the Governor, as well as Director of the Department of Research and the Mint. He left the BCEAO when Yayi Boni took office as President of Benin and appointed Koupaki to the government as Minister of Finance in April 2006. A year later, Koupaki was moved to the post of Minister of State for the Exploration, Development, and Evaluation of Public Policy on 17 June 2007; he remained in the latter post until his appointment as Prime Minister on 28 May 2011. Having already been ranked second in protocol, after Boni, it was observed that Koupaki had already effectively been a prime minister and that the appointment merely formalized the situation.

Koupaki was viewed as a potential successor to Boni, but beginning in 2012 there was speculation in the press that he had "fallen out of favour". President Boni dismissed Koupaki and the rest of the government on 9 August 2013. When he appointed a new government on 11 August, it did not include the post of Prime Minister; Boni apparently intended to personally coordinate the government's work.

Koupaki stood as a candidate in the March 2016 presidential election. He was unsuccessful in the first round of voting and backed Patrice Talon for the second round. Talon won the election, and when he took office on 6 April 2016, he appointed Koupaki as Minister of State and Secretary-General of the Presidency.

Political offices
Preceded by Adrien Houngbédji	Prime Minister of Benin; 2011–2013	Vacant Title next held by Lionel Zinsou
