= 2011 Beninese parliamentary election =

- 30 April 2011
- All 83 seats in the National Assembly; 42 seats needed for a majority
- Turnout: 57.63%
Party	Leader	Vote %	Seats
FCBE	Thomas Boni Yayi	33.30	41
Union Makes the Nation	Adrien Houngbédji	26.89	30
Cauris 2 Alliance		6.45	2
G13 Baobab Alliance		5.92	2
FE–UPR		4.99	2
UB		4.51	2
Amana Alliance		3.13	2
Strength in Unity		2.59	2
This lists parties that won seats. See the complete results below.

Parliamentary elections were held in Benin on 30 April 2011, after being delayed from 17 April 2011. Turnout was reportedly low. The election saw a six-seat increase for the Cauri Forces for an Emerging Benin, composed of allies of the president Yayi Boni, which took nearly half the parliamentary seats. The election consolidated Boni's victory in the 2011 presidential elections the previous month; Adrien Houngbédji, the second-placed candidate, had rejected the validity of the presidential election results.

== Campaign ==
Around 20 parties and 1,600 candidates contested the elections. The major opposition was formed by a new alliance of parties, Union Makes the Nation, whose leader Houngbédji had run for president in 2006 under the banner of the Democratic Renewal Party.

== Results ==
Party	Votes	%	Seats
Cowry Forces for an Emerging Benin	665,810	33.30	41
Union Makes the Nation	537,632	26.89	30
Cauris 2 Alliance	128,974	6.45	2
G13 Baobab Alliance	118,289	5.92	2
Hope Force–Union for Relief	99,698	4.99	2
Union for Benin	90,179	4.51	2
Amana Alliance	62,501	3.13	2
Strength in Unity Alliance	51,723	2.59	2
New Courage Alliance	40,684	2.03	0
New Force Alliance	37,434	1.87	0
Party for the Republican Union	32,393	1.62	0
Patriotic Revival Party	29,525	1.48	0
Common Action Front	24,685	1.23	0
Liberal Democrats' Rally for National Reconstruction – Vivoten	21,784	1.09	0
New Forces for Democracy and Development	14,572	0.73	0
Benin Movement–Fight Against Poverty	13,570	0.68	0
Sacred Union of Awakening for Development	12,886	0.64	0
Movement for Revival, Democracy and Development	10,374	0.52	0
Our Common Destiny	6,513	0.33	0
Total	1,999,226	100.00	83
Valid votes	1,999,226	95.57	
Invalid/blank votes	92,757	4.43	
Total votes	2,091,983	100.00	
Registered voters/turnout	3,629,837	57.63	
Source: Election Passport, African Elections Database
