= Cauris 2 Alliance =

The Cauris 2 Alliance (French: Alliance Cauris 2, AC2) is a political alliance in Benin led by Léon Bani Bio Bigou and Étienne Kossi. The alliance supports President Yayi Boni.

== History ==
In the April 2011 parliamentary elections the alliance finished in third place with 6.5% of the vote. However, it won just two seats, taken by Noudokpo Pascal Essou and Evariste Sinkpota.
