= Alliance for a Triumphant Benin =

The Alliance for a Triumphant Benin (French: Alliance pour un Bénin Triomphant, ABT) is a political alliance in Benin formerly led by Abdoulaye Bio Tchané.

== History ==
The alliance received 3.7% of the vote in the 2015 parliamentary elections, winning two seats. After changes in the election laws in 2018, most parties were effectively prevented from fielding candidates in future parliamentary elections. Abdoulaye Bio Tchané went on to become the head of the Republican Bloc.
