= Sun Alliance =

Sun Alliance may refer to:

- Sun Alliance (political alliance), a political alliance in Benin
- Sun Alliance (company), an insurance company that merged into the RSA Insurance Group
