= Nago (disambiguation) =

Nago is a city in Japan.

Nago may also refer to:

- Nago language, a dialect continuum of West Africa
- Nago-Torbole
- Nago, a cat-like character in the Kirby series who is most prominent in Kirby's Dream Land 3

== People with the surname ==
- Mathurin Nago, Beninese politician
- Shintaro Nago (名古 新太郎; born 1996), Japanese footballer
