= Marie-Elise Gbèdo =

Beninese politician (born 1954)

Marie-Elise Akouavi Gbèdo
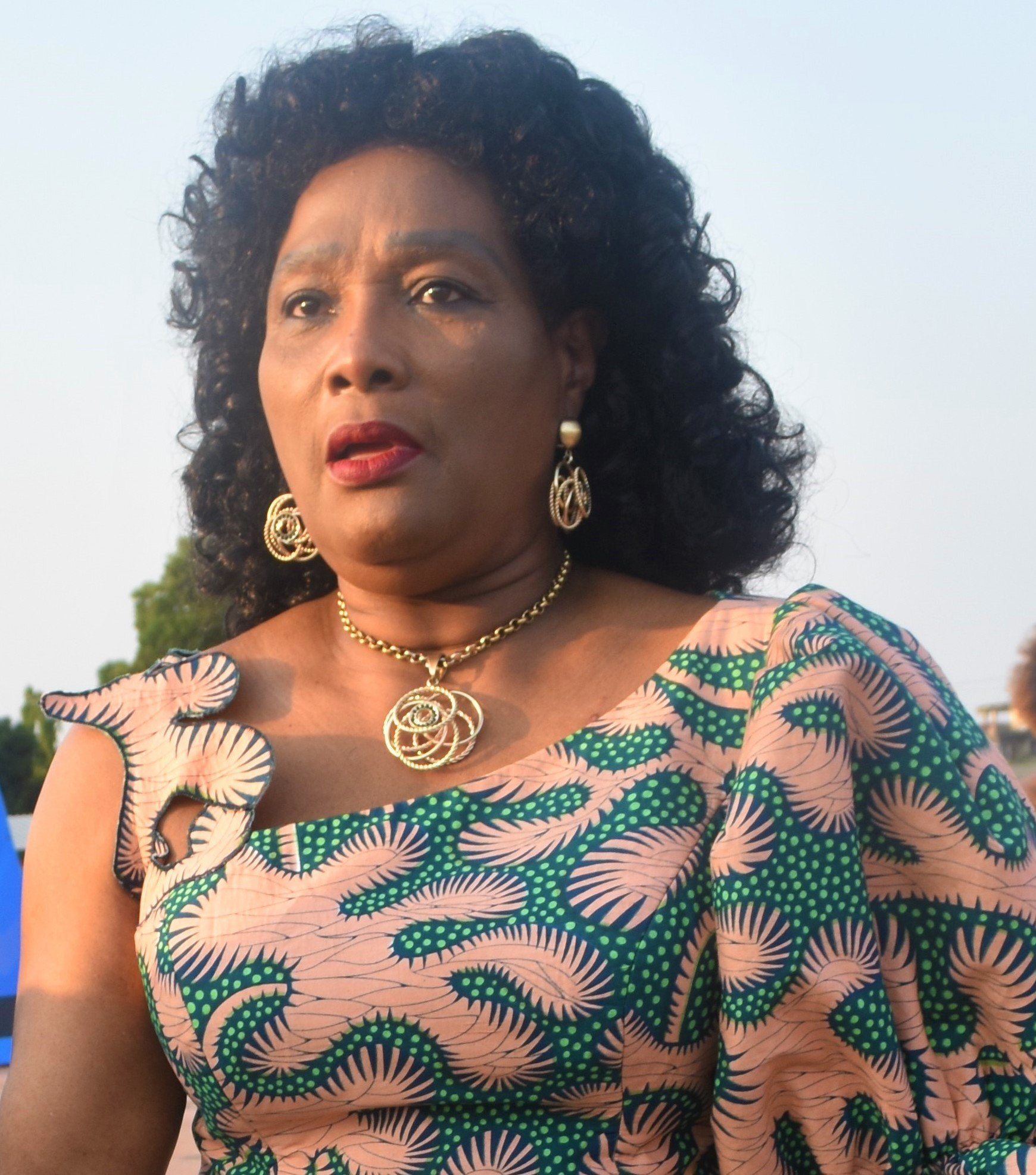

Minister of Justice of Benin
- In office 2012–2013

Minister of Commerce of Benin
- In office May 1998 – June 1999

Personal details
- Born: 29 December 1954 (age 71) Mankono, French West Africa
- Party: Independent
- Education: Sorbonne University
- Profession: Lawyer, writer

Marie-Elise Akouavi Gbèdo (born 29 December 1954) is a Beninese politician who has run for president four times. She served as Minister of Justice of Benin from 2012 to 2013.

== Biography ==
=== Early life and legal career ===
Marie-Elise Gbèdo was born on 29 December 1954 in Mankono, in today's Ivory Coast. She was educated in Benin at the primary and secondary level, then went to France to continue her studies at the Sorbonne University. She earned a license and a master's degree in law, and in 1983 she obtained a Master in Business Law. The certificate of fitness as a lawyer (CAPA) was granted to her the following year. She joined the Paris Bar in 1985 and worked for several law firms. In 1987, on her return to Benin, Gbedo became the fifth woman to be called to the bar in her country. The lawyer opened her own office two years later. She championed the rights of women and chaired the Association of Women Lawyers of Benin (AFJB). Gbedo encouraged women to pursue university studies and lamented the lack of female administrators in Benin.

In March 1998, she was shot five times after leaving her office by six gunmen. Her seven-year-old son was hit by a bullet as well. Four of the attackers were sentenced to 15 years of hard labor, with one being acquitted.

=== Political career ===
In May 1998 she was appointed Minister of Commerce, Crafts, and Tourism by President Mathieu Kérékou. She was dismissed from that position in June 1999 after attempting to resolve a scandal pertaining to a business deal between the nationalized petroleum company SONACOP and a private firm. Afterward, she became a vocal critic of the government, making her determined to end business as usual. She frequently appeared on national television and radio criticizing the Kerekou administration.

In February 2001, she announced her candidacy for the March 2001 presidential election, becoming the country's first female presidential candidate and the first in West Africa. In doing so, Gbèdo, a mother of two, faced some conservative attitudes. In particular, she received disapproval because she was divorced. Reportedly she received more disapproval from women than men, although she had the backing of some women's groups such as Dignite Feminine. Running as an independent, she adopted the slogan "Hwenusu" ( "The time has come" in the Fon language). She said and said it's time that women engage in politics and exercise power. Her candidacy also focused on the fight against corruption. In the election, she took 11th place with 0.36% of the vote.

In November 2005, she wrote the book "Le destin du roseau" (The Reed of Destiny), containing autobiographical interviews and essays on her vision of Benin's development and that of Africa in general. Running again in the March 2006 presidential election, Gbedo was followed by filmmaker Sanvi Panou, who created a documentary film called The Amazon candidate. Another woman, Celestine Zanou, was among the 26 candidates. Gbedo took 16th place with 0.33% of the vote.

She ran for president in the March 2011 presidential election. After Thomas Boni Yayi was declared victorious, she opted to back him despite opposition figures challenging the results. As a result, he named her Minister of Justice in 2012. Gbèdo served until 2013 and was replaced by a woman, Reckya Madougou. She unsuccessfully contested the March 2016 presidential election. Her platform was based on providing reliable electricity and combating youth unemployment.

== Awards ==
The title of Commander of the National Order of Benin was awarded to Marie-Elise Gbèdo in 2000. She is also a Knight of the National Order of the Legion of Honor.
