= Rally for Progress and Renewal =

Political party in Benin

The Rally for Progress and Renewal (French: Rassemblement pour le Progrès et le Renouveau, RPR) is a political party in Benin.

== History ==
The party was established in 1998, and contested the 1999 elections in an alliance with the National Union for Solidarity and Development. The two parties received 2.2% of the vote, winning a single seat, taken by the RPR's Valentin Aditi Houdé.

In May 2014 the party joined the National Alliance for Development and Democracy. The Alliance won four seats in the 2015 parliamentary elections.
