= Patriotic Revival Party =

Political party in Benin

The Patriotic Revival Party (French: Parti Réveil Patriotique, PRP) is a political party in Benin led by Janvier Yahouédéhou.

== History ==
Yahouédéhou was nominated as the party's candidate for the 2011 presidential elections. He finished sixth in a field of 14 candidates with 0.56% of the vote. In the parliamentary elections later in the year, the party received 1.5% of the vote, failing to win a seat.

The party contested the 2015 parliamentary elections in alliance with the Benin Rebirth Party. The two parties received 7% of the vote, winning seven seats and becoming the fourth-largest faction in the National Assembly.
