= Strength in Unity Alliance =

The Strength in Unity Alliance (French: Alliance Force dans l'Unité, AFU) is a political alliance in Benin led by André Okuonlola. The alliance supports President Yayi Boni.

== History ==
In the April 2011 parliamentary elections it received 2.6% of the vote, winning two seats. Samari Bani and Biaou Akambi Okounlola became the alliance's MPs.
