= Nassirou Bako Arifari =

Beninese politician and academic

Nassirou Bako Arifari (born 30 October 1962) is a Beninese politician and academic who served as Minister of Foreign Affairs of Benin from 2011 to 2015. He came from an academic background before entering politics.

== Early life and academic career ==
Arifari was born on 30 October 1962 in Karimama in the Alibori Department of northern Benin. Educated locally, he earned a baccalaureat in Kandi and served in the military. He earned a master's degree in history at the Université Nationale du Bénin in 1989. He obtained a Diploma of Advanced Studies in Social Sciences at the Aix-Marseille University in 1994. After further study in Germany, Arifari returned to Marseille and earned a PhD in Sociology and Social Anthropology in 1999.

He was a Senior Lecturer in the department of Sociology and Anthropology at the University of Abomey and associate lecturer at the University of Cologne in Germany. Arifari was Scientific Director of the Laboratory of Studies and Research on Social Dynamics and Local Development (LASDEL-Benin). He has written several studies including on decentralization and local authorities in rural Benin and Niger, anthropological analyses of corruption in West Africa and the democratization process in Africa.

== Political career ==
In the 2007 legislative election, he was elected as a Deputy to the National Assembly. He was reelected in 2011 on the Amana Alliance ticket, which he founded. In the Assembly, he was appointed National Coordinator of the G13 Baobab Alliance. He became an important deputy in the National Assembly and won acclaim as an orator. In 2011, he set up the first computerized permanent electoral list in Benin.

He became the Minister of Foreign Affairs on 28 May 2011. Arifari proposed a permanent African seat in the UN Security Council to pre-empt crises in September 2011. He also advocated stronger international help to fight piracy in the Gulf of Guinea. In 2012, he argued for the abolition of the death penalty. He visited Cuba in October 2014. On 12 January 2015, Arifari welcomed exiled former Central African Republic President Michel Djotodia at Cotonou Airport and said that Benin received Djotodia "at the request of member states of the Economic Community of Central African States" as a "contribution to the search for peace in central Africa." In a March 2015 speech to the United Nations, Arifari stressed the need for environmental sustainability in the cotton industry and emphasized a fast resolution in World Trade Organization negotiations.

On 22 June 2015, he was succeeded as Minister of Foreign Affairs by Saliou Akadiri. After leaving office, Arifari returned to his seat in the National Assembly, where he became President of the International Relations Committee. In January 2015, Arifari announced his candidacy for President on the Amana Alliance ticket in the March 2011 presidential election. The move was seen as an expression of dissent with the candidacy of Lionel Zinsou. In the election, Arifari received 19,061 votes, or 0.63 percent.

== Personal life ==
Arifari is married and has five children. He is a polyglot and can speak French, English, German, Arabic, Dendi, Haoussa, Fon, and Bariba.
