= Aholou =

Aholou is a surname. Notable people with the surname include:

- Hélène Aholou Keke, Beninese lawyer and politician
- Jean-Eudes Aholou (born 1994), Ivorian footballer
- Kouame Aholou (born 1970), Togolese sprinter
- Roger Aholou (born 1993), Ivorian footballer
