= Résoatao Party =

Political party in Benin

The Résoatao Party (French: Parti RésoAtao) is a political party in Benin.

== History ==
The party was founded by Mohamed Atao Hinnouho in February 2013. It received 2% of the vote in the 2015 parliamentary elections, winning a single seat, which was taken by Hinnouho.

Following a party primary, Hinnouho was chosen as the party's candidate for the 2016 presidential elections.
