= Joachim Dahissiho =

Beninese politician

Joachim Dahissiho is a Beninese politician, having run for the office of the Beninese presidency in 2011. He came in 14th, with 4,724 votes and 0.19% of the total votes.
