= Union for Benin =

- Founded: 21 March 2011
- National Assembly: 0 / 109

The Union for Benin (French: Union pour le Bénin, UB) is a political alliance in Benin led by Barnabé Dassigli. The alliance supports President Yayi Boni.

== History ==
The alliance was created on 21 March 2011, and consists of the Union for Labour and Democracy led by Dassigli, the Party for Development and Reform of Lucien Houngnibo, the Union for the Triumph of the Republic (Antoine Alabi Gbègan), the Union of Citizen Forces (Lucien Agbota) and the Movement for Development, Culture and Peace (Faustin Godovo). In the April 2011 parliamentary elections it received 4.5% of the vote, winning two seats. Houngnibo and Hounsa Justin Agbodjèté became the alliance's MPs.

In the 2015 parliamentary elections the alliance's vote share fell to 2.9%, although it retained both seats.
