= Amana Alliance =

The Amana Alliance (French: Alliance Amana, AA) is a political alliance in Benin led by Nassirou Bako Arifari and Zimé Kora Gounou. The alliance supports President Yayi Boni.

== History ==
In the April 2011 parliamentary elections the alliance received 3.3% of the vote, winning two seats, taken by Kora Gounou and Ayouba Sanni. The AA contested the 2015 parliamentary elections in alliance with the Cowry Forces for an Emerging Benin, with the two receiving 30% of the vote and winning 32 seats.
