= Union Makes the Nation =

Alliance of opposition political parties in Benin

Union Makes the Nation L'Union fait la Nation
- Leader: Adrien Houngbédji
- Chairman: Bruno Amoussou
- Founded: 2011
- Dissolved: 2018
- Preceded by: Alliance for a Democratic Dynamic
- Succeeded by: Progressive Union
- Ideology: Factions: Progressivism; Social democracy Democratic socialism
- Political position: Left-wing

Website
- http://www.lunionfaitlanation.org

Union Makes the Nation (French: L'Union fait la Nation, abbreviated UN or the Union) is an alliance of opposition political parties in Benin, West Africa. It is composed of the MADEP, PSD, RB, Key Force, MDS, UNDP, MARCHE, PDPS, and RDL VIVOTEN, and therefore represents an expansion of the Alliance for a Democratic Dynamic to embrace most of the significant Beninese parties opposed to the government of President Yayi Boni. The Union contested the 2011 presidential and parliamentary elections. Their presidential candidate, Adrien Houngbédji, was credited with 35.7% of the vote; he issued a statement rejecting the validity of the election results. In the parliamentary elections, the Union took 30 seats out of 83 to become by far the largest opposition party.
