= 2011 Beninese presidential election =

Re-election of Yayi Boni

- 13 March 2011
- Registered: 3,668,558
- Turnout: 84.82%
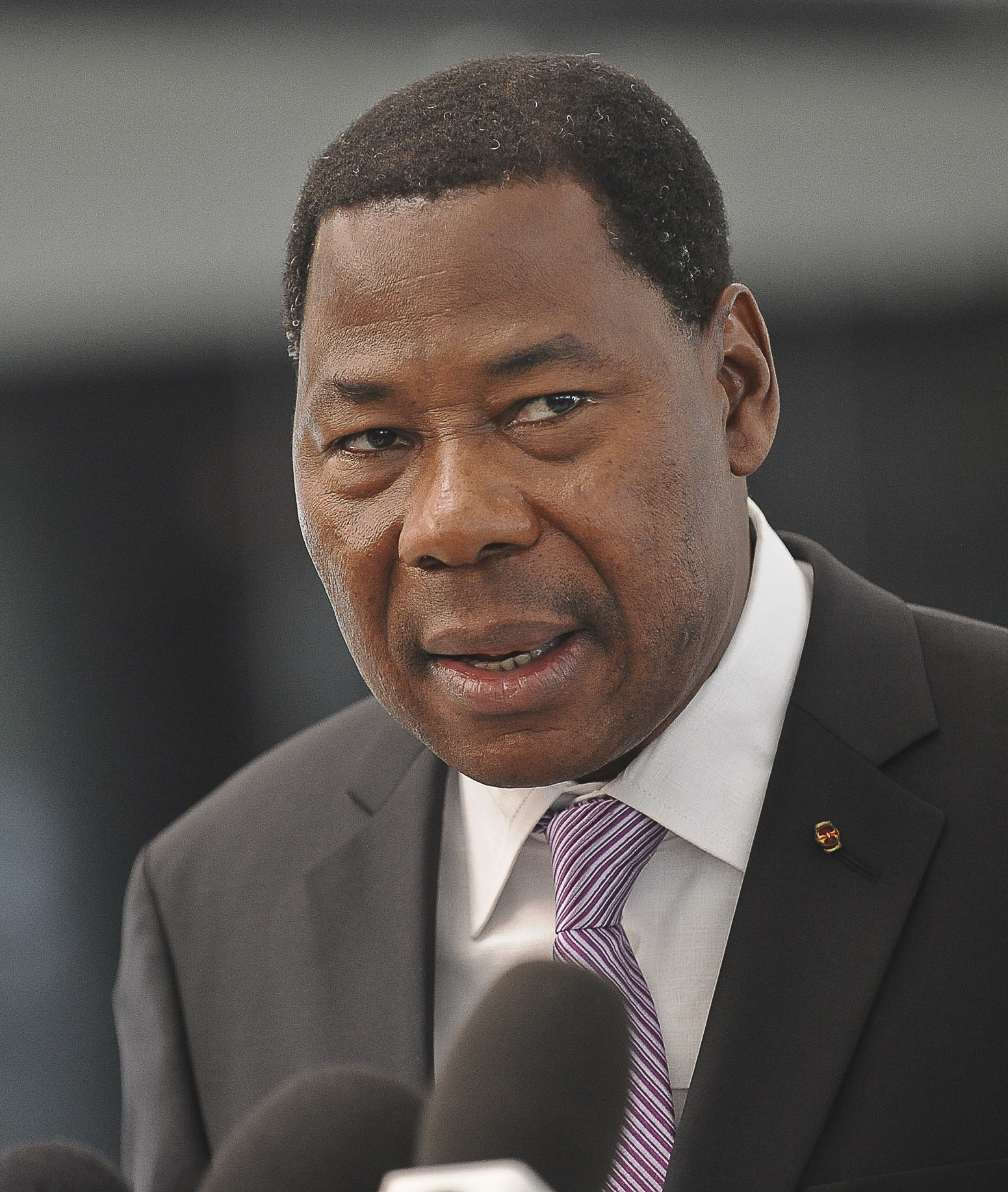

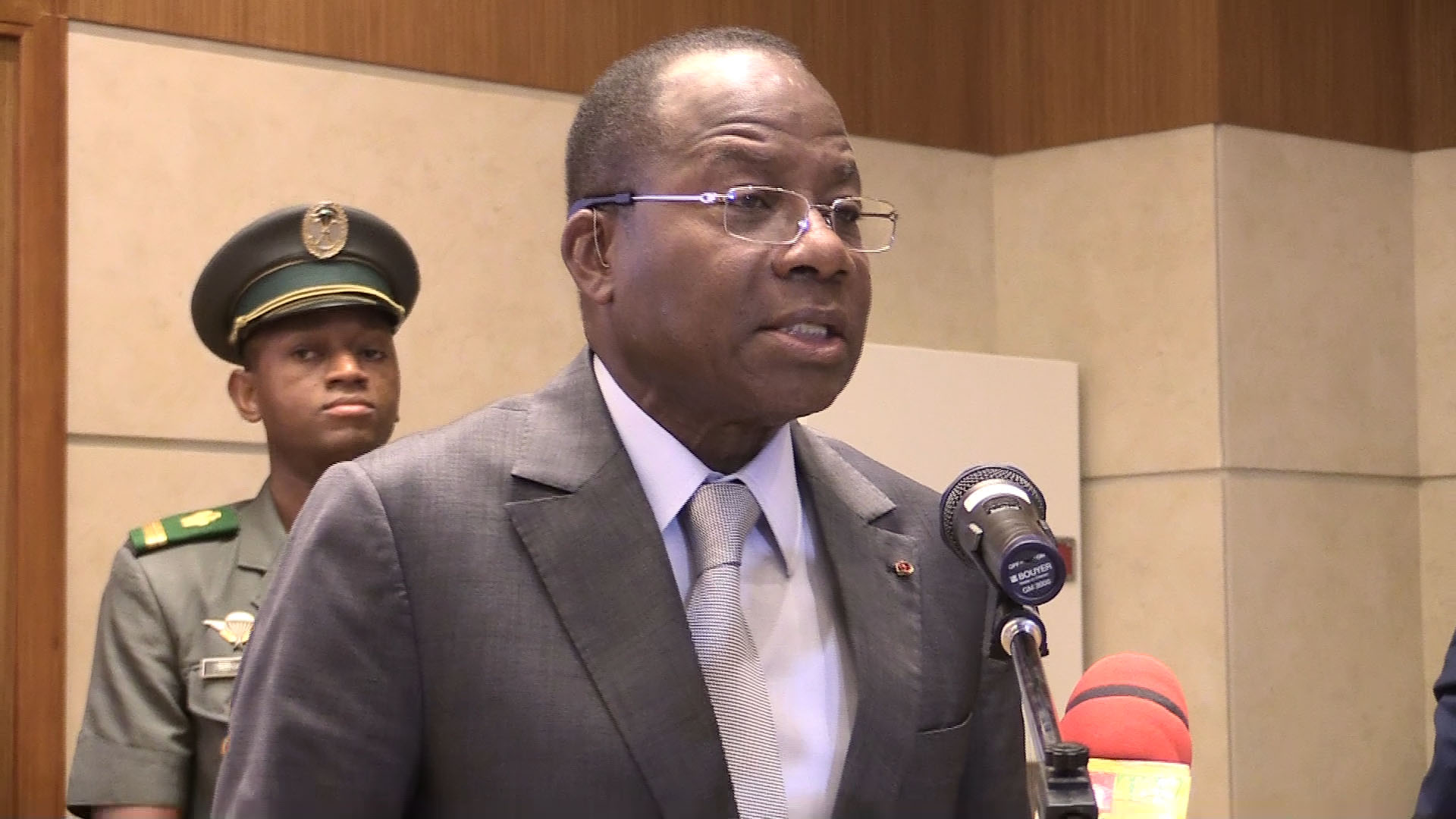
Nominee	Yayi Boni	Adrien Houngbédji
Party	Independent	PRD
Popular vote	1,579,550	1,059,396
Percentage	53.14%	35.64%
Results by department
Boni 50-60% 60-70% 70-80% 80-90%	Houngbédji 50-60% 70-80%
President before election
Yayi Boni
Independent
Elected President
Yayi Boni
Independent

Presidential elections were held in Benin on 13 March 2011 after being postponed twice from 27 February and 6 March 2011. Incumbent President Yayi Boni ran for re-election against thirteen other candidates, including former National Assembly head and political veteran Adrien Houngbédji and Abdoulaye Bio-Tchané, president of the West African Development Bank. He won 53.18% of the vote, enough to win a second term without a run-off. It is the first time since the restoration of democracy in Benin that a candidate has won the presidency in a single round. A second round run-off would have been held on 27 March 2011 if it had been necessary.

== Candidates ==
=== Adrien Houngbédji ===
Adrien Houngbédji, leader of the Democratic Renewal Party and runner-up to Boni in 2006, pledged to increase employment in the country's agriculture sector by investing 14 billion CFA francs ($28 million) in buying tractors and other heavy equipment for Beninese farmers. He also pledged to create an agricultural bank and lower the national income tax.

== Results ==
Candidate	Party	Votes	%
Yayi Boni	Independent	1,579,550	53.14
Adrien Houngbédji	Democratic Renewal Party	1,059,396	35.64
Abdoulaye Bio-Tchané	Independent	182,484	6.14
Salifou Issa	Union for Relief	37,219	1.25
Christian Enock Lagnidé	Independent	19,221	0.65
François Janvier Yahouédéhou	Patriotic Revival Party	16,591	0.56
Jean-Yves Sinzogan	Independent	13,561	0.46
Marie-Elise Gbèdo	Independent	12,017	0.40
Victor Prudent Topanou	Party for Republican Union	11,516	0.39
Késsilé Tchala Saré	Independent	9,469	0.32
Cyr Kouagou M'po	Independent	9,285	0.31
Antoine Dayori	Hope Force	8,426	0.28
Salomon Joseph Ahissou Biokou	Independent	7,893	0.27
Joachim Dahissiho	Independent	5,817	0.20
Total		2,972,445	100.00
Valid votes		2,972,445	95.52
Invalid/blank votes		139,388	4.48
Total votes		3,111,833	100.00
Registered voters/turnout		3,668,558	84.82
Source: African Elections Database

== Protests ==
A series of protests and rioting hit the nation after growing opposition amid street protests against the results and popular protests eventually persuaded throughout the country. Countrywide opposition protests were held amid shootings and strikes in Cotonou and other cities. 1 was killed in the clashes and protests eventually dwindled.
