= Lionel Zinsou =

French–Beninese investment banker and politician (born 1953)

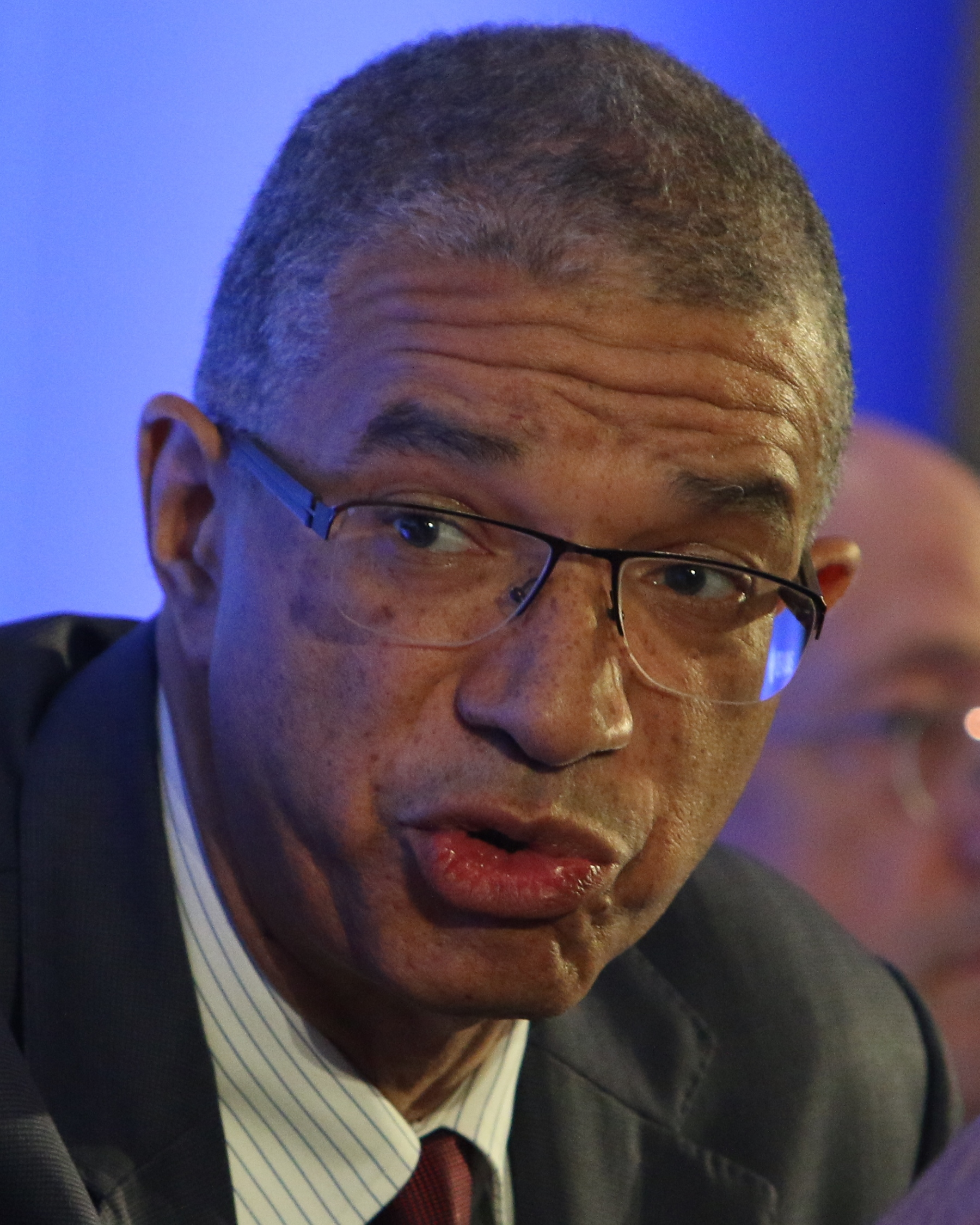
- Zinsou in 2017

Prime Minister of Benin
- In office 18 June 2015 – 6 April 2016
- President: Thomas Boni Yayi
- Preceded by: Pascal Koupaki (2013)
- Succeeded by: Position abolished

Personal details
- Born: 23 October 1953 (age 72) Paris, France
- Spouse: Marie Derlin Zinsou (?–2019; her death)
- Education: École Normale Supérieure; London School of Economics

Lionel Zinsou (born 23 October 1953) is a French–Beninese economist and investment banker who was Prime Minister of Benin from 2015 to 2016. Since June 2017, he has been the president of Terra Nova, a centre-left French think tank.

== Early life and education ==
Zinsou's father was born in Benin, then known as Dahomey. Zinsou himself, who was born in Paris, is a nephew of Émile Derlin Zinsou, who was President of Dahomey from 1968 to 1969.

Zinsou is a graduate of the École Normale Supérieure and the London School of Economics.

== Career ==
Zinsou developed a close association with the French socialist politician Laurent Fabius and worked under Fabius in the mid-1980s while the latter was in government.

Zinsou was a partner at bankers Rothschilds before joining the investment fund PAI Partners in 2008. He was also Special Adviser to the President of Benin, Yayi Boni, from 2006 to 2011.

In 2013, his Zinsou Foundation opened in Ouidah, Benin, the first museum of contemporary art in sub-Saharan Africa outside South Africa.

On 18 June 2015, President Yayi Boni appointed Zinsou as Prime Minister of Benin, along with a 27-member government, and assigned him responsibility for economic development. The post of Prime Minister does not exist in the 1990 constitution, and for most of Yayi Boni's presidency—and most of the period since the constitution came into effect—no one held the post. Zinsou's appointment came less than 10 months before the end of the President's second term, and as the latter is barred from seeking re-election, some viewed the appointment as possibly being a signal that Zinsou was his chosen successor.

Zinsou announced on 1 December 2015, that he would stand as the candidate of the Cowry Forces for an Emerging Benin in the 2016 presidential election. He said that he would focus on financing agriculture and helping informal workers obtain formal employment.

During a visit to Djougou in northwestern Benin, Zinsou's helicopter crashed at a stadium on 27 December 2015. He was not harmed.

In June 2017, Zinsou was appointed president of Terra Nova, a centre-left French think tank.

== Other activities ==
- Danone, Member of the Board of Directors
- Atos, Member of the Board of Directors (2010-2014)
- Chr. Hansen, Member of the Board of Directors (2009-2011)
- Kaufman & Broad S.A., Member of the Board of Directors (2009-2015)

Political offices
Vacant Title last held by Pascal Koupaki	Prime Minister of Benin; 2015–2016	Position abolished
