= Union for Democracy and National Solidarity =

Political party in Benin

The Union for Democracy and National Solidarity (French: Union pour la Démocratie et la Solidarité Nationale) is a political party in Benin.

The party's president, Sacca Lafia, was its candidate in the March 2001 presidential election, receiving 1.20% of the vote and fifth place. It was part of the Star Alliance which contested the 1999 and 2003 parliamentary elections. At the Beninese parliamentary election, 2003, the Star Alliance won three out of 83 seats.
