= West African Development Bank =

International Multilateral Development Bank

- Banque Ouest Africaine de Développement (French); Banco de Desenvolvimento do Oeste Africano (Portuguese)
- West African Development Bank headquarters, 2014

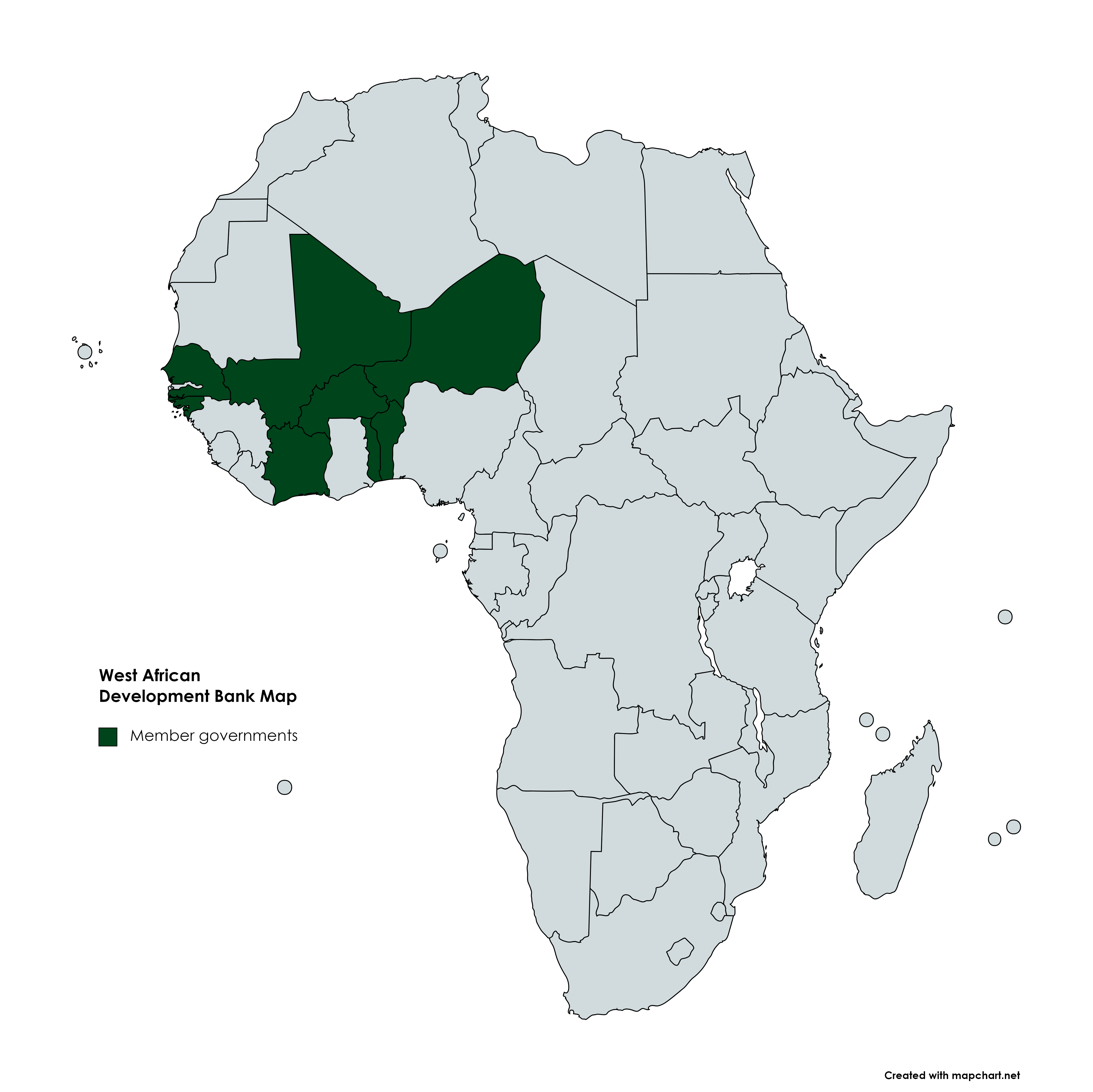
- West African Development Bank map
- Abbreviation: BOAD
- Formation: 14 November 1973
- Type: Development finance institution
- Legal status: Treaty
- Headquarters: Lomé, Togo
- Region served: West Africa
- Members: 8 countries
- Chairman of the Board of Directors and President of BOAD: Serge Ekue
- Affiliations: West African Monetary Union
- Staff: 291 (2013)
- Website: www.boad.org/en

The West African Development Bank - WADB (French: Banque Ouest Africaine de Développement - BOAD, Portuguese: Banco de Desenvolvimento do Oeste Africano - BDOA) was established in 1973 to serve the nations of Francophone and Lusophone West Africa. The BOAD is organised by the Central Bank of West African States and its eight member governments: Benin, Burkina Faso, Guinea Bissau, Côte d'Ivoire, Mali, Niger, Senegal, and Togo. It is funded by member states, foreign governments and international agencies. Its headquarters are in Lomé, Togo.

== Creation ==
The BOAD was created on 14 November 1973 by member states of the West African Monetary Union (WAMU). The original charter focused on development of member economies towards balanced development and to prepare economies for future West African economic integration. In 1994, it became the development arm of the West African Economic and Monetary Union (WAEMU/UEMOA).

== Structure ==
Since that time several international organisations have become members of the bank, adding funding and sitting on the board. These include the African Development Bank, the European Investment Bank, the Export and Import Bank of India (Exim Bank), and the People's Bank of China. The president of the bank's board is chosen by the heads of state of UEMOA, and since January 2008, Abdoulaye Bio-Tchane. The bank's day-to-day operations are carried out by the President and the Bank adminmanager, cabinet, directorships of departments based in Lome, and mission offices based in the member nations.

== Mission ==
The BOAD released a revised mission statement in 2001, refocusing their funding on three development goals: poverty reduction, economic integration and promotion of private sector activity. The bank disburses long- and medium-term loans, previously available only to BOAD member governments and public institutions, are since 2002 also offered to private businesses involved in development projects of regional importance as well as lines of credit to finance Micro-credit projects and small to medium private enterprises. The BOAD also funds debt-relief programs to member governments with the agreement that funds are instead diverted to health programmes particularly those dealing with HIV/AIDS, education and infrastructure improvements.

== Headquarters ==
The bank is headquartered in Lome, Togo, in a seven-story modernist building designed by the French architects Durand, Menard, and Thiebault in 1980.

=== Gallery ===
BOAD, Lomé, Togo, 1981

BOAD, Lomé, Togo, 1981
