= Abdoulaye Bio Tchané =

Beninese economist and politician

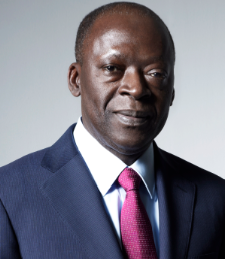
Abdoulaye Bio Tchané

Abdoulaye Bio Tchané (born November 1952) is a Beninese economist and politician.

== Early life and education ==
Born in Djougou, Bio Tchané earned a master's degree in economics from the University of Dijon and in banking from the Centre Ouest-Africain de Formation et d'Etudes Bancaires in Dakar.

== Career ==
Bio Tchané began his career at the Central Bank of West African States, rising to become director of the economic and monetary survey department. He served as Minister of Finance under Mathieu Kérékou from 1998 to 2002. Bio Tchané directed the African Department of the International Monetary Fund from 2002 to 2007, and he was president of the West African Development Bank from 2008 to 2010.

As a candidate in the 2011 presidential election, Bio Tchané was considered one of the favorites, but he ultimately placed a distant third. Five years later, he received 8.9 percent of the vote in the 2016 presidential election. In the second round of voting Bio Tchané backed Patrice Talon, and following Talon's victory Bio Tchané was appointed to the government as Minister of State for Planning and Development on 6 April 2016.

He is the only Muslim national leader in Benin.

== Other activities ==
- African Development Bank (AfDB), Ex-Officio Member of the Board of Governors (since 2016)
- Islamic Development Bank, Ex-Officio Member of the Board of Governors (since 2016)
- Multilateral Investment Guarantee Agency (MIGA), World Bank Group, Ex-Officio Member of the Board of Governors (since 2016)
- World Bank, Ex-Officio Member of the Board of Governors (since 2016)
