= Adrien Houngbédji =

Beninese politician

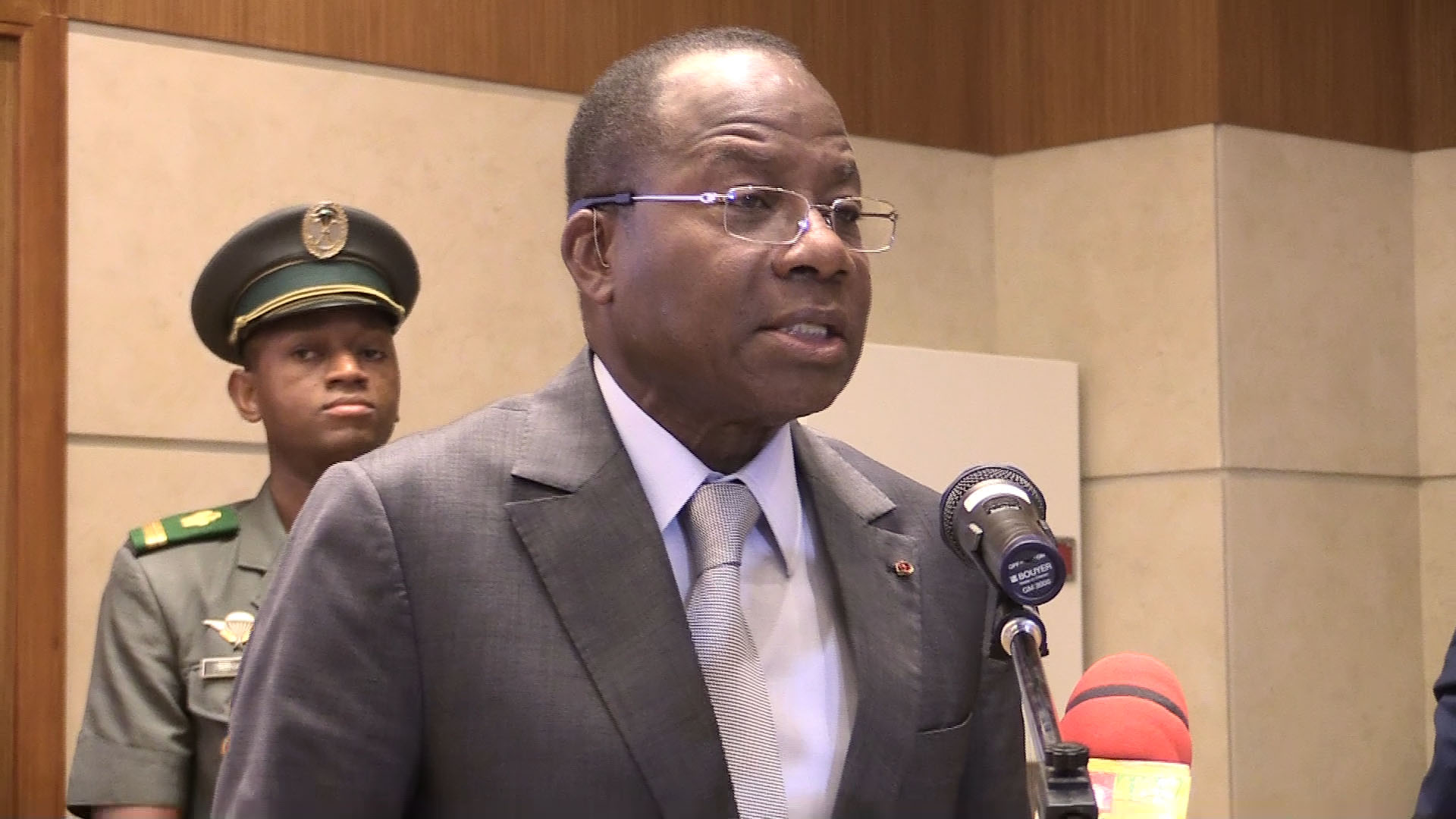
- Houngbédji in 2019

President of the National Assembly
- In office 20 May 2015 – 17 May 2019
- Preceded by: Mathurin Nago
- Succeeded by: Louis Vlavonou
- In office 20 April 1999 – 19 March 2003
- Preceded by: Bruno Amoussou
- Succeeded by: Antoine Idji Kolawolé
- In office 1 April 1991 – 31 March 1995
- Preceded by: Isidore de Souza
- Succeeded by: Bruno Amoussou

Prime Minister of Benin
- In office 9 April 1996 – 14 May 1998
- President: Mathieu Kérékou
- Preceded by: Nicéphore Soglo (1991)
- Succeeded by: Pascal Koupaki (2011)

Personal details
- Born: 5 March 1942 (age 84) Aplahoué, Benin
- Party: Democratic Renewal Party

Adrien Houngbédji (born 5 March 1942) is a Beninese politician and the leader of the Democratic Renewal Party (Parti du renouveau démocratique, PRD), one of Benin's main political parties. He was President of the National Assembly of Benin from 1991 to 1995, Prime Minister of Benin from 1996 to 1998, and President of the National Assembly again from 1999 to 2003. Beginning in 1991, he stood repeatedly as a presidential candidate; he placed second in 2006, but was heavily defeated by Yayi Boni in a second round of voting. From 2015 to 2019, he served for a third time as President of the National Assembly.

== Political career ==
Adrien Houngbédji was born in Aplahoué (Benin) in 1942. He earned a Doctorate in Law from the University of Paris in 1967 and graduated the same year from the French National School of Magistrate, first in his class. In August 1968 he joined the bar in Cotonou where he ran a prominent law office. After agreeing to represent an opponent of the regime of Mathieu Kérékou, he was arrested in February 1975. On March 5, 1975, Houngbédji escaped from prison and fled into exile; shortly afterward he was sentenced to death. He went to Paris, then to Dakar, Senegal, where he taught law, before going to Libreville, Gabon, where he again practiced law.

In Gabon he was close to President Omar Bongo, and Bongo encouraged Houngbédji to return to Benin in December 1989 after an amnesty was issued by the Kérékou regime, providing him with a plane and sending a Gabonese Minister of State to accompany him. Houngbédji participated in the February 1990 National Conference that led the country towards a multi-party democracy. He was favored by Kérékou to become prime minister at the National Conference, but Nicéphore Soglo found more favor with the delegates, and Houngbédji withdrew from the contest prior to the vote, in which Soglo was elected. Although considered by many to have been an ally of the Kérékou regime at the time of the National Conference, Houngbédji has written that he was actually an "enlightened adversary" of the regime. In March 1990 he founded the Democratic Renewal Party, and in early 1991 he was elected to the National Assembly of Benin. He ran in the March 1991 presidential election, taking fifth place with 4.54% of the vote. He was elected as President of the National Assembly in 1991, serving until 1995.

In the March 1995 parliamentary election, the PRD, along with other parties opposed to President Nicéphore Soglo, won a majority of seats in the National Assembly, and Houngbédji was re-elected to the Assembly. He took third place, with 19.71% of the vote, in the first round of the March 1996 presidential election, and he supported Kérékou in the second round of the election. Houngbédji was then appointed Prime Minister (a position which was recreated on this occasion) by Kérékou in April 1996, serving in that position for two years. On May 8, 1998, Houngbédji resigned, along with the three other PRD ministers in the government; the position of prime minister was eliminated in the next government, named on May 14.

Houngbédji and the PRD were part of the opposition in the March 1999 parliamentary election, and the opposition succeeded in winning a majority of seats; Houngbédji was re-elected to the National Assembly and was elected President of the National Assembly for a second time on April 29, defeating Kérékou's favored candidate Bruno Amoussou with 45 votes against Amoussou's 38 votes. He remained in the post until 2003. He was also elected co-president of the Africa Caribbean Pacific - European Union (ACP-EU) Joint Parliamentary Assembly in 2001.

In the March 2001 presidential election, he took third place and 12.62% of the vote; along with former President Soglo, who finished second, he refused to participate in a second round because of alleged fraud. Fourth-place candidate Bruno Amoussou therefore faced Kérékou in the second round, and Amoussou lost by a large margin.

On 13 February 2003, Houngbédji was elected as mayor of Benin's administrative capital, Porto-Novo, by the city's council; he took office on the same day. Houngbédji was re-elected to the National Assembly in the March 2003 parliamentary election, and in April 2003 he left the opposition to join the presidential majority. He resigned as Mayor of Porto-Novo in June 2003.

Houngbédji ran for president again in the March 2006 presidential election, and on this occasion an article in the constitution excluding Kérékou and Soglo from the race made Houngbédji a favorite. In the first round, held on March 5, he placed second, with about 24% of the vote according to official results, behind Yayi Boni with about 35%; therefore a run-off between Houngbédji and Boni was held on March 19. Houngbédji lost this round, with Yayi Boni receiving almost 75% of the vote.

Houngbédji was re-elected to the National Assembly in the March 2007 parliamentary election. He was again defeated by Yayi Boni in the March 2011 presidential election, although he disputed the official results, which showed Boni winning a first-round majority. At the PRD's Third Ordinary Congress, held in February 2012, Houngbédji was re-elected as President of the PRD.

In the April 2015 parliamentary election, Houngbédji was re-elected to the National Assembly as a PRD candidate in the 19th constituency. When the National Assembly began meeting for its new term, Houngbédji was elected as President of the National Assembly on the night of 19–20 May 2015; as the candidate representing the opposition, he received 42 votes, while the candidate representing Boni's supporters, Komi Koutché, received 41. He took office on 22 May, succeeding Mathurin Nago.

A member of the Académie des sciences d'outre-mer, Houngbédji published a book in October 2005 presenting his political vision of Benin and Africa titled Il n’y a de richesse que d’hommes (publisher: éditions l'Archipel).
