= Democratic Renewal Party (Benin) =

Political party in Benin

Democratic Renewal Party Parti du renouveau démocratique
- President: Adrien Houngbedji
- Founded: 24 September 1990
- Dissolved: 22 August 2022
- Merged into: Progressive Union for Renewal
- Ideology: Progressivism
- Political position: Centre-left

Website
- http://prdbenin.com

The Democratic Renewal Party (French: Parti du renouveau démocratique) was a political party of Benin led by Adrien Houngbédji. Houngbédji lived in exile for several years, but returned to Benin to take part in the National Conference of 1990. He built up his party largely around other exiled Beninese. PRD was legally recognized on September 24, 1990.

Houngbédji was elected to the National Assembly in the 1991 parliamentary election and served as President of the National Assembly until 1995.

In 1996, PRD joined the government, and Houngbédji was appointed prime minister. The coalition didn't last, however. Following the 1999 parliamentary election, Houngbédji was again elected as President of the National Assembly.

The PRD was mainly based in Ouémé. In the presidential election of 5 March 2006, Houngbédji, the PRD candidate, won 24.2% of the votes in the first round. In the second round he won 25.4% and was defeated by Yayi Boni.

== Parliamentary election results ==
- 1991 - 9 seats, in alliance with the National Party for Democracy and Development.
- 1995 - 18 seats
- 1999 - 11 seats
- 2003 - 11 seats
- 2007 - 10 seats
- 2011 - did not participate
- 2015 - 10 seats
