= Union for Relief =

Political party in Benin

The Union for Relief (Union pour la Relève (UPR)) is a political party of Benin. In the parliamentary election held on 31 March 2007, the party won three out of 83 seats.
