= Cowry Forces for an Emerging Benin =

Political party in Benin

Cowry Forces for an Emerging Benin Forces Cauris pour un Bénin émergent
- Chairman: Janvier Yahouédéou
- Secretary-General: Timothée Zannou
- Founded: 2003
- Ideology: Classical liberalism Social conservatism Populism
- Political position: Centre-right
- National Assembly of Benin: 0 / 109
- Municipal Councilors: 396 / 1,815

Website
- fcbe.bj (archived)

The Cowry Forces for an Emerging Benin (French: Forces Cauris pour un Bénin émergent, FCBE) is a political party of Benin, formed by supporters of former president Yayi Boni. In the parliamentary election held on 31 March 2007, the party won 35 out of 83 seats. The party expanded its plurality to 41 seats in the 2011 election that followed the contested reelection of Yayi Boni as president.

After President Boni Yayi had served maximum two five-year terms, Lionel Zinsou, the candidate for Cowry Forces for an Emerging Benin (FCBE), lost the March 2016 presidential election to Patrice Talon.

A controversial new electoral code introduced in July 2018 saw the party fail to be validated to run in the 2019 Beninese parliamentary election.

== Election results ==
=== Parliamentary elections ===
Year	Leader	Votes	%	Seats	+/-	Position	Outcome
2007	Thomas Boni Yayi			35 / 83	New	1st	Government
2011	Thomas Boni Yayi	665,810	33.30	41 / 83	▲6	1st	Government
2015 (Note: In coalition with Amana Alliance.)	Nassirou Bako Arifari	889,362	30.19	33 / 83	▼8	1st	Government
2019	Not allowed to participate						Extra-parliamentary
2023	Janvier Yahouédéou	109,598	4.42	0 / 109	▼33	▼4th	Extra-parliamentary
2026	Janvier Yahouédéou	133,263	4.78	0 / 109	0	4th	Extra-parliamentary

=== Municipal elections ===
Year	Votes	%	Councillors	+/-	Result
2020	372,818	15%	396 / 1,815	396	3rd
