= National Assembly (Benin) =

Unicameral legislature of Benin

National Assembly Assemblée nationale
- 9th National Assembly

Type
- Type: Lower house of the Beninese Parliament

History
- Founded: 1959

Leadership
- President: Joseph Djogbenou, UP-R since 8 February 2026

Structure
- Seats: 109
- Political groups: Government (109): Progressive Union Renewal (60); Republican Bloc (49)
- Length of term: 7 years

Elections
- Voting system: Party-list proportional representation with 10% electoral threshold
- Last election: 11 January 2026
- Next election: 11 January 2033

Meeting place
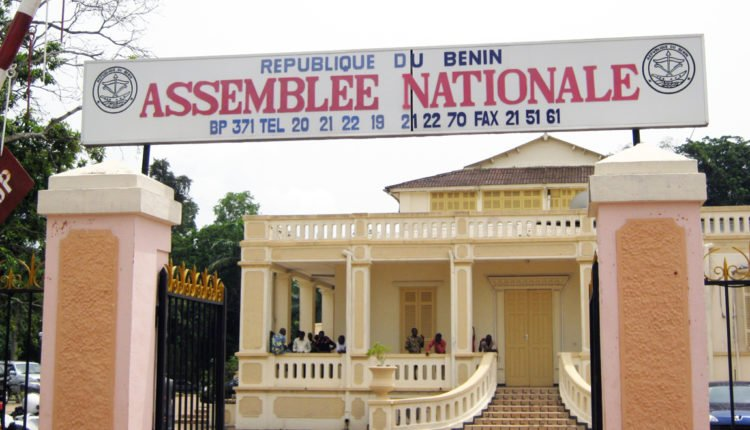
- Porto-Novo, Benin

Website
- https://assemblee-nationale.bj

The National Assembly (French: Assemblée nationale) is the lower house of the bicameral Beninese Parliament, the upper house being the Senate. The National Assembly in Porto-Novo as it exists today was formed in 1990. The current National Assembly has 109 members, who are directly elected through a system of party-list proportional representation and serve seven-year terms.

== History ==
The first parliament of an independent Benin was defined by the Constitution of 28 February 1959 and lasted from April 1959 to November 1960. It was chaired by Justin Ahomadegbé Tomètin. With a 1960 and a 1964 constitution, two new National Assemblies were enacted each time. The implementation of the Basic Law of 9 September 1977 radically altered the parliament. It was renamed the Revolutionary National Assembly (ANR) and lasted until February 1990. The High Council of the Republic was formed in February 1990 to democratize the country and was chaired by Archbishop Isidore de Souza. A new constitution was passed on 11 December 1990 which formed the basic structure of the current assembly. The term of the legislature was raised from five years to seven years in a series of constitutional changes in November 2025, which also changed the National Assembly from a unicameral legislature to the lower house of a bicameral legislature.

== Electoral system ==
The 109 members of the National Assembly are directly elected by the people in a party-list proportional representation system, with 24 multi-member constituencies that correspond to the departments of Benin. Parties select as many candidates as there are seats to be filled, and vacancies are filled by substitutes. They serve seven-year terms, and the most recent election was in 2026. To be eligible to vote in Benin, a person must be at least 18 years old, a Beninese citizen, fully possess civil and political rights, and not be convicted of a crime that merits a punishment of three months in prison, in contempt of court, or have an undischarged bankruptcy. Each candidate for the Assembly must be at least 25 years of age, a resident of Benin for at least a year, and a Beninese citizen by birth or a naturalized immigrant who has resided in the country for at least ten years. Being under guardianship disqualifies a person from running, as does being convicted of electoral fraud.

== Politics ==
In the 2015 election, Cauri Forces for an Emerging Benin retained 33 seats. They were the main party supporting President Thomas Boni Yayi. The two largest opposition parties were the Union Makes the Nation (UN) with 13 seats and the Party for Democratic Renewal (PRD) with 10. Six MPs are female, while 77 are male. Coalition building is essential. The main political issue facing the Assembly in recent years has been a proposal to amend the Constitution to allow Presidents to serve more than two terms, which has failed to receive enough support.

Adrien Houngbédji was elected as President of the National Assembly on the night of 19–20 May 2015; as the candidate representing the opposition, he received 42 votes. Members of Parliament receive a salary of 193,291 francs per month with an additional allowance of 373,003 francs per month. MPs must attend plenary sittings and committee meetings. MPs who miss one third of meetings may receive a hefty fine and be suspended for up to a year.

== See also ==
- History of Benin
- Legislative Branch
- List of legislatures by country
- List of presidents of the National Assembly of Benin
- Politics of Benin
