= Thomas Boni Yayi =

President of Benin from 2006 to 2016

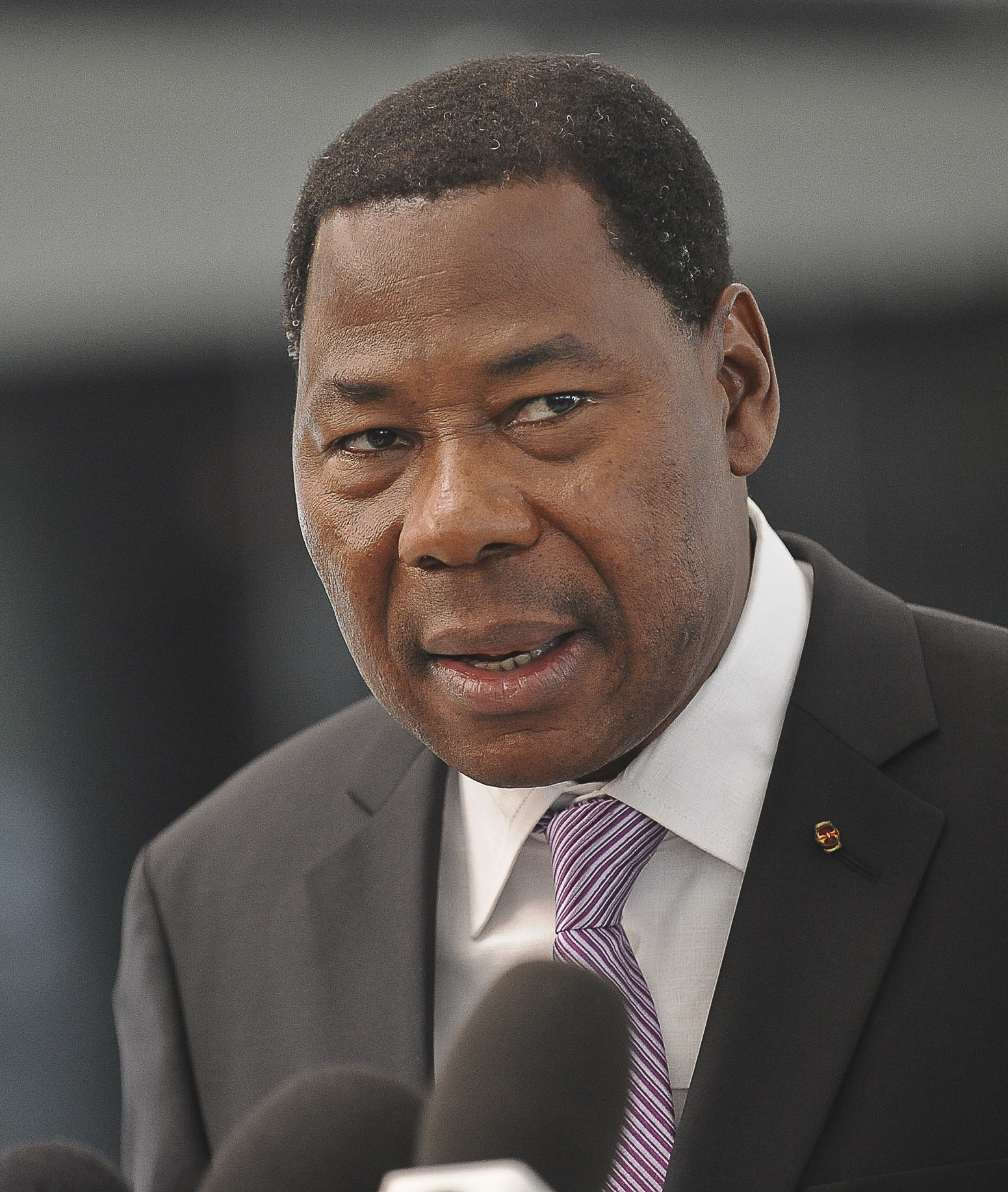
- Boni in 2012

7th President of Benin
- In office 6 April 2006 – 6 April 2016
- Prime Minister: Pascal Koupaki; Lionel Zinsou
- Preceded by: Mathieu Kérékou
- Succeeded by: Patrice Talon

10th Chairperson of the African Union
- In office 29 January 2012 – 27 January 2013
- Preceded by: Teodoro Obiang Nguema Mbasogo
- Succeeded by: Hailemariam Desalegn

President of The Democrats
- In office 15 October 2023 – 23 March 2026
- Preceded by: Eric Houndété
- Succeeded by: Nourérou Atchadé

Member of the Senate
- Incumbent
- Assumed office 30 July 2026
- Preceded by: Office created

Personal details
- Born: Thomas Yayi Boni; 1 July 1951 (age 75) Tchaourou, Dahomey (now Benin)
- Party: The Democrats (2020–present)
- Spouse: Chantal de Souza
- Children: 5
- Relatives: Marcel Alain de Souza (brother-in-law)
- Education: National University of Benin; Cheikh Anta Diop University; University of Orléans; Paris Dauphine University

Thomas Boni Yayi (born 1 July 1951) is a Beninese banker and politician who was the president of Benin from 2006 to 2016. He took office after winning the March 2006 presidential election and was re-elected to a second term in March 2011. He also served as the chairperson of the African Union from 29 January 2012 to 27 January 2013 and currently serves as a senator since 30 July 2026.

== Early life and banking career ==
Boni was born in Tchaourou, in the Borgou Department in northern Benin, then the French colony of Dahomey. He received his education first in the regional capital of Parakou before moving on to earn a master's degree in economics at the National University of Benin. He then pursued an additional master's degree in economics at the Cheikh Anta Diop University in Dakar, Senegal, and then earned a doctorate in economics and politics at the University of Orléans in France and at Paris Dauphine University, where he completed a doctorate in economics in 1976.

At the end of his education, Boni began a long career in banking. From 1975 until 1979 he worked at the Benin Commercial Bank before moving to work at the Central Bank of West African States (BCEAO) from 1977 until 1989. From 1992 until 1994, he served as an economic adviser to the President of Benin Nicéphore Soglo. In 1994 he left this position to become the President of the West African Development Bank (BOAD).

== Presidency ==
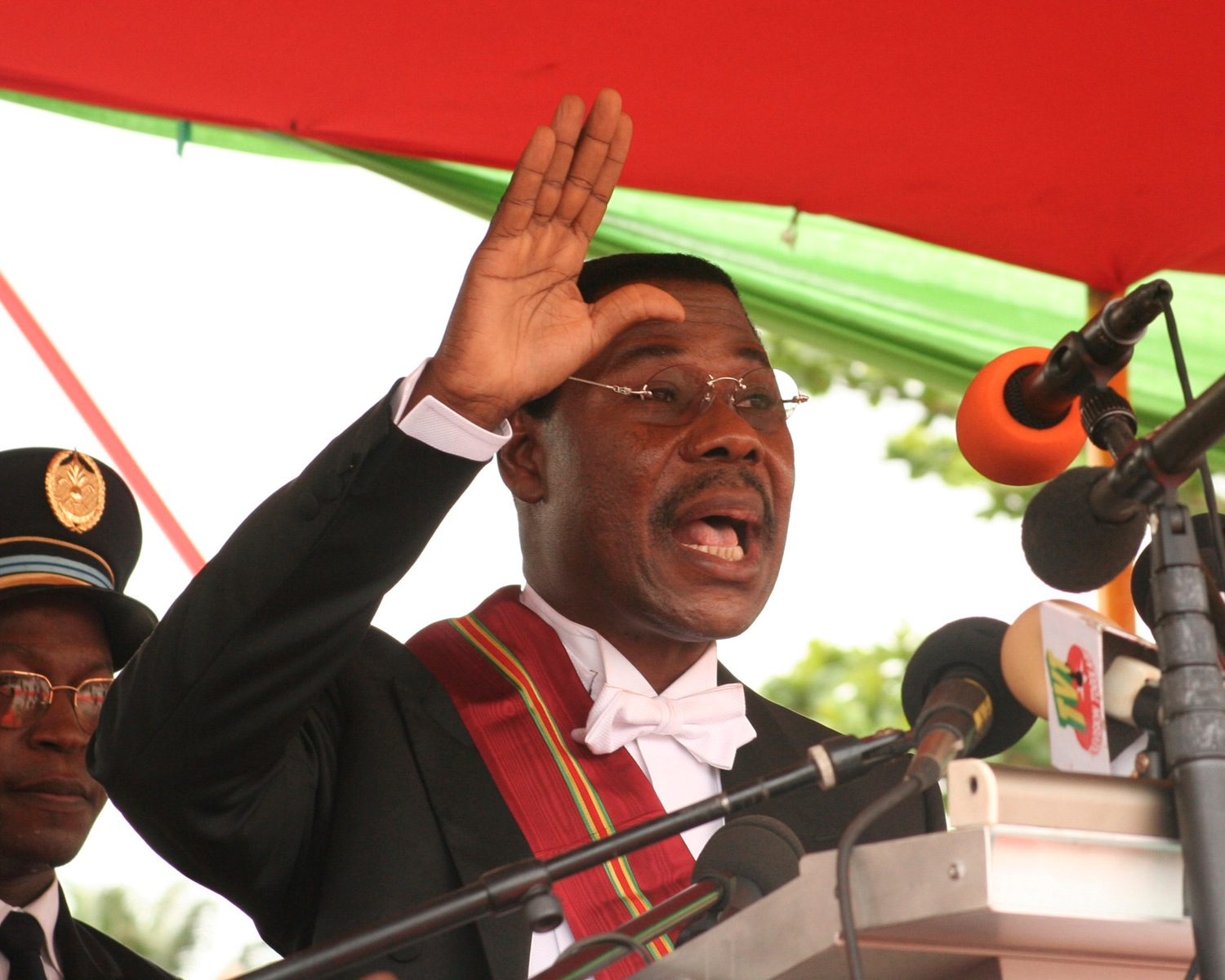
President Boni taking the oath of office, 2006

Boni stood as one of 26 candidates in the March 2006 presidential election. The sitting president, Mathieu Kérékou, had been a dominant force in the politics of the country since the early 1970s and there were serious doubts about him agreeing to allow a transition of power. Boni surprised many by earning 35.8% of the vote in the first round as an independent candidate. The main parts of his campaign were to improve governance, stimulate the private sector, improve educational opportunities for women and modernize the agricultural sector. His closest competitor was Adrien Houngbédji of Soglo's Party for Democratic Renewal who received 25 percent. In the runoff between Boni and Houngbédji on 19 March 2006, Boni won with almost 75% of the vote. He took office on 6 April 2006. The 2006 election saw high voter turnout and was considered free and fair by independent election observers.

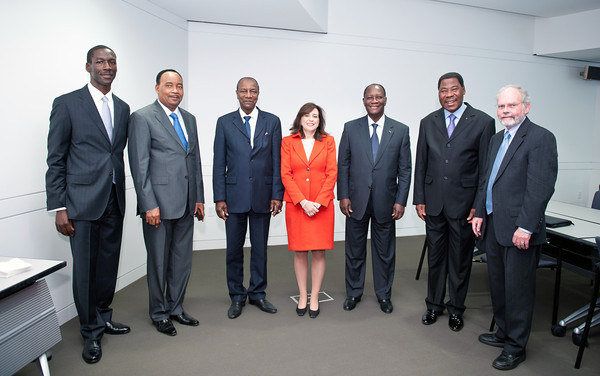
Raymond Gilpin, Mahamadou Issoufou, Alpha Conde, Tara Sonenshine, Alassane Ouattara, Boni Yayi, and David Smock in 2011

In the 2007 parliamentary elections, a coalition that was led by the Cowry Forces for an Emerging Benin (FCBE) and supported Boni earned the largest share of seats. This coalition broke apart by 2010 and prevented the passage of many parts of Boni's agenda. By August 2010, an increasingly unified coalition was able to get a majority of the parliament to vote to impeach Boni for his involvement in a Ponzi scheme that took the savings of 100,000 people in Benin. While they did not get the required two-thirds majority to remove Boni from power, the opposition agreed to organize around Houngbédji in the 2011 presidential election.

A new voter system in the country was widely criticized by the opposition, and with the assistance of international organizations, Boni agreed to a two-week delay in the 2011 presidential election. The result of the election, deemed free and fair by international election monitors, was a victory for Boni on the first round with 53.8% of the vote. Houngbédji, who received 36%, challenged the election and took the case to the Constitutional Court. The court named Boni as the winner on 21 March 2011, resulting in large-scale protests and police repression of those demonstrations. Although protests continued, the opposition had largely fractured and Boni's coalition earned 49 of the 83 seats in the parliamentary elections that followed. To date, Boni is the only person since the restoration of democracy to win the presidency in a single round.

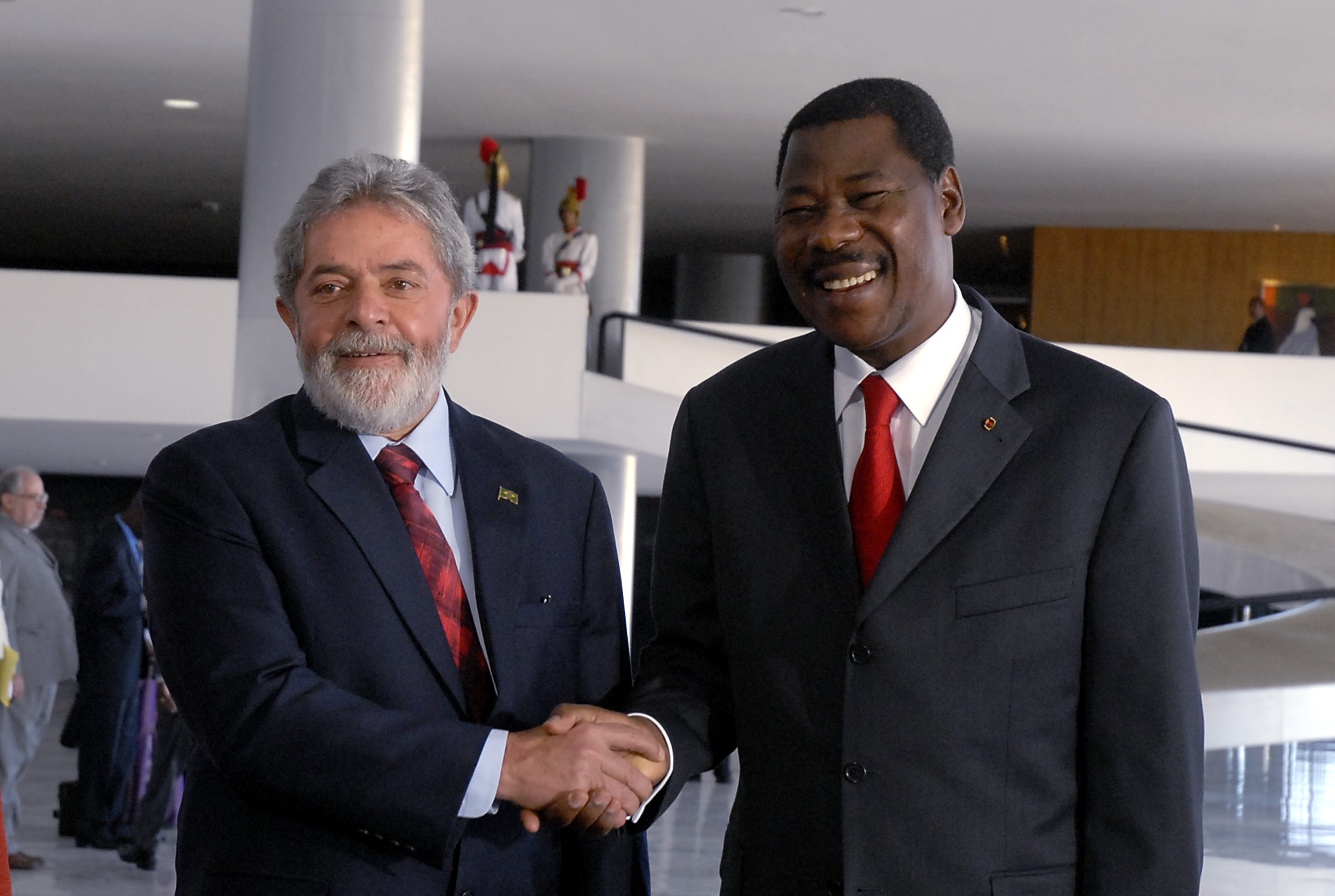
Boni Yayi with Brazilian president Luiz Inácio Lula da Silva, August 2007

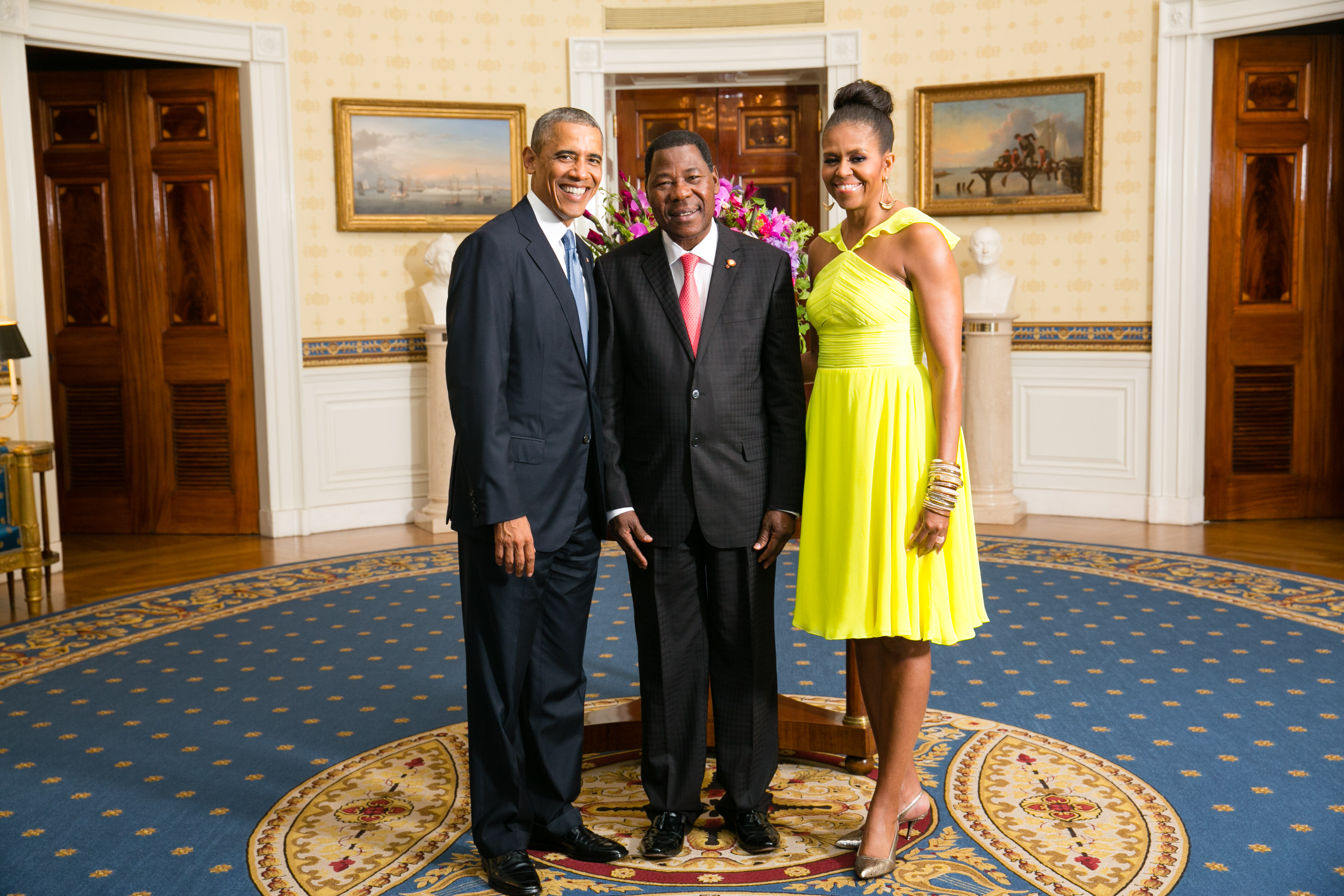
Barack and Michelle Obama greet Boni Yayi in the White House, August 2014

Having served two terms in office, Yayi Boni was constitutionally required to step down in 2016. His preferred successor, Prime Minister Lionel Zinsou, was defeated in the March 2016 presidential election by Patrice Talon, and Yayi Boni was succeeded by Talon on 6 April 2016.

Soon after leaving office, he headed the African Union's observer mission for the April 2016 presidential election in Equatorial Guinea.

In September 2021, Patrice Talon and Thomas Boni Yayi, political allies who have become intimate enemies, met at the Marina Palace in Cotonou. During this tête-à-tête, Thomas Boni Yayi presented Patrice Talon with a series of proposals and requests, relating in particular to the release of "political detainees".

=== Assassination attempts ===
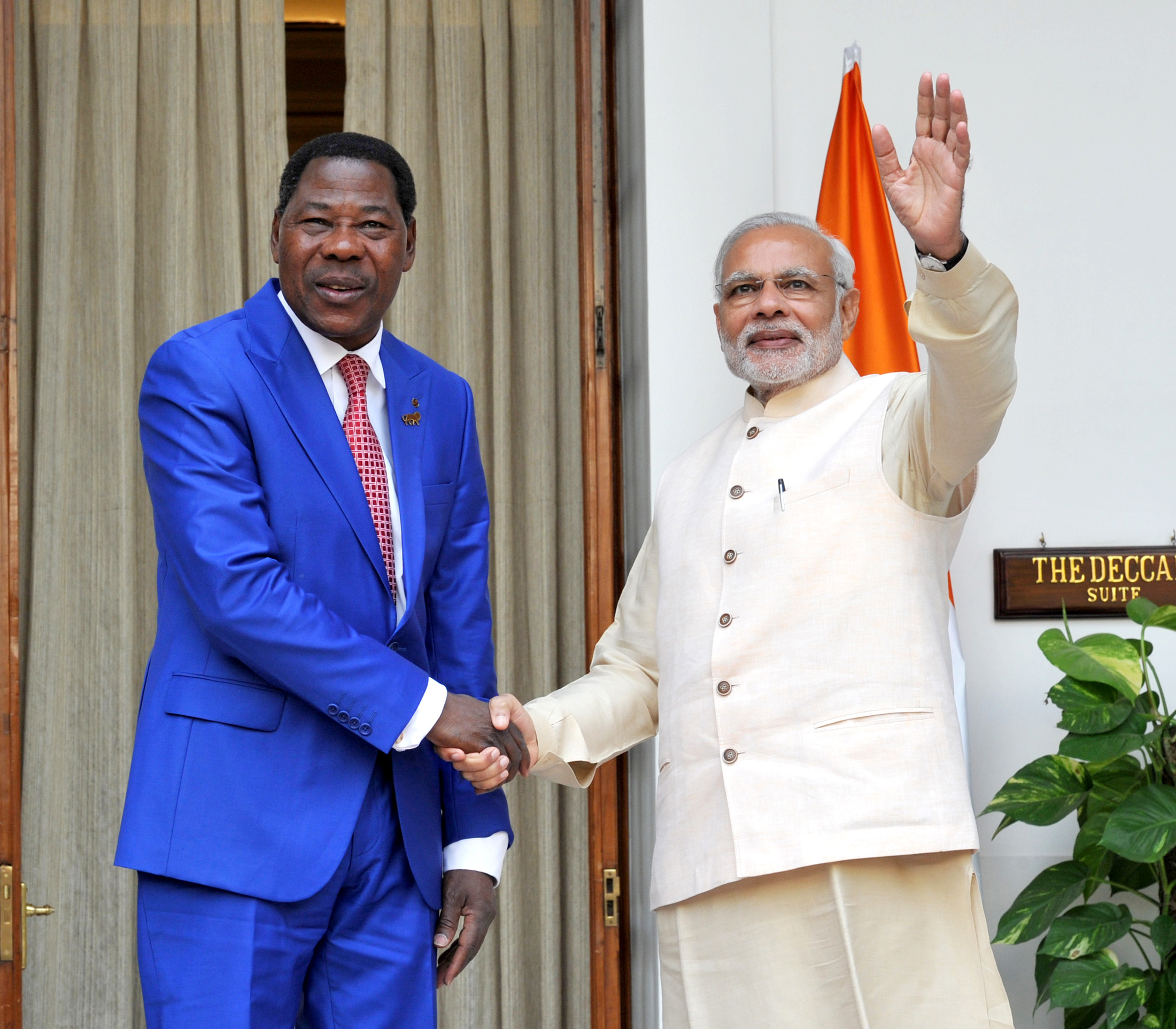
Narendra Modi meeting Boni Yayi in New Delhi, October 2015

On 15 March 2007, Yayi Boni survived an ambush on his convoy near the village of Ikemon while returning from an election campaign rally in the town Ouesse for the upcoming parliamentary elections. The attackers blocked the road with downed trees, and fired upon the vehicle that usually carries the President; however President Boni was traveling in a separate vehicle. Several of his entourage were wounded in the ensuing crossfire between the presidential guard and the would-be assassins. However this information remains unproven since all sources claiming the assassination attempt come from the president's camp. The verification of such information remains impossible to date.

On 23 October 2012, the BBC reported that the president's doctor, niece, and former commerce minister had been arrested in a plot to poison the president. Patrice Talon, a former ally of the president and businessman, had reportedly paid the niece to substitute the President's medicine with a "toxic substance" while he was on a state visit to Brussels.

=== Events of 2013 ===
In 2013, Benin authorities claimed to have foiled a coup. In February, Colonel Pamphile Zomahoun and businessman Johannes Dagnon blocked Yayi while returning from a trip from an African Union meeting at Equatorial Guinea. They were detained immediately.

While some argue that Yayi's government was being targeted because of its fight against corruption, others argue that he used the criminal justice system to silence opposition and media.

== Post-presidency ==
In 2026, Yayi resigned as leader of the Les Démocrates party, citing health reasons. He was succeeded by Nourérou Atchadé on 23 March 2026. Yayi decided to take his in the Senate in July 2026 despite previously rejecting the institution established through the December 2025 constitutional reform. He said that serving in the Senate would provide an important forum for political consultation, constructive dialogue, and representing citizens’ interests in a legislature dominated by a single political party.

== Personal life ==
Originally from a Muslim family, Boni Yayi is now an Evangelical Protestant. He has five children, and his wife Chantal (née de Souza), a native of the coastal city of Ouidah, is the niece of President Paul-Émile de Souza and Archbishop Isidore de Souza, and the great-granddaughter of Francisco Félix de Sousa, also known as Chacha de Souza, who was a Brazilian slave trader and the viceroy of Ouidah. Boni Yayi was introduced to his later wife by her older brother Marcel Alain de Souza. A descendant of the Yoruba princes of Sabe in his own right, both Boni Yayi and his wife were awarded chieftaincy titles by the Nigerian king of Ile-Ife, Olubuse II, in 2008.

== Honours ==
- Benin:
  - Grand Master and Grand Cross of the National Order of Benin - (2006)
  - Commander of the National Order of Benin
- Burkina Faso:
  - Grand Cross of the Ordre de l'Étalon, formerly National Order of Burkina Faso
- Ivory Coast:
  - Grand Cross of the National Order of the Ivory Coast

Political offices
Preceded by Mathieu Kérékou	President of Benin; 2006–2016	Succeeded by Patrice Talon
Diplomatic posts
Preceded by Teodoro Obiang Nguema Mbasogo	Chairperson of the African Union; 2012–13	Succeeded by Hailemariam Desalegn
