= Elections in Benin =

Elections in Benin take place within the framework of a multi-party democracy and a presidential system. Both the President and the National Assembly are directly elected by voters, with elections organised by the Autonomous National Electoral Commission (CENA).

== Electoral history ==
In 1926 three elected seats were created on the Administrative Council. Elections with a severely limited franchise were held in 1925, 1928, 1932, 1934 and 1936.

Following World War II, the territory began to elect members to the French National Assembly. The first of these elections took place on 21 October 1945, with Dahomey and neighbouring Togo combined into a single constituency. Two MPs were elected using separate electoral colleges for French citizens and Africans. A by-election was held in February 1946 after one of the two elected MPs died in December 1945, with a second full election for the combined constituency held in June 1946. By the November 1946 elections, Dahomey had become a single-member seat.

A General Council was established in the same period and was first elected in January 1947. The result was a victory for the Dahomeyan Progressive Union, which won 20 of the 30 elected seats. French National Assembly elections were held again in 1951, with Dahomey now having two seats; the Liste de l'Union Française and the Ethnic Group of the North (GEN) each won one seat. The General Council was converted into the Territorial Assembly in 1952, with the first elections to the new body resulting in a victory for the Republican Party of Dahomey (PRD), which won 19 of the 32 seats elected by the second college.

The final French National Assembly election in Dahomey was held in 1956, with the PRD and GEN each winning a seat. The Republican Party went on to win the 1957 Territorial Assembly elections. It also won the 1959 elections, despite receiving fewer votes than the Dahomeyan Democratic Union (UDD), which emerged as the smallest of the three parties in the legislature. Following claims of fraud, the PRD gave nine seats to the UDD, although it remained the largest party.

Following independence on 1 August 1960, parliamentary elections were held in December. The newly established Dahomeyan Unity Party won all 60 seats following changes to the electoral system by President Hubert Maga. The country subsequently became a one-party state, and the Dahomeyan Democratic Party was the only party to contest the elections in 1964, winning all 42 seats.

Following a military coup, attempts were made to reintroduce democracy; presidential elections were held in May 1968, but the results were invalidated due to insufficient voter turnout. The military government subsequently appointed Émile Derlin Zinsou as president, but he took the post on the condition that he was approved by voters. A subsequent vote on his candidacy was approved by just over three-quarters of voters. Another military coup led to presidential elections in 1970. Although they were won by Justin Ahomadégbé-Tomêtin, this was due to the results in Atakora being annulled, denying Hubert Maga victory. In order to prevent a civil war, Ahomadégbé-Tomêtin, Maga and the other main candidate Sourou-Migan Apithy agreed to form a three-member presidential council. However, this lasted only until another coup in 1972.

The country subsequently reverted to being a one-party state with the People's Revolutionary Party of Benin as the sole legal party. A National Revolutionary Assembly was established in 1977, and one-party elections were held in 1979, 1984 and 1989, before multi-party democracy was reintroduced at the start of the 1990s. Parliamentary elections held in February 1991 saw 12 parties and alliances win seats in the National Assembly, with the Union for the Triumph of Democratic Renewal (UTRD) emerging as the largest group with just 12 of the 64 seats. UTRD candidate Nicéphore Soglo subsequently won the presidential elections in March, beating incumbent Mathieu Kérékou in a runoff.

Parliamentary elections in 1995 saw 18 groups win seats in the enlarged 83-seat National Assembly; the Benin Rebirth Party became the largest party with 21 seats. The following year Soglo lost the presidential elections to Kérékou, who ran as an independent. Although Soglo received the most votes in the first round, Kérékou won 52% of the vote in the second. The 1999 parliamentary elections resulted in 16 groups winning seats; the Benin Rebirth Party remained the largest party with 27 seats.

In 2001 Kérékou was re-elected president, running as the Action Front for Renewal and Development (FARD) candidate. However, the election was marred by the withdrawal of Soglo from the run-off after he alleged fraud. With third-place Adrien Houngbédji also refusing to participate, Kérékou faced Bruno Amoussou in the second round, winning with 84% of the vote. The 2003 parliamentary elections saw the majority of parties contest under the Presidential Movement or Opposition banner, with the pro-Kérékou Presidential Movement (dominated by the FARD-based Union for Future Benin) winning a majority of seats.

The 2006 presidential election saw both Kérékou and Soglo barred from running by term limits and age. Yayi Boni defeated Houngbédji in the run-off, receiving 75% of the vote. Parliamentary elections the following year saw the pro-Boni Cowry Forces for an Emerging Benin (FCBE) emerge as the largest faction, with 35 of the 83 seats. Boni was re-elected in March 2011 with 53% of the vote, the first time a presidential candidate had won in the first round of voting since the run-off was introduced. In the parliamentary elections the following month the FCBE won 41 seats, narrowly missing out on obtaining a parliamentary majority. Parliamentary elections in 2015 saw the FCBE–Amana Alliance coalition emerge as the largest faction in the National Assembly with 33 seats. The 2016 presidential elections saw the FCBE candidate Lionel Zinsou receive the most votes in the first round, but then defeated in the second round by independent candidate Patrice Talon.

== Electoral system ==
=== President ===
The President of Benin is elected using the two-round system. As of 2026, the nomination fee for a candidate is the equivalent of about £328,000 (about 250 million West African CFA francs).

=== National Assembly ===
During the one-party state era, elections to the National Revolutionary Assembly were conducted in the form of a referendum. Voters were presented with a single list of the ruling People's Revolutionary Party of Benin's candidates to vote for or against. Term length was originally three years, but was extended to five years in the early 1980s. The number of seats varied; starting with 336 in 1979, reduced to 196 in 1984 and increased to 206 in 1989.

Currently the 109 seats in the National Assembly are elected by proportional representation in 24 multi-member constituencies. There are two constituencies for each of the country's 12 departments.

Voters must be at Beninese citizens aged 18 or over. However, people can be disqualified from voting if they are in contempt of court, have an undischarged bankruptcy or are imprisoned for at least three months for certain offences. Candidates must be at least 25 years old and have been resident in Benin for at least a year before the election. If not holding Beninese citizenship by birth, they must have lived in the country for at least 10 years. Government ministers, people working for businesses subsidised by state funds, people holding non-elected public office, involved in the military or working for foreign government or international organisations are not allowed to contest to stand as candidates.

== Referendums ==
During the colonial era, voters participated in French constitutional referendums in 1945, May 1946 and October 1946. The 1958 referendum on the new constitution of the French Fifth Republic was effectively an independence referendum, as if the terms of the constitution were rejected, the country would become an independent state. However, it was approved by 98% of voters, and Guinea was the only territory to reject the referendum.

Following independence in 1960, a constitutional referendum was held in 1964, with the proposed changes to the constitution creating a presidential system of government, scrapping term limits for the president, and having a unicameral parliament. It was approved by 99.8% of voters. Another constitutional referendum was held in 1968, with 92% voting in favour.

The most recent constitutional referendum was held in 1990. The main changes were a proposed return to multi-party democracy, with a secondary question for those voting in favour of the change, as to whether the president should be subject to term limits; 93% voted in favour of the proposed changes, with 73% of all voters in favour of term limits.
