= List of political parties in Benin =

This article lists political parties in Benin. Benin has a multi-party system.

== The parties ==
=== Parliamentary parties ===
Elected in the 2026 parliamentary election.

| Name | Abbreviation | Ideology | Political position | MPs |
|---|---|---|---|---|
| Progressive Union Renewal; Union progressiste le renouveau | UP-R | Social democracy; Pro-Talon | Centre-left | 60 / 109 |
| Republican Bloc; Bloc républicain | BR | Social liberalism; Pro-Talon | Centre | 49 / 109 |

==== Other parties ====
- The Democrats (Les Démocrates)
- Cowry Forces for an Emerging Benin (Forces Cauris pour un Bénin émergent)
- Democratic Union for a New Benin (Union Démocratique pour un Bénin Nouveau)
- Movement of Committed Elites for the Emancipation of Benin (Mouvement des Élites Engagées pour l’Émancipation du Bénin)
- Cowry Force for the Development of Benin (Force Cauri pour le Développement du Bénin)
- Unitary Dynamic for Democracy and Development (Dynamique Unitaire pour la Démocratie et le Développement)
- Renewed Flame Party (Parti la Flamme Renouvellée)
- Great Renewed Solidarity (Grande Solidarité Renouvelée)
- Party for Engagement and Relief (Parti pour l’Engagement et la Relève)
- Popular Liberation Movement (Mouvement Populaire de Libération)
- Restore the Hope (Restaurer l’Espoir)
- New National Force (Nouvelle Force Nationale)
- Restoring Trust (Restaurer La Confiance)
- Le Bénin en Marche
- Communist Party of Benin (Parti Communiste du Bénin)

==== Defunct parties ====
- African Congress for Renewal (DUNYA)
- Alliance for Democracy and Progress (ADP)
- National Union for Solidarity and Progress (UNSP)
- Key Force (Force clé)
- Democratic Renewal Party (Parti du renouveau démocratique)
- New Alliance (Nouvelle Alliance)
- Action Front for Renewal and Development (Front d'action pour le rénouveau et le développement, FARD-ALAFIA)
- Impulse to Progress and Democracy (Impulsion au progrès et la démocratie)
- Movement for Development by Culture (Mouvement pour le Développement par la Culture)
- Party of Salvation (Parti du Salut)
- Congress of People for Progress (Congrès du Peuple pour le Progrès)
- Alliance of Progress Forces (Alliance des Forces du Progrès)
- Rally for Democracy and Progress (Rassemblement pour la Démocratie et le Progrès)
- African Movement for Development and Progress (Mouvement africain pour la dévelloppement et le progrès)
- Social Democratic Party (Parti Social-Démocrate)
- Benin Rebirth Party (Parti de la renaissance du Bénin)
- Movement for Development and Solidarity (Mouvement pour le Développement et la Solidarité)
- National Union for Democracy and Progress (Union Nationale pour la Démocratie et le Progrès)
- Party for Democracy and Social Progress (Parti pour la Démocratie et le Progrès Social)
- Liberal Democrats' Rally for National Reconstruction-Vivoten (Rassemblement des Démocrates Libéraux pour la Reconstruction nationale)
- Builders and Managers of Freedom and Democracy (Bâtisseurs et Gestionnaires de la Liberté et de la Démocratie)
- The Greens (Les Verts)
- Union for Democracy and National Solidarity (Union pour la Démocratie et la Solidarité Nationale)
- Rally for Progress and Renewal (Rassemblement pour le Progrès et le Renouveau)
- Hope Force (Force Espoir)
- Union for Progress and Democracy (UPD)
- Impulse for a New Vision of the Republic
- Party for Progress and Democracy (PPD)
- Party for Democracy and Solidarity (PDS)
- Résoatao Party (Parti RésoAtao)
- African Movement for Democracy and Progress (MADEP)
- Alliance of the Social Democratic Party (PSD)
- Cameleon Alliance (AC)
- Coalition of Democratic Forces (CFD)
- Movement for Citizens' Commitment and Awakening (MERCI)
- Movement for the People's Alternative (Mouvement pour une Alternative du Peuple)
- Movement for Solidary Prosperity (MPS)
- New Generation for the Republic (NGR)
- Our Common Cause (NCC)
- Parti Démocratique du Bénin (PDB)
- Rally for Democracy and Pan-Africanism (RDP)
- Union for Homeland and Labour (UPT)
- Union for National Democracy and Solidarity (UDS)
- Coalition for an Emerging Benin (Coalition pour un Bénin Emergent)
- Alliance for Revival (Alliance Le Réveil)

== See also ==
- Politics of Benin
- List of political parties by country
