= Liberal Democrats' Rally for National Reconstruction – Vivoten =

Political party in Benin

Liberal Democrats' Rally for National Reconstruction – Vivoten Rassemblement des Démocrates Libéraux pour la Reconstruction nationale
- Leader: Sévérin Adjovi
- Ideology: Liberal democracy

The Liberal Democrats' Rally for National Reconstruction-Vivotene (French: Rassemblement des Démocrates Libéraux pour la Reconstruction nationale, RDL-Vivoten) is a political party of Benin led by Sévérin Adjovi.

== History ==
The party contested the 1991 parliamentary elections, receiving 6% of the vote and winning four of the 64 seats in the National Assembly. It nominated its leader Sévérin Adjovi for the 1991 presidential election; Adjovi finished seventh with 3% of the vote.

In the 1995 parliamentary elections the party received 4% of the vote, winning three seats. Following the elections it joined an opposition alliance alongside Action Front for Renewal and Development and Our Common Cause. However, after Mathieu Kérékou won the 1996 presidential elections, the party joined the government and Adjovi was appointed Minister of Defence, a position he served in until being named Minister of Communications, Culture and Information.

The party contested the 1999 parliamentary elections as part of the Movement for Citizens' Commitment and Awakening, which won only two seats. In the 2001 presidential election the party nominated Léandre Djagoué. He finished twelfth with 0.35% of the vote. For the 2006 presidential elections the party had two candidates; Adjovi (who finished seventh with 2% of the vote) and Djagoué (who finished 24th with 0.15% of the vote).

The party was part of the Union for Future Benin alliance for the 2003 parliamentary elections.

In the 2011 parliamentary elections the party was part of the Union Makes the Nation alliance, which won 30 of the 83 seats. It also ran separately, received 1% of the vote, failing to win a seat.
