= Kamarou Fassassi =

Beninese politician

Kamarou Fassassi (October 10, 1948 – December 4, 2016) was a Beninese politician.

== Early life and political career ==
Fassassi was born in Porto-Novo. He was director of the Cabinet of the president of the National Assembly of Benin, Adrien Houngbédji, from 1992 to 1995, and he was elected to the National Assembly in the March 1995 parliamentary election. When Mathieu Kérékou returned to the Presidency in 1996, Fassassi became Minister of Public Works and Transport, serving in that position until 1998.

He was again elected to the National Assembly as a candidate of the Democratic Renewal Party in the March 1999 parliamentary election, but in 2000 he formed a new party, the Party of the Awakening of the Democrats of the New Generation (Parti du Réveil de Démocrates de la Nouvelle Génération, PRD-Nouvelle Génération), which supported the re-election of President Kérékou in the March 2001 presidential election. In May 2001 he was appointed Minister of Mines, Energy and Hydraulics, serving until April 2006, when Yayi Boni became president.

Fassassi was elected to the National Assembly as a candidate of the Union for Future Benin in the March 2003 parliamentary election. In Copargo in January 2006, he announced that he would be the PRD-Nouvelle Génération's candidate in the March 2006 presidential election, saying that he wanted to defend Kérékou's legacy. In the election, which Boni won, Fassassi took ninth place with 0.98% of the vote.

== Death ==
He died on December 4, 2016, at CNHU (national university hospital center).
