= National Forum of Civil and Civic Awakening =

Political party in Benin

The National Forum of Civil and Civic Awakening (French: Forum National pour l’Eveil Civil et Civique, FONEC) was a political party in Benin.

== History ==
FONEC was established in late 1995. In the 1996 presidential elections, it supported the victorious candidate Mathieu Kérékou.

The party later joined the Suru Alliance to contest the 1999 parliamentary elections, alongside the Union for Democracy and National Reconstruction (UDRN), the Forum for Democracy, Development and Morality (FDDM) and the Union for Homeland and Progress (UPP). The alliance received 1.5% of the vote, winning a single seat taken by the UPP's Gado Girigissou.

It was part of the Union for Future Benin for the 2003 elections.
