= 1991 Beninese parliamentary election =

- 17 February 1991
- All 64 seats in the National Assembly; 33 seats needed for a majority
- Turnout: 51.68%
Party	Leader	Vote %	Seats
UTRD	Nicéphore Soglo	18.86	12
RND	Joseph Keke	12.08	7
PRD–PNDD	Pascal Chabi Kao	11.72	9
NCC	Albert Tévoédjrè	10.13	6
PSD–UNSP	Bruno Amoussou	9.84	8
MNDD–MSUP–UDRN	Bertin Borna	8.40	6
UDSN	Sacca Lafia	7.08	5
RDL-Vivoten	Sévérin Adjovi	5.62	4
ADP–UDRS	Akindes Adekpedjou	3.76	2
ASD–BSD	Robert Dossou	3.47	3
UNDP	Robert Tagnon	3.07	1
URP–PNT		1.99	1
This lists parties that won seats. See the complete results below.

Parliamentary elections were held in Benin on 17 February 1991, the first multi-party elections in the country since 1964. The Union for the Triumph of Democratic Renewal alliance emerged as the largest faction, with 12 of the 64 seats in the National Assembly. Voter turnout was 51.7%.

== Results ==
Party	Votes	%	Seats
Union for the Triumph of Democratic Renewal	194,213	18.86	12
National Rally for Democracy	124,392	12.08	7
PRD–PNDD	120,705	11.72	9
Our Common Cause	104,347	10.13	6
PSD–UNSP	101,348	9.84	8
MNDD–MSUP–UDRN	86,556	8.40	6
Union for Democracy and National Solidarity	72,899	7.08	5
Liberal Democrats' Rally for National Reconstruction – Vivoten	57,852	5.62	4
ADP–UDRS	38,684	3.76	2
ASD–BSD	35,700	3.47	3
National Union for Democracy and Progress	31,601	3.07	1
Democratic Union for Economic and Social Development	25,893	2.51	0
People's Republican Union–National Labour Party	20,490	1.99	1
Builders and Managers of Freedom and Development	15,337	1.49	0
Total	1,030,017	100.00	64
Valid votes	1,030,017	96.32	
Invalid/blank votes	39,350	3.68	
Total votes	1,069,367	100.00	
Registered voters/turnout	2,069,343	51.68	
Source: Nohlen et al.
