= Union for Homeland and Progress =

The Union for Homeland and Progress (French: Union pour la Patrie et le Progrès, UPP) was a political party in Benin.

== History ==
The UPP was established in 1996 and joined the Suru Alliance to contest the 1999 parliamentary elections, alongside the Union for Democracy and National Reconstruction, the Forum for Democracy, Development and Morality and the National Forum of Civil and Civic Awakening. The alliance received 1.5% of the vote, winning a single seat taken by the UPP's Gado Girigissou.
