= Democratic Party for National Union =

Political party in Benin

The Democratic Party for National Union (French: Parti Démocratique pour l'Union Nationale, PDUN) was a political party in Benin led by Vincent Awounou.

== History ==
The PDUN contested the 1995 parliamentary elections as part of the Chameleon Alliance, alongside the National Salvation Front, the National Union for Solidarity and Development and the Union of Forces of Progress. The alliance received 1.5% of the vote, winning a single seat.
