= National Union for Solidarity and Development =

The National Union for Solidarity and Development (French: Union Nationale pour la Solidarité et le Developpement, UNSD) was a political party in Benin led by Adolphe Biaou.

== History ==
The UNSD was established in 1995, and contested the parliamentary elections that year as part of the Chameleon Alliance, alongside the National Salvation Front, the Democratic Party for National Union and the Union of Forces of Progress. The alliance received 1.5% of the vote, winning a single seat. Biaou took the sole seat.

The party formed an alliance with the Rally for Progress and Renewal (RPR) prior to the 1999 elections. The two parties received 2.2% of the vote, winning one seat, taken by the RPR's Valentin Aditi Houdé.
