= Impulse for Progress and Development =

Political alliance in Benin

Impulse for Progress and Development (French: Impulsion pour le Progrès et le Développement, IPD), also referred to as Impulse to Progress and Democracy, was a political alliance and party in Benin.

== History ==
The Impulse for Progress and Development alliance was formed for the 1995 parliamentary elections as part of the opposition to President Nicéphore Soglo. It consisted of the National Party for Democracy and Development (PNDD), Alliance for Civic Renewal (ARC) and the Party for Democracy and Progress (PDP) and headed by Moïse Mensah. The alliance received 3% of the vote and won three seats, taken by Valentin Houde, Théophile Nata and Albert Sansouamou.

The PNDD left to join the Star Alliance for the 1999 parliamentary elections, but although the IPD's vote share fell to 2%, it increased its parliamentary representation, winning four seats, taken by Nata, Félix Jean Agbayahun, Imorou Sale and Emmanuel Tiando. Although the Benin Rebirth Party won around a third of the seats, the IPD was one of eight groups in parliament to form a coalition government. After joining the government, Nata was appointed Minister of Rural Development in 1999 and then Minister of Agriculture in 2001.

By the 2003 parliamentary elections the IPD had become a unitary party. It contested the elections as part of the 'Presidential Movement' bloc, winning two seats, taken by Nata and Kotoi Imorou Sarre.

Efforts were made to revive the party in 2015 by national secretary Mike Azilinon.
