= 1991 Beninese presidential election =

Election of Nicéphore Soglo

- 10 March 1991 (first round); 24 March 1991 (second round)
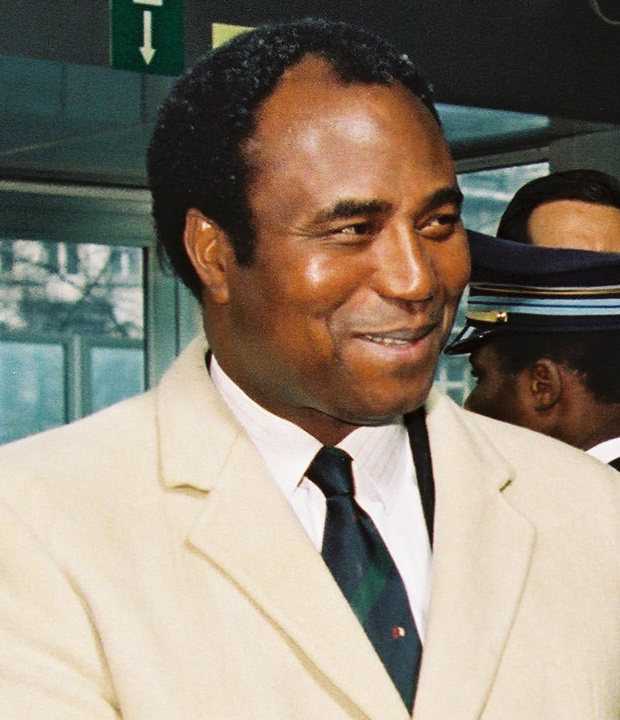

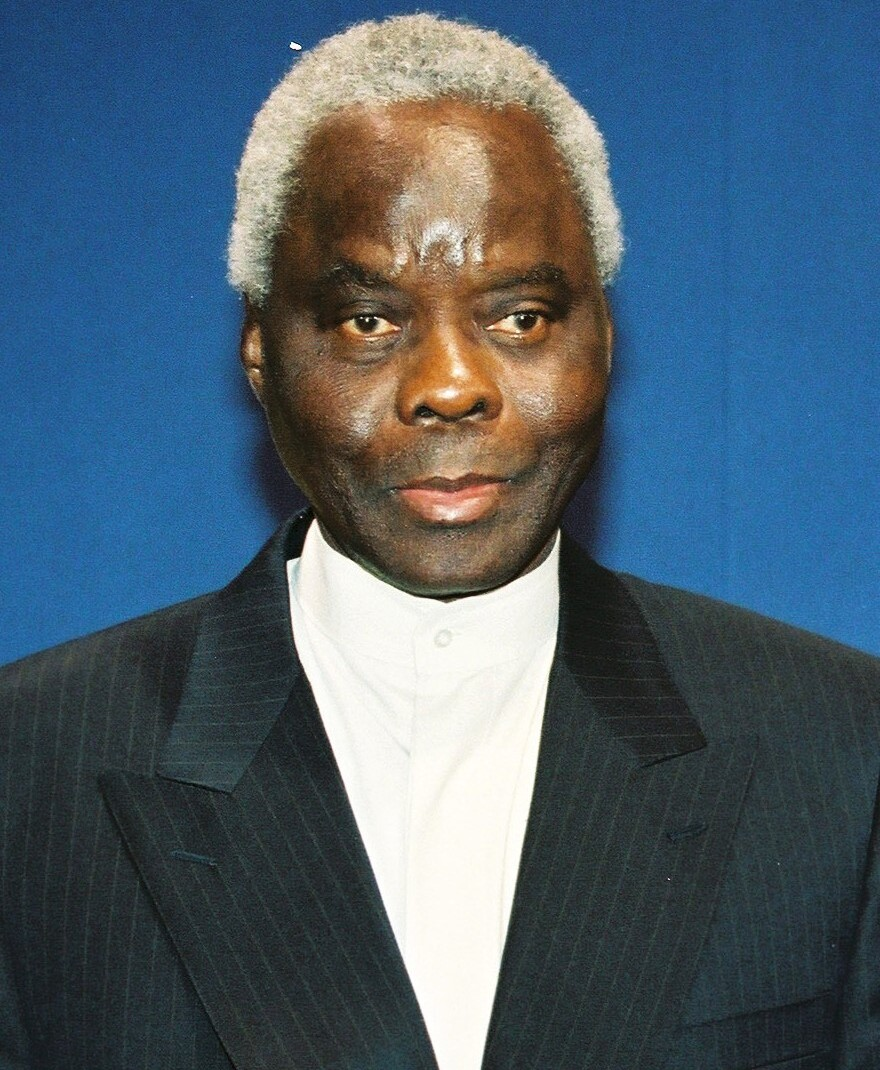
Candidate	Nicéphore Soglo	Mathieu Kérékou
Party	UTRD	Independent
Popular vote	881,205	423,501
Percentage	67.54%	32.46%
President before election
Mathieu Kérékou
Independent
Elected President
Nicéphore Soglo
UTRD

Presidential elections were held in Benin in March 1991, the first direct presidential elections since 1970. Elections under the military regime of Mathieu Kérékou had been indirect, with the president chosen by the National Assembly.

The first round, held on 10 March, saw no candidate receive more than 37% of the vote. Prime Minister Nicéphore Soglo led the field, with Kérékou in second place. The second round on 24 March resulted in a decisive victory for Soglo, with almost two-thirds of the vote. Voter turnout was 56% in the first round and 64% in the second.

The elections marked the first instance in post-colonial Francophone Africa that an opposition candidate won a free election.

== Results ==
Candidate	Party	First round		Second round	
Candidate	Party	Votes	%	Votes	%
Nicéphore Soglo	Union for the Triumph of Democratic Renewal	415,262	36.31	881,205	67.54
Mathieu Kérékou	Independent	310,978	27.19	423,501	32.46
Albert Tévoédjrè	Our Common Cause	162,498	14.21		
Bruno Amoussou	Social Democratic Party	65,999	5.77		
Adrien Houngbédji	Democratic Renewal Party	51,888	4.54		
Moise Mensah	Independent	39,250	3.43		
Sévérin Adjovi	RDLRN–Vivoten	29,854	2.61		
Bertin Borna	Independent	18,484	1.62		
Idelphonse Lemon	Independent	11,297	0.99		
Assani Fasassi	Independent	10,334	0.90		
Gatien Houngbédji	Democratic Union for Economic and Social Development	10,210	0.89		
Robert Dossou	Alliance for Social Democracy	9,551	0.84		
Thomas Goudou	Builders and Managers of Freedom and Development	8,008	0.70		
Total		1,143,613	100.00	1,304,706	100.00
Valid votes		1,143,613	98.37	1,304,706	99.21
Invalid/blank votes		18,902	1.63	10,417	0.79
Total votes		1,162,515	100.00	1,315,123	100.00
Registered voters/turnout		2,064,311	56.31	2,052,638	64.07
Source: African Elections Database, Nohlen et al.
