= National Party for Democracy and Development =

Political party in Benin

The National Party for Democracy and Development (French: Parti National pour la Démocratie el le Développement, PNDD) was a political party in Benin.

== History ==
The PNDD was established in 1989 by former President Hubert Maga. It contested the 1991 parliamentary election in an alliance with the Democratic Renewal Party. The alliance won nine seats, of which four were taken by the PNDD.

The party joined the Impulse for Progress and Development alliance for the 1995 parliamentary elections, alongside the Alliance for Civic Renewal and the Party for Democracy and Progress. The alliance won three seats.

Prior to the 1999 elections the party joined the Star Alliance. The alliance received 4% of the vote, winning four seats.
