= Alliance for Democracy and Development =

Alliance for Democracy and Development may refer to:

- Alliance for Democracy and Development (Benin)
- Alliance for Democracy and Development (Cameroon)
- Alliance for Democracy and Development (Zambia)

== See also ==
- Democracy and Development (disambiguation)
