= Jerome Sacca Kina Guezere =

Beninese politician (1952–2005)

Jerome Sacca Kina Guezere (1952 – 11 January 2005) was a Beninese politician. He was the Fourth Vice-President of the African Union's Pan-African Parliament.

He was elected to the National Assembly of Benin for the first time in the 1991 parliamentary election and was again elected in 1995. He was a founding member of the Action Front for Renewal and Development (FARD-Alafia) in 1994. From 1996 to 1998, he served as Minister of Rural Development under President Mathieu Kérékou. In the March 1999 parliamentary election, he was again elected to the National Assembly as a FARD-Alafia candidate, and he became President of the Solidarity and Progress Parliamentary Group following the election. In the March 2003 parliamentary election, he was elected as a Union for Future Benin (UBF) candidate (with FARD-Alafia being one of the component parties of the UBF). He also served as First Vice-President of the National Assembly.

He was elected Fourth Vice-President of the Pan-African Parliament when it was inaugurated in March 2004. He was representing the Pan-African Parliament at Ghanaian President John Kufuor's inauguration for his second term in Accra when he fell ill, and he subsequently died in Benin on 11 January 2005.
