= Antoine Dayori =

Beninese politician

Antoine Dayori is a Beninese politician and the leader of the Hope Force (Force Espoir) political party.

Dayori was one of five Force Clé candidates elected to the National Assembly in the March 2003 parliamentary election. He served as Minister of Culture, Crafts, and Tourism from February 2005 to April 2006. He was a candidate in the March 2006 presidential election, taking eighth place and 1.25% of the vote. In the March 2007 parliamentary election, he was one of two Hope Force candidates to be elected to the National Assembly.
