= Lazare Sèhouéto =

Beninese politician

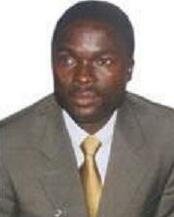
Lazare Sèhouéto

Lazare Maurice Sèhouéto (born April 18, 1963) is a Beninese politician. Under President Mathieu Kérékou, he served as Minister of Commerce, Industry, Community Development, and the Promotion of Employment from May 2001 to June 2003, and as Minister of Agriculture, Husbandry, and Fishing from June 2003 to February 2005. He was one of five Force Clé candidates elected to the National Assembly in the March 2003 parliamentary election. He was the candidate of the Movement for the People's Alternative in the March 2006 presidential election, taking sixth place with 2.04% of the vote. In the 2007 parliamentary election he was one of four Key Fource (Force Clé) candidates to be elected.
