= National Movement for Democracy and Development =

The National Movement for Democracy and Development (French: Mouvement Nationale pour la Démocratie et le Développement, MNDD) was a left-wing political party in Benin.

== History ==
The MNDD was established in 1990 by Bertin Borna, who was popular in the north of the country. It contested the 1991 elections as part of three-party alliance alongside the Movement for Solidarity, Union and Progress (MSUP) and the Union for Democracy and National Reconstruction (UDRN). The three parties received 8% of the vote and won six of the 64 seats in the National Assembly.

The alliance split prior to the 1995 elections, with the MNDD running alone and the other two remaining in an alliance. The MNDD won a single seat (taken by Borna) with 2% of the vote, whilst the MSUP–UDRN alliance received 1% of the vote and failed to win a seat.
