= National Union for Solidarity and Progress =

The National Union for Solidarity and Progress (French: Union Nationale pour la Solidarité et le Progrès, UNSP) was a political party in Benin led by Eustache Sarré.

== History ==
The UNSP contested the 1991 parliamentary elections in an alliance with the Social Democratic Party. The alliance received 10% of the vote and won 8 of the 64 seats in the National Assembly. Most of the MPs joined Renewal alliance in 1993.

Prior to the 1995 elections the party formed the "New Generation" alliance with the Forum for Democracy, Development and Morality. The two parties received 3% of the vote, winning two seats. The seats were taken by Souléman Zoumarou and Mamoudou Zoumarou.

It was part of the Star Alliance for the 1999 elections. The Alliance received 4% of the vote and won four seats. The party nominated Wallis Zoumarou as its candidate for the 2001 presidential elections. Zoumarou finished ninth in a field of 17 candidates.
