= Information Systems and Digital Agency (Benin) =

Information Systems and Digital Agency (Agence des Systèmes d'Information et du Numérique)
- Established: June 1, 2022
- Merger of: Digital Development Agency (ADN), Information Services and Systems Agency (ASSI), National Agency for Information Systems Security (ANSSI), Beninese Agency for the Universal Service of Electronic Communications and Post (ABSUCEP)
- Type: Public institution
- Headquarters: Cotonou, Benin
- Region served: Benin
- Official language: French
- Key people: Marc André Loko
- Affiliations: Ministry for the Digital Economy and Digitization, Ministry of Economy and Finance of Benin

Information Systems and Digital Agency (French: Agence des Systèmes d'Information et du Numérique; ASIN) is a social and scientific public institution in Benin. It was created by Decree No. 2022-324 of June 1, 2022, merging the Digital Development Agency (French: Agence de Développement du Numérique; ADN), the Information Services and Systems Agency (French: Agence des Services et Systèmes d'Information; ASSI), the National Agency for Information Systems Security (French:Agence Nationale de la Sécurité des Systèmes d'Information; ANSSI), and the Beninese Agency for the Universal Service of Electronic Communications and Post (French: Agence Béninoise du Service Universel des Communications Électroniques et de la Poste; ABSUCEP). The Agency operates under the dual supervision of the Ministry for the Digital Economy and Digitization and the Ministry of Economy and Finance of Benin. The head of ASIN is Marc André Loko, who is the director general and chairman of the Board of Directors of the Société Béninoise d’Infrastructures Numériques (SBIN).

== Operations ==
The composition, responsibilities, organization, and operation of the ASIN are defined by the Law No. 2020-20 of September 2, 2020, establishing, organizing, and operating public enterprises in the Republic of Benin and the Uniform Act of OHADA on Commercial Companies and Economic Interest Groupings. The Information Systems and Digital Agency has legal personality and financial autonomy. The mission of the ASIN is the operational implementation of projects related to the digital sector. ASIN consists of a board of directors composed of five members: a representative of the Presidency; two representatives from the ministry responsible for digital affairs; two representatives from the ministry responsible for finances. The Board of Directors members are appointed by decree issued by the Council of Ministers, upon proposal from the represented structures, for a renewable three-year term.

It also incled a General Directorate; a Person Responsible for Public Procurement; a Commission for the Opening and Evaluation of Offers. The current president of the Board of Directors of the ASIN is the Minister of Economy and Finance, Romuald Wadagni.

The headquarters of the Information Systems and Digital Agency are located in Cotonou. It can be transferred to any other location in the national territory by decision of the Council of Ministers and upon the proposal of the board of directors.
