= 1995 Beninese parliamentary election =

- 28 March 1995
- All 83 seats in the National Assembly; 42 seats needed for a majority
Party	Leader	Vote %	Seats
PRD	Adrien Houngbédji	15.42	19
RB	Rosine Vieyra Soglo	14.55	21
PSD	Bruno Amoussou	7.66	8
FARD-Alafia	Jerome Sacca Kina Guezere	6.16	10
NCC	Albert Tévoédjrè	5.68	3
UDSN	Mama Amadou N'Diaye	4.87	5
RDL-Vivoten	Sévérin Adjovi	4.33	3
Communist	Pascal Fantodji	3.29	1
FDDM–UNSP		3.07	2
IPD	Moïse Mensah	2.68	3
RAP		2.58	1
UNDP	Robert Tagnon	2.57	1
ADD		2.49	1
ADP	Akindes Adekpedjou	2.46	1
MNDD	Bertin Borna	1.99	1
Chameleon		1.50	1
RDP	Dominique Houngninou	1.44	1
ASD	Robert Dossou	1.39	1
This lists parties that won seats. See the complete results below.

Parliamentary elections were held in Benin on 28 March 1995, although voting for thirteen seats was re-run on 28 May after the Constitutional Court invalidated the results due to irregularities.

The Democratic Renewal Party emerged as the largest party in the National Assembly, winning 19 of the 83 seats. Voter turnout was 75.8%.

The Constitutional Court declared the results of one seat invalid, reducing the size of the National Assembly to 82 seats.

== Results ==
Party	Original results		After re-run		Seats
Party	Votes	%	Votes	%	Seats
Democratic Renewal Party	265,635	14.24	225,175	15.42	19
Benin Rebirth Party	250,474	13.43	212,428	14.55	21
Social Democratic Party	136,240	7.30	111,756	7.66	8
Action Front for Renewal and Development	129,831	6.96	89,919	6.16	10
Our Common Cause	105,280	5.64	82,898	5.68	3
Union for Democracy and National Solidarity	94,486	5.07	71,061	4.87	5
Liberal Democrats' Rally for National Reconstruction – Vivoten	86,437	4.63	63,152	4.33	3
Communist Party of Benin	73,134	3.92	48,021	3.29	1
FDDM–UNSP	58,640	3.14	44,752	3.07	2
Impulse for Progress and Development	50,255	2.69	39,149	2.68	3
African Rally for Progress and National Solidarity	47,068	2.52	37,690	2.58	1
National Union for Democracy and Progress	45,977	2.47	37,563	2.57	1
Alliance for Democracy and Development	41,420	2.22	36,370	2.49	1
Alliance for Democracy and Progress	46,571	2.50	35,896	2.46	1
National Movement for Democracy and Development	38,758	2.08	28,993	1.99	1
National Rally for Democracy	35,511	1.90	28,455	1.95	0
Political Alliance of Independents (PUR–UPR–MDS)	33,233	1.78	28,162	1.93	0
Union for Labour and Democracy–National Labour Party	34,919	1.87	25,571	1.75	0
National Rally for Justice and Peace–Party of Salvation	32,294	1.73	23,232	1.59	0
Chameleon Alliance	29,856	1.60	21,960	1.50	1
Democratic Union of the Forces of Progress	27,313	1.46	21,093	1.44	0
Rally for Democracy and Pan-Africanism	26,359	1.41	21,027	1.44	1
Rally for Democracy and Work–National Party for Solidarity and Progress	26,206	1.41	20,939	1.43	0
Alliance for Social Democracy	28,392	1.52	20,266	1.39	1
MSUP–UDRN	19,812	1.06	15,006	1.03	0
UDES–RDD	17,054	0.91	13,355	0.91	0
Democratic Union for Development	18,284	0.98	12,125	0.83	0
United Front for Renewal, Democracy, Freedom and Development	18,716	1.00	12,118	0.83	0
PESJ–PR–RASN	17,277	0.93	11,508	0.79	0
Union for Freedom and Development	14,850	0.80	11,348	0.78	0
CDU–PRB–PCP–RUND	14,862	0.80	8,913	0.61	0
Total	1,865,144	100.00	1,459,901	100.00	83
Source: Election Passport
