= Daniel Tawéma =

Beninese politician (born 1947)

Daniel Tawéma (born December 31, 1947) is a Beninese politician. During the regime of Mathieu Kérékou, he became Deputy Director of the Civil Cabinet in April 1979 and served as Director of the Cabinet from 1983 to 1989. From August 1989 to March 1990, he was Minister of Foreign Affairs and Cooperation. Tawéma was a member of the National Assembly of Benin from 1991 to 1995. He was a founding member of the Action Front for Renewal and Development (FARD-Alafia) in 1994. During Kérékou's second period in office, Tawéma was Minister of the Interior from 1998 to February 2005 (Minister of the Interior, Security, and Territorial Administration from 1998 to 2001, and Minister of the Interior, Security, and Decentralization from 2001 to 2005). In February 2004, he was elected as the secretary general of FARD-Alafia, succeeding Jerome Sacca Kina Guezere. In December 2005, Tawéma was designated as his party's candidate for the March 2006 presidential election. In the election, he received 12th place and 0.60% of the vote.
