= Alliance of the Forces of Progress =

Alliance of the Forces of Progress may refer to:

- Alliance of the Forces of Progress (Benin)
- Alliance of the Forces of Progress (Senegal)
