= Pascal Chabi Kao =

Beninese politician (1935–2024)

Pascal Chabi Kao (10 March 1935 – 5 August 2024) was a Beninese politician.

Chabi Kao was born on 10 March 1935 in Parakou. He was educated at the teachers' training college in Côte d'Ivoire and the University of Aix-en-Provence in France, earning a bachelor's degree in economics. He served as secretary general of the Dahomeyan Development Bank. Chabi Kao served in the cabinet of president Hubert Maga from 1960 to 1963, developing a close personal relationship. He was appointed minister of labor under Christophe Soglo from 1966 to 1967. He had foreknowledge of the 1967 coup that toppled Soglo, and was the minister of finance and civil service in the administrations of Alphonse Alley and Maurice Kouandete, the only civilian in the cabinet.

Chabi Kao threatened secession of northern Dahomey in 1970 after the presidential election that would have reinstated Maga was annulled, but was named Minister of Labor and Finance after the Presidential Council was established in May 1970. He was accused of several irregularities, such as bribery, influence peddling, and embezzlement in the Kovacs affair of 1972. Justin Ahomadégbé-Tomêtin attempted to fire him, but was blocked by Maga. This sparked the October 1972 coup led by Mathieu Kérékou, during which Chabi Kao was briefly imprisoned. Along with Alley and Jean-Baptiste Hachème, Chabi Kao was accused of planning a coup against Kérékou on 28 February 1973 and was imprisoned with 20 years of hard labor. Chabi Kao was attached to the ministry of finance after his early release from prison. He joined Maga's National Party for Democracy and Development in 1989 and was elected to a seat in the National Assembly in the 1991 election.

Chabi Kao died on 5 August 2024, at the age of 89.
