= Rally for National Unity and Democracy =

The Rally for National Unity and Democracy (French: Rassemblement pour l'Unité Nationale et la Démocratie, RUND) was a political party in Benin.

== History ==
The party contested the 1999 elections, receiving 1.3% of the vote and winning a single seat, taken by Ibrahima Idrissou. However, the party's list for the 2003 elections was rejected by CENA.

Idrissou was the party's candidate in the 2006 presidential election. He received 0.6% of the vote, finishing thirteenth in a field of 26 candidates.
