= Bloc for Social Democracy =

Political party in Benin

The Bloc for Social Democracy (French: Bloc pour la Social-Démocratie, BSD) was a political party in Benin led by Michel Magnide.

== History ==
In the 1991 parliamentary elections the party ran in an alliance with the Alliance for Social Democracy. The alliance received 3.5% of the vote, winning three seats.

It contested the 1999 elections as part of the UDES Alliance, alongside the Democratic Union for Economic and Social Development, the MCP, the CND and the National Salvation Front. The alliance failed to win a seat.
