= Grégoire Laourou =

Beninese politician (1952/1953–2026)

Member of the National Assembly of Benin
- In office April 2007 – April 2015

Minister of Economy and Finance of Benin
- In office 2002–2005
- President: Mathieu Kérékou
- Preceded by: Abdoulaye Bio Tchané
- Succeeded by: Cosme Sèhlin

Personal details
- Born: 1952 or 1953 Bantè, French Dahomey, French West Africa
- Died: 24 or 25 August 2026 (aged 73)

Grégoire Laourou (1952 or 1953 – 24 or 25 August 2026) was a Beninese politician. He supported presidential candidate Sébastien Ajavon in the 2016 Beninese presidential election.

== Life and career ==
Laourou served as the minister of economy and finance between 2002 and 2005. He was elected WAEMU council president for two years, starting in 2004. He also became a member of the National Assembly, elected in 2007 and 2011. In that capacity, he chaired the Assembly's finance committee.

Laourou died on the night of 24–25 August 2026, at the age of 73.
