= UFP =

UFP is an abbreviation that has several meanings:

- Ultrafine particle, a particulate matter of nanoscale size (less than 100 nanometres in diameter)
- Union des forces progressistes, a former Canadian left-wing political party of Quebec
- Union of Forces of Progress, a former political party in Benin
- Union of the Forces of Progress (Union des Forces du Progrès), a political party in Mauritania
- The Unique Fixed Point rule in the theory of communicating sequential processes
- United Federal Party, a former political party of Southern Rhodesia from 1934 to 1965
- United Federation of Planets, of the fictional Star Trek universe.
- United Future Party, a South Korean conservative political party.
- University Foundation Programme, a one-year intensive course that leads to entry to a wide range of universities in the United Kingdom
