= National Forum =

National Forum may refer to:

- ABC National Forum, an Australian television program
- National Forum (Croatia), a former citizen association and a political party in Croatia
- National Forum (Georgia), a political party in Georgia in the Caucasus
- National Forum of Civil and Civic Awakening, a political party in Benin
- National Forum of Music, a music venue in Wrocław, Poland
- National Forum on Europe, Ireland, founded to inform the public in a non-partisan and neutral manner about developments in the European Union

== See also ==
- Forum (disambiguation)
