= Democratic Party of Benin =

- Founded: 1996
- Ideology: Social democracy Third way

The Democratic Party of Benin (French: Parti Démocratique du Bénin, PDB) was a political party in Benin.

== History ==
The party was established by Soulé Dankoro in 1996. In the 1999 parliamentary elections the party received 1.9% of the vote, winning one seat, with Dankoro becoming its sole MP. Dankoro was the party's candidate for the 2001 presidential elections, but he received less than 1% of the vote, finishing seventh in a field of seventeen candidates. The party joined the New Alliance for the 2003 parliamentary elections, with the alliance winning two seats.

Dankoro ran for the presidency on the party's ticket for a second time in 2006, but again received less than 1% of the vote, finishing fifteenth out of twenty-six candidates.
