= Party of Salvation =

The Party of Salvation (French: Parti du Salut, PS) was a political party in Benin.

== History ==
The PS was established in 1994. It contested the 1995 parliamentary elections in an alliance with the National Rally for Justice and Peace. However, the two parties failed to win a seat.

The party ran alone in the 1999 elections, receiving 2.3% of the vote and winning one seat. Beikon Nestor Ezin became the party's sole MP.

Prior to the 2003 elections the party joined the Presidential Movement, an alliance of supporters of Mathieu Kérékou, who had won the 2001 presidential elections. It ran on a combined list with the Movement for Development by Culture, Salute Party and the Congress of People for Progress, which won two seats.
