= New Alliance =

New Alliance may refer to:

- New Alliance (Benin), a political party in Benin
- Liberal Alliance (Denmark), a political party in Denmark formerly known as New Alliance
- New Alliance Records, a record label in the U.S.

== See also ==
- New Alliance for Democracy and Development in Burundi
- New Alliance Party (Mexico), a political party in Mexico
- New Alliance Party, a former political party in the United States
- New Alliance Party (Cook Islands)
