= 1945 French constitutional referendum in Mauritania–Senegal =

A constitutional referendum was held in Mauritania and Senegal on 21 October 1945 as part of the wider French constitutional referendum. The first question on the new French National Assembly serving as a constituent assembly was approved by 99% of voters, but the temporary constitution proposed in the second question was rejected by 51% of voters. Both proposals were approved in the overall vote. Voter turnout was 60%.

== Results ==
=== Question I ===
Do you agree that the assembly now elected will serve as a constituent assembly?

Choice	Votes	%
For	25,772	98.73
Against	332	1.27
Total	26,104	100.00
Valid votes	26,104	97.65
Invalid/blank votes	628	2.35
Total votes	26,732	100.00
Registered voters/turnout	44,292	60.35
Source: Sternberger et al.

=== Question II ===
Do you agree that until the enforcement of a new Constitution, public affairs will be organised according to the proposal of the law which you find reproduced on the rear of the ballot?

Choice	Votes	%
For	12,790	49.06
Against	13,280	50.94
Total	26,070	100.00
Valid votes	26,070	97.52
Invalid/blank votes	662	2.48
Total votes	26,732	100.00
Registered voters/turnout	44,292	60.35
Source: Sternberger et al.
