= Alliance for Democracy and Progress =

Alliance for Democracy and Progress may refer to:

- Alliance for Democracy and Progress (Benin)
- Alliance for Democracy and Progress (Central African Republic)
- Alliance for Democracy and Progress (Mali)
