= Union for the Triumph of Democratic Renewal =

The Union for the Triumph of Democratic Renewal (French: Union pour le Triomphe du Renouveau Démocratique, UTRD) was a political alliance in Benin.

== History ==
The UTRD was established in 1991 to support presidential candidate Nicéphore Soglo, and initially consisted of the Democratic Union of the Forces of Progress (UDFP), the Movement for Democracy and Social Progress (MDPS) and the Union for Liberty and Development (ULD). It won 12 seats in the 1991 parliamentary election, emerging as the largest faction in the 64-seat National Assembly. Soglo went on to win the presidential elections in March, beating Mathieu Kérékou in a runoff.

Subsequently the alliance expanded, changing its name to New Republic (Nouvelle République) when an additional nine MPs joined. In 1993 it became Renewal (La Renouveau) after absorbing another 13 MPs, giving it a total of 34 seats. The Social Democratic Party, National Union for Solidarity and Progress and Union for Democracy and National Solidarity were amongst the parties that joined.

The alliance split prior to the 1995 elections. Of the three original parties, only the UDFP contested the elections, failing to win a seat.
