= 1945 French constitutional referendum in Algeria =

A constitutional referendum was held in Algeria on 21 October 1945 as part of the wider 1945 French constitutional referendum.

Both referendum questions were approved by voters, with a turnout of 69%.

== Results ==
=== Question I ===
| Choice | Votes | % |
|---|---|---|
| For | 313.425 | 96.1 |
| Against | 12,741 | 3.9 |
| Invalid/blank votes | 16,562 | – |
| Total | 342,728 | 100 |
| Registered voters/turnout | 325,416 | 71.6 |
Source: Sternberger et al.

=== Question II ===
| Choice | Votes | % |
|---|---|---|
| For | 232,913 | 71.6 |
| Against | 92,503 | 28.4 |
| Invalid/blank votes | 17,312 | – |
| Total | 342,728 | 100 |
| Registered voters/turnout | 325,416 | 71.6 |
Source: Sternberger et al.
