= Democracy and Development =

Democracy and Development occurs in the names of many African organisations and political parties:

- Alliance for Democracy and Development (Benin)
- Alliance for Democracy and Development (Cameroon)
- Alliance for Democracy and Development (Zambia)
- Centre for Democracy and Development
- Forum for Democracy and Development in Zambia
- Gabonese Union for Democracy and Development in Gabon
- National Alliance for Democracy and Development in Gambia
- National Council for Democracy and Development in Guinea
- National Union for Democracy and Development in Burkina Faso
- New Alliance for Democracy and Development in Burundi
- Rally for Democracy and Development in the Republic of the Congo
- Rally for the Support of Democracy and Development in Togo
- Union for Democracy and Development (Mali)
- Union of Forces for Democracy and Development
- Democracy and Development, a book by Adam Przeworski

== See also ==
- Movement for Democracy and Development (disambiguation)
