= 1945 French constitutional referendum in Cameroon =

A referendum was held in French Cameroons on 21 October 1945 as part of the wider French constitutional referendum.

Both referendum questions were approved by large margins. Voter turnout was 71.1%.

== Results ==
=== Question I ===
Do you agree that the assembly now elected will serve as a constituent assembly?

| Choice | Votes | % |
|---|---|---|
| For | 1,293 | 96.3 |
| Against | 50 | 3.7 |
| Invalid/blank votes | 72 | – |
| Total | 1,415 | 100 |
| Registered voters/turnout | 1,991 | 71.1 |
Source: Sternberger et al.

=== Question II ===
Do you agree that until the enforcement of a new Constitution, public affairs will be organised according to the proposal of the law which you find reproduced on the rear of the ballot?

| Choice | Votes | % |
|---|---|---|
| For | 1,218 | 90.6 |
| Against | 127 | 9.4 |
| Invalid/blank votes | 70 | – |
| Total | 1,345 | 100 |
| Registered voters/turnout | 1,991 | 71.1 |
Source: Sternberger et al.
