= Movement for Democracy and Development =

Movement for Democracy and Development may refer to:

- Citizens' Movement for Democracy and Development in Togo
- Congolese Movement for Democracy and Integral Development in the Republic of the Congo
- Movement for Democracy and Development (Central African Republic)
- National Republican Movement for Democracy and Development in Rwanda

== See also ==
- Movement for Democracy (disambiguation)
- Democracy and Development (disambiguation)
