= 1936 Dahomeyan Administrative Council election =

- 1936
- 3 elected seats on the Administrative Council

Administrative Council elections were held in Dahomey in 1936.

== Electoral system ==
Three members of the Administrative Council were elected from single-member constituencies; Abomey, Ouidah and Porto-Novo. However, the franchise was extremely restricted.

== Campaign ==
Abomey councillor Richard Johnson opted to contest the Ouidah seat.

== Results ==
In a reversal of the 1934 elections, La Voix candidate Casimir d'Almeida defeated the incumbent Augustin Nicoué in Porto-Novo.

Constituency	Elected candidate	Losing candidate(s)
Abomey	Victorin Féliho	
Ouidah	Richard Johnson	Ambroise Dossou-Yovo
Porto-Novo	Casimir d'Almeida	Augustin Nicoué
