= Movement for Solidarity, Union and Progress =

The Movement for Solidarity, Union and Progress (French: Mouvement pour la Solidarité, l'Union et le Progrès, MSUP) was a political party in Benin led Adebo Adeniyi Djamiou.

== History ==
The MSUP contested the 1991 elections as part of three-party alliance alongside the National Movement for Democracy and Development (MNDD) and the Union for Democracy and National Reconstruction (UDRN). The three parties received 8% of the vote and won six of the 64 seats in the National Assembly.

The alliance split prior to the 1995 elections, with the MNDD running alone and the other two remaining in an alliance. Although the MNDD won a single seat with 2% of the vote, the MSUP–UDRN alliance received only 1% of the vote and failed to win a seat. Djamiou attempted to sought to have the election results in Cotonou overturned in the Constitutional Court, but his case was deemed inadmissible.
