= Democratic Union for Social Renewal =

Political party in Benin

The Democratic Union for Social Renewal (French: Union Démocratique pour le Renouveau Social, UDRS) was a political party in Benin.

== History ==
In the 1991 parliamentary elections the party ran in an alliance with the Alliance for Democracy and Progress (ADP). The alliance received 4% of the vote, winning two seats. At the time, the party was led by Bio Gado Seko N'Goye. By 1994 he had been replaced as leader by Dénis Amoussou-Yéyé, who merged the party into the Benin Rebirth Party that year.
