= 1945 French constitutional referendum in French Sudan–Niger =

A constitutional referendum was held in French Sudan and Niger on 21 October 1945 as part of the wider French constitutional referendum. The first question on the new French National Assembly serving as a constituent assembly was approved by 97% of voters, whilst the temporary constitution proposed in the second question was approved by 86% of voters. Both proposals were also approved in the overall vote. Voter turnout was 79.3%.

== Results ==
=== Question I ===
Do you agree that the assembly now elected will serve as a constituent assembly?

Choice	Votes	%
For	2,404	97.0
Against	74	3.0
Invalid/blank votes	95	–
Total	2,573	100
Registered voters/turnout	3,243	79.3
Source: Sternberger et al.

=== Question II ===
Do you agree that until the enforcement of a new Constitution, public affairs will be organised according to the proposal of the law which you find reproduced on the rear of the ballot?

Choice	Votes	%
For	2,107	85.5
Against	356	15.5
Invalid/blank votes	110	–
Total	2,573	100
Registered voters/turnout	3,243	79.3
Source: Sternberger et al.
