= 1945 French constitutional referendum in French Somaliland =

A constitutional referendum was held in French Somaliland on 21 October 1945 as part of the wider French constitutional referendum.

Both referendum questions were approved by large margins. Voter turnout was 73.4%.

== Results ==
=== Question I ===
Do you agree that the assembly now elected will serve as a constituent assembly?

Choice	Votes	%
For	423	94.8
Against	23	5.2
Invalid/blank votes	9	–
Total	455	100
Registered voters/turnout	620	73.4
Source: Sternberger et al.

=== Question II ===
Do you agree that until the enforcement of a new Constitution, public affairs will be organised according to the proposal of the law which you find reproduced on the rear of the ballot?

Choice	Votes	%
For	346	77.6
Against	100	22.4
Invalid/blank votes	9	–
Total	455	100
Registered voters/turnout	620	73.4
Source: Sternberger et al.
