= National Labour Party (Benin) =

The National Labour Party (French: Parti National du Travail, PNT) was a political party in Benin.

== History ==
In the 1991 parliamentary elections the party ran in an alliance with the People's Republican Union (URP). The alliance received 2% of the vote, winning a single seat.

The 1995 parliamentary elections saw the PNT form an alliance with the Union for Labour and Democracy. However, the two parties failed to win a seat. The PNT joined the Alliance of Patriots for the 1999 elections, but it also failed to win a seat.
