= 1945 French constitutional referendum in Tunisia =

A constitutional referendum was held in Tunisia on 21 October 1945 as part of the wider French constitutional referendum. The first question on the new French National Assembly serving as a constituent assembly was approved by 99% of voters, whilst the temporary constitution proposed in the second question was approved by 79% of voters. Both proposals were also approved in the overall vote. Voter turnout was 69.2%.

== Results ==
=== Question I ===
Do you agree that the assembly now elected will serve as a constituent assembly?

Choice	Votes	%
For	48,503	98.7
Against	656	1.3
Invalid/blank votes	3,077	–
Total	52,236	100
Registered voters/turnout	75,526	69.2
Source: Sternberger et al.

=== Question II ===
Do you agree that until the enforcement of a new Constitution, public affairs will be organised according to the proposal of the law which you find reproduced on the rear of the ballot?

Choice	Votes	%
For	38,813	78.9
Against	10,357	21.1
Invalid/blank votes	3,066	–
Total	52,236	100
Registered voters/turnout	75,526	69.2
Source: Sternberger et al.
