= François Kouyami =

Beninese military officer and politician (1942–2024)

Minister of Public Affairs
- In office 29 January 1975 – 16 April 1975

Director of the Beninese National Gendarmerie

Personal details
- Born: 29 January 1942 Cotonou, French Dahomey, French West Africa
- Died: 17 October 2024 (aged 82) France
- Party: Independent
- Occupation: Military officer

François Kouyami (29 January 1942 – 17 October 2024) was a Beninese military officer and politician. He primarily served during the time of the People's Republic of Benin.

== Biography ==
Born in Cotonou on 29 January 1942, Kouyami was appointed director of national security and subsequently served as Minister of Public Affairs from 29 January to 16 April 1975. Under the administration of President Nicéphore Soglo, he was director of the Beninese National Gendarmerie. On 2 April 1996, he was named brigadier general and subsequently retired. In 2001, he campaigned for the presidency. He received 5,414 votes, or 0.22% of all votes cast.

Kouyami died in France on 17 October 2024, at the age of 82.

== Book ==
- Affaires d'Etat au Benin - le General François Kouyami Parle... (2011)
