= African Congress for Renewal =

The African Congress for Renewal–Dunya (French: Congrès Africain pour le Renouveau–Dunya, CAR-Dunya) was a political party in Benin.

== History ==
The party was established on 11 July 1998 as a breakaway from the Action Front for Renewal and Development. In the 1999 elections it received 3% of the vote, winning three seats. Gabé Orou Sego Orou, Albert Sinatoko and Saley Saka became MPs for the party.
