= Chameleon Alliance =

Political alliance in Benin

The Chameleon Alliance (French: Alliance Caméléon, AC) is a political alliance in Benin.

== History ==
The alliance was formed to contest the 1995 parliamentary elections, and consisted of the National Salvation Front, the National Union for Solidarity and Development, the Democratic Party for National Union and the Union of Forces of Progress. It received 1.5% of the vote, winning a single seat. The seat was taken by National Union for Solidarity and Development leader Adolphe Biaou.

The alliance was reformed under the leadership of Francis da Silva to contest the 2015 parliamentary elections. However, it failed to win a seat.
