= Luc Gnacadja =

Beninese politician

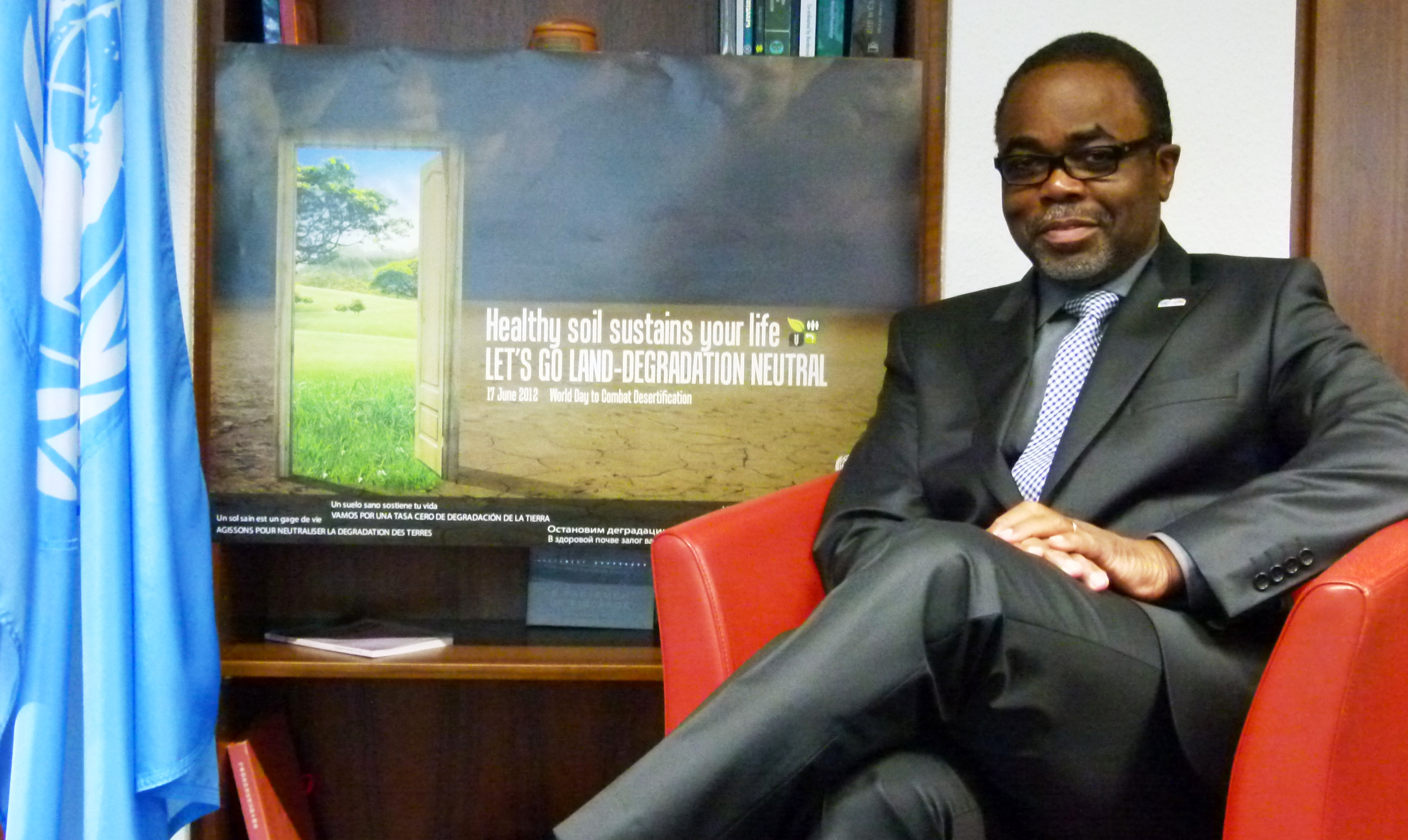
- Gnacadja in 2013

2nd UNCCD Executive Secretary
- In office 1 October 2007 – 30 September 2013
- Preceded by: Hama Arba Diallo
- Succeeded by: Monique Barbut

Minister of the Environment, Housing, and Urban Planning of Benin
- In office June 1999 – February 2005

Personal details
- Born: 19 October 1958 (age 68) Porto-Novo, Benin
- Party: Envol
- Occupation: Architect

Luc-Marie Constant Gnacadja or simply Luc Gnacadja (born 19 October 1958) is a Beninese politician and architect. He was Executive Secretary of the United Nations Convention to Combat Desertification from 2007 to 2013.

== Political career ==
Gnacadja served in the government of Benin as Minister of the Environment, Housing, and Urban Planning from June 1999 to February 2005 under long-time President Mathieu Kérékou. Due to major political changes taking place since 2005, particularly with President Kérékou barred from running again by a two-term limit and an age limit of 70 years for candidates, Gnacadja ran for president as the unique candidate of the Envol movement in the March 2006 presidential election, receiving 11th place and 0.68% of the vote in the first round.

== United Nations career ==
In terms of ministerial authority, Luc Gnacadja represented Benin as the head of delegation to the UNCCD and at the UN Framework Convention on Climate Change (UNFCCC) and Convention on Biological Diversity (CBD) while serving as Minister.

In September 2007, Luc Gnacadja was appointed as Executive Secretary of the United Nations Convention to Combat Desertification (UNCCD) by United Nations Secretary-General Ban Ki-moon, after he was endorsed by the Bureau of the Conference of the Parties of the UNCCD. In applying for the position, Gnacadja was said to have been backed by Beninese President Yayi Boni. Gnacadja's second term concluded at the end of September 2013.

Since he first took office in 2007, he managed to effectively address the UNCCD's lack of scientific basis. His vision of the UNCCD process was based on moving the Convention towards effective implementation through evidence-based policymaking, target setting and monitoring of implementation by means of agreeing a strong and globally trusted set of impacts and progress indicators by the scientific community; so as to build a strong and authoritative science and policy interface for the Convention. Accordingly, the Conference of the Parties (COP) at its eighth session in 2007 decided that future sessions of the Committee on Science and Technology (CST) shall be organized in a predominantly scientific and technical conference-style format and focus on a specific thematic topic relevant to the implementation of The ten-year Strategy to enhance the implementation of the Convention (2008-2018), to be determined in advance by the COP The UNCCD 3rd Scientific Conference on “Combating Desertification, Land Degrdation and Drought (DLDD) for poverty reduction and sustainable development: the contribution of science, technology, traditional knowledge and practices” (decision 18/COP.10) is expected to be held in March 2015 in Mexico.

== Key issues ==
In 1992, the first Earth Summit held in Rio agreed to combat land degradation. Under Gnacadja's direction, Rio+20 held in 2012 witnessed the birth of a new paradigm: "land degradation neutrality" meant to reduce land degradation to the minimum level close to the unavoidable degradation by means of prevention while at the same time restoring degraded areas whenever possible by means of sustainable land management (SLM). In this respect, one of his main interests include a priority focus on Land and Soil in the Global Sustainability Agenda.

Gnacadja was a guiding voice for sustainable land development in the negotiations leading up to Rio+20, the June 2012 UN Conference on Sustainable Development. His personal efforts to promote adoption of an international commitment to a “land degradation–neutral world” was deemed a critical step forward according to The expert committee overseeing the Cook Prize for Desert Architecture led by Prof. David Perlmutter, chair of the Bona Terra Department of Man in the Desert at the BIDR.

== Education and awards ==
Luc Gnacadja earned an architecture degree at the African Crafts School of Architecture and Urbanism in Lomé, Togo, and later studied at Harvard University's Kennedy School of Government and the World Bank Institute.

In March 2003, Gnacadja was awarded the Green Award 2002 by the World Bank in Washington. for promoting environment-friendly public expenditure reform in Benin.

On 17 November 2014, Gnacadja was awarded the Jeffery Cook Prize in Desert Architecture at the International Drylands, Deserts and Desertification Conference organized by Ben-Gurion University of the Negev's Blaustein Institutes for Desert Research (BIDR).

== Other activities ==
Gnacadja is an honorary councillor of The World Future Council (WFC) launched in 2007 in Hamburg, Germany, by Jakob von Uexkull. The WFC is an international Foundation consisting of some eminent global personalities who promote change by advocating at the highest levels for a sustainable, just and peaceful future and providing decision-makers with practical solutions to the global challenges facing future generations.
