= 1945 French constitutional referendum in Gabon–Moyen Congo =

A constitutional referendum was held in French Gabon and Moyen Congo on 21 October 1945 as part of the wider French constitutional referendum. Both questions were approved by large margins. Voter turnout was 68.1%.

== Results ==
=== Question I ===
Do you agree that the assembly now elected will serve as a constituent assembly?

Choice	Votes	%
For	2,523	95.6
Against	115	4.4
Invalid/blank votes	197	–
Total	2,835	100
Registered voters/turnout	4,164	68.1
Source: Sternberger et al.

=== Question II ===
Do you agree that until the enforcement of a new Constitution, public affairs will be organised according to the proposal of the law which you find reproduced on the rear of the ballot?

Choice	Votes	%
For	2,343	89.3
Against	280	10.7
Invalid/blank votes	212	–
Total	2,835	100
Registered voters/turnout	4,164	68.1
Source: Sternberger et al.
