= Rally for Democracy and Progress (Benin) =

Political party in Benin

The Rally for Democracy and Progress (French: Rassemblement pour la Démocratie et le Progrès, RDP) is a political party in Benin.

== History ==
The party was established in 1995 as the Rally for Democracy and Pan-Africanism (Rassemblement pour la Démocratie et le Panafricanisme, RDP), and was led by Dominique Houngninou. In the parliamentary elections that year it received 1.4% of the vote, winning one seat, taken by Houngninou. In the 1999 elections its vote share fell to 0.9%, but Houngninou retained his seat.

By the 2003 elections it had become the Rally for Democracy and Progress. It joined the Presidential Movement (MP), with Houngninou again retaining his seat as the MP won a total of 52 seats.
