= Democratic Movement =

Democratic Movement may refer to:

- Brazilian Democratic Movement
- Democratic Movement (France)
- Democratic Movement (Israel)
- Democratic Movement (Italy)
- Democratic Italian Movement
- Democratic Movement (San Marino)
- Democratic Movement of Kyrgyzstan

== See also ==
- Movement for Democracy (disambiguation)
