= 1945 French constitutional referendum in Guinea =

A constitutional referendum was held in Guinea on 21 October 1945 as part of the wider French constitutional referendum. Both questions were approved by large margins. Voter turnout was 73.5%.

== Results ==
=== Question I ===
Do you agree that the assembly now elected will serve as a constituent assembly?

Choice	Votes	%
For	1,318	98.1
Against	26	1.9
Invalid/blank votes	85	–
Total	1,429	100
Registered voters/turnout	1,944	73.5
Source: Sternberger et al.

=== Question II ===
Do you agree that until the enforcement of a new Constitution, public affairs will be organised according to the proposal of the law which you find reproduced on the rear of the ballot?

Choice	Votes	%
For	1,090	81.8
Against	243	18.2
Invalid/blank votes	96	–
Total	1,429	100
Registered voters/turnout	1,944	73.5
Source: Sternberger et al.
