= 1945 French constitutional referendum in Chad–Ubangi-Shari =

A constitutional referendum was held in Chad and Ubangi-Shari on 21 October 1945 as part of the wider French constitutional referendum. Both questions were approved by large margins. Voter turnout was 68%.

== Results ==
=== Question I ===
Do you agree that the assembly now elected will serve as a constituent assembly?

Choice	Votes	%
For	2,523	95.64
Against	115	4.36
Total	2,638	100.00
Valid votes	2,638	93.05
Invalid/blank votes	197	6.95
Total votes	2,835	100.00
Registered voters/turnout	4,164	68.08
Source: Sternberger et al.

=== Question II ===
Do you agree that until the enforcement of a new Constitution, public affairs will be organised according to the proposal of the law which you find reproduced on the rear of the ballot?

Choice	Votes	%
For	2,343	89.33
Against	280	10.67
Total	2,623	100.00
Valid votes	2,623	92.52
Invalid/blank votes	212	7.48
Total votes	2,835	100.00
Registered voters/turnout	4,164	68.08
Source: Sternberger et al.
