= Suru Alliance =

The Suru Alliance (French: Alliance Suru, AS) was a political alliance in Benin.

== History ==
The alliance was established in 1999, to contest the parliamentary elections that year, and consisted of the Union for Democracy and National Reconstruction, the Forum for Democracy, Development and Morality, the Union for Homeland and Progress and the National Forum of Civil and Civic Awakening. It received 1.5% of the vote, winning a single seat taken by Gado Girigissou.
