= African Rally for Progress and National Solidarity =

Political party in Benin

The African Rally for Progress and National Solidarity (French: Rassemblement Africain pour le Progrès et la Solidarité Nationale, RAP) was a political party in Benin.

== History ==
The party contested the 1995 parliamentary elections as part of the informal Presidential Tendency alliance, which supported President Nicéphore Soglo. It received 2.6% of the vote, winning a single seat, taken by Rigobert Ladikpo.
