= Movement for the People's Alternative =

Political party in Benin

The Movement for the People's Alternative (Mouvement pour une Alternative du Peuple), commonly appreviated as MAP, is a political party of Benin led by Lazare Sèhouéto.

== History ==
The party was founded by Lazare Sèhouéto in December 1988 at the age of 25. He represented the MAP during the conference of the living forces of the nation in February 1990. Prior to the 2003 parliamentary election, the MAP joined the Key Force alliance along with the 30th April Movement and several individual political leaders. As a member of the Key Force, the MAP joined the Presidential Movement, a group of supporters of President Mathieu Kérékou. The movement won 5 out of 83 seats in the 2003 Beninese parliamentary election.

While Sèhouéto was Minister of Agriculture from 2004 to 2005, the MAP protested against attempts to alter the Beninese Constitution, working to keep President Kérékou as the head of state. At the 2006 presidential election, the party won 2.04% of the votes for its candidate Lazare Sèhouéto. According to a 2012 La Nouvelle Tribune Column, Sèhouéto endorsed his opponent Boni Yayi. In 2007, the Key Force won 4 seats in parliament, including Sèhouéto. That same year, Key Force joined the left-wing Union Makes the Nation (UN), an opposition alliance of progressive and socially democratic parties against then-president Thomas Boni Yayi, which failed to prevent his re-election. This alliance won 30 seats in the 2011 parliamentary elections, and 13 seats in 2015, none of which belonged to the MAP. Due to the reformation of Benin's partisan system in 2016, UN merged with multiple other political groups to form the Progressive Union in 2018, thus dissolving the UN. In 2022, the Progressive Union joined the Democratic Renewal Party, creating the Progressive Union Renewal (UPR). While not formally defunct, the MAP has remained unrepresented since Sèhouéto's term ended in 2011.
