= 1945 French constitutional referendum in Ivory Coast =

A constitutional referendum was held in Ivory Coast (which included Upper Volta at the time) on 21 October 1945 as part of the wider French constitutional referendum. Both questions were approved by large margins. Voter turnout was 74.9%.

== Results ==
=== Question I ===
Do you agree that the assembly now elected will serve as a constituent assembly?

Choice	Votes	%
For	2,420	92.6
Against	194	7.4
Invalid/blank votes	116	–
Total	2,730	100
Registered voters/turnout	3,646	74.9
Source: Sternberger et al.

=== Question II ===
Do you agree that until the enforcement of a new Constitution, public affairs will be organised according to the proposal of the law which you find reproduced on the rear of the ballot?

Choice	Votes	%
For	1,782	68.7
Against	812	31.3
Invalid/blank votes	136	–
Total	2,730	100
Registered voters/turnout	3,646	74.9
Source: Sternberger et al.
