= Joseph Keke =

Beninese politician

Joseph Adjignon Keke (5 December 1927 – 1 July 2017) was a Beninese politician.

Joseph Adjignon Keke was officially born on 5 December 1927 in Avrankou. He earned a degree in law and was an engineer in farming techniques. He flew back to Dahomey in 1956 and soon became Sourou-Migan Apithy's prime lieutenant. He was elected a deputy in 1959, representing the Parti Républicain Dahoméen, and became the party's vice president until 1960. He had been appointed minister of justice in Hubert Maga's first administration, serving from November 1960 to 1963. He was deposed as a minister in the 1963 coup. With the creation of the Presidential Council in 1970, Hubert Maga appointed Adjignon Keke Joseph minister of economics and planning. He served in this role until 1973 when he was deposed in another coup

Adjignon Keke Joseph practiced law in Cotonou during Mathieu Kérékou's military rule. In 1990, with the return to civilian politics, he made his political return as a party leader since Apithy had died the previous year. He joined with Justin Ahomadégbé-Tomêtin to form the Rassemblement National pour la Democratie. Keke was elected to the Beninese National Assembly. Despite being Nicephore Soglo's choice as speaker, he did not attain that position. Keke died on 1 July 2017, supposedly aged 89.
