= Gatien Houngbédji =

Beninese politician

Gatien Houngbédji (born December 18, 1949) is a Beninese politician and the president of the Union for Economic and Social Development (UDES). Under President Mathieu Kérékou, he was Minister of Trade, Craft Industry, and Tourism from April 1996 to May 1998. He unsuccessfully ran for the office of President of Benin as the candidate of UDES in the March 1991 presidential election, in which he received 0.89% of the vote (11th place). He also ran as the UDES candidate in the March 2001 presidential election, in which he received 0.33% of the vote (14th place). In January 2006, he was again designated as the UDES candidate for the March 2006 presidential election; in this election he received 0.22% of the vote (21st place).
