= Zul Kifl Salami =

Beninese politician

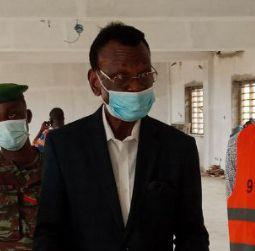
Zul Kifl Salami

Zul Kifl Salami is a politician from Benin. He was a minister in the PRPB government. He holds a doctorate in economics.

He was elected as an Islamic Development Bank Executive Director in 2003 on a three-year term, with responsibility for: Algeria, Benin, Mozambique, Syria, Palestine and Yemen.

On February 4, 2005 he was appointed Minister of State in charge of Planning and Development in the new cabinet of Mathieu Kérékou. He held the position until April 2006.

Salami stood as an independent candidate in the 2006 presidential election. He received 8,538 votes (0.28%).

He is the chairman of the Banque Islamique du Bénin.
