= Jean-Baptiste Hachème =

Beninese military officer and politician (1929–1998)

Chairman of the Revolutionary Committee
- In office December 17, 1967 – December 20, 1967
- Preceded by: Christophe Soglo (as president)
- Succeeded by: Maurice Kouandété

Personal details
- Born: June 24, 1929 Porto-Novo, Dahomey
- Died: May 3, 1998 (aged 68) Cotonou, Benin
- Occupation: Military officer

Jean-Baptiste Hachème (June 24, 1929 – May 3, 1998) was a Beninese military officer and politician. He was most active when his country was known as Dahomey. Of Fon origins, he entered the national political stage in 1963, when he quelled riots started by supporters of former president Hubert Maga. Henceforth he served under various government positions, including briefly the office of Chairman of the Revolutionary Committee.

He was dismissed from the army twice, mainly due to his residence in the south. Hachème was brought back shortly thereafter on both occasions, being assigned small or largely non-functioning positions. Along with Alphonse Alley and Pascal Chabi Kao, Hachème was accused of planning a coup against President Mathieu Kérékou on February 28, 1973 and was imprisoned with 20 years of hard labor. He was released in 1984.

== Military career ==
Hachème was of Fon origins and was born in Porto Novo. After entering the military, he attained the rank of major. He entered the national political stage in 1963, when he quelled riots trying to bring former president Hubert Maga back into power at his hometown, Parakou. Academic Samuel Decalo described Hachème's crushing of the demonstrations as "brutal".

His rise to power occurred during a period of intense regionalism in Dahomey. They were spurred by the historical resentment shared by members of the former kingdoms of Abomey, Porto Novo, and disorganised tribes from the north. Its result was the creation of three de facto tribal zones: the north, southeast, and southwest. This regionalism permeated into the armed forces, compounded by divisions of officers into cliques based on education. Hachème was a member of what Decalo called the Abomey clique, which also included prominent officers Philippe Aho, Benoit Sinzogan, and Benoit Adandejan.

He was briefly head of the Comite Militare de Vigilance in 1967, which was set up to administer President Christophe Soglo's regime. When Maurice Kouandete seized the presidency later that year, Hachème was appointed chairman of his interim government, the Comite Militaire Revolutionaire, and served as Chairman of the Revolutionary Committee from December 17, 1967 to December 20, 1967. Emile Derlin Zinsou was appointed president in August 1968, and with the act the Comite lost its value and was dismissed.

Hachème, however, did not witness the dissolution of the Comite. Alleged to have plotted against Kouandete and Alphonse Alley, Hachème was expelled from the armed forces in January when many southern soldiers were removed, though was brought back shortly afterwards. In mid-1970, Hachème was chosen to be the chief of staff of the Service Civique, a command whose officers did not see service. The Civique was, rather, more agricultural in nature, and served several other roles. Captain Pierre Kadjo Koffi was named his assistant.

== Later life ==
In October 1972, when Mathieu Kérékou led a coup and seized power, Hachème was again dismissed from the army as well as every other senior officer from the south. He was instead given the post of Commissioner of Dahomey's Ceramic Crafts (SONAC), a role with very little responsibility. Along with Alley and Pascal Chabi Kao, Hachème was accused of planning a coup against Kérékou on February 28, 1973 and was imprisoned with 20 years of hard labor. Hachème was released on amnesty on August 1, 1984, as well as all other political detainees besides those involved in the "ignoble and barbarous imperialist armed aggression of Sunday, January 17, 1977."

== Bibliography ==
- Decalo, Samuel (April 1973), "Regionalism, Politics, and the Military in Dahomey", The Journal of Developing Areas, 7 (3), College of Business, Tennessee State University: 449–478, JSTOR 4190033.
- Decalo, Samuel (1976), Historical Dictionary of Dahomey (People's Republic of Benin), Metuchen, New Jersey: Scarecrow Press, ISBN 0-8108-0833-1, OCLC 1959674.
- Dossou-Yovo, Noel (September 1999), "The Experience of Benin", International Journal on World Peace, 16 (3), ISSN 0742-3640, OCLC 211426384, archived from the original on September 16, 2010 – via Questia.
- Ronen, Dov (1975), Dahomey: Between Tradition and Modernity, Ithaca, New York: Cornell University Press, ISBN 0-8014-0927-6, OCLC 1527290.
