= Edgar Yves Monnou =

Beninese politician (1953–2025)

Edgar Yves Monnou (9 February 1953 – 4 April 2025) was a Beninese politician. He was the foreign minister of Benin from 1995 to 1996.

Monnou died on 4 April 2025, at the age of 72. He was the father of the French humorist Edgar-Yves Monnou Junior.

Political offices
Preceded by Robert Dossou	Foreign Minister of Benin; 1995–1996	Succeeded by Pierre Osho
