= Movement for Democracy =

Movement for Democracy can refer to several political parties:

- Movement for Democracy (Cape Verde)
- Movement for Democracy (Greece)
- Movement for Democracy (Slovakia)
- The Network (political party), AKA Movement for Democracy – The Network, Italy

== See also ==
- Democratic Movement (disambiguation)
- Movement for Democracy and Independence, Central African Republic
- Movement for Democracy and Development (disambiguation)
