= National Salvation Front (Benin) =

The National Salvation Front (French: Front National du Salut) was a political party in Benin.

== History ==
The FNS joined the Chameleon Alliance to contest the 1995 parliamentary elections. The alliance received 1.5% of the vote, winning a single seat.

Prior to the 1999 elections the party joined the UDES Alliance alongside the Democratic Union for Economic and Social Development, the Bloc for Social Democracy, the MCP and CND. The alliance failed to win a seat after receiving 0.8% of the vote.
