= 1945 French constitutional referendum in Dahomey and Togo =

A constitutional referendum was held in French Dahomey and French Togoland on 21 October 1945 as part of the wider French constitutional referendum. In the two territories both questions were approved by large margins. Voter turnout was 84%.

== Results ==
=== Question I ===
Do you agree that the assembly now elected will serve as a constituent assembly?

Choice	Votes	%
For	1,006	97.39
Against	27	2.61
Total	1,033	100.00
Valid votes	1,033	96.72
Invalid/blank votes	35	3.28
Total votes	1,068	100.00
Registered voters/turnout	1,279	83.50
Source: Sternberger et al.

=== Question II ===
Do you agree that until the enforcement of a new Constitution, public affairs will be organised according to the proposal of the law which you find reproduced on the rear of the ballot?

Choice	Votes	%
For	945	91.93
Against	83	8.07
Total	1,028	100.00
Valid votes	1,028	96.25
Invalid/blank votes	40	3.75
Total votes	1,068	100.00
Registered voters/turnout	1,279	83.50
Source: Sternberger et al.
