= Michel Toko =

Beninese politician

Michel Bamènou Toko

Minister of Justice
- In office 1970–1972

Acting Minister of Foreign Affairs
- In office 31 May 1972 – 1972

Personal details
- Born: 1926-1927
- Died: 17 August 2020 (aged 93)

Michel Bamènou Toko was a Beninese politician who served as Minister of Justice and Acting Minister of Foreign Affairs in the 1970s.

== Biography ==
Born in 1926 or 1927 he was originally from Mono Department.

In the early 1960s Toko was active in the Congolese Youth Union (UJC) and the Confédération générale aéfienne du travail (CGAT) in Brazzaville and was subsequently deported to Dahomey by French authorities as part of drives to suppress communist influence.

In 1970 he was appointed Minister for Justice and on 31 May 1972 he was appointed Acting Minister for Foreign Affairs. During the presidency of Mathieu Kérékou he was imprisoned along with many other former politicians.

Following Benin's transition to multiparty democracy in 1990, Toko led the People's Republican Union. The party contested the 1991 parliamentary election in coalition with the National Labour Party winning one seat and 2% of the vote.

Toko died on 17 August 2020 after a long illness.
