= Union of Forces of Progress (Benin) =

Former political party in Benin

Union of Forces of Progress Union des Forces du Progrès
- Abbreviation: UFP
- Leader: Machioudi Dissou
- Founded: 30 April 1990
- Preceded by: PRPB
- National affiliation: Chameleon Alliance

The Union of Forces of Progress (French: Union des Forces du Progrès, UFP) was a political party in Benin.

== History ==
The party was established on 30 April 1990 as a successor to the People's Revolutionary Party of Benin. It was initially led by Machioudi Dissou.

Although it did not contest the 1991 elections, it joined the Chameleon Alliance for the 1995 elections. The alliance received 1.5% of the vote, winning a single seat.
