= Our Common Cause =

Political party in Benin

Our Common Cause (French: Notre Cause Commune, NCC) is a political party in Benin led by Didier Dahounto.

== History ==
The NCC was established by Albert Teveodjré after he was expelled from the National Rally for Democracy for prematurely declaring his candidacy for the March 1991 presidential elections. It gained support from Catholics, and won six of the 64 seats in the February 1991 parliamentary elections. In the presidential elections Teveodjré finished third with 14% of the vote.

The party was reduced to three seats in the 1995 elections, with Teveodjré, Soumanou Arouna and Denis Adanklounon representing the party in the National Assembly. The party split in 1997 when Teveodjré was expelled and established the National Party "Together". François Tankpinou replaced Teveodjré as party leader. It subsequently lost all three seats in the 1999 elections.
