= Movement for Development by Culture =

Political party in Benin

The Movement for Development by Culture (French: Mouvement pour le Développement par la Culture) is a political party in Benin. At the legislative elections, 30 March 2003, the party was member of the Presidential Movement, the alliance of supporters of Mathieu Kérékou, who had won the 2001 presidential elections. It took part in a combined list of the Movement for Development by Culture, the Party of Salvation and the Congress of People for Progress, that won two out of 83 seats.
