= Coalition for an Emerging Benin =

Political party in Benin

The Coalition for an Emerging Benin (Coalition pour un Bénin Emergent) is a political party of Benin. In the parliamentary election held on 31 March 2007, the party won two out of 83 seats.
