= National Party "Together" =

Political party in Benin

National Party "Together" (French: Parti National Ensemble) is a political party in Benin led by Albert Teveodjré. PNE was formed following a split in Our Common Cause (NCC).

PNE was legally recognized on August 11, 1998.

PNE maintains relations with conservative and Christian Democratic groups abroad. In 2002, it received a grant from the Konrad Adenauer Foundation (linked to German CDU) to organize a youth camp.
