= Hope Force =

Political party in Benin

The Hope Force (Force Espoir) is a political party of Benin led by Antoine Dayori. In the presidential election held on 5 March 2006, the party won 1.25% of the votes for its candidate, Antoine Dayori. In the parliamentary election held on 31 March 2007, the party won two out of 83 seats.
