= Alliance of the Forces of Progress (Benin) =

Political party in Benin

The Alliance of Progress Forces (French: Alliance des Forces du Progrès) is a political party in Benin.

In the parliamentary election held on 30 March 2003, the party was part of the Presidential Movement, the alliance of supporters of Mathieu Kérékou (who had won the 2001 presidential election), and won one out of 83 seats. In the parliamentary election held on 31 March 2007, the party won one out of 83 seats.
