= 1999 Beninese parliamentary election =

- 30 March 1999
- All 83 seats in the National Assembly; 42 seats needed for a majority
- Turnout: 71.87%
Party	Leader	Vote %	Seats	+/–
RB	Rosine Vieyra Soglo	20.40	27	+6
PRD	Adrien Houngbédji	11.59	11	−8
PSD	Bruno Amoussou	8.77	9	+1
MADEP	Sefou Fagbohoun	8.74	6	New
FARD-Alafia	Jerome Sacca Kina Guezere	5.23	10	0
Star Alliance		3.99	4	−1
PNE	Albert Tévoédjrè	3.75	1	New
CAR-Dunya		3.33	3	New
MERCI		2.98	2	New
PS		2.30	1	+1
RPR–UNSD		2.24	1	
IPD	Théophile Nata	2.05	4	+1
PDB	Soulé Dankoro	1.91	1	New
Suru Alliance		1.48	1	
RUND		1.35	1	New
RDP	Dominique Houngninou	0.91	1	+1
This lists parties that won seats. See the complete results below.

Parliamentary elections were held in Benin on 30 March 1999. The Benin Rebirth Party retained its status as the largest party in the National Assembly, increasing its number of seats from 21 to 27, whilst the Democratic Renewal Party won only 11 seats, a reduction of eight.

== Results ==
Party	Votes	%	Seats	+/–
Benin Rebirth Party	383,487	20.40	27	+6
Democratic Renewal Party	217,816	11.59	11	–8
Social Democratic Party	164,767	8.77	9	+1
African Movement for Development and Progress	164,293	8.74	6	New
Action Front for Renewal and Development	98,248	5.23	10	0
Star Alliance	75,003	3.99	4	–1
National Party "Together"	70,403	3.75	1	New
African Congress for Renewal	62,667	3.33	3	New
Movement for Citizens' Commitment and Awakening	56,049	2.98	2	New
Fraternity Alliance	49,342	2.63	0	New
Alliance for Progress	43,291	2.30	0	New
Party of Salvation	43,240	2.30	1	+1
RPR–UNSD	42,191	2.24	1	–
National Rally for Democracy	41,008	2.18	0	0
Impulse for Progress and Development	38,513	2.05	4	+1
Democratic Party of Benin	35,900	1.91	1	New
Republican Alliance (ADD–NGR–NEP)	28,614	1.52	0	–1
Suru Alliance	27,739	1.48	1	–
Rally for National Unity and Democracy	25,373	1.35	1	New
Movement for the People's Alternative	24,949	1.33	0	New
Alliance for Democracy and Progress	20,272	1.08	0	–1
National Campaign for Morality and Democracy	18,882	1.00	0	New
Communist Party of Benin	18,669	0.99	0	–1
Rally for Democracy and Pan-Africanism	17,084	0.91	1	0
Union of the Triumph of the Republic	16,220	0.86	0	New
Our Common Cause	15,533	0.83	0	–3
UDES Alliance (MCP–BSD–CND–UDES–FNS)	14,449	0.77	0	New
Union for Patriotism and Labour	13,356	0.71	0	New
Congress of People for Progress	12,603	0.67	0	New
Socialist Party	9,658	0.51	0	New
People's Republican Union	7,130	0.38	0	New
African Party for Redemption and Independence	7,001	0.37	0	New
Alliance of the Patriots (CAD–RDL–PNT–USD–RCV–PNPD)	6,156	0.33	0	0
Le Berler Social Democratic Party	4,821	0.26	0	New
Front for the Republic	4,784	0.25	0	New
Total	1,879,511	100.00	83	0
Valid votes	1,879,511	94.43		
Invalid/blank votes	110,884	5.57		
Total votes	1,990,395	100.00		
Registered voters/turnout	2,769,323	71.87		
Source: Dissou, Fleischhacker
