= 1945 French constitutional referendum =

Referendum held in France on 21 October 1945

A constitutional referendum was held in France on 21 October 1945. Voters were asked whether they approved of the Assembly elected on the same day serving as a Constituent Assembly, and whether until a new constitution was approved, the country would be governed according to a proposed set of laws that appeared on the ballot paper. If the first proposal had not been approved, the Third Republic would have been restored, but its approval led to the elected Assembly drafting a constitution and proposing it to the people a year later, resulting in the creation of the Fourth Republic. Both were approved by wide margins with a turnout of 79.8%.

== Results ==
=== Question I ===
Do you agree that the assembly now elected will serve as a constituent assembly?

Choice	Metropolitan France		Total	
Choice	Votes	%	Votes	%
For	17,957,868	96.4	18,584,746	96.4
Against	670,672	3.6	699,136	3.6
Invalid/blank votes	1,025,744	–	1,070,103	–
Total	19,654,284	100	20,353,985	100
Source: Nohlen & Stöver

=== Question II ===
Do you agree that until the enforcement of a new Constitution, public affairs will be organised according to the proposal of the law which you find reproduced on the rear of the ballot?

Choice	Metropolitan France		Total	
Choice	Votes	%	Votes	%
For	12,317,882	66.5	12,794,943	66.5
Against	6,217,512	33.5	6,449,206	33.5
Invalid/blank votes	1,064,890	–	1,109,836	–
Total	19,645,284	100	20,353,985	100
Source: Nohlen & Stöver

== See also ==
- 1945 French constitutional referendum in Algeria
- 1945 French constitutional referendum in Cameroon
- 1945 French constitutional referendum in Chad–Ubangi-Shari
- 1945 French constitutional referendum in Dahomey and Togo
- 1945 French constitutional referendum in French Somaliland
- 1945 French constitutional referendum in French Sudan−Niger
- 1945 French constitutional referendum in Gabon–Moyen Congo
- 1945 French constitutional referendum in Guinea
- 1945 French constitutional referendum in Ivory Coast
- 1945 French constitutional referendum in Mauritania−Senegal
- 1945 French constitutional referendum in Tunisia
