= 1968 Dahomeyan constitutional referendum =

31 March 1968

Results
Choice	Votes	%
Yes	847,212	92.21%
No	71,617	7.79%
Valid votes	918,829	99.65%
Invalid or blank votes	3,221	0.35%
Total votes	922,050	100.00%
Registered voters/turnout	1,126,155	81.88%

A constitutional referendum was held in the Republic of Dahomey on 31 March 1968. As with the 1964 referendum, the main issues were changing the system of government to a presidential system, scrapping term limits for the president, and having a unicameral parliament. The referendum passed with 92% of voters approving the changes. Turnout was 82% of the 1,126,155 registered voters.

== Results ==
Choice	Votes	%
For	847,212	92.21
Against	71,617	7.79
Total	918,829	100.00
Valid votes	918,829	99.65
Invalid/blank votes	3,221	0.35
Total votes	922,050	100.00
Registered voters/turnout	1,126,155	81.88
Source: Nohlen et al.
