= Alliance for Revival =

Political party in Benin

The Alliance for Revival (Alliance Le Réveil) is a political party of Benin. In the parliamentary election held on 31 March 2007, the party won two out of 83 seats.
