= Key Force =

The Key Force (French: Force clé) was a political alliance in Benin.

== History ==
The alliance was formed prior to the 2003 parliamentary election, and consisted of the Movement for the People's Alternative, the 30th April Movement and some other political leaders. It joined the Presidential Movement, an alliance of supporters of Mathieu Kérékou, who had won the 2001 presidential elections. The Key Force won five out of 83 seats in the elections.

In the 2007 parliamentary election the alliance won four seats. It joined the Union Makes the Nation alliance for the 2011 elections, with the Union winning 30 seats.
