= Union for Democracy and National Reconstruction =

The Union for Democracy and National Reconstruction (French: Union pour la Démocratie et la Reconstruction Nationale, UDRN) was a political party in Benin led by Azaria Fakorede.

== History ==
The UDRN contested the 1991 elections as part of three-party alliance alongside the National Movement for Democracy and Development (MNDD) and the Movement for Solidarity, Union and Progress (MSUP). The three parties received 8% of the vote and won six of the 64 seats in the National Assembly.

The alliance split prior to the 1995 elections, with the MNDD running alone and the other two remaining in an alliance. Although the MNDD won a single seat with 2% of the vote, the MSUP–UDRN alliance received only 1% of the vote and failed to win a seat. MSUP leader Djamiou attempted to sought to have the election results in Cotonou overturned in the Constitutional Court, but his case was deemed inadmissible.

In the 1999 elections it was part of the Suru Alliance, which won one seat.
