= 1934 Dahomeyan Administrative Council election =

- 1934
- 3 elected seats on the Administrative Council

Administrative Council elections were held in Dahomey in 1934.

== Electoral system ==
Three members of the Administrative Council were elected from single-member constituencies; Abomey, Ouidah and Porto-Novo. However, the franchise was extremely restricted.

== Campaign ==
The councillors supported by La Voix were challenged by an alliance of candidates created by Louis Hunkanrin after he returned from exile in Mauritania. The Hunkanrin group was supported by civil servants, farmers and workers, and allied itself with Augustin Nicoué, who had run against the La Voix group in the 1932 elections. During the campaign they accused the La Voix group of being capitalists and not socialists.

In the Abomey constituency incumbent councillor Augustinho Olympio opted to stand down rather than run for re-election.

== Results ==
The La Voix candidates were beaten in all three constituencies. Richard Johnson, who was elected in Abomey, was the brother of the defeated Pierre Johnson.

Constituency	Elected candidate	Losing candidate(s)
Abomey	Richard Johnson	
Ouidah	Ambroise Dossou-Yovo	Pierre Johnson (La Voix)
Porto-Novo	Augustin Nicoué	Casimir d'Almeida (La Voix)

== Aftermath ==
Following the elections, Casimir d'Almeida attempted to sue his opponents for defamation, but was not successful. However, the administration did successfully prosecute Pierre Johnson and Hunkanrin group associate Blaise Kuassi for the same offence, resulting in a prison sentence.

Soon after the elections Dosso-Yovo and Nicoué changed their stance to one supportive of the administration, with Richard Johnson the only councillor to remain critical of the establishment.
