= Ministry of Economy and Finance (Benin) =

Beninese government ministry

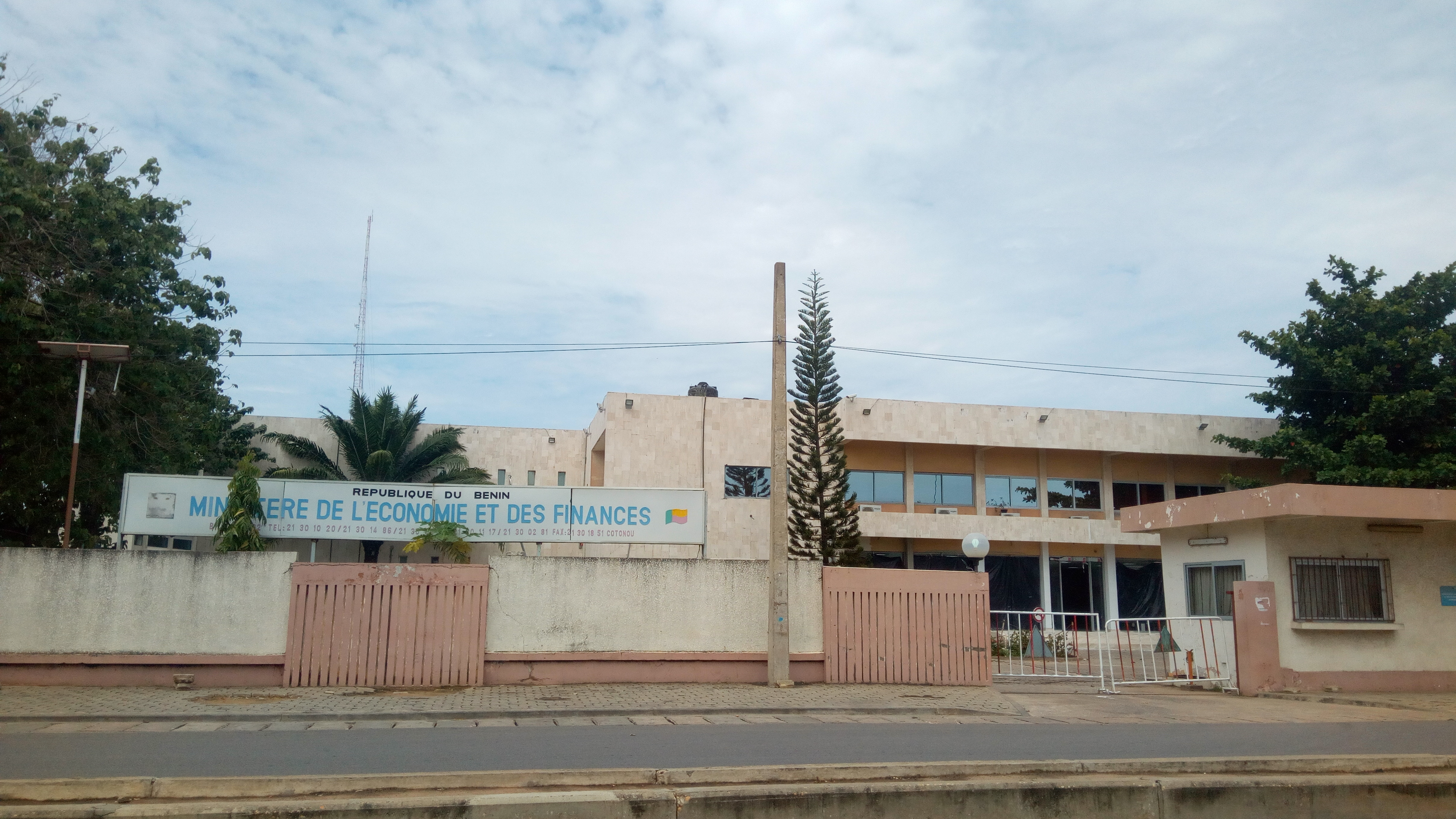
Ministry building in Cotonou

The Ministry of Economy and Finance (French: Ministère de l'Économie et des Finances) is the government ministry responsible for governing and managing the economy and the financial activity of Benin.

The current Minister of Economy and Finance is Aristide Medenou.

== Ministers responsible for finance ==
- François Aplogan, Jan 1960 – Nov 1960
- Sourou-Migan Apithy, November 1960 – December 1960
- Alexandre Adandé, December 1960 – September 1963
- Bertin Borna, September 1963 – October 1963
- Sourou-Migan Apithy, October 1963 – January 1964
- François Aplogan, January 1964–1965
- Antoine Boya, November 1965 – December 1965
- Nicéphore Soglo, December 1965 – December 1966
- Pascal Chabi Kao, December 1967–1968
- Stanislas Yedomon Kpognon, 1968 – December 1969
- Maurice Kouandété, December 1969 – May 1970
- Pascal Chabi Kao, May 1970 – October 1972
- Thomas Lahami, October 1972 – April 1973
- Janvier Codjo Assogba, April 1973 – October 1974
- Isidore Amoussou, October 1974 – August 1984
- Hospice Antonio, August 1984 – February 1987
- Barnabé Bidouzo, February 1987–1988
- Didier Dassi, August 1988–1990
- Idelphonse Lemon, 1990–1991
- Paul Dossou, 1991–1996
- Moïse Mensah, 1996–1998
- Abdoulaye Bio-Tchané, 1998–2002
- Grégoire Laourou, 2002–2005
- Cosme Sèhlin, 2005–2006
- Pascal Koupaki, 2006–2007
- Soulé Mana Lawani, 2007–2009
- Idriss L. Daouda, 2009–2011
- Adidjatou Mathys, 2011–2012
- Jonas A. Gbian, 2012–2014
- Komi Koutché, 2014–2016
- Romuald Wadagni, 2016–2026
- Aristide Medenou, 2026–

== See also ==
- Government of Benin
- Economy of Benin
