= 1928 Dahomeyan Administrative Council election =

- 1928
- 3 elected seats on the Administrative Council

Administrative Council elections were held in Dahomey in 1928.

== Electoral system ==
Three members of the Administrative Council were elected from single-member constituencies; Abomey, Ouidah and Porto-Novo. However, the franchise was extremely restricted.

== Campaign ==
In 1927 the La Voix newspaper was established by political activists in Dahomey. It supported anti-colonial candidates in the elections.

== Results ==
The candidates supported by La Voix won in all three constituencies; Pierre Johnson was re-elected in Ouidah, whilst the pro-French candidates were defeated in the other two constituencies.

Constituency	Elected candidate
Abomey	Augustinho Olympio
Ouidah	Pierre Johnson
Porto-Novo	Casimir d'Almeida
