= Alliance for Democracy and Progress (Benin) =

The Alliance for Democracy and Progress (French: Alliance pour la Démocratie et le Progrès, ADP) was a political party in Benin.

== History ==
The ADP was established in 1990 by Gédéon Dassoundo in order to campaign against the constitutional referendum. However, the proposed changes were approved by 93% of voters.

In the 1991 parliamentary elections the party ran in an alliance with the Democratic Union for Social Renewal (UDRS). The alliance won two seats, with Dassoundo becoming one of its MPs. By 1992 the party was led by Adekpedjou Sylvain Akindes.

The party contested the 1995 parliamentary elections alone, receiving 1.4% of the vote and winning one seat, taken by Antoine Idji Kolawolé. However, it lost its single seat in the 1999 elections.
