= Movement for Development and Solidarity =

Political party in Benin

The Movement for Development and Solidarity (French: Mouvement pour le Développement et la Solidarité) is a political party in Benin. In the legislative elections held on 30 March 2003, the party was a member of the Presidential Movement, the alliance of supporters of Mathieu Kérékou, who had won the 2001 presidential elections, and won one out of 83 seats. It helped form the coalition Union Makes the Nation, the main opposition to President Yayi Boni's government following the 2011 elections.
