= 1925 Dahomeyan Administrative Council election =

- 1925
- 3 elected seats on the Administrative Council

Administrative Council elections were held in Dahomey for the first time in 1925.

== Background ==
The Administrative Council was established in 1894, Although it had no elected members, the Chamber of Commerce selected some of the councillors. However, three elected seats were introduced in 1925.

== Electoral system ==
Three constituencies were created for the elections, Abomey, Ouidah and Porto-Novo. The franchise was extremely restricted, with only 470 people registered to vote.

== Results ==
Two of the three seats were won by candidates supported by the French colonial authorities. However, Pierre Johnson was elected in Ouidah despite opposition from the French.
