= Restore the Hope =

Political party in Benin

Restore the Hope (French: Restaurer l’Espoir) is a political party of Benin. In the parliamentary election held on 31 March 2007, the party won one out of 83 seats.
