= Forum for Democracy, Development and Morality =

Political party in Benin

The Forum for Democracy, Development and Morality (French: Forum pour la Démocratie, le Développement el la Moralité, FDDM) was a political party in Benin.

== History ==
The party contested the 1995 parliamentary elections as part of the "New Generation" alliance with the National Union for Solidarity and Progress. The two parties received 2.4% of the vote, winning two seats. The seats were taken by Souléman Zoumarou and Mamoudou Zoumarou.

In the 1999 elections it was part of the Suru Alliance, which won one seat.
