= Sévérin Adjovi =

Beninese politician

Sévérin Adjovi is a Beninese politician and leader of the Liberal Democrats' Rally for National Reconstruction-Vivoten (RDL-Vivoten), as well as a businessman.

Adjovi was a candidate in the March 1991 presidential election, receiving seventh place and 2.61% of the vote. He was Minister of Defense from 1996 to 1998, Minister of Culture and Communication from 1998 to 1999, and Minister of Trade, Crafts, and Tourism from 1999 to 2001. Adjovi ran in the December 2002 municipal election in Cotonou, Benin's largest city, as a candidate of the pro-government Movement, but he was defeated by former President Nicéphore Soglo in the election for Cotonou's 12th arrondissement. He congratulated Soglo on his victory.

On January 14, 2006, he was designated as the RDL-Vivoten candidate for the March 2006 presidential election. In the election, he took seventh place with 1.78% of the vote.
