= New Alliance (Benin) =

The New Alliance (French: Nouvelle Alliance) was a political alliance in Benin.

== History ==
The Alliance was formed prior to the 2003 elections as an alliance of the Democratic Party of Benin and the Union for Progress and Democracy. Part of the opposition coalition, the Alliance won two seats.
