= 1932 Dahomeyan Administrative Council election =

- 1932
- 3 elected seats on the Administrative Council

Administrative Council elections were held in Dahomey in 1932.

== Electoral system ==
Three members of the Administrative Council were elected from single-member constituencies; Abomey, Ouidah and Porto-Novo. However, the franchise was extremely restricted.

== Campaign ==
In Porto-Novo, Augustin Nicoué campaigned against the school enrollment restrictions. He had previously been close to the councillors supported by La Voix, but became an ardent critic of the city's Administrative Council member, Casimir d'Almeida.

== Results ==
Despite Nicoué's campaign, Casimir d'Almeida was re-elected.

| Constituency | Elected candidate |
|---|---|
| Abomey | Augustinho Olympio |
| Ouidah | Pierre Johnson |
| Porto-Novo | Casimir d'Almeida |
