= Alliance for Democracy and Development (Benin) =

The Alliance for Democracy and Development (French: Alliance pour la Démocratie et le Développement, ADD) was a political party in Benin.

== History ==
The party contested the 1995 parliamentary elections, in which it received 2.5% of the vote, winning a single seat, taken by Karim Dramane. Prior to the 1999 elections it joined the Republican Alliance alongside the New Generation for the Republic and New Impetus for Progress. However, the alliance failed to win a seat.
