= 1990 Beninese constitutional referendum =

A constitutional referendum was held in Benin on 2 December 1990. The main issues were changing the political system to a multi-party system, with a secondary issue as to whether there should be age limits for the President. The referendum passed with 93% of voters approving the change to a multi-party system and 73% in favour of age limits.

== Results ==
Choice		Votes	%
For	With age limits	926,860	73.29
For	Without age limits	252,064	19.93
For	Total	1,178,924	93.22
Against		85,717	6.78
Total		1,264,641	100.00
Valid votes		1,264,641	96.92
Invalid/blank votes		40,229	3.08
Total votes		1,304,870	100.00
Registered voters/turnout		2,052,105	63.59
Source: African Elections Database
