= Moïse Mensah =

Beninese politician (1934–2019)

Moïse Christophe Mensah
- Born: 22 March 1934; Sassandra, Côte d'Ivoire, West Africa
- Died: 2 July 2019 (aged 85)
- Occupations: Politician, international administrator

Moïse Christophe Mensah (22 March 1934 – 2 July 2019) was a Beninese politician and international administrator.

He was born on 22 March 1934 in Sassandra, Ivory Coast and received an education as an agricultural engineer at The Hague's Institute of Social Studies. Later, he studied at the School of Banking in Paris. He was minister of rural development and cooperation from December 1965 to December 1966, simultaneously serving as leader of the Societe Nationale pour le Developpement Rural. After President Christophe Soglo displayed a bias for northerners, Mensah opted to resign his post and traveled abroad. He became a regional representative of the United Nations Food and Agriculture Organization in 1967, and became its assistant director-general in Africa three years later. Mensah became assistant president of the International Fund for Agricultural Development in 1978. He ran for director-general of the Food and Agriculture Organization in 1987, but lost to Edouard Saouma.

Benin experienced a political liberalization in 1991, and Mensah opted to run for president that year on the Alliance pour le Renouveau Civique party. In the first round, he received 39,984 votes, or 3.4%. He became Minister of Finance in 1996 under Mathieu Kerekou. In 2008, President Boni Yayi appointed Mensah to lead the High Commission for Concerted Governance. He was on the board of directors of the Alliance for a Green Revolution in Africa.
