= 2006 Beninese presidential election =

Election of Thomas Boni Yayi

- 5 March 2006 (first round); 19 March 2006 (second round)
- Turnout: 81.40% (first round); 69.47% (second round)
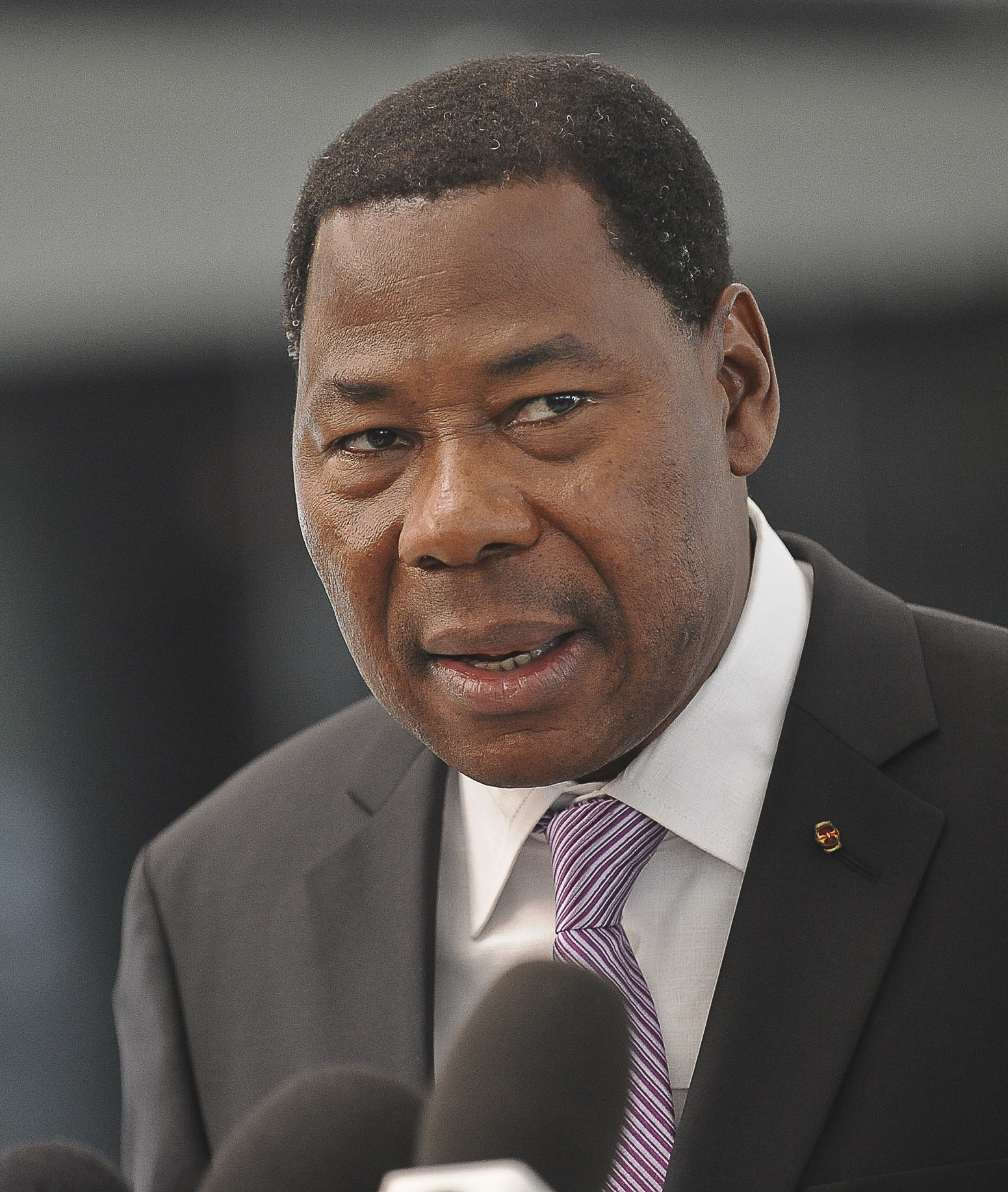

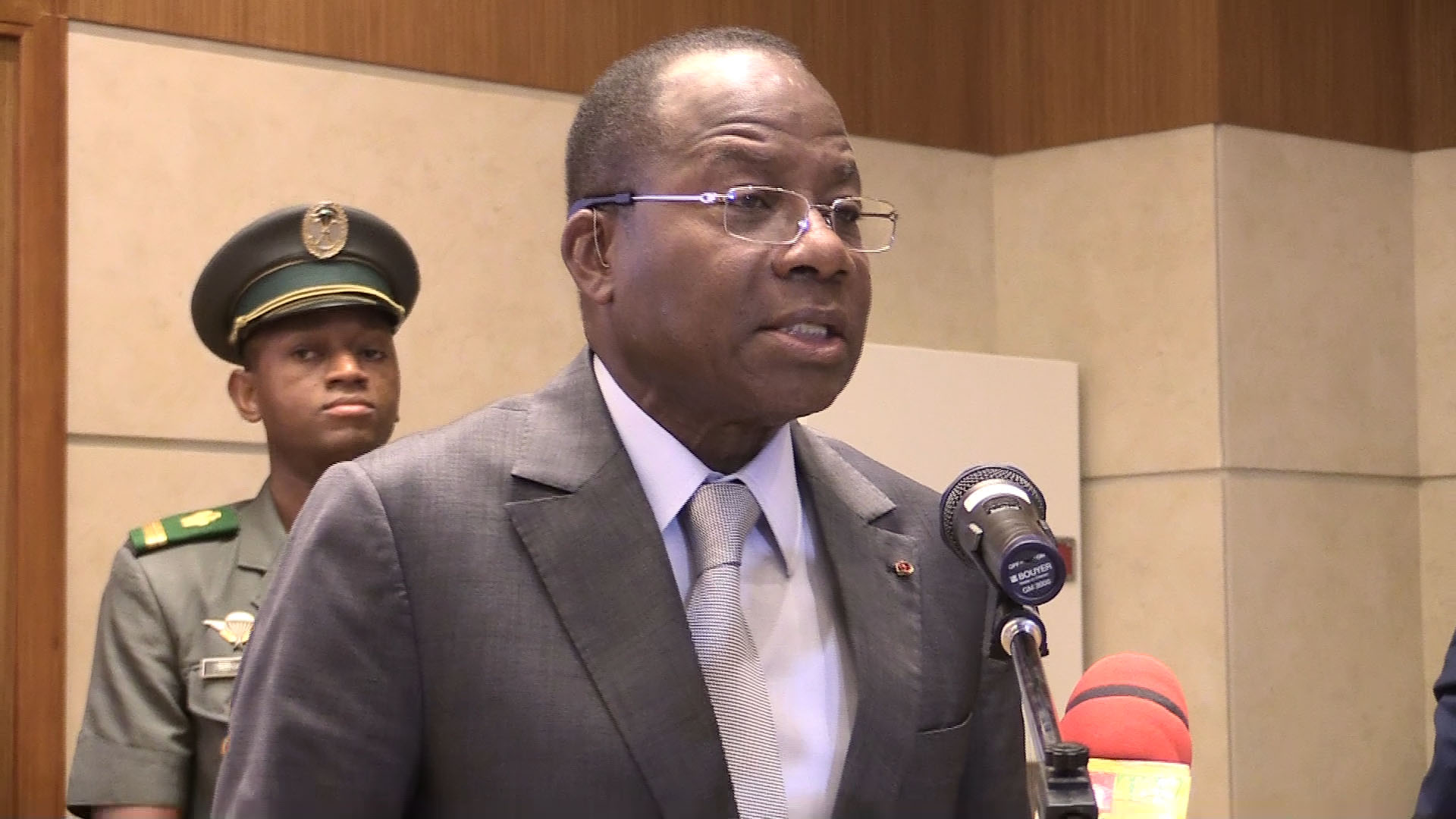
Nominee	Boni Yayi	Adrien Houngbédji
Party	Independent	PRD
Popular vote	1,979,305	673,937
Percentage	74.60%	25.40%
President before election
Mathieu Kérékou
FARD-Alafia
Elected President
Thomas Boni Yayi
Independent

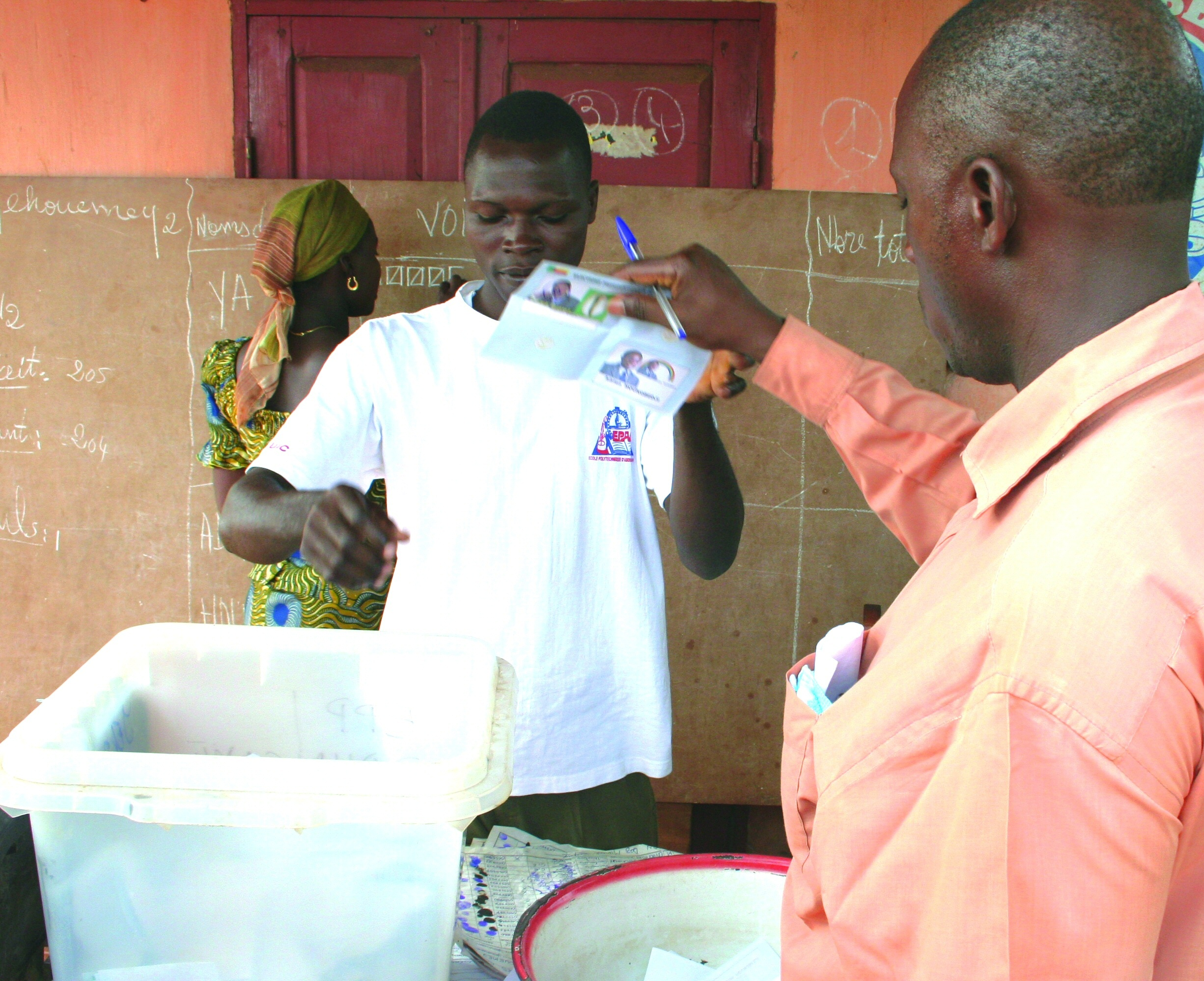
Members of the National Autonomous Electoral Commission (CENA) are counting the votes after the second round on 19 March 2006

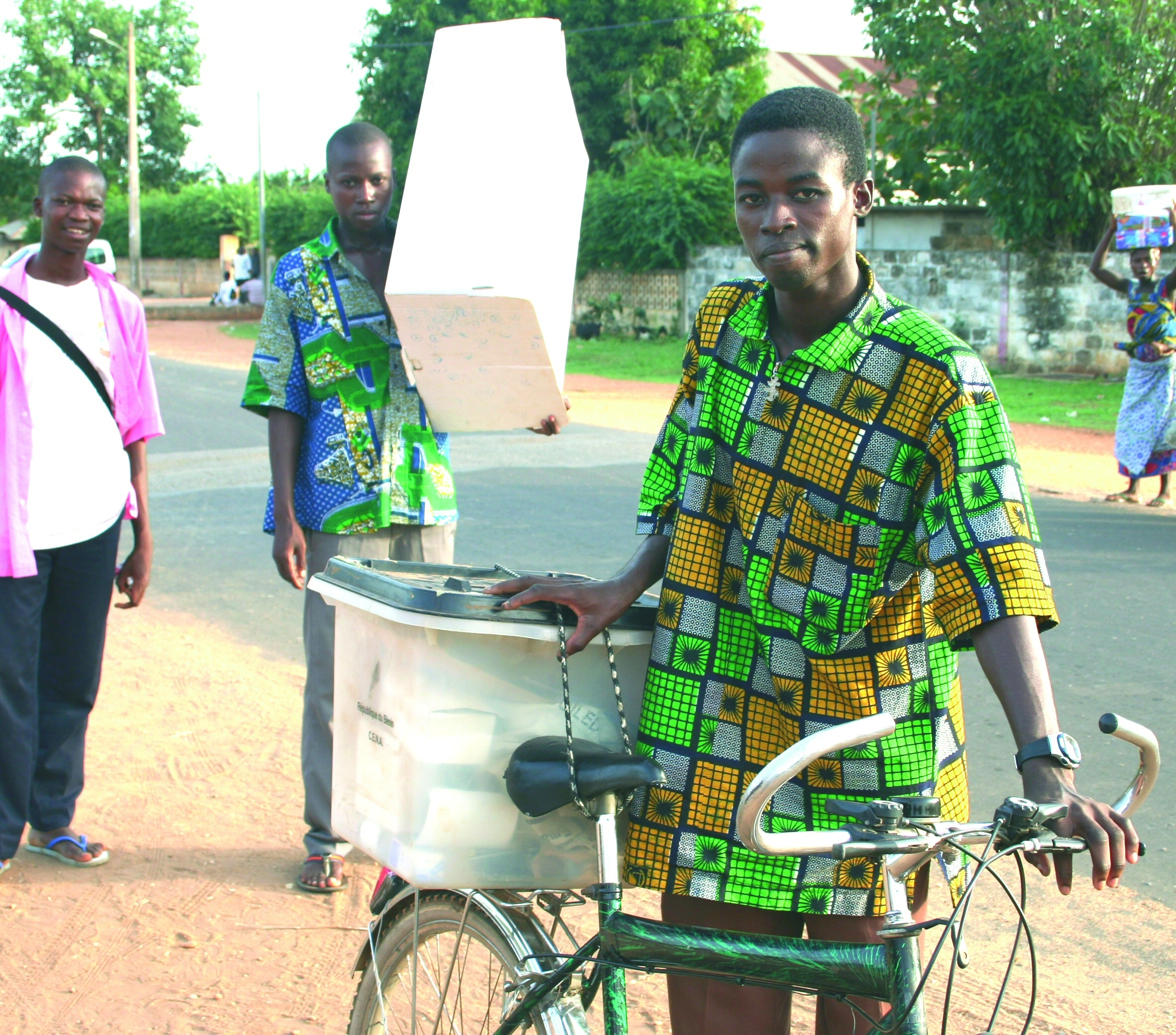
Civil Society members offer their own transportation means to carry and safeguard the transparent ballot boxes from the polling stations to the electoral commission offices.

Presidential elections were held in Benin on 5 March 2006. Long-term president Mathieu Kérékou, who had led the country for all but five years since 1972, was barred from running for a third term. The constitution not only stipulated an absolute two-term limit, but required presidents to be 70 years old or younger when taking office; Kérékou had turned 70 in 2003. In July 2005, Kérékou signalled that he would not seek to change the constitution, as has been done in some other African countries, so that he could run again. Kérékou's long-time rival Nicéphore Soglo was also barred from standing due to his age.

With the men who had been among the country's leading political figures since the return of democracy barred from running, the campaign had a level of openness and unpredictability not common for African presidential elections. Since no candidate won a majority, a second round was held between the two leading candidates on 19 March; Thomas Boni Yayi won the election and took office in April.

== Candidates ==
A total of 33 candidate applications were registered with the Autonomous National Electoral Commission (CENA). In a ruling issued on 30 January 2006, the Constitutional Court accepted 26 candidacies, as the candidacies of Daniel Shalom, Vincent Emmanuel Ahounou, and Adébayo Ananie were rejected because they were deemed medically unfit for the presidency, while the candidacies of Lary Egoundoukpè and Alidou Tamama were rejected because they had not paid the deposit of five million CFA francs required of candidates. Another two candidates, Edgar Alias and Yaro Sourakatou, withdrew in favor of Boni prior to the ruling. The approved candidates included three serving members of Kérékou's government: Zul Kifl Salami, Antoine Dayori, and Kamarou Fassassi. Additionally, the Constitutional Court approved the candidacies of two heads of major institutions: those of Antoine Idji Kolawolé, the President of the National Assembly, and Raphiou Toukourou, the President of the Economic and Social Council.

== Results ==
In the first round, held on 5 March, Boni, former chairman of the West African Development Bank, placed first with around 35% of the vote, and former President of the National Assembly Adrien Houngbédji of the Democratic Renewal Party placed second with around 24% of the vote. In third place was the Social Democratic Party's candidate Bruno Amoussou, a former speaker of parliament and planning minister who obtained around 16% of the vote, and in fourth place was Benin Renaissance candidate Lehady Soglo, son of former president Nicéphore Soglo, with around 8% of the vote. Boni was an independent candidate, and this was his first election; Houngbédji and Amoussou had both run for president three previous times.

Shortly after results were announced in mid-March, the government set the date for the second round between Boni and Houngbédji for 19 March. The country's election commission asked for more time, but this was refused. Boni was backed for the second round by both Amoussou and Soglo. He won the second round with almost 75% of the vote and was sworn in on 6 April.

Candidate	Party	First round		Second round	
Candidate	Party	Votes	%	Votes	%
Thomas Boni Yayi	Independent	1,074,308	35.78	1,979,305	74.60
Adrien Houngbédji	Democratic Renewal Party	727,239	24.22	673,937	25.40
Bruno Amoussou	Social Democratic Party	489,122	16.29		
Léhady Soglo	Benin Rebirth Party	253,478	8.44		
Antoine Kolawolé Idji	African Movement for Development and Progress	97,595	3.25		
Lazare Sèhouéto	Movement for the People's Alternative	61,195	2.04		
Sévérin Adjovi	Liberal Democrats' Rally for National Reconstruction – Vivoten	53,304	1.78		
Antoine Dayori	Hope Force	37,436	1.25		
Kamarou Fassassi	Awakening Party of Democrats of the New Generation	29,494	0.98		
Janvier Yahouédéhou	Independent	23,054	0.77		
Luc Gnacadja	Envol Movement	20,269	0.68		
Daniel Tawéma	Action Front for Renewal and Development	18,125	0.60		
Ibrahima Idrissou	Rally for National Unity and Democracy	18,106	0.60		
Richard Sènou	Independent	15,672	0.52		
Soulé Dankoro	Democratic Party	9,929	0.33		
Marie-Elise Gbèdo	Independent	9,815	0.33		
Célestine Zanou	Independent	9,474	0.32		
Lionel Agbo	African Congress of Democrats	9,026	0.30		
Zul Kifl Salami	Independent	8,538	0.28		
Richard Adjaho	Independent	7,448	0.25		
Gatien Houngbédji	Democratic Union for Economic and Social Development	6,544	0.22		
Adolphe Djimon Hodonou	Independent	6,512	0.22		
Galiou Soglo	Independent	5,243	0.17		
Léandre Djagoué	Rally of Liberal Democrats – Hêviosso	4,665	0.16		
Marcel Gbaguidi	Independent	3,479	0.12		
Raphiou Toukourou	Independent	3,419	0.11		
Total		3,002,489	100.00	2,653,242	100.00
Valid votes		3,002,489	94.14	2,653,242	97.45
Invalid/blank votes		186,777	5.86	69,564	2.55
Total votes		3,189,266	100.00	2,722,806	100.00
Registered voters/turnout		3,917,865	81.40	3,919,550	69.47
Source: African Elections Database
