= Social Democratic Party (Benin) =

Political party in Benin

Social Democratic Party Parti Social-Démocrate
- Leader: Emmanuel Golou
- Founded: 1990
- Ideology: Social democracy Democratic socialism
- Political position: Centre-left

The Social Democratic Party (French: Parti Social-Démocrate) is a political party in Benin.

The PSD was founded in 1990. Running together with the National Union for Solidarity and Progress (UNSP) in the February 1991 parliamentary election, the PSD won 9.8% of the vote and eight out of 64 seats in the National Assembly.

The PSD's first ordinary congress began on 29 January 2000; this was the party's first congress in ten years. 700 delegates participated in the congress, and at the congress a national executive committee, composed of 19 members, was elected. Bruno Amoussou was elected as the party's president on this occasion, while Felix Adimi was elected as vice-president and Emmanuel Golou was elected as secretary-general.

Amoussou was the PSD candidate in the 2001 presidential election. He won 8.6% of the popular vote in the first round, held on 4 March 2001, and placed fourth. The second and third place candidates disputed the election and chose to boycott the second round, leaving Amoussou to face President Mathieu Kérékou in the second round, held on 18 March; he received 15.9% of the vote. In the parliamentary election held on 30 March 2003, the party was a member of the Presidential Movement, the alliance of supporters of Mathieu Kérékou. It co-established inside this Movement the Union for Future Benin, which won 31 out of 83 seats.

In the presidential election held on 5 March 2006, the PSD candidate, Amoussou, won 16.29% of the votes.

In the March 2007 parliamentary election, the PSD participated in the Alliance for a Dynamic Democracy, which won a total of 20 seats.

At the PSD's second ordinary congress in mid-2009, Amoussou was re-elected as PSD President. He resigned as PSD President on 22 January 2012.

The PSD is a full member of the Socialist International.
