= Alliance for Social Democracy =

Political party in Benin

Alliance for Social Democracy (French: Alliance pour la Social-Démocratie) is a political party in Benin led by Robert Dossou. The ASD was legally recognized on 12 October 1990.
