= Union for Future Benin =

Political party in Benin

The Union for Future Benin (French: Union pour le Bénin du futur) was an electoral alliance in Benin. The alliance was made up of a coalition of political parties which were part of the Presidential Movement, a movement of supporters of Mathieu Kérékou who had won the controversial 2001 presidential elections. The Union for Future Benin supported Kérékou in the parliamentary elections held on 30 March 2003 and won 31 out of 83 seats.

In this election, Karamou Fassassi was elected to the National Assembly of Benin as a candidate of the Union for Future Benin. He then ran in the March 2006 presidential election, claiming that he wanted to defend Kérékou's legacy; he lost to Boni Yayi.

The most important of the member parties were the Action Front for Renewal and Development (Front d'action pour le rénouveau et le développement) and the Social Democratic Party (Parti Social-Démocrate).
