= National Union for Democracy and Progress (Benin) =

Political party in Benin

The National Union for Democracy and Progress (Union Nationale pour la Démocratie et le Progrès) is a political party of Benin. In the parliamentary election held on 31 March 2007, the party won two out of 83 seats.
