= Party for Democracy and Social Progress =

Political party in Benin

The Party for Democracy and Social Progress (French: Parti pour la Démocratie et le Progrès Social) is a political party of Benin. In the parliamentary election held on 31 March 2007, the party won one out of 83 seats.
