= Congress of People for Progress =

Political party in Benin

The Congress of People for Progress (French: Congrès du Peuple pour le Progrès) is a political party in Benin. At the last legislative elections in Benin, on March 30, 2003, the party was a member of the Presidential Movement, the alliance of supporters of Mathieu Kérékou, who had won the 2001 presidential elections. It took part in a combined list of the Movement for Development by Culture, the Party of Salvation and the Congress of People for Progress, that won two of the 83 available seats.
