= Robert Dossou =

Beninese politician

Robert Dossou (born 13 May 1939) is a Beninese politician. He was the foreign minister of Benin from 1993 to 1995.

Political offices
Preceded by Saturnin Soglo	Foreign Minister of Benin; 1993–1995	Succeeded by Edgar Yves Monnou
