= 2007 Beninese parliamentary election =

- 31 March 2007
- All 83 seats in the National Assembly; 42 seats needed for a majority
- Turnout: 58.69%
Party	Leader	Seats	+/–
FCBE	Thomas Boni Yayi	35	New
ADD	Antoine Idji Kolawolé	16	−4
PRD	Adrien Houngbédji	10	−1
Key Force	Lazare Sèhouéto	4	−1
Union for Relief	Issa Salifou	3	New
UNDP		2	New
Hope Force	Antoine Dayori	2	New
CBE		2	New
Alliance for Revival		2	New
AFP		1	0
PDPS		1	New
Restore the Hope		1	New
This lists parties that won seats. See the complete results below.

Parliamentary elections were held in Benin on 31 March 2007, having been delayed from an earlier date of 25 March due to organisational difficulties. Twenty-six political parties and 2,158 candidates contested the elections for the 83 seats in the National Assembly; there were 24 constituencies and 17,487 polling stations.

The elections saw the Cowry Forces for an Emerging Benin emerge as the largest party, winning 35 of the 83 seats. Turnout was estimated at 58.69%. The new National Assembly was sworn in on 23 April.

== Results ==
Party	Votes	%	Seats	+/–
Cowry Forces for an Emerging Benin			35	New
Alliance for a Democratic Dynamic			20	–4
Democratic Renewal Party			10	–1
Key Force			4	–1
Union for Relief			3	New
National Union for Democracy and Progress			2	New
Hope Force			2	New
Coalition for an Emerging Benin			2	New
Alliance for Revival			2	New
Alliance of the Forces of Progress			1	0
Party for Democracy and Social Progress			1	New
Restore the Hope			1	New
Total			83	0
Registered voters/turnout		58.69		
Source: IPU
