= 2001 Beninese presidential election =

Re-election of Mathieu Kérékou

- 4 March 2001 (first round); 18 March 2001 (second round)
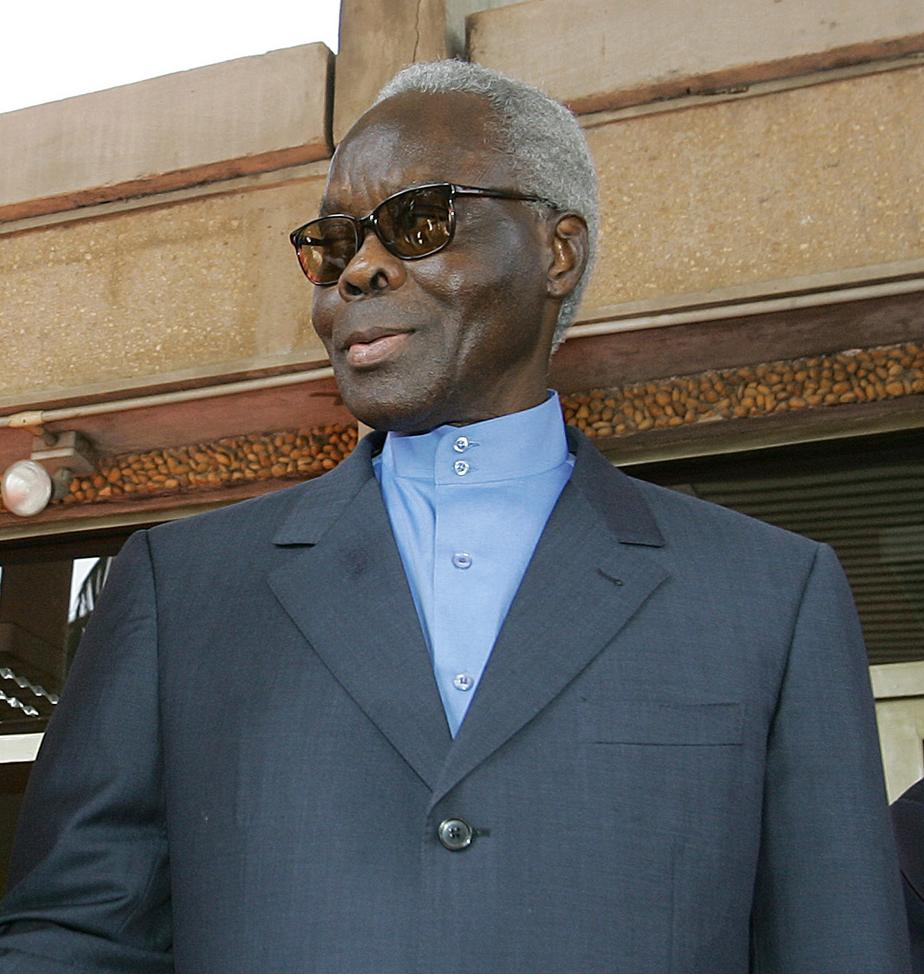

Candidate	Mathieu Kérékou	Bruno Amoussou
Party	FARD-Alafia	Social Democratic
Popular vote	1,282,855	250,940
Percentage	83.64%	16.36%
President before election
Mathieu Kérékou
Independent
Elected President
Mathieu Kérékou
FARD-Alafia

Presidential elections were held in Benin on 4 March 2001, with a second round run-off on 18 March. They controversially resulted in the re-election of Mathieu Kérékou for a second term. Kérékou's rival Nicéphore Soglo, who had been president from 1991 to 1996, failed in his bid to reclaim the presidency; although he qualified to participate in the second round of the election against Kérékou, he refused to do so, alleging electoral fraud. Adrien Houngbédji, the parliament speaker and third-placed candidate, also refused to participate in a second round. As a result, Kérékou faced fourth-place candidate Bruno Amoussou, who was planning minister and had already given his support to Kérékou, in the second round; Kérékou won an easy victory with 84% of the vote.

After the election, it was revealed that the Titan Corporation, a defense contractor based in the United States, had illegally provided $2 million to Kérékou's re-election campaign. The company pleaded guilty and agreed to pay $28.5 million in fines and civil penalties, the largest penalty under the Foreign Corrupt Practices Act up to that point, for bribery and filing false tax returns.

== Results ==
Candidate	Party	First round		Second round	
Candidate	Party	Votes	%	Votes	%
Mathieu Kérékou	Action Front for Renewal and Development	1,127,100	45.42	1,282,855	83.64
Nicéphore Soglo	Benin Rebirth Party	672,927	27.12		
Adrien Houngbédji	Democratic Renewal Party	313,186	12.62		
Bruno Amoussou	Social Democratic Party	213,136	8.59	250,940	16.36
Sacca Lafia	Union for Democracy and National Solidarity	29,656	1.20		
François-Xavier Loko	Independent	16,656	0.67		
Soulé Dankoro	Democratic Party	15,614	0.63		
Adébayo Abimbola	National Rally for Democracy	15,251	0.61		
Wallis Zoumarou	National Union for Solidarity and Progress	13,576	0.55		
Rhétice Dagba	Independent	12,697	0.51		
Marie-Elise Gbèdo	Independent	8,952	0.36		
Léandre Djagoué	Liberal Democrats' Rally for National Reconstruction – Vivoten	8,565	0.35		
Lionel Agbo	African Congress of Democrats	8,226	0.33		
Gatien Houngbédji	Democratic Union for Social and Economic Development	8,092	0.33		
Olofindji Akandé	Independent	6,258	0.25		
Sadikou Alao	National Alliance for a Democratic Alternative	6,223	0.25		
François Kouyami	Independent	5,414	0.22		
Total		2,481,529	100.00	1,533,795	100.00
Valid votes		2,481,529	93.20	1,533,795	89.82
Invalid/blank votes		181,066	6.80	173,809	10.18
Total votes		2,662,595	100.00	1,707,604	100.00
Registered voters/turnout		3,034,471	87.74	3,152,365	54.17
Source: African Elections Database
