= Action Front for Renewal and Development =

Political party in Benin

Action Front for Renewal and Development Front d'action pour le renouveau et le développement
- Abbreviation: FARD-Alafia
- Secretary-General: Daniel Tawéma
- Founder: Jerome Sacca Kina Guezere
- Founded: 1994

The Action Front for Renewal and Development (French: Front d'action pour le renouveau et le développement, FARD-Alafia) is a political party in Benin founded in 1994. Mathieu Kérékou was a member of this party during his second presidency, which lasted from 1996 to 2006.

Kérékou stood as party's candidate in the presidential election of March 4 and 18 March 2001, winning 45.4% of the popular vote in the first round and 84.1% in the second round. The second round was boycotted by the main contenders.

In February 2004, Daniel Tawéma, who was then Minister of the Interior, was elected as the party's secretary general, succeeding Jerome Sacca Kina Guezere.

In the parliamentary election held on 30 March 2003, the party was member of the Presidential Movement, the alliance of Kérékou's supporters. It established inside this Movement the Union for Future Benin, that won 31 out of 83 seats.

FARD's candidate in the March 2006 presidential election was Daniel Tawéma, who took 0.60% of the vote.
