= Bertin Borna =

Beninese politician

Bertin Borna Babiliba (20 November 1930 – 15 June 2007) was a Beninese politician. He served as Minister of Finance.

He was born on 20 November 1930 in Tanguiéta and received an international education. Borna attended the Parakou Congress of 1957 and aligned himself with Hubert Maga. Borna served as vice president of the National Assembly from 1959 to 1960. He was minister of public works from 1958 to 1960. That year, he was named finance minister, a post he held until the coup in 1963. Christophe Soglo brought him back as finance minister in 1966, but his appointment led to agitations that resulted in the 1967 coup. Borna was accused of being involved in the 1975 coup attempt and was sentenced to death in absentia on 7 March 1975. Remaining in Abidjan and Lomé, Borna remained active in international trade. He became a UN director for the Sahel in 1982. After returning to Benin in 1990, Borna unsuccessfully ran for president in 1991. He did manage to be elected to the national assembly that year however. He died on 15 June 2007.
