= 2003 Beninese parliamentary election =

- 30 March 2003
- All 83 seats in the National Assembly; 42 seats needed for a majority
- Turnout: 55.90%
Party	Leader	Seats
Presidential Movement (52 seats)
Union for Future Benin	Bruno Amoussou	31
MADEP	Antoine Idji Kolawolé	9
Key Force	Lazare Sèhouéto	5
MDC–PS–CPP		2
IPD	Bertin Borna	2
AFP		1
MDS		1
RDP	Dominique Houngninou	1
Opposition (31 seats)
RB	Rosine Vieyra Soglo	15
PRD	Adrien Houngbédji	11
Star Alliance	Sacca Lafia	3
New Alliance		2
This lists parties that won seats. See the complete results below.

Parliamentary elections were held in Benin on 30 March 2003. The result was a victory for the parties of the pro-government Presidential Movement supporting President Mathieu Kérékou, which won 52 of the 83 seats.

== Results ==
Party	Votes	%	Seats
Union for Future Benin			31
African Movement for Development and Progress			9
Key Force			5
MDC–PS–CPP Alliance			2
Impulse for Progress and Development			2
Alliance of the Forces of Progress			1
Movement for Development and Solidarity			1
Rally for Democracy and Progress			1
Presidential Movement			52
Benin Rebirth Party			15
Democratic Renewal Party			11
Star Alliance			3
New Alliance			2
Opposition			31
Other parties			0
Total			83
Valid votes	1,486,274	86.21	
Invalid/blank votes	237,819	13.79	
Total votes	1,724,093	100.00	
Registered voters/turnout	3,084,422	55.90	
Source: African Elections Database
