= National Rally for Democracy (Benin) =

Political party in Benin

National Rally for Democracy (French: Rassemblement national pour la démocratie) is a political party in Benin. RND was legally recognized on October 5, 1990.

For the legislative elections held between February 17 and March 24, 1991, the RND won seven National Assembly seats. In 1997 Abimbola Adébayo Anani became the party president.

In the 2001 presidential elections, Anani was supported by RND and the Popular Front for the Republic. Anani later withdrew in favour of Mathieu Kérékou.
