= Soglo =

Soglo may refer to:

- Christophe Soglo (1909–1983), Beninese military officer and political leader
- Ganiou Soglo (born 1962), Beninese politician of the Benin Rebirth Party (RB)
- Léhady Soglo (born 1960), Beninese politician
- Nicéphore Soglo (born 1934), Beninois politician, Prime Minister of Benin (1990–1991), President (1991–1996)
- Rosine Vieyra Soglo (1933–2021), member of the Pan-African Parliament from Benin
- Saturnin Soglo, Beninese politician
- Sosthène Soglo (born 1986), Beninese football player

== See also ==
- Joglo
- Koglo
- Oglio
- Soglio (disambiguation)
