= Ganiou Soglo =

Beninese politician (born 1962)

Ganiou Soglo (born November 4, 1962) is a Beninese politician of the Benin Rebirth Party (RB) who served in the government for a time as Minister of Culture, Literacy, and the Promotion of National Languages. He is the son of former President Nicéphore Soglo and brother of Léhady Soglo.

Soglo, the youngest son of former President Nicéphore Soglo and former First Lady Rosine Vieyra Soglo, was born in Paris. He was elected as an RB candidate to the National Assembly of Benin in the March 2003 parliamentary election. Later, he was a candidate in the March 2006 presidential election, running despite his party's choice of Léhady Soglo as its candidate. Ganiou won about 5,000 votes, or 0.17% of the vote.

In sports, Soglo led the Sharks of the Atlantic football team for a time.

In the government of President Yayi Boni appointed on June 17, 2007, Soglo was appointed Minister of Youth, Sports, and Leisure. He was subsequently moved to the post of Minister of Culture, Literacy, and the Promotion of National Languages on October 22, 2008.

On Friday, February 5, 2021, Ganiou Soglo was shot in the chest and wounded in an ambush attack near the town of Zinvié . Soglo was a passenger in a car which traveling from a farm he owns in Abomey-Calavi when the attack took place. He was treated at Hubert Maga National University Hospital, before being flown to France for medical treatment.
