= Memorial to the Abolition of Slavery =

Monument in France

Coordinates: 47.2093°N 1.5651°W

- Mémorial de l'abolition de l'esclavage
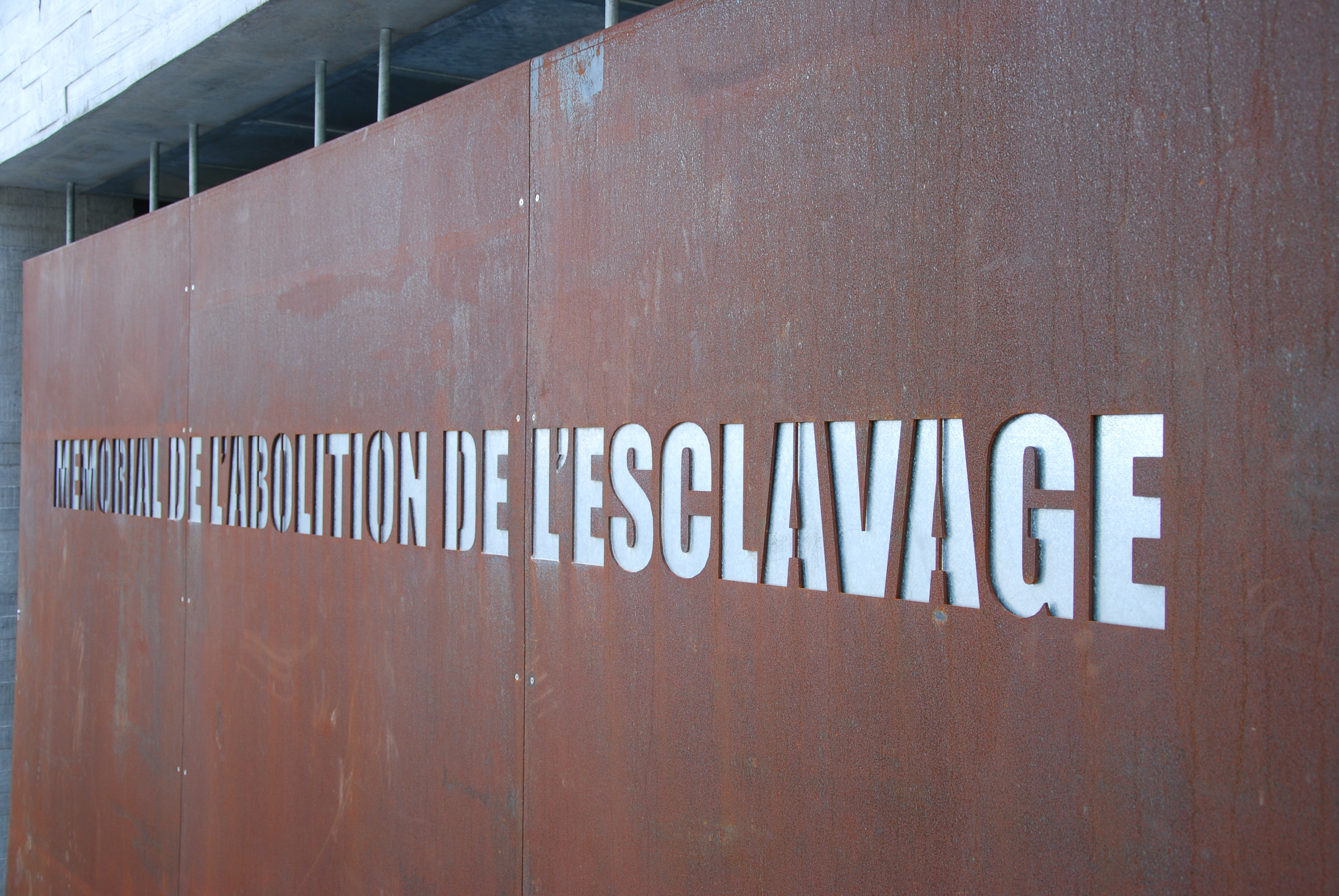
- Interactive map of Memorial to the Abolition of Slavery
- Dedicated date: March 25, 2012

The Memorial to the Abolition of Slavery (French: Mémorial de l'abolition de l'esclavage) is a memorial on the Quai de la Fosse in Nantes, France. The site memorializes the victims of Nantes' active role in the slave trade. The memorial, the largest such site in the world, was dedicated on March 25, 2012.

== Description ==
The memorial was designed by Argentine–American Architect Julian Bonder and Polish artist Krzysztof Wodiczko.

The memorial begins with a path along the Loire river banks, between the Anne-de-Bretagne Bridge and the Victor-Schoelcher footbridge. The path is covered in 2,000 spaced glass inserts, with 1,710 of them commemorating the names of slave ships and their port dates in Nantes. The other 290 inserts name ports in Africa, the Americas, and the area around the Indian Ocean. The path and surrounding 1.73-acre park lead to the under-the-docks part of the memorial which opens with a staircase, leading visitors underground closer to the water level of the river, which can be seen through the gaps between the support pillars. Upon entry, visitors are greeted with The Universal Declaration of Human Rights and the word "freedom" written in 47 different languages from areas affected by the slave trade. Other etchings of quotes by figures like Nelson Mandela and Dr. Martin Luther King Jr. appear on the slanted frosted glass wall which lined the memorial wall opposite the pillars which open to the river. These quotes come from across the globe, from all four continents affected by the slave trade, and span over five centuries, from the 17th to the 21st. At the end of the hall, toward the exit, is a room with the timeline of slavery as it became abolished in various countries around the world.

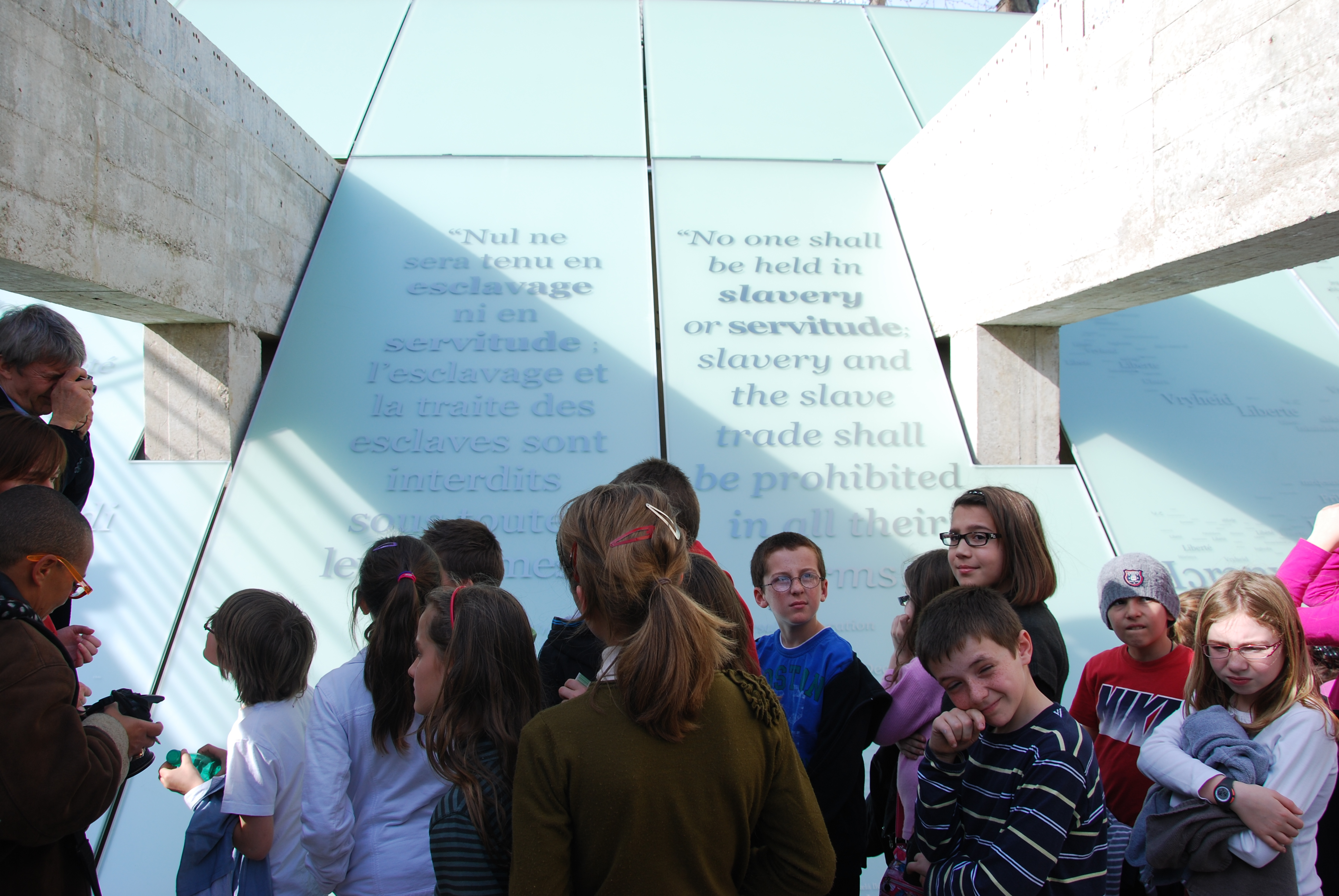
Children attend the dedication ceremony

== History ==
In 1998, student Lisa Marcault-Dérouard produced and dedicated a statue in Nantes memorializing victims of slavery and commemorating the 150th anniversary of the 1848 Abolition Act. The statue, produced independently of the municipal government was later found vandalized. Recognizing the need for a permanent memorial, then mayor–Jean-Marc Ayrault, imitated a process of official commemoration.

The memorial was dedicated on March 25, 2012, at a ceremony attended by Ayrault, former Benin President Nicéphore Soglo, former First Lady of Benin Rosine Vieyra Soglo, Christiane Taubira, and Lilian Thuram, among others.
