= Vicentia Boco =

Beninese doctor (1949-)

Minister of Higher Education and Research
- In office 2007–2008
- President: Thomas Yayi Boni

Personal details
- Born: 22 January 1949 (age 77) Natitingou, French Dahomey
- Citizenship: Benin
- Education: University of Nancy; University of Strasbourg
- Occupation: Radiologist, professor, politician, women's rights activist

Vicentia Boco (born 22 January 1949) is a Beninese radiologist, professor, politician, and women's rights activist. A trained doctor who served as professor of medical imaging at the University of Abomey-Calavi and head of radiology at the Centre National Hospitalier Universitaire in Cotonou until her retirement in 2014, politically she was the Minister of Higher Education and Scientific Research between 2007 and 2008 and president of the Institut national pour la promotion de la femme (INPF) between 2009 and 2021.

== Early life and education ==
Boco was born in Natitingou, Atakora Department, in what was then French Dahomey, and was raised in Savi in Atlantique Department, the daughter of two teachers. In 1968, Boco graduated from high school with a bac D in sciences.

In 1968, Boco moved to Belgium to start medical training in radiology, which at the time was not taught in Benin. Boco subsequently restarted her medical studies in France, qualifying as a doctor in 1974 from Paris Descartes University. After receiving further degrees in public health from the University of Nancy and magnetic resonance imaging from the University of Strasbourg, Boco returned to Benin in 1983.

== Medical career ==
After returning to Benin, Boco worked as a radiographer. From 1998 until her retirement in 2014, she acted as head of radiology at the Centre National Hospitalier Universitaire in Cotonou.

In addition to her medical work, Boco also taught as professor of medical imaging within the Faculté des Sciences de la Santé at the University of Abomey-Calavi, also in Cotonou until 2014. Her role at the institution led to her being described as the first French-speaking university radiologist in sub-Saharan Africa.

Boco has spoken out in support of abortion in cases of physical risk or financial difficulty.

== Political career ==
Between 1993 and 1996, Boco acted as a medical advisor to the government of Benin on health and social affairs, during the presidency of Nicéphore Soglo.

=== Minister of Higher Education and Scientific Research (2007-2008) ===
During the 2000s, Boco became an ally of Thomas Boni Yayi, a banker and politician. She was his campaign manager during the 2006 presidential election, which he ultimately won. In June 2007, Boni appointed Boco as Minister of Higher Education and Scientific Research. During her tenure, Boco notably scrapped entrance exams and registration fees for students attending Beninese universities, and promoted strengthening the teaching of sciences, as well as improving science facilities in the country.

Boco did receive criticism from some students for not listening to their demands for free tuition. After stepping down from her role in October 2008, Boco expressed dissatisfaction for what she was able to achieve in the role, citing barriers she encountered trying to implement reforms, and reported feeling that Boni did not trust her in the role.

=== President of the Institut national pour la promotion de la femme (2009-2021) ===
It is together that we will fight this fight. We have to teach our men to respect us.

— Vicentia Boco (2020)

Despite her experiences as a minister, Boco continued to share a positive relationship with Boni, serving as his advisor again during the 2011 presidential election. In 2009, Boni appointed Boco as president of the newly established Institut national pour la promotion de la femme (INPF).

Boco led the INFP in preparing reports and studies into the experiences of Beninese women, which were subsequently used as guidance by the Ministry of Planning and Foresight. Boco publicly advocated for keeping girls in education, stating that this would lead to them advancing successfully in Beninese society.

While initially supportive of Boni's presidential pledge of having 30% of members of the National Assembly as being women, she also called on him to ensure women were offered leadership roles on every level, including regional and local politics, as well as decentralised decision-making bodies. In 2016, Patrice Talon succeeded Boni as president of Benin; while Boco remained in her role within the INPF, she later reported feeling that Talon's government was not as interested in promoting women's rights as the previous cabinet.

Boco was critical of the diminished role of women in government following the 2019 election, wherein only eight women were elected. She felt subsequent amendments to the Beninese constitution, which promised to reserve 24 seats in the National Assembly for women, were unsatisfactory, pointing out that this only accounted for 22% of seats in the chamber; she also voiced concern that parties would no longer field female candidates for the remaining 85 seats as a result, further hampering increasing women's presence in politics.

Outside of leadership, Boco also called for greater support for victims of domestic abuse, stating that prison sentences for perpetrators did not help their partners and children, with her feeling a more holistic approach was needed.

In 2021, the government, led by Talon, took over the INPF, renaming it the Institut national de la femme. Boco did not continue in her role.

=== Subsequent events ===
In 2021, Boco was selected to organise the funeral of former First Lady Rosine Vieyra Soglo, in recognition of her work around the emancipation of women.

In 2022, Boco criticsed the twenty-year prison sentence given to opposition politician Reckya Madougou, warning the government against using her sentencing as a deterrent against dissent.

== Honours ==
- Knight of the National Order of Benin
- Knight of the Legion of Honour of France
- Commander of the National Order of Benin
- Honorary Member of the French Society of Radiology (2019)
