= CCFD =

CCFD is an acronym that could stand for:

- Clark County Fire Department
- Columbia Consolidated Fire Department
- Caye Caulker Fire Department
- Comité catholique contre la faim et pour le développement
- Cajun Country Fire Department
