= Marcel de Souza =

Marcel de Souza may refer to:

- Marcel Alain de Souza (1953–2019), Beninese banker and politician, president of the Economic Community of West African States (2016–2018)
- Marcel de Souza (basketball) (born 1956), Brazilian professional basketball player and coach
