= Isidore de Souza =

Beninese archbishop (1934–1999)

- Archbishop of Cotonou
- Church: Catholic Church
- Archdiocese: Archdiocese of Cotonou
- In office: 27 December 1990 – 13 March 1999
- Predecessor: Christophe Adimou
- Successor: Nestor Assogba
- Previous post: Coadjutor Archbishop of Cotonou (1981-1990)

Orders
- Ordination: 8 July 1962 by Bernardin Gantin
- Consecration: 8 December 1981 by Bernardin Gantin

Personal details
- Born: 4 April 1934 Ouidah, Colony of Dahomey and Dependencies, French West Africa, French Empire
- Died: 13 March 1999 (aged 64) Ouidah, Atlantique Department, Benin

Isidore de Souza (4 April 1934 – 13 March 1999) was a Beninese Catholic prelate who served as Archbishop of Cotonou from 1990 to 1999.

== Biography ==
De Souza was born into the aristocratic De Souza family of Ouidah on 4 April 1934. He was the uncle of Chantal Yayi, who served as First Lady of Benin from 2006 to 2016, and the late Marcel Alain de Souza (1953–2019), a banker and former President of the ECOWAS Commission.

De Souza went on to study in Abidjan and Rome. He was ordained a priest on 8 July 1962. De Souza was appointed Coadjutor Archbishop of Cotonou on 17 July 1981 and became Archbishop on 27 December 1990. During his time as coadjutor, he worked closely with Agnès Adjaho: Adjaho later recalled it as them being "Catholic and Marxist revolutionaries". He led the National Conference in February 1990, which was convened to address economic issues but returned Benin to democracy. He was instrumental in preventing the army from disbanding it.

De Souza served as the chairman of the High Council of the Republic from 28 February 1990 to 31 March 1991, setting up the presidential election and a new constitution. He persuaded President Mathieu Kerekou to accept the decisions of the council and return Benin to civilian rule. De Souza was the chairman of the Regional Episcopal Conference of Francophone West Africa from 1997 to his death. He died on 13 March 1999 in Ouidah.
