= Séfou Fagbohoun =

Beninese businessman and politician (1946–2026)

Séfou Fagbohoun (26 January 1946 – 22 August 2026) was a Beninese businessman and politician who served as president of the African Movement for Development and Progress and was a member of the National Assembly of Benin.

== Career ==
He founded the African Movement for Development and Progress party in 1997, and was elected deputy in the 1st, 5th and 6th legislatures of Benin. He was an influential businessman under the regime of General Mathieu Kérékou. He chaired AS Dragons FC de l'Ouémé.

== SONACOP affair ==
On 4 June 2006, Fagbohoun was arrested by the Economic and Financial Brigade in mismanagement at Société Nationale de Commercialisation des Produits Pétroliers. He was released in 2008 after two years under arrest.

== Personal life ==
Séfou Fagbohoun was born on 26 January 1946; he was from the commune of Adja-Ouèrè in Benin. Fagbohoun was married to Albertine Assikidana, herself a member of parliament. The couple's daughter, Karamatou Fagbohoun, served as mayor of Adja-Ouèrè in the early 2020s.

Fagbohoun died on 22 August 2026, at the age of 80.
