= Moise de Souza =

Beninese construction engineer

Moise de Souza is a Beninese construction engineer. He currently serves as Chacha IX, the daa of the aristocratic De Souza family of Ouidah.
