= Agnès Adjaho =

Beninese diplomat, bookseller, nonprofit administrator, and author (born 1949)

H.E. Agnès Adjaho
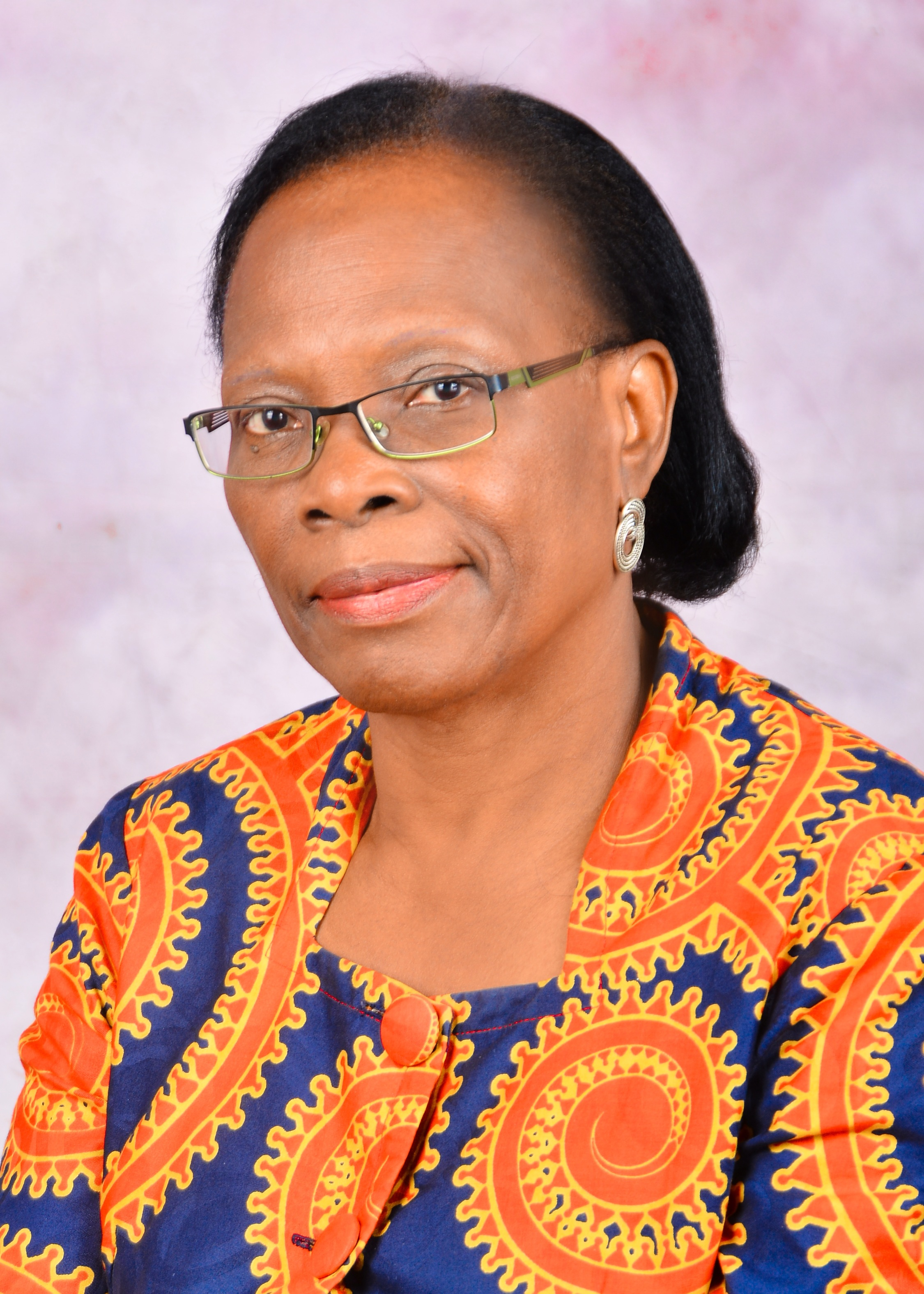
- Adjaho in 2016

Ambassador of Benin to the Holy See
- Incumbent
- Assumed office December 10, 2016

Personal details
- Born: January 21, 1949 (age 77)
- Spouse: Richard Adjaho (d. 2009)
- Education: University of Paris X-Nanterre, Secrétariat des Missions d'Urbanisme et d'Habitat
- Occupation: Bookseller, diplomat, nonprofit administrator, author

Agnès Avognon Adjaho (born 1949) is a Beninese diplomat, bookseller, nonprofit administrator, and author. She has served as the ambassador of Benin to the Holy See since 2016. She was previously the head of the Association internationale des libraires francophones (En: International Association of Francophone Booksellers) from 2005 to 2008. She headed the Notre Dame Bookstore in Cotonou from 1986 to 2010. She also served as Secretary-General and President of the International Movement for the Apostolate of Children, and was a member of the Pontifical Council for the Laity.

== Pre-Ambassadorship ==
Adjaho was born in Cotonou in 1949. She completed her education in France, where she earned a licence in geography from the University of Paris X-Nanterre and subsequently earned a master's in urban planning and housing project management from the Secretariat des Missions d'Urbanisme et d'Habitat. While in France, she served as secretary general of the International Movement for the Apostolate of Children and then served as president for the same organization. She also served as Africa director for the Comité catholique contre la faim et pour le développement.

Upon returning to France in 1982, she became closely associated with Isidore de Souza, who was then the coadjutor archbishop of Cotonou and would go on to become the archbishop. The two worked on infrastructure and training programs together: she has fondly remembered the time as them being "Catholic and Marxist revolutionaries".

She became head of the Notre Dame Bookstore, which was attached to the Cotonou cathedral, in 1986. At the point she took over, it was a procurator's office without much books, but by 2000 it had three stories and a thriving library. She also worked on bringing a university to the area and founding a publishing agency, called the Catholic Books Agency.

She continued in the role of head of the Notre Dame Bookstore even after the death of de Sousa in 1999, and remained there until 2010. She has stated that during that time, she "did politics in the bookstore aisles". She organized caravans to bring books to remote areas of the country. She served as president of the International Association of Francophone Booksellers for four years, beginning her term in March 2005, and subsequently served as Director of Afrilivres, an association for Francophone booksellers in Africa, for a year in 2012.

She also helped run two magazines, Planète Jeunes and Planète Enfants. She has written two books.

She served as a member of the Pontifical Council for the Laity from 1977 to 1984 and again from 1996 to 2001. She also consulted for the Pontifical Council for Culture from 2004 to 2008. In 1994, she was a member of the Holy See's delegation to the International Conference on Population and Development.

She was named an Officer of the Ordre des Arts et des Lettres in 2015.

== Ambassadorship ==
She was appointed Ambassador of Benin to the Holy See in 2016, and moved to Rome during the autumn. When discussing the role, she reflected on the importance of her Catholic faith to her life and career. She presented her credentials to Pope Francis on December 10, 2016. During her ambassadorship, Beninese official Adrien Houngbédji asked her to work on ensuring women's equality. She visited Caritas Benin in 2019.

== Personal life ==
She married Richard Adjaho in 1985. He served as Benin's minister of the interior and ambassador to France and died in 2009.
