= African Movement for Development and Progress =

Political party in Benin

The African Movement for Development and Progress (French: Mouvement africain pour la développement et le progrès, MADEP) is a political party in Benin created in 1997. In the legislative elections held on 30 March 2003, the party was part of the Presidential Movement, the alliance of supporters of President Mathieu Kérékou, who had won the 2001 presidential election, and won nine out of 83 seats. The President of MADEP was Sefou Fagbohoun, a wealthy businessman.

A leading member of the party, Antoine Kolawolé Idji, was elected President of the National Assembly in April 2003. In the presidential election of 5 March 2006, the party's candidate, Antoine Kolawolé Idji, took fifth place with 3.25% of the vote.

In the March 2007 parliamentary election, MADEP participated in the Alliance for a Dynamic Democracy, which won a total of 20 seats.

The party has used the rooster as a symbol in its campaign literature.
