= De Souza family =

West African dynasty

De Souza
- Parent house: Sousa family
- Current region: West Africa
- Origin: Bahia, Brazil
- Founded: 18th century
- Founder: Dom Francisco Felix de Sousa
- Current head: Moise de Souza
- Titles: List: Chacha of Ouidah; Mito of Ouidah; Viceroy of Ouidah
- Connected families: Dahomeyan royal family
- Traditions: Roman Catholicism; West African Vodun
- Estate: Singbomey Compound

The De Souza family, otherwise known as the De Sousa family, is a prominent Beninese clan. Its founder, Francisco Felix de Sousa, was the Brazilian-born viceroy of Ouidah in the Kingdom of Dahomey.

== History ==
After immigrating from Bahia in Brazil to coastal Dahomey in the 18th century, Francisco Felix de Sousa began to function as a trader of various goods - chief of which were slaves.

His activities there made him so influential in Dahomey's affairs that he was recognized by the Dahomeyans as a tribal chief, the chacha of Ouidah, following his support of their ruler King Ghezo in his rise to power. Upon de Sousa's death, the family that he had started with his harem of African consorts continued to be prominent throughout West Africa. The chacha title is still borne by the family's titular leader today.

According to the De Souza family, Francisco Felix de Sousa was the eighth generation descendant of Tomé de Sousa (1503–1579), a Portuguese nobleman who was the first governor-general of the Portuguese colony of Brazil from 1549 to 1553. If true, it would make the contemporary De Souzas members of the Portuguese nobility in addition to being an African chieftaincy family.

Although the De Souzas are part of the Beninese elite, their position in society is not without controversy. The fact that their founder was reputed by some to be the world's most prolific slavetrader has ensured that there is a great deal of resentment directed towards the family by some of their fellow Beninese. In reference to the family's origins and the anger its history sometimes inspires, current chacha Moise de Souza is quoted as saying:

It is something that makes me feel bad. We know it's painful, and all I can do is apologize.

Still, he worried that members of his family would be livid if he shared that sentiment publicly in Benin. He vehemently opposes any mention of de Souza as a slave merchant in the new Ouidah museum.

== Notable members ==
- Chantal Yayi
- Francisco Felix de Sousa
- Isidore de Souza
- Marcel Alain de Souza
- Martine de Souza
- Moise de Souza
- Paul Emile de Souza
