= Jean-Claude Brou =

President of the ECOWAS Commission from 2018 to 2022

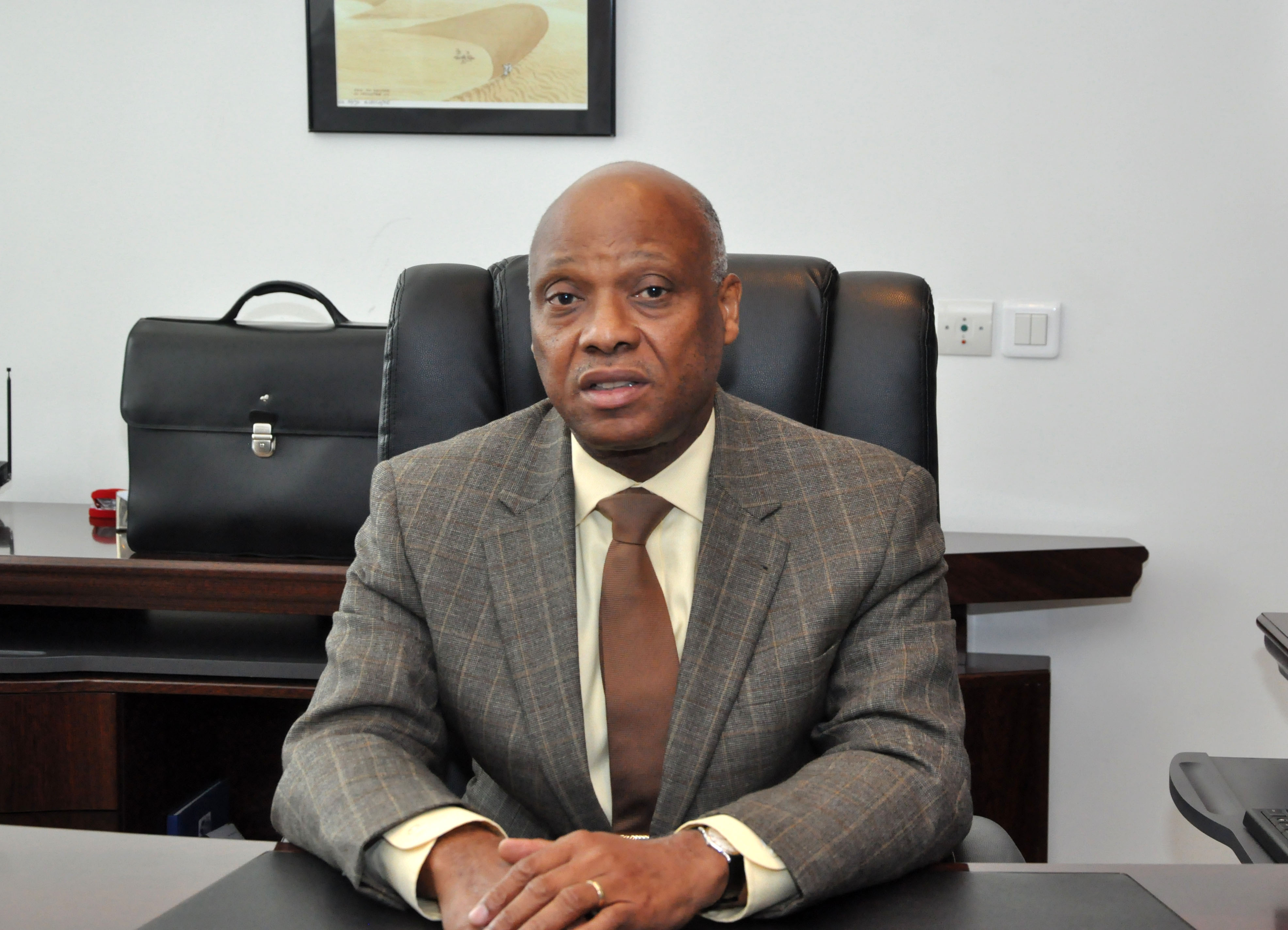

Governor of the Central Bank of West African States
- Incumbent
- Assumed office 3 July 2022
- Preceded by: Tiémoko Meyliet Koné

President of the ECOWAS Commission
- In office 1 March 2018 – 3 July 2022
- Preceded by: Marcel Alain de Souza
- Succeeded by: Omar Touray

Minister of Industry and Mines
- In office November 2012 – 1 March 2018
- President: Alassane Ouattara

Personal details
- Born: Jean-Claude Kassi Brou; 1953 (age 72–73)
- Education: University of Cincinnati

Jean-Claude Kassi Brou (born 1953) is an Ivorian politician and economist who has served as the governor of the Central Bank of West African States since 3 July 2022. He was the president of the Economic Community of West African States Commission from 2018 to 2022. He previously served as minister of Industry and Mines of Ivory Coast from November 2012 to March 2018.

== Life ==
Brou was born in 1953. In 1976 he obtained a degree in economics from the National University of Ivory Coast. He moved to the United States where he studied at the University of Cincinnati, obtaining a master's degree in economics in 1979, an MBA in finance in 1980 and his PhD in economics in 1982. He worked as a professor of economics at the same university between 1981 and 1982. Brou started working for the International Monetary Fund in 1982. He worked as an economist and senior economist in several African countries. From 1990 to 1991 he was the IMF's resident representative in Senegal.

Brou then returned to Ivory Coast, where he served as Economic and Financial Advisor to the Prime Minister from 1991 to 1995. He was subsequently appointed as Chief of Staff to the Prime Minister Daniel Kablan Duncan, in which capacity he served until 1999. In this period he was also head of the privatisation committee, during which 70 state-owned companies were privatized. Brou worked for the Central Bank of West African States between 2000 and 2008. From 2010 until 2012 he was the World Bank representative for Chad. In November 2012 he was appointed Minister of Industry and Mines in the government of President Alassane Ouattara.

On 16 December 2017, during the 52nd Ordinary Session of the Authority of Heads of State and Government of the Economic Community of West African States (ECOWAS) the Presidency of the ECOWAS Commission was assigned to Ivory Coast, with Brou to be appointed the next year for a four-year term. Brou officially took over from Marcel Alain de Souza on 1 March 2018. Brou had remained Minister of Industry and Mines until his appointment.

In June 2022, Jean-Claude Brou was appointed as the new governor of the BCEAO (Central Bank of West African States).

In August 2025, Jean-Claude Brou indicated that he had not received a request to leave the CFA Franc from the states of the Sahel alliance.

Brou is married and has two children.

Political offices
Preceded by Marcel Alain de Souza	President of the ECOWAS Commission; 2018–present	Incumbent
