= Rosine Vieyra Soglo =

Beninese politician (1934–2021)

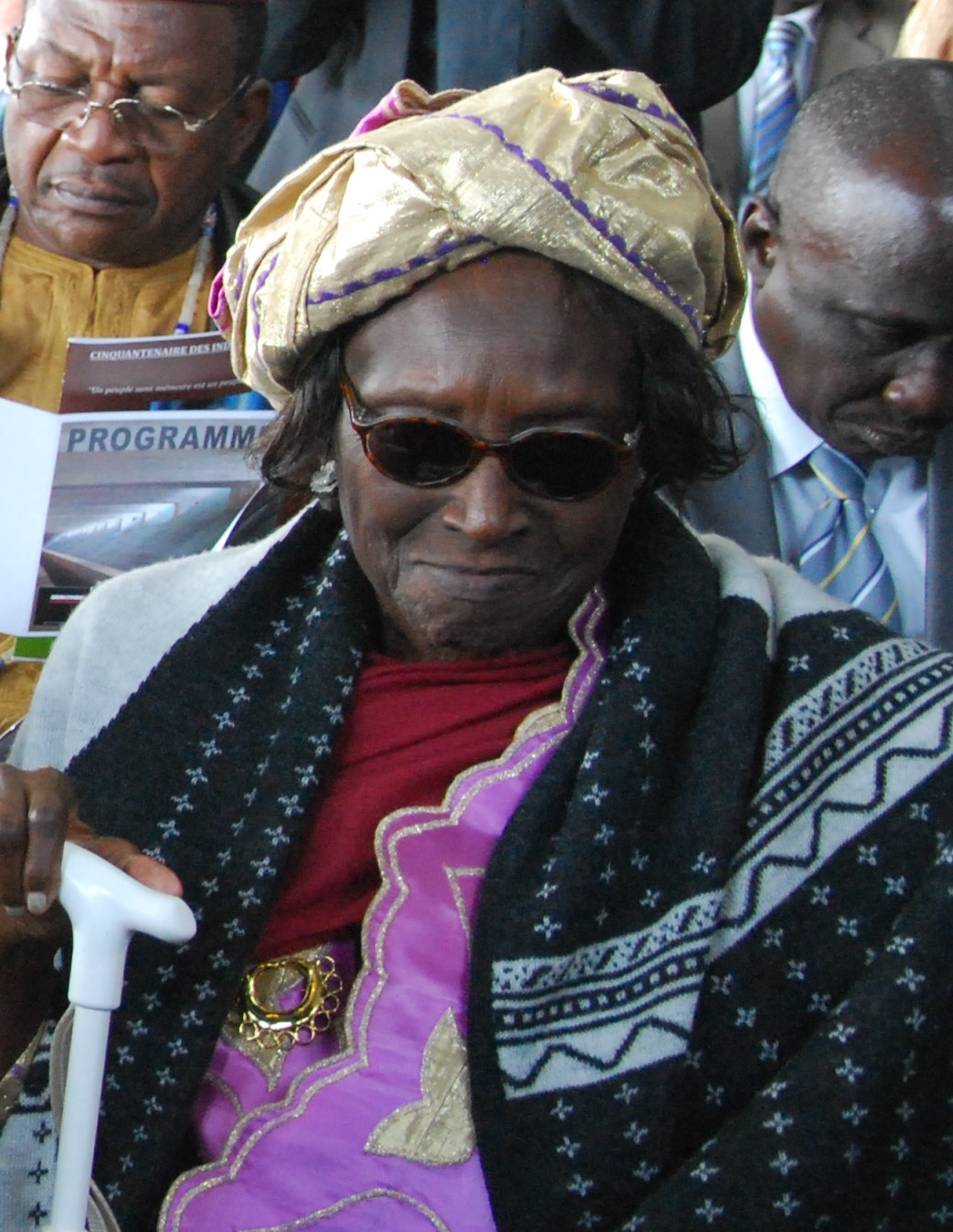
- Rosine Vieyra Soglo attends the dedication of the Memorial to the Abolition of Slavery in Nantes in March 2012

Member of the National Assembly of Benin
- In office 1999 – February 2019

Member of the Pan-African Parliament
- In office 2004–2009

First Lady of Benin
- In office 4 April 1991 – 4 April 1996
- President: Nicéphore Soglo
- Preceded by: Marguerite Kérékou
- Succeeded by: Marguerite Kérékou

Personal details
- Born: Rose-Marie Honorine Vieyra; 7 March 1934 Ouidah, French Dahomey
- Died: 25 July 2021 (aged 87) Cotonou, Benin
- Party: Benin Rebirth Party
- Spouse: Nicéphore Soglo (m. 1958)
- Children: Léhady Soglo; Ganiou Soglo

Rosine Honorine Vieyra Soglo (born Rose-Marie Honorine Vieyra; 7 March 1934 – 25 July 2021) was a Beninese politician. Soglo served as First Lady of Benin from 1991 to 1996 during the presidency of her husband, Nicéphore Soglo. She is considered the first First Lady of the democratic era following Benin's transition to a multi-party democracy.

In 1992, Soglo founded the Benin Rebirth Party (RB), becoming the first Beninese woman to establish a new political party. She served as a member of the National Assembly of Benin, representing the 16th Constituency of Cotonou, for six consecutive terms from 1999 until her retirement in February 2019. She also served as a member of the Pan-African Parliament from 2004 to 2009. Soglo was affectionately nicknamed "Maman" by Beninese colleagues and politicians.

== Early life ==
Soglo, whose real name was Rose-Marie Honorine Vieyra, was born on 7 March 1934 in Ouidah, French Dahomey, into a wealthy family from the city's Afro-Brazilian community. Her father was a railway executive and landowner who was able to send his four children – Rosine and her three brothers – to France for their education. In 1946, she moved to France to attend secondary school at Lycée de Jeunes Filles de Caen. She then studied law in college. After graduation, Soglo went into law, working as a bailiff from 1965 to 1968 and before becoming a lawyer. Vieyra Soglo was multilingual and spoke fluent English, Fon, French, and Mina (also known as the Gen language).

Vieyra met Nicéphore Soglo in France in 1947, while both were students and teenagers aged 16 and 14 respectively. The couple married on 2 July 1958, and had two sons. Their eldest son, Léhady Soglo (born 1960), was a former national deputy and Mayor of Cotonou from 14 August 2015, until his dismissal on 2 August 2017 for alleged corruption. He went into exile in France in 2017 and was sentenced in absentia to ten years in prison by the Criet court. Their second son, Ganiou Soglo (born 1961), a former government minister and presidential candidate, was shot and wounded in an ambush on 5 February 2021.

== Career ==
While Nicéphore Soglo studied at the École nationale d'administration (ENA), Rosine Vieyra Soglo chose to pursue her own studies in law in France. She worked as a bailiff from 1965 to 1968 during her husband's early political career. Meanwhile, Nicéphore Soglo was appointed Minister of Economy during the brief presidential rule of General Christophe Soglo in the early 1960s. In 1972, Major Mathieu Kérékou overthrew the country's government in the 1972 Dahomeyan coup d'état. Nicéphore and Rosine Soglo were forced to flee into exile following the coup and remained abroad for 18 years. The couple lived in Washington D.C. during the 1980s, where Nicéphore Soglo worked as director at the World Bank. They were finally allowed to return to Benin to attend the national conference in Cotonou in February 1990, which marked the country's transition to democracy.

Soglo became First Lady of Benin in August 1991 upon Nicéphore Soglo's election as President during the country's democratic transition. In 1992, First Lady Soglo created the Benin Rebirth Party (RB), becoming the first Beninese woman to establish a political party. Rosine Vieyra Soglo founded the Benin Rebirth Party to garner political support for her husband, who lacked widespread support from the country's political class. The following year, the political party La Renouveau issued a signed statement by Soglo to the media encouraging supporters of her husband to join the Benin Rebirth Party.

Rosine Vieyra Soglo's new party won 20 of the 83 seats in the National Assembly in the 1995 Beninese parliamentary election. However, President Nicéphore Soglo, who was seeking re-election, was defeated by former President Mathieu Kérékou in the 1996 Beninese presidential election.

In 1999, Rosine Vieyra Soglo was elected to the National Assembly of Benin, representing the 16th Constituency of Cotonou. She held her assembly seat from 1999 until 2019, winning re-election to four consecutive terms. During her time as deputy, Rosine Soglo became a vocal critic of some major policies introduced by Presidents Mathieu Kérékou, Thomas Boni Yayi, and Patrice Talon. Most recently, Soglo was fiercely critical of President Patrice Talon. Additionally, Soglo served simultaneously as a Beninese member of the Pan-African Parliament from 2004 to 2009.

In 2007, Soglo joined the Alliance for a Dynamic Democracy coalition with Antoine Idji Kolawolé and Bruno Amoussou. The ADD ran during the March 2007 parliamentary election and obtained 20 seats.

Leading up to the April 2011 parliamentary election, Soglo was the head of the ADD. However, during the 2011 elections, she joined the Union Makes the Nation coalition and promised to improve the quality of Benin's government and habitability.

In the April 2015 parliamentary election, Soglo was re-elected to the National Assembly as a Benin Renaissance candidate in the 16th constituency. Beginning on 19 May 2015, Soglo began presiding over debates as the Dean of the National Assembly, a role given to the oldest member of the legislature. As the oldest member and Dean of the National Assembly (doyenne d'âge), she presided over the initial proceedings of the National Assembly when it began meeting on 19 May 2015, prior to the election of the President of the National Assembly.

In her final address to the National Assembly on 18 February 2019, Rosine Soglo announced her resignation and retirement from office due to the loss of her eyesight, joking that "The old woman goes away and tells you bye bye" in her speech.

Outside of politics, Rosine Vieyra Soglo established the Vidolé Association (l’association Vidolé), which provides support to women and families who have twins, triplets, and quadruplets.

== Later life ==
In 2019, Célestine Zanou, a politician and former presidential candidate, praised Soglo as "our national mother" and called her an "icon of Beninese politics."

In late July 2021, Rosine Soglo was hospitalized for three days at the Mahouena Clinic in Cotonou for treatment of a cardiovascular illness. Her condition initially improved with treatment, but her health rapidly deteriorated on the morning of Saturday, 24 July. She requested to return to her home at la Haie Vive in Cotonou, where she died at approximately 4 p.m. on 25 July 2021 at the age of 88.

She was survived by her husband, former President Nicéphore Soglo, who was abroad in Paris for medical treatment at the time of her death, and their two sons. In a statement, Soglo paid tribute to his late wife saying, "It is this woman who has allowed me to be so strong." Her eldest son, former Cotonou mayor Léhady Soglo, announced that he would return from exile in France for the first time since 2017 to attend his mother's funeral. She was also survived by her second son, Ganiou Soglo, who survived a shooting in February 2021. Soglo's funeral was organised by former minister and women's rights activist Vicentia Boco.

Tributes poured in from figures across Beninese politics, including President Patrice Talon, a frequent political nemesis, who called her "a brave and exceptional woman" in a Facebook post. Others paying tribute to Soglo included former President Thomas Boni Yayi and the President of the Beninese Parliament, Louis Vlavonou, who called her, "a woman of exception and conviction whose participation in six successive legislatures inevitably leaves an indelible imprint on the parliamentary institution and the country as a whole." Opposition leader Paul Hounkpè also stated, "the death of Rosine Soglo, an emblematic figure in Benin's politics since the historic national conference of February 1990, is a great loss for our country and our democracy...She is an intrepid fighter for peace, freedom and democracy in Benin."

== See also ==
- List of members of the Pan-African Parliament
