= Lionel Agbo =

Beninese politician and lawyer

Lionel Jacques Agbo (born 14 August 1950) is a Beninese politician and lawyer.

Born in Ouidah, Agbo studied in Benin and France. He passed the bar exam and practiced law there until 1998, when he decided to return to Benin. He ran for president in 1996 and received 15,418 votes, or 0.92%. He ran for president again in 2001 as a member of the Congres Africain des Democrates. Agbo briefly served as advisor to president Boni Yayi. In 2012, he accused Boni Yayi of corruption and was arrested, but was released after concerns for press freedom were raised by international organizations. In 2015, Agbo was assaulted not far from his home in Cotonou by who he thought was an intelligence agent.
