= Claudine Talon =

Beninese politician

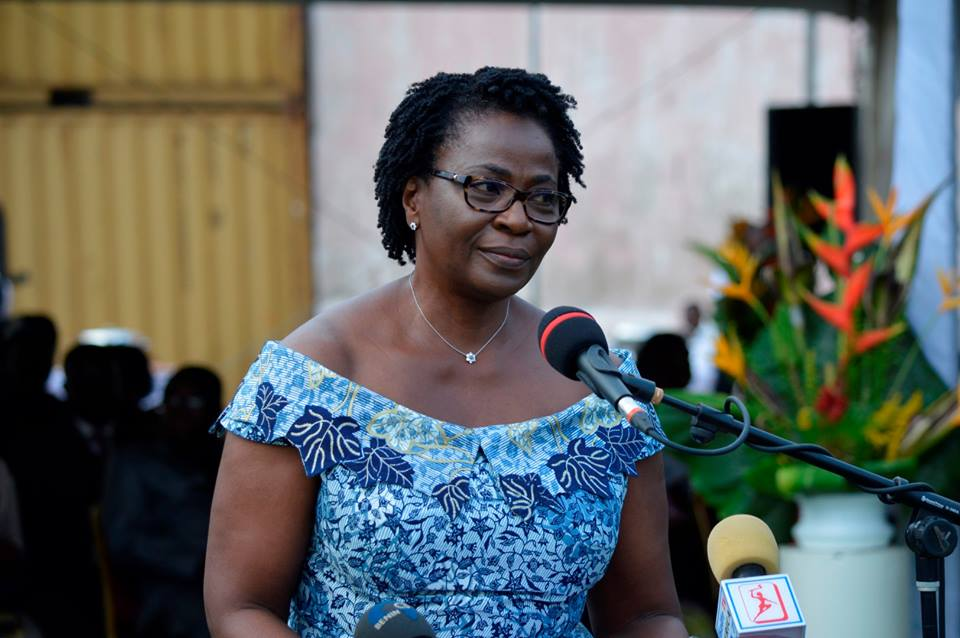

First Lady of Benin
- In office 6 April 2016 – 24 May 2026
- President: Patrice Talon
- Preceded by: Chantal Yayi

Personal details
- Born: Claudine Gbènagnon; 1956 (age 69–70) Porto-Novo, French Dahomey
- Spouse: Patrice Talon
- Children: Two

Claudine Gbènagnon Talon (born 1956) is a Beninese public figure, politician, and First Lady of Benin from 2016 until 2026, as the wife of Patrice Talon, the President of the Republic of Benin.

== Biography ==
Talon was born Claudine Gbènagnon in 1956 in Porto-Novo. She participates in the politics of Benin through her husband, Patrice Talon, and her foundation. After a lengthy absence, Claudine Talon reappeared publicly on March 26, 2021 shortly before the presidential election.

=== Charities ===
Following her husband's election as President of the Republic of Benin, she created the Claudine Talon Foundation. The foundation's mission is to improve the living standards of Beninese women and children, as well as increase access to clean drinking water and sanitation facilities for the country's population. It also aims to improve the quality of children's education and empower disadvantaged women.
