= Chantal Yayi =

Beninese politician (born 1949)

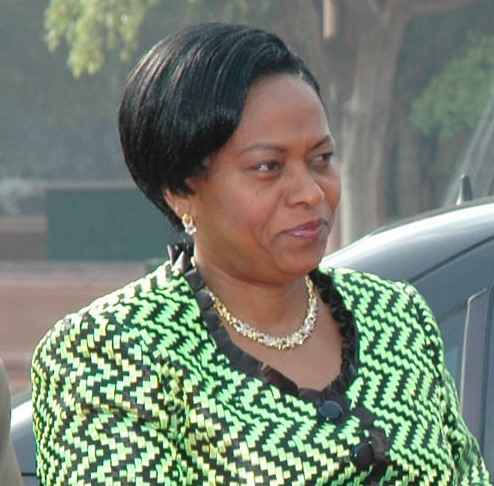
- Yayi in 2009

First Lady of Benin
- In office 6 April 2006 – 6 April 2016
- President: Thomas Boni Yayi
- Preceded by: Marguerite Kérékou
- Succeeded by: Claudine Talon

Personal details
- Born: Chantal de Souza; January 28, 1949 (age 77) Ouidah, Dahomey
- Spouse: Thomas Boni Yayi
- Children: Five
- Relatives: Marcel Alain de Souza (brother); Isidore de Souza (uncle)

Chantal de Souza Yayi (born 28 January 1949) is a Beninese politician and former First Lady of Benin from 2006 until 2016. She is the wife of former Beninese President Thomas Boni Yayi.

== Biography ==
Chantal de Souza Yayi, a native of Ouidah, is a member of the prominent De Souza family, who are originally of Portuguese and Brazilian descent, based around the coastal city. She has ten siblings, including her late older brother, Marcel Alain de Souza (1953–2019), a banker and former President of the ECOWAS Commission. Yayi is a great granddaughter of Francisco Félix de Sousa, who was a Brazilian slave trader and the viceroy of Ouidah. She is the niece of Isidore de Souza, who served as the Archbishop of the Roman Catholic Archdiocese of Cotonou from 1990 until 1999.

Her older brother, Marcel de Souza, introduced her to her future husband, Thomas Boni Yayi. She and Boni Yayi have five children. In 2008, Chantal Yayi and Thomas Boni Yayi, who is a descendant of the Yoruba princes of Sabe in his own right, were awarded chieftaincy titles by the Nigerian king of Ile-Ife, Olubuse II.

As first lady, Yayi focused on education and healthcare.

In preparation for the 2016 Beninese presidential election, Yayi helped her brother set up a small political party, the Republican Front for a Patriotic Alternative, or Front républicain pour une alternative patriotique, (Frap), which Marcel Alain de Souza chaired and used to launch his presidential candidacy. However, Marcel de Souza received only 0.13% of the vote.

In 2021, Yayi reportedly suffered a stroke following months of health problems. She was initially treated in the intensive care unit of Centre National Hospitalier Universitaire-Hubert Maga (CNHU) in Cotonou before being flown to a hospital in Europe for additional treatment in early May 2021.
