= Marcel Alain de Souza =

Beninese politician and banker (1953–2019)

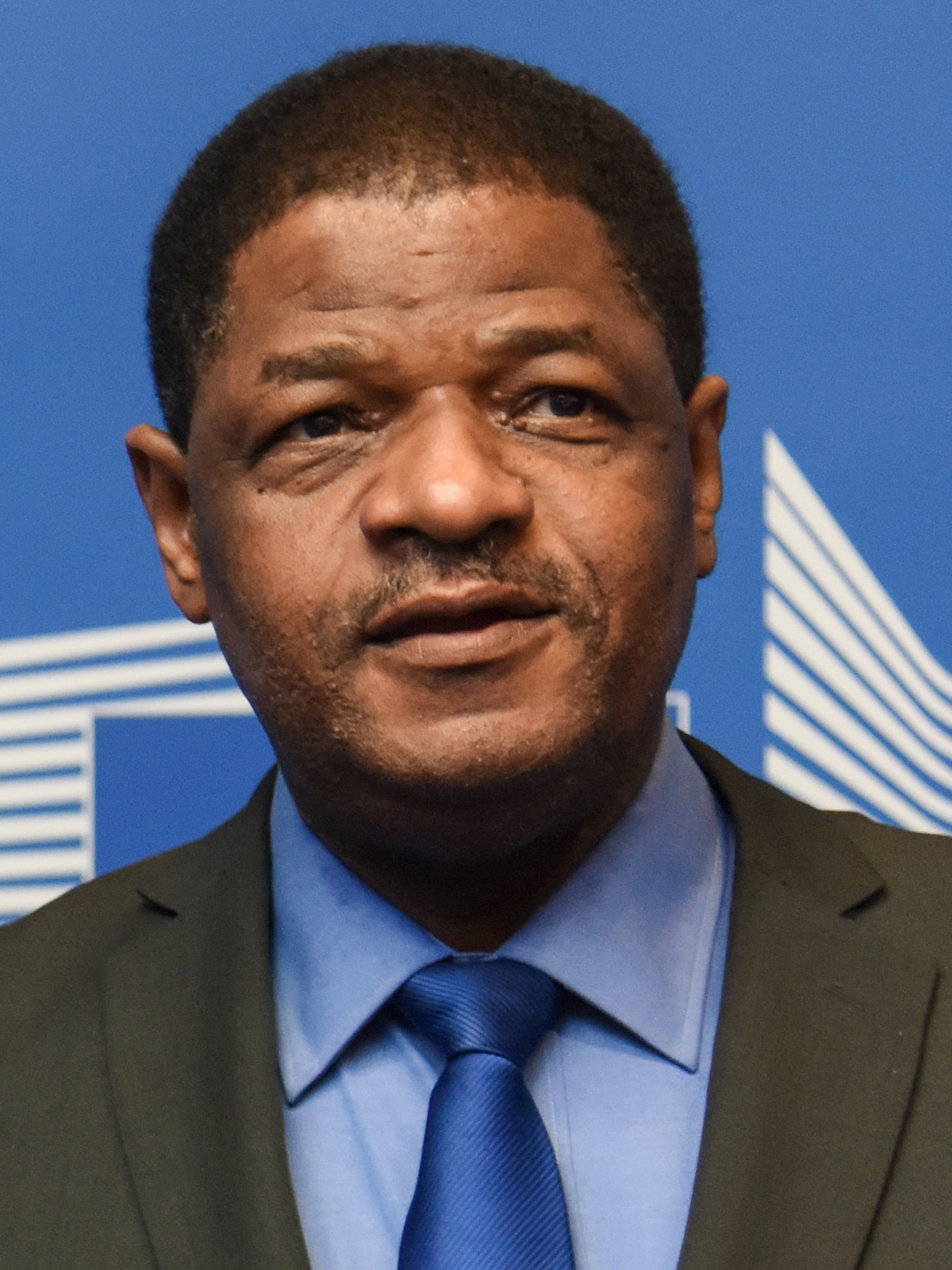

President of the ECOWAS Commission
- In office 8 April 2016 – 28 February 2018
- Preceded by: Kadré Désiré Ouédraogo
- Succeeded by: Jean-Claude Brou

Minister for Development, Economic Analysis and Forecast
- In office May 2011 – June 2015
- President: Thomas Boni Yayi
- Prime Minister: Pascal Koupaki

Personal details
- Born: 30 October 1953 Pobè, Dahomey (now Benin)
- Died: 17 July 2019 (aged 65) Paris, France
- Relatives: Chantal Yayi (sister); Isidore de Souza (uncle); Thomas Boni Yayi (brother-in-law)
- Education: University of Dakar
- Occupation: Politician; banker

Marcel Alain de Souza (30 October 1953 – 17 July 2019) was a Beninese politician and banker. He served as President of the ECOWAS Commission from April 2016 until February 2018. He was Minister for Development, Economic Analysis and Forecast of Benin from May 2011 until June 2015.

== Early life and career ==
Marcel Alain de Souza was born on 30 October 1953 in Pobè. His family was originally of Portuguese descent and centred around Ouidah. He had 10 siblings. His younger sister, Chantal De Souza, a future first lady, later married Beninese President Thomas Boni Yayi, after having met through him. De Souza was a nephew of Archbishop Isidore de Souza. He obtained a master's degree in economics from the University of Dakar. De Souza later obtained a further master's degree in banking and management from the West African Training Centre for Banking Studies. He received further training at the International Monetary Fund.

From the 1970s de Souza worked for the Central Bank of West African States (BCEAO) in Cotonou as internal controller and later as national director for Benin. He later became Director of Administration at the headquarters of the institute in Dakar. During his time at BCEAO de Souza was colleagues with later President Thomas Boni Yayi.

== Political career ==
In 2009 de Souza became chairperson of the Republican Front of Benin. Administratively he held the position of Head of Department of Economic and Financial Affairs in the Office of the President. He later was Special Adviser to the President on Monetary and Banking Affairs. He was spokesperson for President Thomas Boni Yayi for the 2011 Beninese presidential election. From May 2011 until June 2015 he was Minister for Development, Economic Analysis and Forecast under him. De Souza was elected to the National Assembly during the 2015 Beninese parliamentary election.

On 17 December 2015, during the 48th Ordinary Session of the Authority of ECOWAS Heads of State and Government, the post of President of the ECOWAS Commission was allocated to Benin and de Souza was nominated. De Souza publicly disagreed with President Boni Yayi's decision to have Prime Minister Lionel Zinsou be the candidate for the Cowry Forces for an Emerging Benin during March 2016 Beninese presidential election. De Souza ran as a candidate himself in the election for the Republican Front for a Patriotic Alternative, or Front républicain pour une alternative patriotique (Frap), but received only 0.13% of the vote and was not elected. He subsequently supported candidate Patrice Talon in the run-off. Having won the elections, Talon confirmed Boni Yayi's decision to have de Souza be Benin's nominee as President of the ECOWAS Commission. On 8 April 2016 de Souza took over the position from Kadré Désiré Ouédraogo. De Souza subsequently laid down his seat in the National Assembly and was succeeded by Justin Adjovi.

As President of the ECOWAS Commission he had to deal with the poor financial situation of ECOWAS and immediately temporarily suspended travel of staff members to missions, seminars and workshops outside of the Abuja ECOWAS headquarters. He also limited the staff attendance to statutory ECOWAS meetings. During his time in office he had to deal with the 2016–2017 Gambian constitutional crisis. In October 2017 he showed hesitation about the pace of ECOWAS its goal of having a single currency by 2020. His term in office ended on 28 February 2018. He was succeeded by Jean-Claude Brou.

He died of cardiac arrest on 17 July 2019 in Paris, France, aged 65.

Political offices
Preceded by Kadré Désiré Ouédraogo	President of the ECOWAS Commission; 2016–2018	Succeeded by Jean-Claude Brou
