= Alliance for a Democratic Dynamic =

Political coalition for the 2007 Beninese parliamentary election

The Alliance for a Democratic Dynamic (French: Alliance pour une Dynamique Démocratique) was an opposition alliance of Benin which contested the Beninese parliamentary election of 2007.

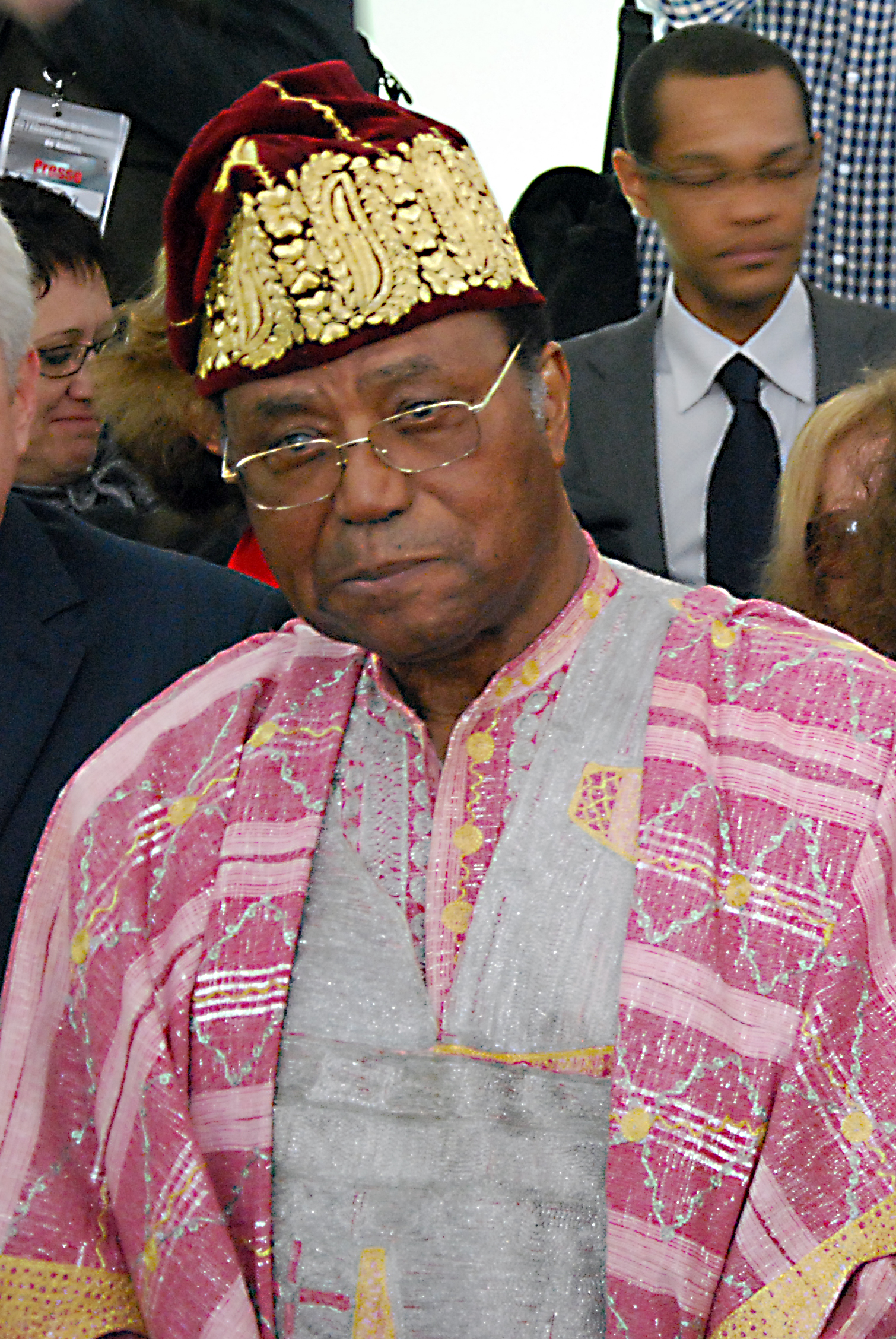
Nicéphore Soglo, head of the ADD and former Beninese president

The coalition was headed by the former President of Benin, Nicéphore Soglo. It comprised the Social Democratic Party of Bruno Amoussou, the Renaissance Party of Benin of Soglo's wife Rosine Vieyra Soglo, and the African Movement for Development and Progress of Antoine Kolawolé Idji.

The alliance won 20 out of 83 seats, the second-most seats behind only the pro-President Yayi coalition, Cowry Forces for an Emerging Benin. However, this was a decrease from the 34 seats won by the three parties in the Beninese parliamentary election of 2003, when the SDP was part of the pro-government Union for Future Benin.

The alliance was superseded by an expanded coalition, Union Makes the Nation, in time for the parliamentary and presidential election of 2011. That coalition won 30 seats in the 2011 election.
