= Léhady Soglo =

Beninese politician (born 1960)

Léhady Vinagnon Soglo (born December 18, 1960) is a Beninese politician and economist. He was Mayor of Cotonou from 2015 until his dismissal in 2017.

Born in Paris, Soglo is the son of Nicéphore Soglo, the former President of Benin from 1991 to 1996, and Rosine Vieyra Soglo, the former First Lady of Benin and founder of the Benin Rebirth Party.

He was the candidate of the Benin Rebirth Party (RB) in the March 2006 presidential election, in which his father was barred from running due to a maximum age limit on candidates. He is an economist by training, with a degree from the University of Montréal.

In the March 2007 parliamentary election, he was elected to the National Assembly of Benin as a candidate of the Alliance for a Dynamic Democracy, which included the RB.

After serving as his father's deputy while the latter was Mayor of Cotonou, Léhady Soglo succeeded his father as Mayor on 14 August 2015. He was dismissed from his position as Mayor of Cotonou by the national Council of Ministers on August 2, 2017, and has lived in exile in France since his removal from office.
