= Comité catholique contre la faim et pour le développement =

Catholic Committee against hunger and for development
- Comité catholique contre la faim et pour le développement
- Abbreviation: CCFD-Terre Solidaire
- Formation: 1961
- Dissolved: NGO
- Purpose: Humanitarian
- Location: 4 Rue Jean Lantier, 75001 Paris, France
- Coordinates: 48.858475°N 2.346772°E
- Region served: Worldwide
- Official language: French
- President: Guy Aurenche
- Treasurer: Pierre-Yves Crochet-Damais
- Secretary: Jacques Matthys
- Main organ: Board of directors: Jean-Claude Chaussee; Jean-Paul Corriette; Françoise Hibon; Pierre Lajarige; Jérôme Cailleau; Alice Barthelemy; Thérèse Delforge; André Briquet; François Lamy
- Affiliations: Catholic Church
- Staff: 170
- Website: ccfd-terresolidaire.org

The Catholic Committee against hunger and for development (CCFD-Terre Solidaire; French: Comité catholique contre la faim et pour le développement) is a French Catholic humanitarian aid non-governmental organization. Agnès Adjaho previously served as its director for Africa.
