= 1996 Beninese presidential election =

Election of Mathieu Kérékou

- 3 March 1996 (first round); 18 March 1996 (second round)
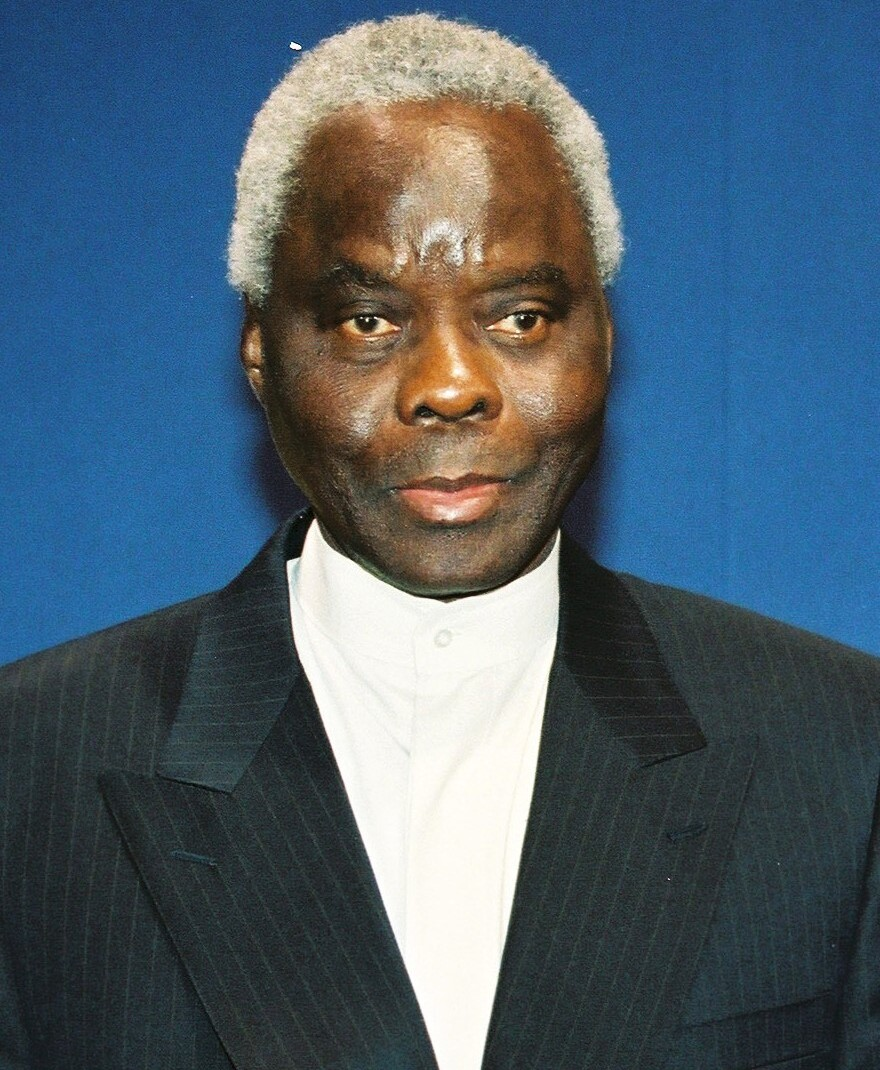

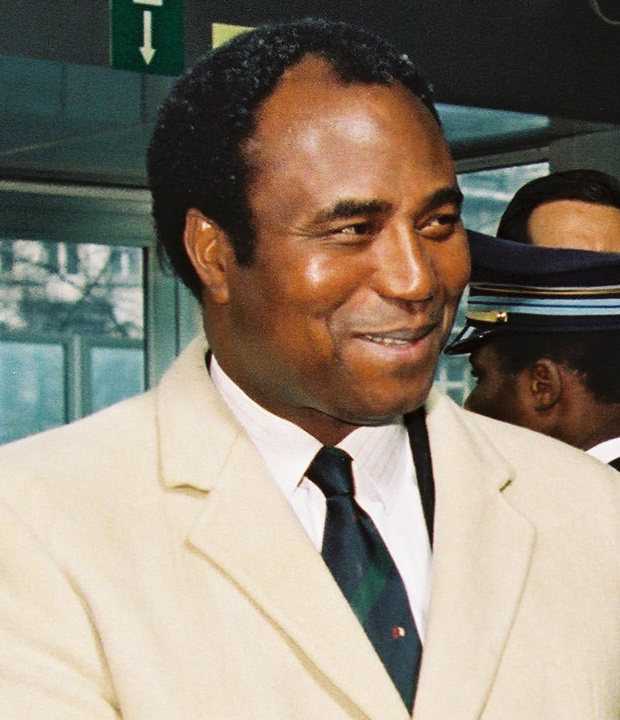
Candidate	Mathieu Kérékou	Nicéphore Soglo
Party	Independent	RB
Popular vote	999,453	904,626
Percentage	52.49%	47.51%
President before election
Nicéphore Soglo
UTRD
Elected President
Mathieu Kérékou
Independent

Presidential elections were held in Benin in March 1996. The first round, held on 3 March (or 4 March), saw no candidate gain over 50% of the vote, resulting in a second round held on 18 March. Mathieu Kérékou, a former military dictator who had come second in the first round, was victorious in the second round, beating incumbent Nicéphore Soglo, after gaining the backing of the third- and fourth-placed candidates. Kérékou received very strong support from northern voters, but he also improved his performance in the south compared to the 1991 election.

Soglo alleged fraud, but this was rejected by the Constitutional Court (who had annulled 22% of the votes in the first round), which confirmed Kérékou's victory. Voter turnout was 88% in the first round and 78% in the second round.

== Results ==
Candidate	Party	First round		Second round	
Candidate	Party	Votes	%	Votes	%
Nicéphore Soglo	Benin Rebirth Party	596,371	35.69	904,626	47.51
Mathieu Kérékou	Independent	567,084	33.94	999,453	52.49
Adrien Houngbédji	Democratic Renewal Party	329,364	19.71		
Bruno Amoussou	Social Democratic Party	129,731	7.76		
Pascal Fantodji	Communist Party of Benin	17,977	1.08		
Lionel Agbo	Independent	15,418	0.92		
Léandre Djagoué	Independent	15,079	0.90		
Total		1,671,024	100.00	1,904,079	100.00
Valid votes		1,671,024	75.55	1,904,079	97.20
Invalid/blank votes		540,653	24.45	54,776	2.80
Total votes		2,211,677	100.00	1,958,855	100.00
Registered voters/turnout		2,517,970	87.84	2,524,262	77.60
Source: Nohlen et al.
