= Zinvié =

- Arrondissement and town
- Location in Benin
- Coordinates: 6°37′N 2°21′E
- Country: Benin
- Department: Atlantique Department
- Commune: Abomey-Calavi

Population (2013)
  - Total: 18,157
- Time zone: UTC+1 (WAT)

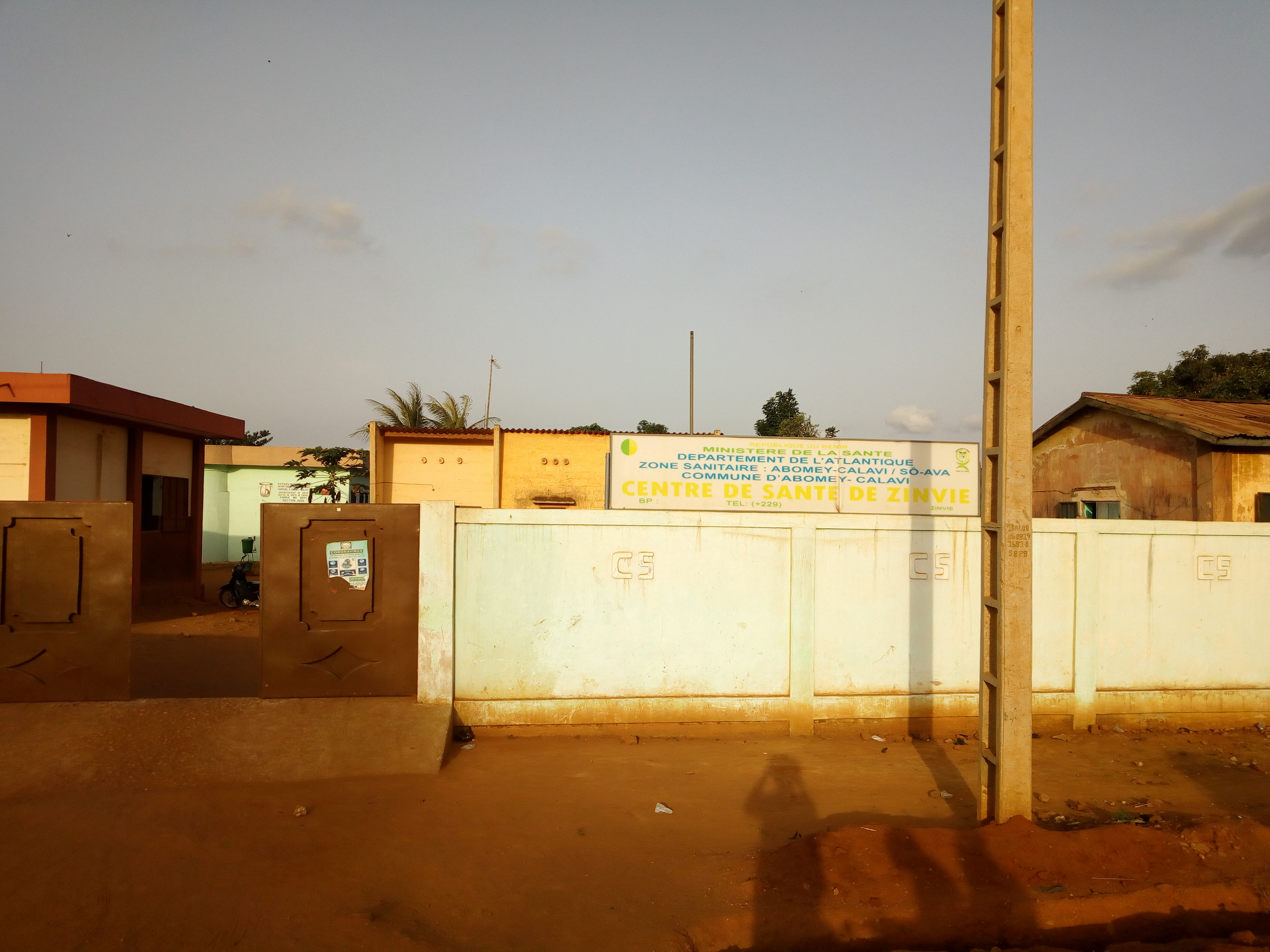
Health Centre in Zinvié.

Zinvié is a town and arrondissement in the Atlantique Department of southern Benin. It is an administrative division under the jurisdiction of the commune of Abomey-Calavi. According to the population census conducted by the Institut National de la Statistique Benin on May 11, 2013, the arrondissement had a total population of 18,157. The area contains swampy forest.
