= Benin Rebirth Party =

Political party in Benin

Benin Rebirth Party Parti de la renaissance du Bénin
- Founder: Rosine Vieyra Soglo
- Founded: 24 March 1992
- Ideology: Liberalism; Neoliberalism

The Benin Rebirth Party (French: Parti de la renaissance du Bénin) is a liberal political party in Benin. The party was founded on 24 March 1992 by then-First Lady Rosine Vieyra Soglo, who became the first Beninese woman to establish a new political party. The party was also headed by Vieyra Soglo after its foundation. It is led by Nicéphore Soglo, who was President of Benin from 1991 to 1996 and later Mayor of Cotonou.

Rosine Vieyra Soglo established the party to provide political support for her husband, then-President Nicéphore Soglo, who lacked backing from Benin's political elite. It initially worked, as the Benin Rebirth Party won 20 of the 83 seats in the National Assembly in the 1995 Beninese parliamentary election. However, President Nicéphore Soglo, who was seeking re-election, was defeated by former President Mathieu Kérékou in the 1996 Beninese presidential election.

Soglo was the RB candidate in the March 2001 presidential election, taking second place with 27.1% of the popular vote in the first round, but he boycotted the second round. In the parliamentary election held on 30 March 2003, the party won 15 out of 83 seats.

In early August 2005, the RB chose Soglo's son Lehady Soglo as its candidate for the March 2006 presidential election. The elder Soglo could not run because of the constitutional age limit of 70 years for candidates. In the election, Lehady Soglo obtained 7.92% of the vote and placed fourth.

In the March 2007 parliamentary election, the RB participated in the Alliance for a Dynamic Democracy, which won a total of 20 seats.
