= Central Bank of West African States =

Supranational central bank in Africa

Central Bank of West African States Banque centrale des États de l'Afrique de l'Ouest (BCEAO)

- BCEAO headquarters in Dakar, Senegal
- Central bank of: West African Economic and Monetary Union
- Headquarters: Dakar, Senegal
- Established: 1959
- Governor: Jean-Claude Brou
- Currency: West African CFA franc XOF (ISO 4217)
- Reserves: 9.82 billion USD
- Preceded by: Banque de l'Afrique Occidentale (1901-1955); Institut d'émission de l'Afrique occidentale française et du Togo (1955-1959)
- Website: bceao.int

BCEAO is the central bank of the states in green

The Central Bank of West African States (French: Banque centrale des États de l'Afrique de l'Ouest, BCEAO) is a central bank serving the eight west African countries which share the common West African CFA franc currency and comprise the West African Economic and Monetary Union.

The BCEAO is active in developing financial inclusion policy and is a member of the Alliance for Financial Inclusion.

== History ==
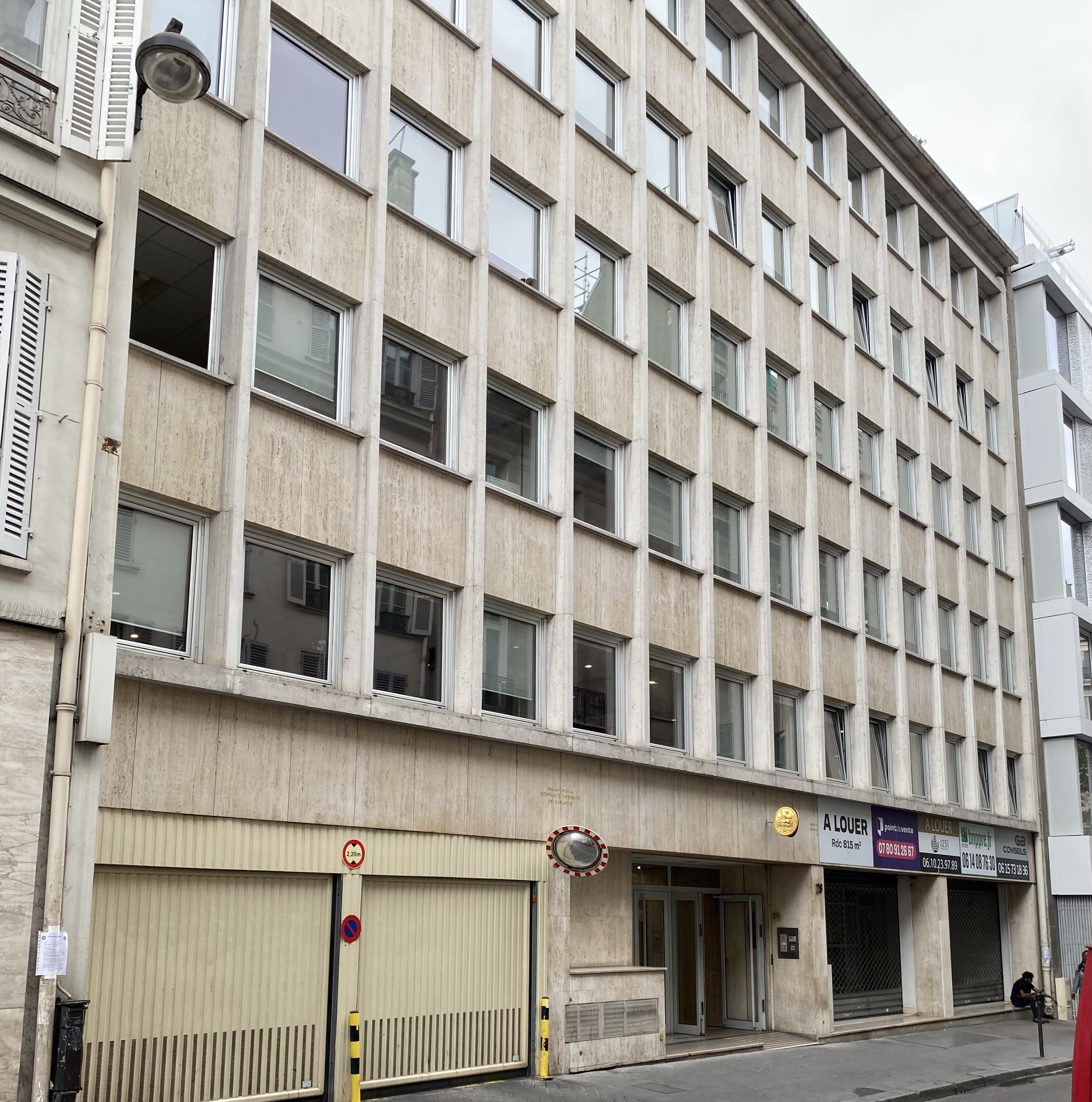
Building at 29, rue du Colisée in Paris, head office of BCEAO from the early 1960s to relocation to Dakar in 1978

In 1955, the French government transferred the note-issuance privilege for its West African colonies, hitherto held by the Banque de l'Afrique Occidentale, to a newly created entity based in Paris, the Institut d'émission de l'Afrique occidentale française et du Togo. In 1959, the latter's name was changed to BCEAO.

The treaty establishing the West African Monetary Union was signed on 12 May 1962 and gave BCEAO the exclusive right to issue currency as the common central bank for the, then, seven member countries: Côte d'Ivoire, the Republic of Dahomey (later renamed Benin), Haute-Volta (later renamed Burkina Faso), Mali, Mauritania, Niger, and Senegal. The statutes of the bank were subsequently approved in November 1962 and remained essentially unchanged until 1974, providing for dominant French influence over the BCEAO's governance.

On 30 June 1962, Mali left the group and adopted the Malian franc as national currency. On 17 December 1963, Togo officially joined the UMOA. On 30 May 1973, Mauritania withdrew and adopted the ouguiya as national currency. On 17 February 1984, Mali re-joined the UMOA. Guinea-Bissau joined the group in 1997.

In 1975, the BCEAO was led for the first time by an African Governor, Ivorian Abdoulaye Fadiga. It remained headquartered in Paris until mid-1978, when its head office was relocated to Dakar. The Dakar headquarters was formally inaugurated on 26 May 1979. In 1994, the UMOA framework was reformed and rebranded as UEMOA.

The BCEAO's statutes were amended in 2010 to grant it greater independence from member states.

In August 2025, the BCEAO announced the launch of the E-CFA, and the creation of an instant payment platform called "Pi-Spi".

== Banking Commission ==
In 1989, BCEAO Governor Alassane Ouattara promoted the creation of a single banking supervisory authority for the entire West African Monetary Union. The Banking Commission of the West African Monetary Union was subsequently established by an international convention signed in Ouagadougou on 24 April 1990

== UMOA-Titres ==
In 2012, the West African Monetary Union's Council of Ministers authorized the BCEAO to create a regional agency to support the issuance and management of their public securities (French: titres). The agency was formally created on 15 March 2013 under the name UMOA-Titres. Since then, UMOA-Titres has coordinated most of the member states' government debt issuance.

== Member states ==
- Benin
- Burkina Faso
- Guinea Bissau
- Ivory Coast
- Mali
- Niger
- Senegal
- Togo

== Buildings ==
The BCEAO has a main branch, known as agency, in the largest city of each of the member states, whose building typically dominates the local skyline. In Dakar, the BCEAO's headquarters is in a high-rise building separate from the agency for Senegal. In addition, the BCEAO has branches in Parakou (Benin), Bobo-Dioulasso (Burkina Faso), Abengourou, Bouaké, Daloa, Korhogo, Man and San-Pédro (Côte d'Ivoire), Mopti and Sikasso (Mali), Maradi and Zinder (Niger), Kaolack and Ziguinchor (Senegal), and Kara (Togo). In Paris, the BCEAO maintains a representative office in its former headquarters building at 29, rue du Colisée.

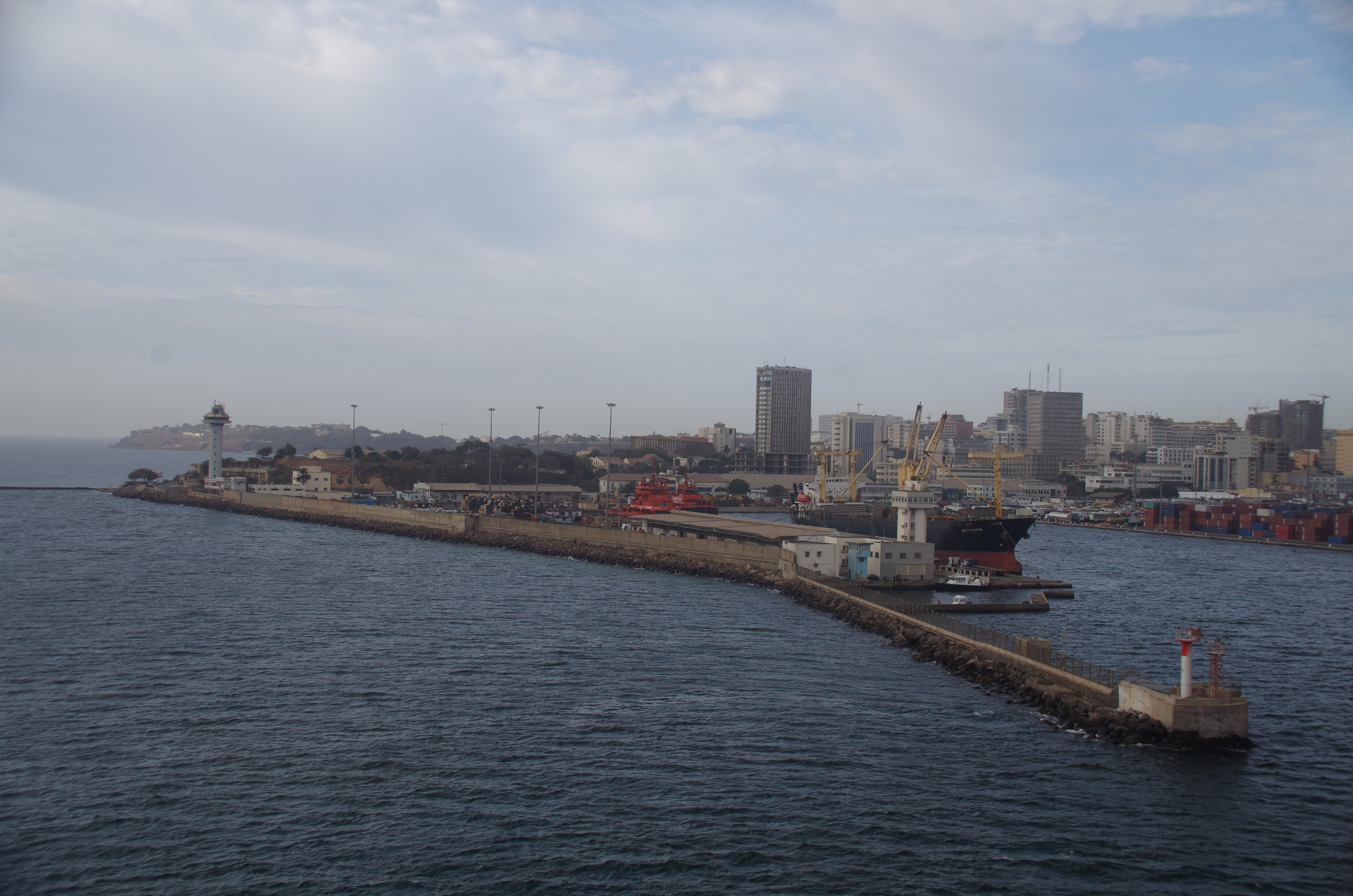
BCEAO headquarters tower in Dakar (center)

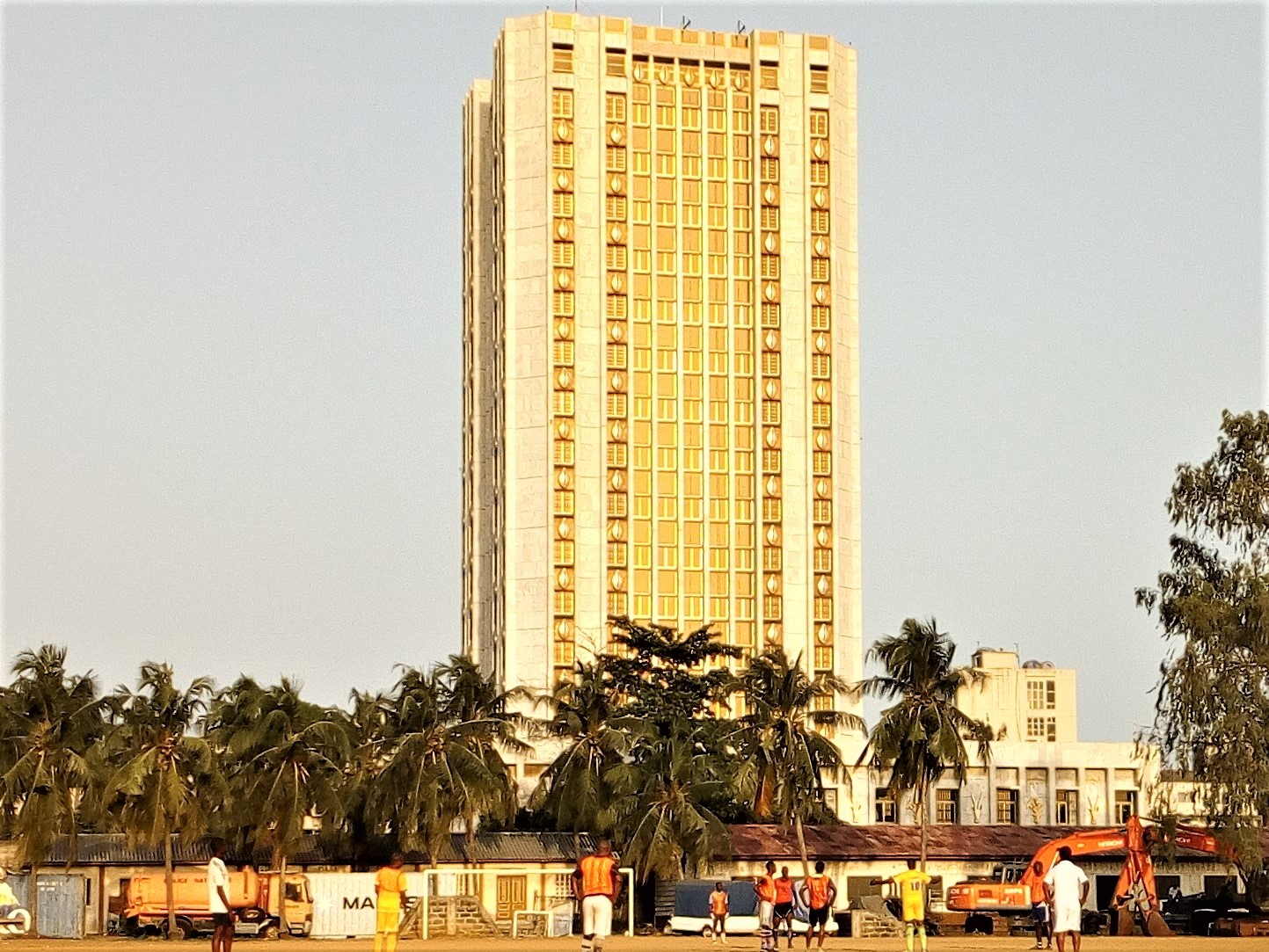
Benin Agency in Cotonou

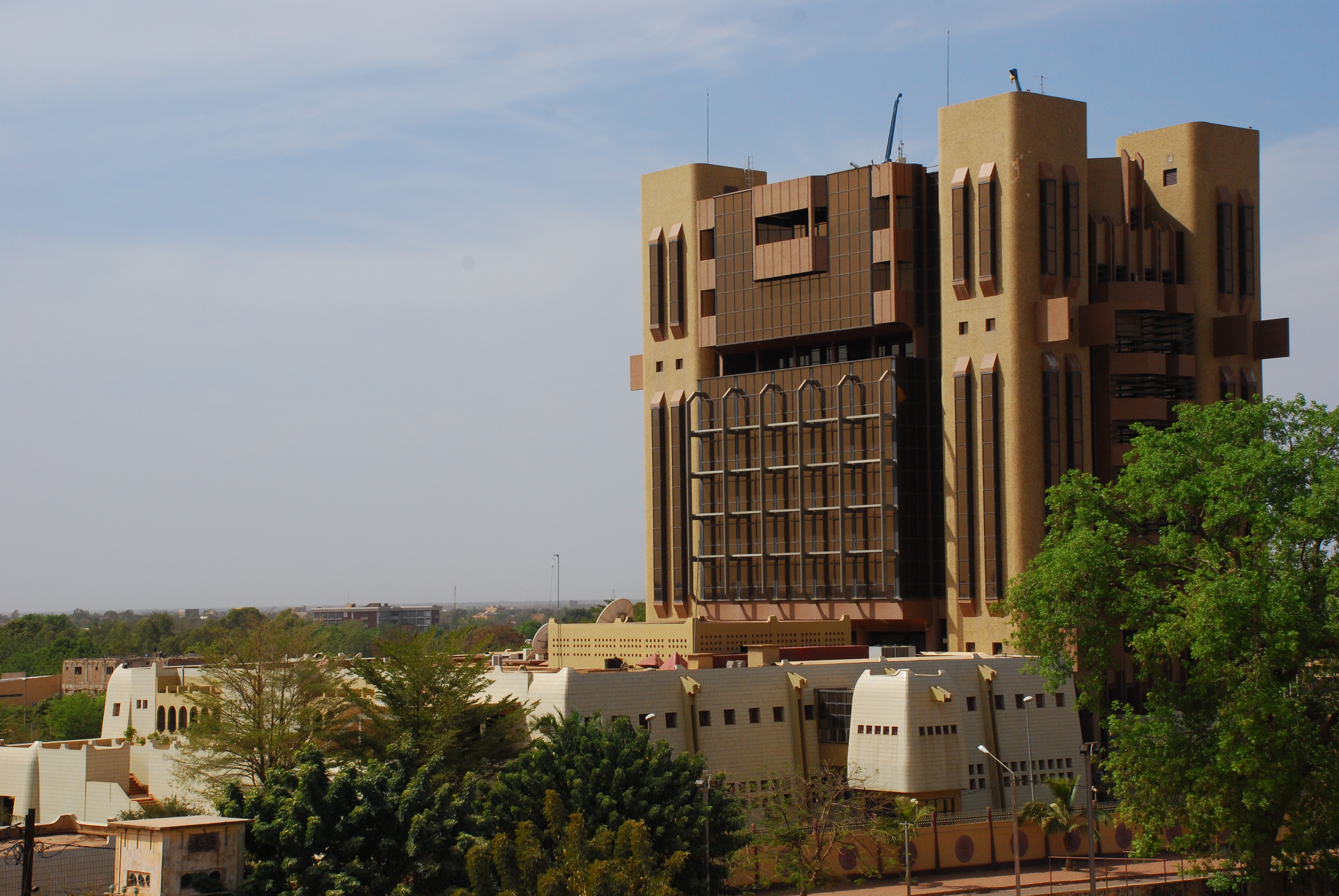
Burkina Faso Agency in Ouagadougou

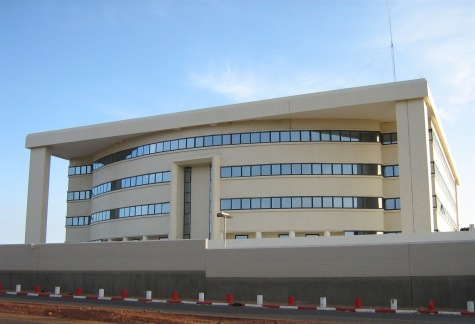
Guinea-Bissau Agency in Bissau

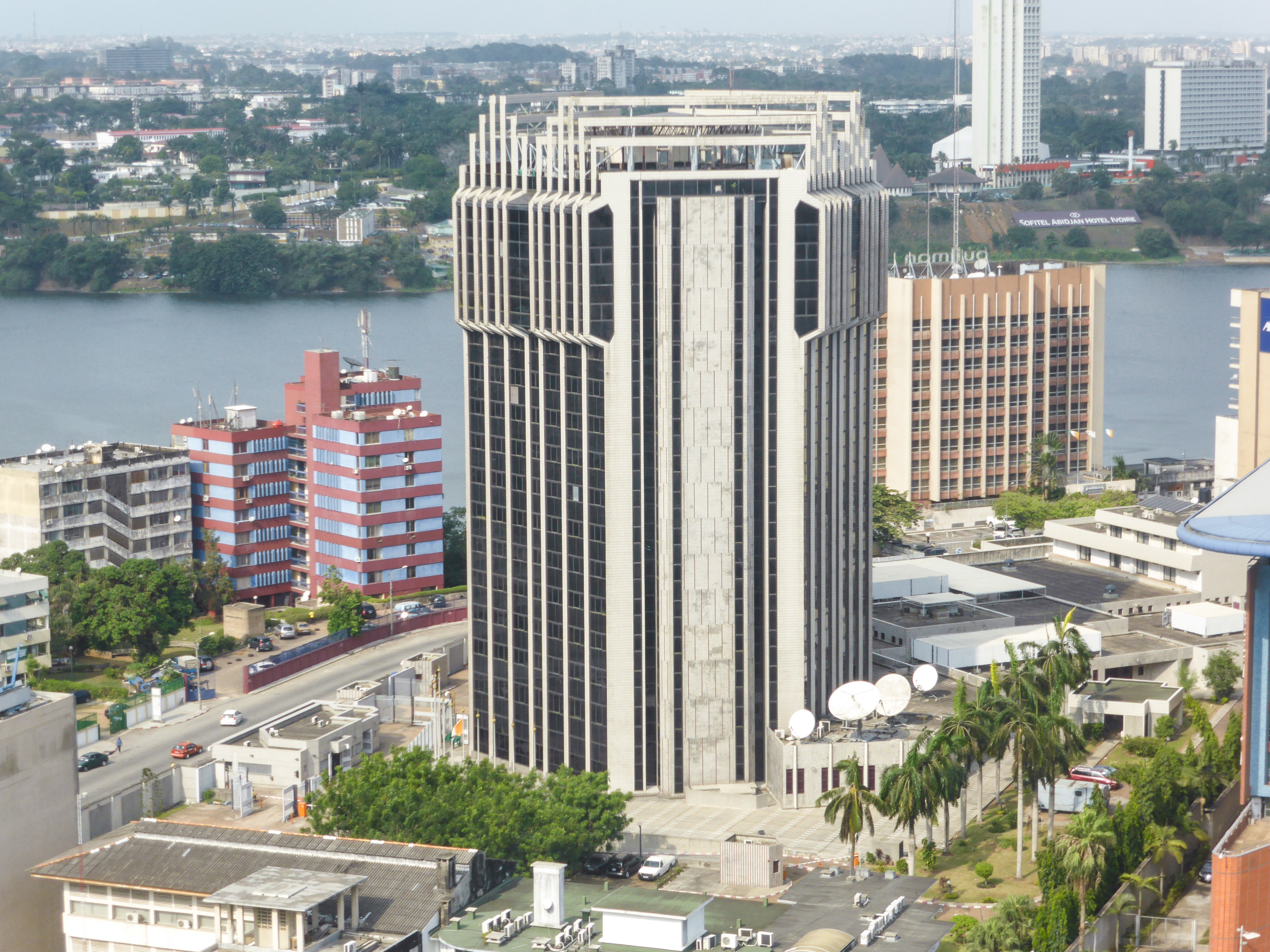
Ivory Coast Agency in Abidjan

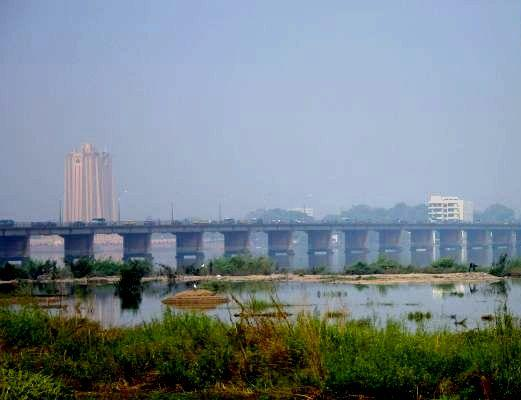
Mali Agency in Bamako (left)

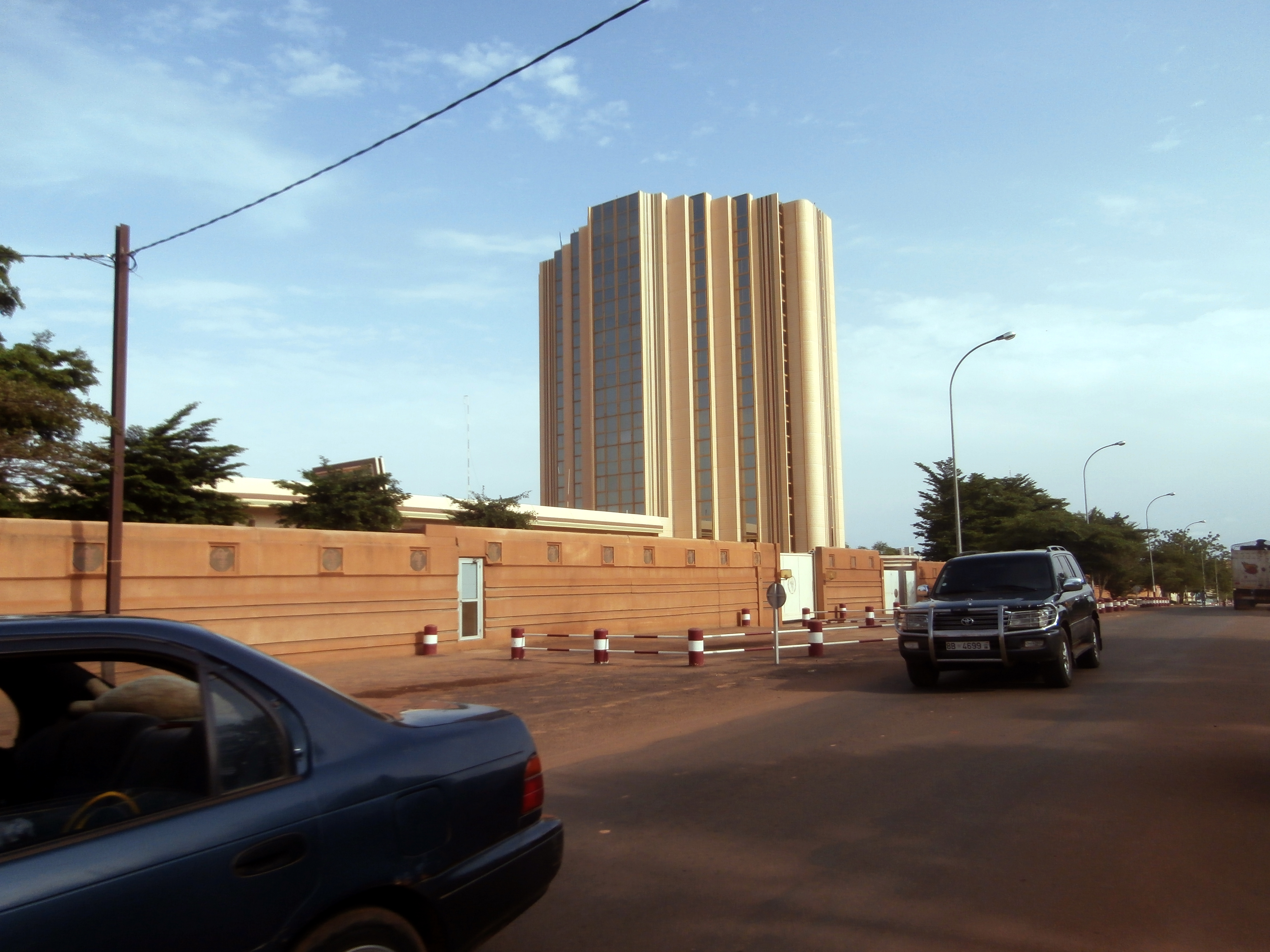
Niger Agency in Niamey

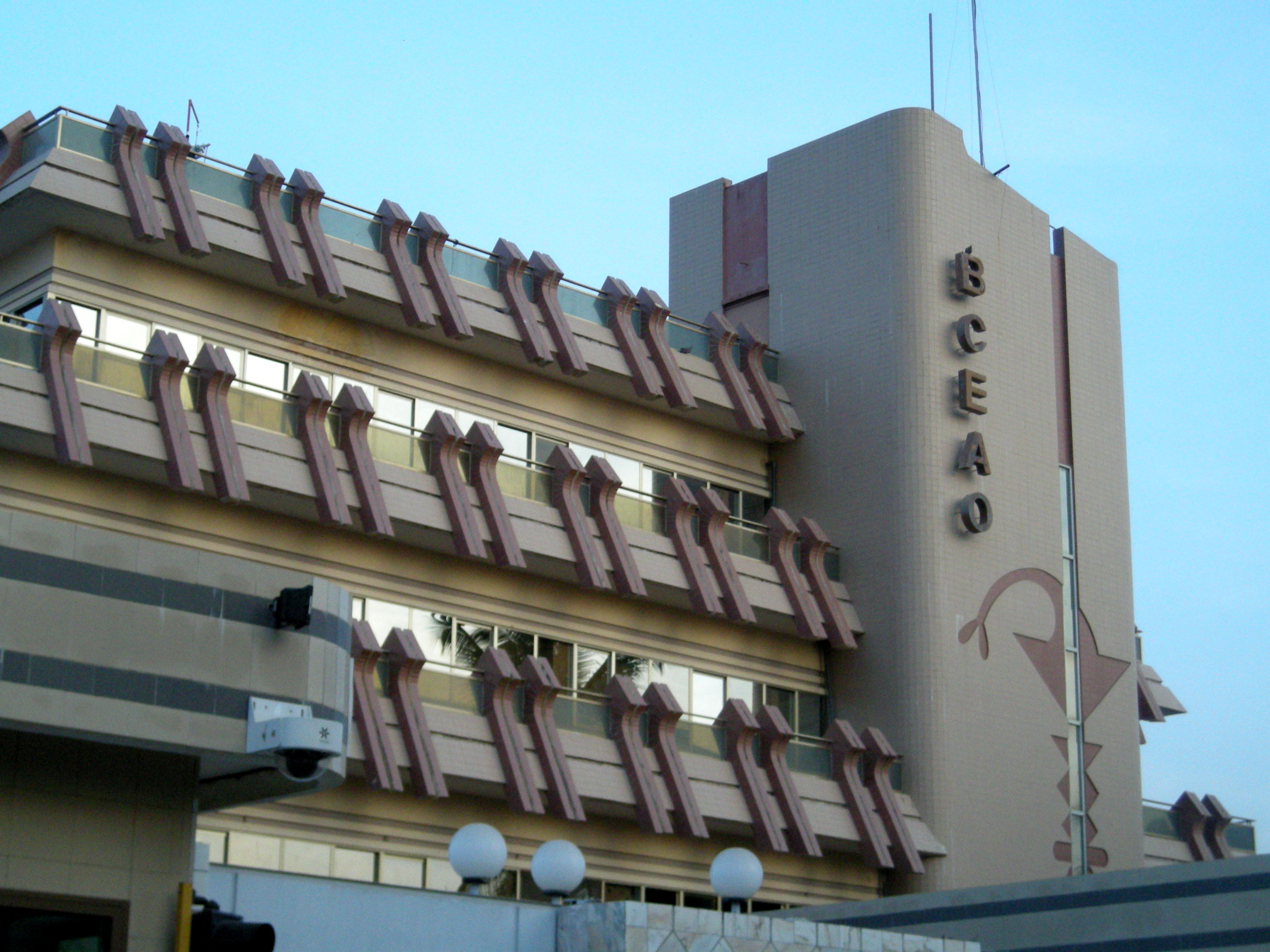
Branch building in Ziguinchor, Senegal

== Leadership ==
Robert Julienne, a French national, was chief executive (French: directeur général) of the Institut d’émission, then of the BCEAO from 1955 to 1974, after which the bank's head held the title of Governor.

- Abdoulaye Fadiga, Governor 1975–1988
- Alassane Ouattara, Governor 1988–1990
- Charles Konan Banny, Governor 1990–2005
- Justin Damo Baro, Governor 2006–2008
- Philippe-Henri Dakoury-Tabley, Governor 2008–2011
- Jean-Baptiste Compaoré, Governor in 2011
- Tiémoko Meyliet Koné, Governor 2011–2022
- Jean-Claude Brou, Governor 2022–

== See also ==
- Bank of Central African States
- Central banks and currencies of Africa
- List of central banks
