= Soglio =

Soglio may refer to:

- Soglio, Piedmont, a comune in the Province of Asti, Italy
- Soglio, Switzerland, a municipality in the canton of Graubünden
