= First Lady of Benin =

Wife of the President of Benin

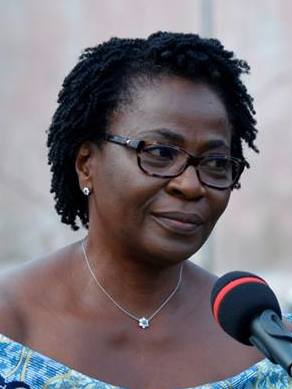
- Incumbent; Claudine Talon since April 6, 2016
- Residence: Palais de la Marina, Cotonou
- Inaugural holder: Marie do Régo
- Formation: August 1, 1960

First Lady of Benin (French: Première Dame de la République de Bénin) is the title attributed to the wife of the President of Benin. Claudine Talon, wife of Patrice Talon, became first lady on her husband's election as president on April 6, 2016. There had been no "first gentleman", or its equivalent, as of 2023.

== History and role ==
Prior to 1975, when the country's name was changed from the Republic of Dahomey to Benin, the holder of the position was known as the First Lady of Dahomey or wife of the president of Dahomey.

Under the Constitution of Benin, adopted at the National Conference in Cotonou in February 1990, the first lady has no set, official role in government. According to Dodji Amouzouvi, a sociologist and political scientist, "Benin has not yet constitutionalized the role of First Lady. No text yet clearly defines the powers they must have." Instead, a set of customs, protocols, and norms govern the roles and responsibilities of Benin's first ladies. Though the role is not recognized in Beninese law, the first lady has diplomatic, social and political obligations within Beninese politics and society. The first lady often focuses on issues related to socio-economic, education, and healthcare. She will accompany the president on domestic and international trips.

First ladies since Benin's transition from dictatorship to a multi-party system are: Rosine Vieyra Soglo (1991–1996), Marguerite Kérékou (1996–2006), Chantal Yayi (2006–2016), and Claudine Talon (since 2016).

The modern Beninese first ladies have entered politics and other arenas. For example, in 1992 then-First Lady Rosine Vieyra Soglo founded the Benin Rebirth Party (RB) to help garner political support for her husband and his political goals, becoming the first Beninese woman to establish a political party. Vieyra Soglo's successor(and predecessor), Marguerite Kérékou, had a lower profile, but remained a confidante and advisor to her husband, President Mathieu Kérékou. Chantal Yayi, first lady from 2006 to 2016, assisted her older brother, Marcel de Souza, with the creation of a new party.

== First Ladies of Benin ==
Names	Portrait	Term Began	Term Ended	President of Benin	Notes
Marie do Régo		August 1, 1960	October 22, 1963	Hubert Maga	Inaugural First Lady of the Republic of Dahomey. Maga married Marie do Régo, a Catholic nurse from Ouidah, in 1939. The couple had three daughters and two sons. During her tenure as first lady, do Régo headed a women's organization called le Groupement des Femmes Dahoméennes (GFD), which was created in 1961. She died in 2007.
Paule Soglo		October 28, 1963	January 25, 1964	Christophe Soglo	Colonel Christophe Soglo came to power in the 1963 Dahomeyan coup d'état. His wife, Paule Soglo, died in 2003.
?		January 25, 1964	November 27, 1965	Sourou-Migan Apithy	Apithy was married.
?		January 25, 1964	November 29, 1965	Justin Ahomadégbé-Tomêtin	Ahomadégbé was married.
?		November 29, 1965	December 22, 1965	Tahirou Congacou	
Paule Soglo		December 22, 1965	December 19, 1967	Christophe Soglo	Former First Lady Paule Soglo died in 2003. Christophe Soglo removed President Congacou in the 1967 Dahomeyan coup d'état and was later deposed on December 19, 1967.
?		December 18, 1967	December 19, 1967	Jean-Baptiste Hachème	Brief military ruler of Benin. Wife unknown.
?		December 20, 1967	December 21, 1967	Maurice Kouandété	Military ruler
?		December 21, 1967	July 17, 1968	Alphonse Alley	Military ruler
Florence Atayi Guy Gaspard		July 17, 1968	December 10, 1969	Émile Derlin Zinsou	President Derlin Zinsou was married to the late Florence Atayi Guy Gaspard. He was deposed in the 1969 Dahomeyan coup d'état.
?		December 10, 1969	December 13, 1969	Maurice Kouandété	Military ruler
Françoise De Souza		December 13, 1969	May 7, 1970	Paul-Émile de Souza	Former Dahomey first lady Françoise De Souza died on July 30, 2015.
Marie do Régo		May 7, 1970	May 7, 1972	Hubert Maga	Second tenure as first lady during the Presidential Council.
?		May 7, 1972	October 26, 1972	Justin Ahomadégbé-Tomêtin	Wife became first lady during the Presidential Council. Husband overthrown in a military coup on October 26, 1972, ending the council.
Symphorose Béatrice Lakoussan (divorced); Marguerite Kérékou(later)		October 26, 1972	April 4, 1991	Mathieu Kérékou	Kérékou seized power in the 1972 Dahomeyan coup d'état. In 1975, he changed the name of the country from Dahomey to the People's Republic of Benin. It became the Republic of Benin in 1990. Kérékou had several polygamous wives and relationships, which produced at least ten children. He rarely appeared in public with any wife during his first tenure in office (1972–1991). Kérékou divorced his wife, Symphorose Béatrice Lakoussan, who later became a national deputy, at some point during his first tenure. Lakoussan stated she disapproved of Kérékou's 1972 coup and his anti-democratic policies, stating "His accession to power was a surprise for me." Kérékou later designated his wife, Marguerite (née Midjo) Kérékou, as First Lady of Benin, especially during his second tenure as president (1996–2006).
Rosine Vieyra Soglo		April 4, 1991	April 4, 1996	Nicéphore Soglo	Rosine Vieyra Soglo was Benin's first First Lady of the country's democratic era. In 1992, First Lady Vieyra Soglo created the Benin Rebirth Party (RB), becoming the first Beninese woman to found a political party. She later served in the National Assembly of Benin from 1999 to 2019 and the Pan-African Parliament from 2004 to 2009.
Marguerite Kérékou		April 4, 1996	April 6, 2006	Mathieu Kérékou	Mathieu Kérékou rarely appeared in public with any wife during his first tenure in office (1972–1991). However, he designated his wife, Marguerite (née Midjo) Kérékou, as First Lady of Benin, from 1996 to 2006 during his second tenure in a more public role. Marguerite Kérékou is originally from Ouidah.
Chantal de Souza Yayi		April 6, 2006	April 6, 2016	Thomas Boni Yayi	Yayi is a native of Ouidah.
Claudine Talon		April 6, 2016	Present	Patrice Talon	Born Claudine Gbènagnon. Incumbent First Lady of Benin since 2016.
