= Nicéphore Soglo =

Beninese politician

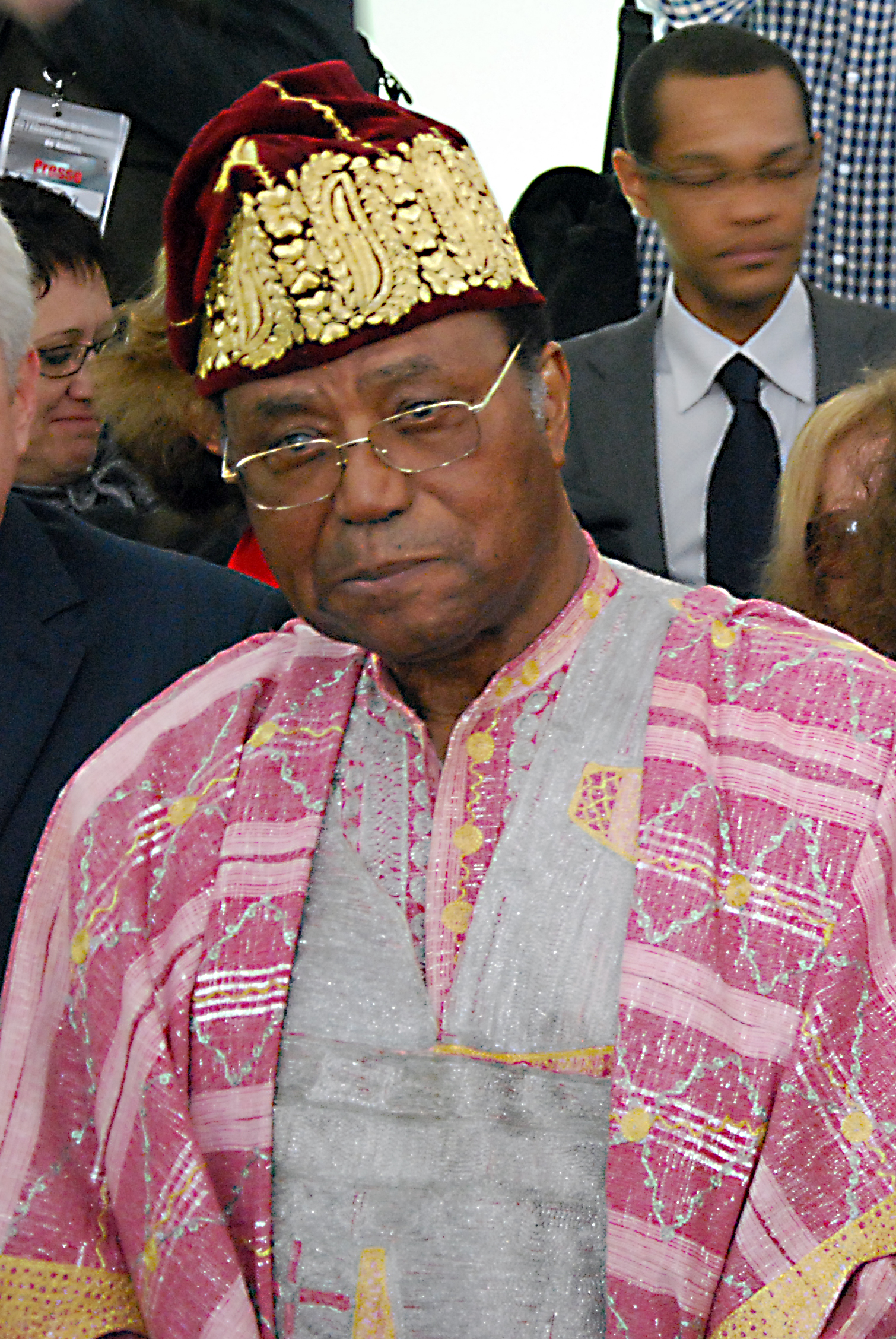
- Soglo in 2012

6th President of Benin
- In office 4 April 1991 – 4 April 1996
- Preceded by: Mathieu Kérékou
- Succeeded by: Mathieu Kérékou

Prime Minister of Benin
- In office 12 March 1990 – 4 April 1991
- Preceded by: Maurice Kouandété (1968)
- Succeeded by: Adrien Houngbédji (1996)

Personal details
- Born: 29 November 1934 (age 91) Badou, French Togoland
- Party: Renaissance Party of Benin
- Spouse: Rosine Vieyra Soglo (m. 1958; died 2021)
- Children: Léhady Soglo; Ganiou Soglo
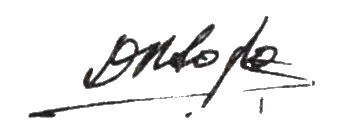
- Signature

Nicéphore Dieudonné Soglo (born 29 November 1934) is a Beninese politician who was Prime Minister of Benin from 1990 to 1991 and President from 1991 to 1996. He was Mayor of Cotonou from 2003 to 2015. Soglo was married to Rosine Vieyra Soglo.

== Biography ==
Soglo was born in French Togoland. He studied law and economics at the University of Paris and the École nationale d'administration. Soglo met his future wife, a Beninese student named Rosine Vieyra, in 1947, while both were studying in France as teenagers. The couple married on 2 July 1958. They had two sons, Léhady (born 1960) and Ganiou Soglo (born 1962).

After receiving degrees in law and economics from the University of Paris, Soglo returned to Benin (then called Dahomey) and was the inspector of finance (1965–1967) before his cousin, Colonel Christophe Soglo, overthrew President Sourou-Migan Apithy and appointed his relative, Nicéphore, as minister of finance and economic affairs. Following the 1972 coup that brought Mathieu Kérékou to power, he left the country and held positions at international organizations such as the International Monetary Fund (IMF) and the World Bank.

In the late 1980s, faced with growing dissatisfaction over a stagnant economy, the Kérékou government agreed to convene a national conference that would lead the country towards multiparty democracy. The conference designated Nicéphore Soglo Prime Minister, and he took office on 12 March 1990. The conference produced a constitution that was overwhelmingly approved in a referendum held on 2 December 1990.

In the country's first multiparty presidential election, Soglo took first place in the first round, held on 10 March 1991, with 36.31% of the vote. A run-off against Kérékou followed on 24 March in which Soglo won a strong majority, receiving 67.73% of the vote—the first time that an opposition candidate in post-colonial Francophone Africa had won an election. He took office on 4 April 1991.

In the following year, the Renaissance Party of Benin (known by the acronym PRB or RB) was founded by Rosine Vieyra Soglo; her husband became leader of the party in 1994.

In 1993, President Soglo headed the Benin delegation which participated in the first Tokyo International Conference on African Development.

During his presidency, Soglo took efforts to refurbish Benin's devastated economy. These economic measures caused civil unrest and undermined his popularity. Despite these problems, his government was praised for its adherence to democratic principles and respect for human rights. He advocated for economic liberalization, like privatization and deregulation. His economic advisor embraced neoliberalism. Soglo also began to embrace neoliberal policies.

In the March 1996 presidential election, Soglo again took first place in the first round, but in the second round he was defeated by Mathieu Kérékou, receiving 47.51% of the vote. Soglo alleged election fraud, but this was rejected by the Constitutional Court.

In a bid to regain the presidency in the March 2001 election, he placed second behind Mathieu Kérékou, winning 27.12% of the vote. Although Soglo qualified to participate in a run-off against Kérékou, he withdrew alleging irregularities, which resulted in a Kérékou victory. Soglo could not run again in the March 2006 presidential election due to the age limit of 70 years; his son Lehady Soglo ran as the candidate of the Renaissance Party instead, placing fourth with 8.44% of the vote. Another son, Ganiou, also ran in the election, but he fared poorly, receiving around 0.17% of the vote.

Nicéphore Soglo and the RB were victorious in the December 2002–January 2003 municipal election in Cotonou, Benin's largest city. In the 12th arrondissement, Soglo defeated pro-government Movement candidate Sévérin Adjovi. Soglo was elected as Mayor by the city's council on 13 February 2003, receiving the support of 41 of the 45 councillors, and he was sworn in on the same day. He said that he would focus on reducing pollution and improving waste management and drainage.

While hospitalized at the American Hospital of Paris, located in Neuilly-sur-Seine, Soglo was falsely reported to have died in February 2005. Along with former United States President Jimmy Carter, Soglo headed the multinational delegation of the National Democratic Institute and the Carter Center for the October 2005 Liberian election.

Soglo ran for re-election as a municipal councillor in the April 2008 local election in Cotonou; he was also the RB candidate for Mayor, vowing to continue to modernize the city and create a system of public transportation. He faced Jérôme Dandjinou of the governing Cauris Forces for an Emerging Benin. Following the local election, the municipal councillors re-elected Soglo as Mayor on 3 June 2008. There were 48 votes in favor of Soglo and one abstention.

He was succeeded as Mayor by his son, Léhady Soglo, who had previously served as his deputy.

== See also ==
- Timeline of Cotonou, 2000s–present

Political offices
Preceded by Mathieu Kérékou	President of Benin; 1991 – 1996	Succeeded by Mathieu Kérékou
Preceded by Abdou Diouf	Chairman of the Economic Community of West African States; 1993 – 1994	Succeeded by Jerry Rawlings
