= Democratic backsliding in Africa by country =

Democratic backsliding is the process of a country becoming losing democratic qualities over time. In Africa, democratic backsliding—where governments weaken or dismantle key democratic institutions—has evolved significantly. Traditional coups, overt election fraud, and outright power grabs have declined, while leaders increasingly use legal means such as constitutional changes, strategic electoral manipulation, and suppression of opposition to entrench their rule. Unlike in the past, these modern tactics often exploit democratic frameworks, making them harder to challenge, yet they also tend to be less enduring and more reversible than earlier authoritarian regimes.

== Benin ==
Under the rule of Patrice Talon, Benin, which had been one of the most stable democracies in Africa, has faced severe democratic backsliding, especially after the 2019 parliamentary election, which suppressed the opposition by imposing last-minute registration requirements on parties by invalidating the candidacy of all parties except for pro-Talon parties Progressive Union and Republican Bloc. These required candidates to receive sponsorships from sitting officials, giving ruling parties veto over a candidate's ability to run for office. Security forces were granted amnesty despite using live ammunition on protesters responding to the parliamentary. In response to an African Court on Human and Peoples' Rights (ACHPR) order ruling that its constitutional revisions, antidemocratic actions, and the sponsorship system violate the African Charter on Democracy, Elections and Governance, Benin simply withdrew from the ACHPR. In response to the authoritarian practices, the 2021 presidential election had low voting turnout at 26%, despite Talon claiming that the turnout was 50%. Furthermore, Talon denied that protests following the 2021 elections, which also had security forces using ammunition, killed any demonstrators, when in reality, the ammunition in these protests killed 2 people.

Talon's personal lawyer Joseph Djogbenou became the President of the Constitutional Court of Benin and has also been accused of authoritarian practices by using CRIET, a court to prosecute terrorism and economic crimes, to persecute opposition politicians such as Reckya Madougou, leader of Les Démocrates (the main opposition party in Benin), and Joël Aïvo, who boycotted the election. As a violation of freedom of expression, society members marching in front of the CRIET were arbitrarily arrested to signal "the end of impunity". As of April 2021, at least 400 people have been arrested for political charges during the democratic backsliding and many others have been exiled.

In contrast to the 2019 and 2021 elections, the 2023 parliamentary election was largely violence-free with Benin-based Civic Academy for Africa's Future head Expedit Ologou calling the elections "calm, peaceful, friendly, [and] fraternal in most areas of the country", although Éric Houndété, leader of the LD opposition party, making claims of vote buying and ballot stuffing without providing evidence, saying "The Democrats party rejects this result, which does not reflect the will of the people to make our party the first political force in our country." However, assaults against press freedom continued, particularly against coverage of the 2023 Nigerien coup d'état. Examples include a Nigerian environmental journalist investigating at Pendjari National Park being arrested on suspicion of being involved with a terrorist organization and the suspension of media outlet La Gazette du Golfe's services for condemning the Nigerien military coup.

== Ghana ==
There have been concerns of democratic backsliding under the Nana Akufo-Addo administration, largely due to increasing attacks on protests. For example, a protest made by the opposition party National Democratic Congress on 6 July 2021 against rising insecurity was met with massive police brutality. Amid the rising cost of living, hundreds of demonstrators protested against an economic crisis on 21 September 2023, in which 49 people were arrested. The government claims that the economic crisis was caused by the COVID-19 pandemic and Russian invasion of Ukraine, but many people have blamed it on corruption and economic mismanagement on expensive projects.

Freedom of expression has also declined. Ghana fell from 30th to 60th on RSF's Worldwide Press Freedom Index in 2022 due to increasing cases of abuses on journalists. Examples of attacks include investigative journalist Manasseh Azure Awuni receiving multiple death threats and unsuccessful defamation suits, an armed attack on local radio station Benya FM for covering sensitive subjects such as the government's mismanagement of the fishing industry, and New Patriotic Party (NPP) supports attacking a Ghana News Agency reporter, accusing him of being a National Democratic Congress member.

== Madagascar ==
Since its independence, Madagascar has faced political turbulence largely neglected by the international community, with many instances of leaders coming into power through undemocratic means.

Marc Ravalomanana, who ruled Madagascar from 2002 to 2009, was called out by Andry Rajoelina in 2008 for corruption, embezzlement, and authoritarian rule. The tension erupted into the 2009 Malagasy political crisis on January 26 where 135 protesters were killed by violent governmental responses. On March 16, 2009, after a failed referendum, Ravalomanana resigned after the seizure of the presidential palace and the central bank by the military, who gave power to Rajoelina. This isolated Madagascar through the suspension of financial aid and from the African Union and the Southern African Development Community (SADC).

Rajoelina did not submit his candidacy before the deadline for the 2013 general election and was thus succeeded by Hery Rajaonarimampianina in 2014, but he returned to power in 2019. Although it was recognized as democratic and his term seen as stable, it was criticized for electoral manipulation. There were also fears that Rajoelina would easily win the 2023 presidential election due to a weak opposition, his concentration of the media, army, and judiciary, and support from powerful businessmen.

Protests increased in the lead-up to the 2023 election, which ended in being marred by poor preparation and organization, fictitious votes and polling stations, issuing of identity documents to government supporters, and the harassment and spying of the opposition. The opposition also boycotted the election and left only Siteny Randrianasoloniaiko, accused of creating the facade of democratic proceeses for Rajoelina to compete.

== Mali ==
In 2021, General Assimi Goïta launched a coup that saw the overthrow of President Ibrahim Boubacar Keïta. Initially Goïta promised a new democratic election to be held to elect a new president. Initially installed Bah Ndaw as transitional president, he launched a second military coup in the same year not long after Ndaw took office.

The democratic backsliding started to highlight in 2023 when Goïta government called a constitutional referendum which was opposed by opposition parties as well as Islamic imams and scholars due to concern about making democratic transition less likely. In 2024, the promised democratic election was postponed indefinitely due to "technical reason" without any confirmation about date so far. In 2025, Goïta began banning political parties and transitional parliament has passed bill that allows Goïta to stay as president indefinitely with renewable 5 year terms without requiring an election.

== Mauritius ==
Mauritius has experienced moderate democratic backsliding during the 2019 general election as well as thereafter during the COVID-19 pandemic. The V-Dem institute deemed Mauritius to be a major autocratizer in its 2021 Democracy report.

In the recent aftermath following the 2019 general elections in Mauritius, anomalies were reported by the local press. Examples of electoral irregularities include eligible voters absent from the registration rolls, unauthorized technology in polling centers, as well as strewn and misplaced marked ballots.

In the midst of the COVID-19 pandemic, the government under Prime Minister Pravind Jugnauth made numerous amendments to existing laws that could jeopardize accountability and transparency in parliament. The suspension of parliamentary sessions, ejection of members of the opposition party (including its leader) and the perceived bias of the parliamentary speaker increased in regularity during that time. In June 2020, the Vice Prime Minister Ivan Collendavelloo was removed from office over allegations of corruption in the St Louis Gate scandal. The former attorney general Jayarama Valayden, who is often a voice of dissent against the serving government, was arrested in 2021 for organizing a rally which violated COVID-19 rules on public gatherings. In reaction to unarmed protests against the government's handling of the Wakashio oil spill off the island's coast, the government dispatched an armed police force to deter public assembly.

In reaction to the Independent Broadcasting Authority Bill, worries over the erosion of the freedom of expression and journalistic freedom were voiced. The bill would enshrine in law the ability of judges to force journalists to divulge their sources. Simultaneously, prohibitive fines would be imposed on journalists as well as shortening media licensing from three years to one year while doubling its cost. Mauritius' Information and Communications Technologies Act (ICTA) also sparked controversy for its provision to tap into secure messages, facilitate arrest and imprisonment over online posts and messages deemed defamatory.

== Senegal ==
Senegal has experienced democratic backsliding under the rule of President Macky Sall, who delayed the 2024 presidential election. Presidential candidate Ousmane Sonko was disqualified from the election, and on 31 May 2023, Sonko was sentenced to two years in prison for "corrupting youth"; the sentence prevented him from standing as the PASTEF candidate in the 2024 presidential election. Sonko's arrest and sentencing triggered protests in June throughout Senegal, which were responded by police firing tear gas. It was then followed by restrictions on social media and an Internet outage. After a ruling of the Senegalese Constitutional Council the presidential election was held on 24 March 2024.

== Tanzania ==
Tanzania has experienced democratic backsliding since 2016, and Ethiopia since 2018. Other examples of democratic backsliding in Africa in the 2010s and 2020s include the coups in Mali in 2020 and 2021 and persecution of dissidents and civil society activists in Zimbabwe. During the 2025 Tanzanian general election, Samia Suluhu Hassan claimed she won 98% of the vote and banned the main opposition party from running which triggered mass protests.

== Tunisia ==
V-Dem Democracy Indices for electoral democracy (solid) and liberal democracy (dotted) for Tunisia

After democratizing in 2011 Tunisia was a competitive democracy for ten years. Following the election of Kais Saied as president, he began to backslide democratically. As Saied faced civil unrest against him, he executed a self-coup, dismissing his prime minister and dissolving parliament. Following his consolidation of power, he instituted a new constitution, limited the freedom of press, and began cracking down on Black Africans.

== Zambia ==
Zambia experienced a peaceful transition of power from the one-party rule of the United National Independence Party by the Movement for Multi-Party Democracy in 1991 and its elections had remained competitive for several years, but since the 2011 Zambian general election, Zambia had faced democratic backsliding under Michael Sata and Edgar Lungu. Aid and debt relief from Western donors supported the civil society's ability to curb executive powers, but the PF government criticized the dependence on Western aid as "neocolonialist" and cracked down on civil society.

The democratic backsliding has been partly attributed to flaws in the 1991 constitution which only changed the system to a multiparty system from the 1973 one. In 2021, Hakainde Hichilema was elected as President, putting an end to democratic backsliding in Zambia.

== See also ==
- Democracy in Africa
