= 2026 Beninese parliamentary election =

- 11 January 2026
- All 109 seats in the National Assembly; 55 seats needed for a majority
- Turnout: 36.73% (▼1.06pp)
Party	Leader	Vote %	Seats	+/–
UPR	Joseph Djogbenou	41.15	60	+7
Republican Bloc	Abdoulaye Bio Tchané	36.64	49	+21
This lists parties that won seats. See the complete results below.
Results by constituency
Speaker before	Speaker after
Louis Vlavonou; UPR	Joseph Djogbenou; UPR

Parliamentary elections were held in Benin on 11 January 2026 to elect all 109 members of the National Assembly. The preliminary results of the election were announced on 17 January. The result was a victory for parties supportive of President Patrice Talon, Progressive Union Renewal and Republican Bloc, which together won all 109 seats in the National Assembly.

== Background ==
=== Preceding elections ===
The 2021 presidential election saw incumbent president Patrice Talon being re-elected to office for his second and final constitutional term. In 2023, parliamentary elections saw victory for the parties that supported Talon, with Progressive Union Renewal (UPR) winning a plurality of 53 seats and the Republican Bloc (BR) with 28 seats. The only opposition party to cross the electoral threshold were the Democrats (LD), which also won 28 seats. Éric Houndété, leader of the LD opposition party, accused the pro-Talon parties of vote buying and ballot stuffing in the 2023 elections without providing evidence, saying "The Democrats reject this result, which does not reflect the will of the people to make our party the first political force in our country." With UPR and BR encompassing a total of 81 seats, Talon was expected to retain control of the government until his second term concluded in 2026.

=== Talon's second term ===
Between the parliamentary elections of 2023 and 2026, Talon's second term was marked by the resurgence of coup plots relating to the Coup Belt and the creation of the Alliance of Sahel States (AES) in July 2024. A coup d'état in neighboring Niger in July 2023 and the ensuing Nigerien crisis saw Talon expressing support for ousted president Mohamed Bazoum and condemnation of the coup.

Authorities announced the discovery of a coup plot against Talon in September 2024, scheduled for 27 September and led by the businessman and Talon ally Olivier Boko. Former sports minister Oswald Homeky and the commander of the Republican Guard were named as co-conspirators, leading to the arrest of Boko and Homeky. Both were convicted and sentenced in January 2025 to 20 years' imprisonment and a fine of 60 billion CFA francs ($95 million).

In November 2025, a constitutional amendment was approved by Benin's National Assembly, extending presidential and legislative terms from five to seven years and creating a Senate, expected to have between 25 and 30 members including Benin's former heads of state and other members appointed by the president. This upper house would have the power to request a second reading of the laws approved by the National Assembly, with some exceptions. The reforms were validated by the Constitutional Court of Benin in December 2025.

=== 2025 coup attempt ===
Mutinous soldiers led by Pascal Tigri began a coup attempt on 7 December 2025 with the seizure of residences and abductions of top-ranking military officials. Following this, the rebelling National Guard soldiers then attacked the Presidential Palace in Cotonou in the early morning, where the soldiers were later repulsed by presidential guards. The rebelling soldiers retreated through alleyways to the national broadcaster SRTB, where they held workers hostage.

At SRTB, a group of eight rebelling soldiers, accompanied by Tigri, declared that Talon had been "removed from office as president of the republic". They also announced the suspension of the constitution and state institutions, and identified themselves as the Military Committee for Refoundation (French: Comité Militaire pour la Refondation, CMR). The CMR later announced that all borders were closed and that all political parties were suspended.

The soldiers cited multiple reasons for staging the coup, such as Talon's management of the country, favoritism in the military, the neglect of soldiers killed on duty and their relatives, the deteriorating security situation in northern Benin, cuts to healthcare, increased taxes, and restrictions on political activity. After the announcement, the signal to SRTB was shut off but was restored later in the day.

Following two requests for assistance by the Beninese government, the Nigerian Air Force was deployed to Cotonou to dislodge the putschists, where precision airstrikes upon Camp Togbin were reported. Several putschists were killed. Nigeria also expelled the coup plotters from the state television headquarters and immobilized several armored vehicles. Nigerian ground forces entered Benin shortly after. This marked Nigeria's first foreign military intervention since the 2017 Gambian constitutional crisis.

The French government also said that it had provided surveillance, observation and logistical assistance to the FAB to help thwart the coup, with president Emmanuel Macron leading a "coordination effort" and being in contact with president Talon and ECOWAS representatives.

Benin's interior minister, Alassane Seidou stated that the FAB thwarted the attempted coup at 11:09. At least 14 people were arrested, including 12 active-duty soldiers and another who was dismissed. Twelve suspects are believed to have participated in the attack on state television. Tigri and several of his men remained fugitives by the night of 9 December. Tigri later fled to Lomé, Togo and then Burkina Faso, before finding refuge in Niamey, Niger.

Later that evening, president Talon appeared on television and reiterated the failure of the coup, while promising to punish "this treachery". Weapons were also discovered stashed in the Togbin, Fidjrosse, and Akogbato neighborhoods. Following the attack, roads to and from the Presidential Palace were closed, with police officers in front diverting traffic from the scene. Traffic elsewhere in Cotonou was normal.

==== Post-coup arrests and reactions ====
The Beninese government made several arrests and issued several arrest warrants for people they deemed supportive of or involved in the coup attempt. At least 30 suspects appeared at the Special Criminal Court (CRIET) on 15 December in connection with the coup attempt. On 12 December, Talon's political opponent and head of the Restaurer l'Espoir (Restore Hope) party Candide Azannaï was arrested. On 14 December, Chabi Yayi, the son of former president Thomas Boni Yayi, was arrested at his house for reasons alleged to be related to the coup attempt.

Kémi Séba, a candidate in the 2026 Beninese presidential election and pro-AES and pro-Russian blogger, expressed his support for the coup while it was ongoing. Other pro-AES social media accounts posted claims heralding the coup's success as soon as news broke. Séba's support of the coup, along with similar support statements from Sabi Korogone, would result in an arrest warrant for both people being issued by Benin's government.

The Democrats, the primary opposition party in Benin and party of former president Thomas Boni Yayi, condemned the coup and released a statement supporting the Beninese government. Boni Yayi himself released a statement in support of the government on 7 December, expressing solidarity with Talon. The Islamic Union of Benin released a similar statement. The Cowry Forces for an Emerging Benin (FCBE) political party also condemned the coup attempt and released a statement in support of the government. Former president Nicéphore Soglo also released a statement supporting the government.

== Electoral system ==
The 109 members of the National Assembly are elected by proportional representation in 24 multi-member constituencies, based on the country's departments, with seats allocated using the simple quotient and then the largest remainder method. The electoral threshold was revised in 2024, and any party that concluded coalition agreements before the election must win at least 10% of the vote in all 24 electoral constituencies. Otherwise, a party must win at least 20% of the vote in all constituencies to gain seats. A deposit of 249 million francs is required for a list to contest the elections.

Lists are required to put forward at least one candidate in all constituencies. Following the constitutional revision of 2019, the mandate of deputies elected in the 2023 elections was reduced from four to three years, as a transitional measure, while the normal duration of the mandate in following elections was extended from four to five years. Following this, in January 2026, Benin will hold with new legislative and municipal elections combined with a presidential-vice-presidential election (for a five-year term) later in April. The revision also introduces a total of 24 seats reserved for women, one per constituency, as well as a limit of three terms from the 2023 elections, without retroactive effect, for all MPs.

== Election calendar ==
On 8 October 2025, the Autonomous National Electoral Commission (CENA) published the electoral calendar for the parliamentary elections during a press release.

Election timetable
Dates	Activities
15 July 2025	Receipt of statistics from the computerized electoral roll
18 July 2025	Publication of the decision listing required documents and procedures for submitting candidacies
15–29 October 2025	Posting of the electoral roll
8–12 November 2025	Registration of candidacies for the election of National Assembly members
13 November 2025	Publication of the list of political parties that submitted candidacy files for National Assembly elections
1 December 2025	Publication of the final list of political parties for the National Assembly elections
15–19 December 2025	Delivery of sample ballots to participating political parties
26 December 2025 to 9 January 2026	Electoral campaign
11 January 2026	Election day Counting of votes at polling stations Compilation of results
12–13 January 2026	Publication of the provisional results of the election of members of the National Assembly
Late January to early February 2026	Official results

== Campaign ==
Five parties chose to compete in the elections. They were the Progressive Union Renewal (UPR), the Republican Bloc (BR), and the Movement of Elites Committed to the Emancipation of Benin (MOELE-BENIN) from the presidential majority. In the opposition were the Democrats (LD) and Cowry Forces for an Emerging Benin (FCBE).

The main election issue is proposed constitutional reforms, including extending presidential and legislative terms from five to seven years and creating an upper house of the legislature called the Senate. Security was another key concern, as jihadist violence from Burkina Faso and Niger spilled over into the northern regions of Benin. The campaign period was mostly muted, without much enthusiasm compared to past elections.

Instead of large rallies, parties opted for grassroots strategies and door-to-door canvassing. Candidates also utilized social media, particularly on Facebook, Whatsapp, and TikTok. During the campaign, the Democrats did not form a parliamentary agreement. Due to infighting, the electoral threshold for the Democrats to win seats stayed at 20% in all 24 electoral districts, rather than the lowered threshold of 10% for parties that formed an agreement before the election.

== Results ==
Provisional results released by CENA on 17 January revealed that the Progressive Union Renewal (UPR) came in first with 41.15% of the vote, followed by Republican Bloc (BR) with 36.64%. The Democrats (LD) came in third place with 16.14%, but they weren't eligible to gain seats because the party did not gain 20% of the vote in all electoral constituencies. Smaller parties then followed, with Cowry Forces for an Emerging Benin (FCBE) winning 4.86% and the Movement of Committed Elites for the Emancipation of Benin (MOELE-BENIN) winning 1.21% of the vote. Turnout was 36.73%.

UPR and BR, parties which supported the incumbent president Talon, were the only parties eligible to gain seats in the National Assembly. UPR won 60 seats, while BR won 49 seats. The next legislature is set to be sworn in on 8 February 2026.

Party	Votes	%	Seats	+/–
Progressive Union Renewal	1,149,251	41.21	60	+7
Republican Bloc	1,021,459	36.62	49	+21
The Democrats	451,820	16.20	0	−28
Cowry Forces for an Emerging Benin	133,263	4.78	0	0
Movement of Committed Elites for the Emancipation of Benin	33,199	1.19	0	0
Total	2,788,992	100.00	109	0
Valid votes	2,788,992	96.88		
Invalid/blank votes	89,734	3.12		
Total votes	2,878,726	100.00		
Registered voters/turnout	7,834,608	36.74		
Source: Constitutional Court
