= Conceptia Ouinsou =

Beninese lawyer, educator and politician (1942–2011)

President of the Constitutional Court of Benin
- In office 1998–2008
- Preceded by: Elisabeth Ekoué Pognon
- Succeeded by: Robert Dossou

Minister of Higher Education and Scientific Research
- In office 15 May 1998 – 12 July 1998
- President: Mathieu Kérékou

Personal details
- Born: 21 September 1942 Grande-Saline, Artibonite, Haiti
- Died: 2 March 2011 (aged 68) Cotonou, Benin
- Children: 3
- Education: Université d'État d'Haïti; Paris-Panthéon-Assas University
- Awards: National Order of Benin

Conceptia Liliane Dénis Ouinsou (21 September 1942 – 2 March 2011), sometimes known by the surname Denis-Ouinsou or Denis epse Ouinsou, was a Beninese lawyer, university educator and politician. She was president of the Constitutional Court of Benin from 1998 to 2008.

== Biography ==
Ouinsou was born on 21 September 1942 in Grande-Saline, Artibonite, Haiti. She was sometimes known by the surname Denis-Ouinsou or Denis epse Ouinsou.

Ouinsou Ouinsou was educated at the Sœurs de la Sainte Trinité and Collège St. Pierre in Haiti. She studied an undergraduate degree in administration and social sciences at the Université d'État d'Haïti. She then studied a postgraduate degree in law and a doctorate in private law at the Paris-Panthéon-Assas University (commonly known as the University of Paris II) in Paris, France.

Ouinsou became an Associate of Private Law in Libreville, Gabon, in November 1985.

Ouinsou was vice-rector of the Université Nationale du Bénin (National University of Benin, now the University of Abomey-Calavi) from June 1990 to February 1992. During the 1990s she was president of the Law-Economics Sectoral Scientific Committee.

Ouinsou was briefly the minister of national education and scientific research in the government of Mathieu Kérékou, from 15 May to 12 July 1998, before being called to the constitutional court.

Ouinsou was president of Constitutional Court of Benin from 1998 to 2008. She was the second woman to preside over Benin's constitutional court, succeeding Elisabeth Ekoué Pognon. In 2004, Ouinsou ruled that a clause on polygamy of the draft Beninese Family Code was unconstitutional, citing Article 26 of the Constitution of Benin which provides that women and men are equal.

Ouinsou was attacked at her home in 2005, but the attack was repelled by her security detail.

After the 2007 Beninese parliamentary election, Ouinsou announced that authorities had "uncovered several irregularities, including attempts to stuff ballot boxes, underage voting and pressuring of voters," but that the election of Thomas Boni Yayi was valid.

Ouinsou died on 2 March 2011 in Cotonou, Benin, aged 68, following a cardiac arrest.

== Honours ==
- Officer of the Ordre des Palmes académiques
- Officer of the Ordre international des Palmes académiques du CAMES [fr]
- Grand Officer of the National Order of Benin
- Grand Cross of the National Order of Benin
