= National Order of Benin =

Highest national honour of Benin

National Order of Benin Ordre National du Bénin
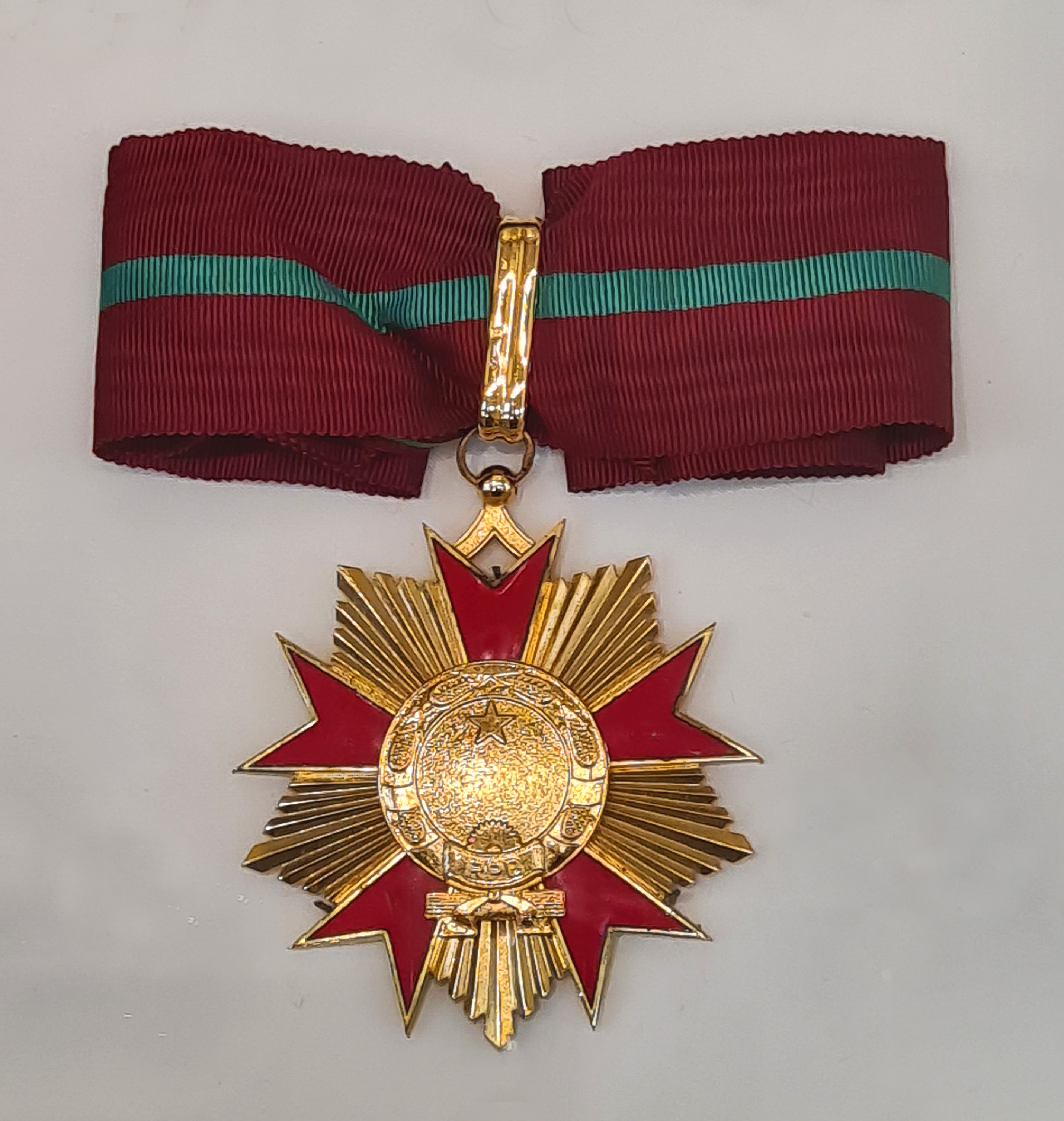
- Grand Cross Grand Officer Commander Officer Knight
- Type: National order of merit
- Country: Benin
- Awarded for: Personal merit and service to the nation
- Grand Master: President of Benin
- Grand Chancellor: Osséni Koubouratou

The National Order of Benin (French: Ordre National du Bénin) is the highest national honour in the Republic of Benin. It is conferred on individuals that have achieved high merits in their field, and is awarded by the President of Benin. It is one of two post-colonial national medals of Benin, the other being the Medal of Honor of the Police. Recipients of this award include Aliko Dangote, President Dr. Ernest Bai Koroma, and Bunmi Makinwa.

== Recipients ==
- Vicentia Boco
- Thomas Boni Yayi
- Carla Bruni (2010)
- Maurice Couve de Murville
- Aliko Dangote
- Levi Eshkol
- Charles de Gaulle
- Ernest Bai Koroma
- Bunmi Makinwa
- Denis Sassou Nguesso (2011)
- Alassane Ouattara (2013)
- Conceptia Ouinsou
- Zalman Shazar
- Jacques Chirac (1996)
- Michel Sidibé
- Al-Waleed bin Talal
- Mahmoud Ahmadinejad
- Luiz Inácio Lula da Silva
- Kim Il Sung
- Kenion Benjamin
- Vivi l'internationale
- Sakinatou Abdou Alfa Orou Sidi
- François Adébayo Abiola
- Dandi Gnamou
