= Pognon =

Pognon is a surname. Notable people with the surname include:

- Elisabeth Ekoué Pognon (born 1937), first female judge in Benin
- Henri Pognon (1853–1921), French epigrapher and Assyriologist
- Ronald Pognon (born 1982), French sprint athlete
