= Supreme Court of Benin =

The Supreme Court of Benin (French: Cour suprême du Bénin) is Benin's Supreme court. It exercises original jurisdiction over serious matters in Benin of which a lower court (or, a magistrate's court) does not have the proper authority to operate and/or act on.

Its president is Dandi Gnamou since 1 March 2024.

== See also ==
- Constitutional Court of Benin
