= Dandi Gnamou =

Beninese judge

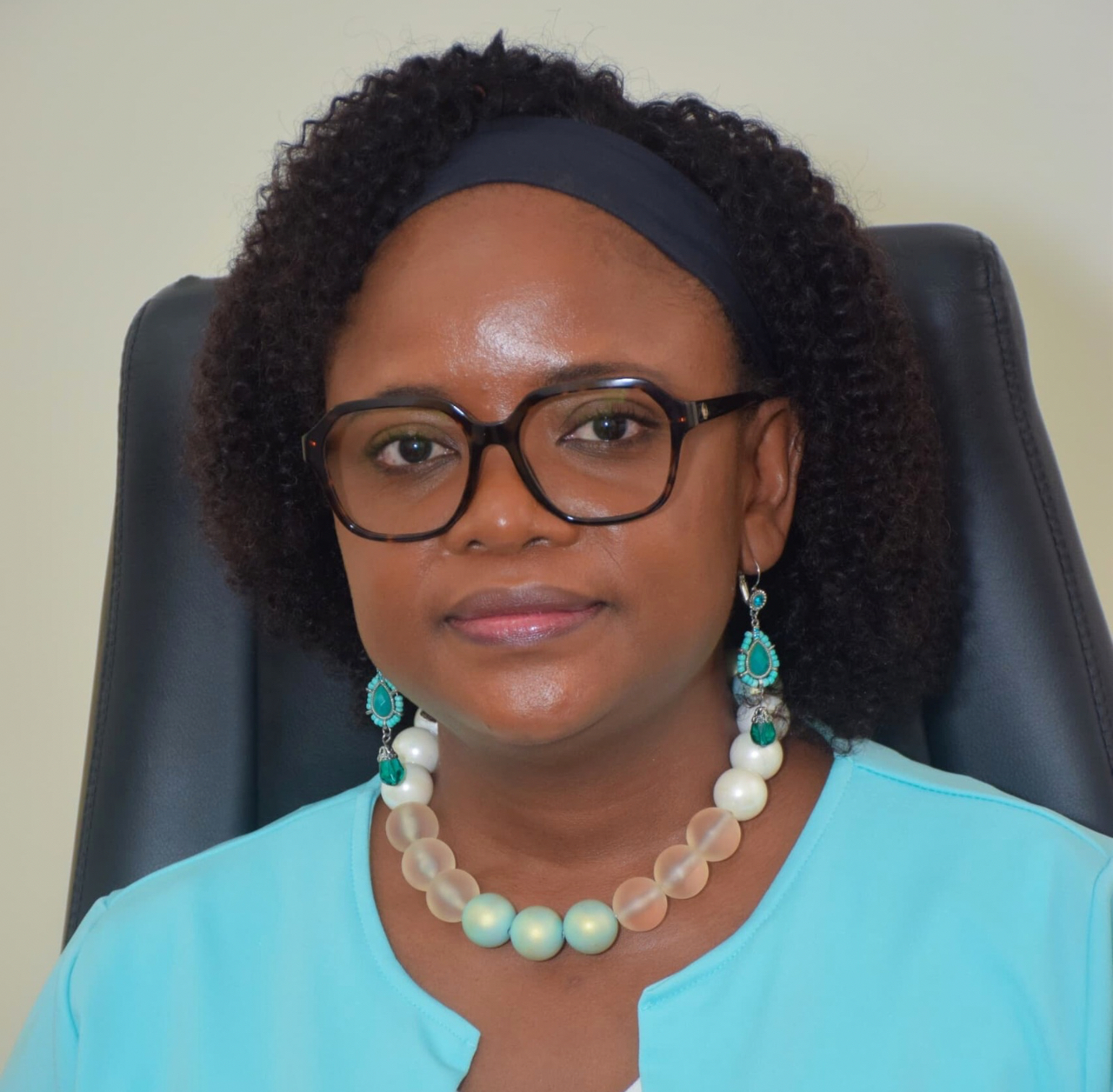
- Gnamou in 2024

President of the Supreme Court
- Incumbent
- Assumed office 1 March 2024
- Preceded by: Marie Cécile de Dravo

Personal details
- Education: Paris-Sud University; École nationale d'administration et de magistrature Paris 1 Panthéon-Sorbonne University

Dandi Gnamou is a Beninese judge, president of the Supreme Court of Benin since 2024 and justice of the Constitutional Court since 2023. She previously served as president of the Court of Auditors of Benin.

== Early life ==
Gnamou graduated from École nationale d'administration et de magistrature and obtained a degree in public law and public enterprise management from the University of Orleans. In 2001, she obtained a master's degree in international and European law from Paris-Sud University, a master's degree in European international law and two level 2 master's degrees, in European international law from Paris-Sud University and in international studies, legal anthropology and politics from the Paris 1 Panthéon-Sorbonne University.

In 2001, she began working as a researcher and lecturer in public law at the University of Paris-Sud XI, where she obtained her PhD in 2006. Since 2013, she has been a visiting lecturer at several universities, including the Sorbonne University, Cheikh Anta Diop University in Senegal, and the University of Kara in Togo.She was also legal adviser to the Senate of France and legal consultant to the French Ministry of Economy and Finance. She was also a member of the commission for political and institutional reforms in Benin.

== Judicial career ==
She began her judicial career in 2017, when she was appointed judge of the administrative chamber of the Supreme Court, and between 2020 and 2022 she was its secretary general. In June 2021, she temporarily headed the first chamber of the Supreme Court. In March 2022, she was appointed member of the Court of Auditors of Benin.

On 6 June 2023, she took office as a member of the Constitutional Court and on 1 March 2024 she was appointed President of the Supreme Court, succeeding Marie Cécile de Dravo.

In September 2025, the Supreme Court activated its function to deal with private complaints to the institution.

== Honors ==
- Grand Officer of the National Order of Benin (2025)
