= 2023 Beninese parliamentary election =

- 8 January 2023
- All 109 seats in the National Assembly; 55 seats needed for a majority
- Turnout: 37.79% (▲10.67pp)
Party	Leader	Vote %	Seats	+/–
UPR	Joseph Djogbenou	37.56	53	+6
Republican Bloc	Abdoulaye Bio Tchané	29.23	28	−8
The Democrats	Eric Houndété	24.16	28	New
This lists parties that won seats. See the complete results below.
Results by constituency
Speaker before	Speaker after
Louis Vlavonou; UPR	Louis Vlavonou; UPR

Parliamentary elections were held in Benin on 8 January 2023 to elect all 109 members of the National Assembly. The preliminary results of the election were announced on 11 January. The result was a victory for parties supportive of President Patrice Talon, Progressive Union Renewal and Republican Bloc, which together won 81 of the 109 seats.

== Background ==
The 2016 presidential election was won by Patrice Talon, with the country then widely seen as an example of democracy on the African continent. However, the 2019 parliamentary elections led to a major crisis. Only two parties, both of which supported Talon, were allowed to compete (the Progressive Union and the Republican Bloc), with opposition lists failing validation after the implementation of a more restrictive electoral code by the government. The opposition, civil society and NGOs such as Amnesty International denounced what they considered to be an authoritarian drift by the government, damaging the country's democratic reputation. The conduct of the parliamentary elections was criticised, including the government cutting off access to the internet and social networks during the vote, and the arrest of opponents and journalists in the months leading up to election day.

As expected, the elections saw a low turnout, with only 27% of voters voting. Progressive Union Renewal won an absolute majority with 47 seats, while the Republican Bloc won the remaining 36. Several post-election demonstrations led to violence between police and demonstrators, as well as significant material damage and at least two deaths. The police and army intervened to disperse barricades erected in several streets of the port city Cotonou, including via live fire, causing one death.

Political dialogue was held for six months after the elections and led to an agreement on the rules of participation in the next legislative elections, which was enshrined in a revision of the constitution. Parties could no longer participate in alliances, and were required to present candidates in each constituency to concentrate votes on parties of real national importance. However, during the municipal elections of May 2020, which involved 546 districts, five parties had their participation validated by the Constitutional Court (CENA), compared to 34 party or party alliance lists in the previous municipal elections in 2015. The agreement also led to the number of parliamentary deputies increasing from 83 to 109, but elected for a shortened term of three years, to hold the next set of legislative and municipal elections together in January 2026, followed by presidential elections in April. The latter will also see a vice-president elected at the same time as the president, both elected for a term of five years.

== Electoral system ==
The 109 members of the National Assembly (increased from the prior election's 83) are elected by proportional representation in 24 multi-member constituencies, based on the country's departments, with seats allocated using the simple quotient and then the largest remainder method, and an electoral threshold of 10%. A deposit of 249 million francs is required for a list to contest the elections. Lists are required to put forward at least one candidate in all constituencies. Following the constitutional revision of 2019, the mandate of deputies elected in the 2023 elections is reduced from four to three years, as a transitional measure, while the normal duration of the mandate in following elections is extended from four to five years. Following this, in January 2026, Benin will hold with new legislative and municipal elections combined with a presidential-vice-presidential election (for a five-year term) later in April. The revision also introduces a total of 24 seats reserved for women, one per constituency, as well as a limit of three terms from the 2023 elections, without retroactive effect, for all MPs.

== Results ==
Provisional results were announced on 11 January, with Progressive Union Renewal (UP-R) winning a plurality of seats (53), followed by the Republican Bloc (BR) and the Democrats (LD) each winning 28 seats. The only opposition party to cross the electoral threshold was the Democrats of former president Thomas Boni Yayi. Other parties, including the Cowry Forces for an Emerging Benin, Movement of Committed Elites for the Emancipation of Benin, People's Liberation Movement and Democratic Union for a New Benin combined for approximately 9% of the votes, but did not earn any seats because they did not earn above 10% of the vote individually. Roughly 3% of votes were invalid, and preliminary turnout was 38.66%. The Constitutional Court certified the results on 12 January.

Party	Votes	%	Seats	+/–
Progressive Union Renewal	930,714	37.56	53	+6
Republican Bloc	724,240	29.23	28	−8
The Democrats	598,560	24.16	28	New
Cowry Forces for an Emerging Benin	109,598	4.42	0	0
Movement of Committed Elites for the Emancipation of Benin	56,728	2.29	0	New
People's Liberation Movement	31,638	1.28	0	New
Democratic Union for a New Benin	26,430	1.07	0	0
Total	2,477,908	100.00	109	+26
Valid votes	2,477,908	96.85		
Invalid/blank votes	80,538	3.15		
Total votes	2,558,446	100.00		
Registered voters/turnout	6,769,817	37.79		
Source: Constitutional Court

== Aftermath ==
As the elections were won by pro-government parties, incumbent president Patrice Talon was expected to retain control of the government until his second term concludes in 2026. Although Talon is not a member of either party, the UPR and BR both support his presidency. Éric Houndété, leader of the LD opposition party, made claims of vote buying and ballot stuffing without providing evidence, saying "The Democrats party rejects this result, which does not reflect the will of the people to make our party the first political force in our country." Election observers, including the Benin-based Civic Academy for Africa's Future (CiAAF), noted that the elections were violence-free compared to prior elections in 2019 and 2021, with CiAAF head Expedit Ologou calling the elections "calm, peaceful, friendly, [and] fraternal in most areas of the country".
