= Makinwa =

Makinwa is a surname. Notable people with the surname include:

- Bunmi Makinwa (born 1955), Nigerian businessman
- Stephen Makinwa (born 1983), Nigerian footballer
- Henry Makinwa (born 1977), Nigerian footballer
- Toke Makinwa (born 1984), Nigerian radio personality, television host, and author
