= Vivi l'internationale =

Beninese singer (1946–2022)

- Born: Victorine Agbato; 1946; French Dahomey, French West Africa, France
- Died: 15 February 2022 (aged 75–76); Porto-Novo, Benin
- Occupation: Singer

Vivi l'internationale, stage name of Victorine Agbato (1946 – 15 February 2022) was a Beninese singer.

== Biography ==
Agbato was known for her songs for peace and love during Benin's transition from communism to democracy. During the Sovereign National Conference in February 1990, she sang the hymn for peace, N’dokolidji. She described it as her contribution to peace in Benin. Active in women's revolutionary organizations, she sang in solidarity with prison detainees in Savalou in 2018. In 2008, she was awarded the National Order of Benin.

Vivi l'internationale died in Porto-Novo on 15 February 2022.

== Discography ==
- Chantent les 20 ans de la loterie nationale du Bénin (1982)
- Oluwa Dakun
