= Republican Bloc =

Political party in Benin

Republican Bloc Bloc Républicain
- Abbreviation: BR
- Leader: Abdoulaye Bio Tchané
- Founded: 8 December 2018
- Ideology: Social liberalism Pro-Talon; Pro-Wadagni
- Political position: Centre
- Colors: Green
- Slogan: Liberté – Travail – Prospérité
- National Assembly: 49 / 109
- Municipal Councilors: 991 / 1,815

Website
- www.blocrepublicain.co

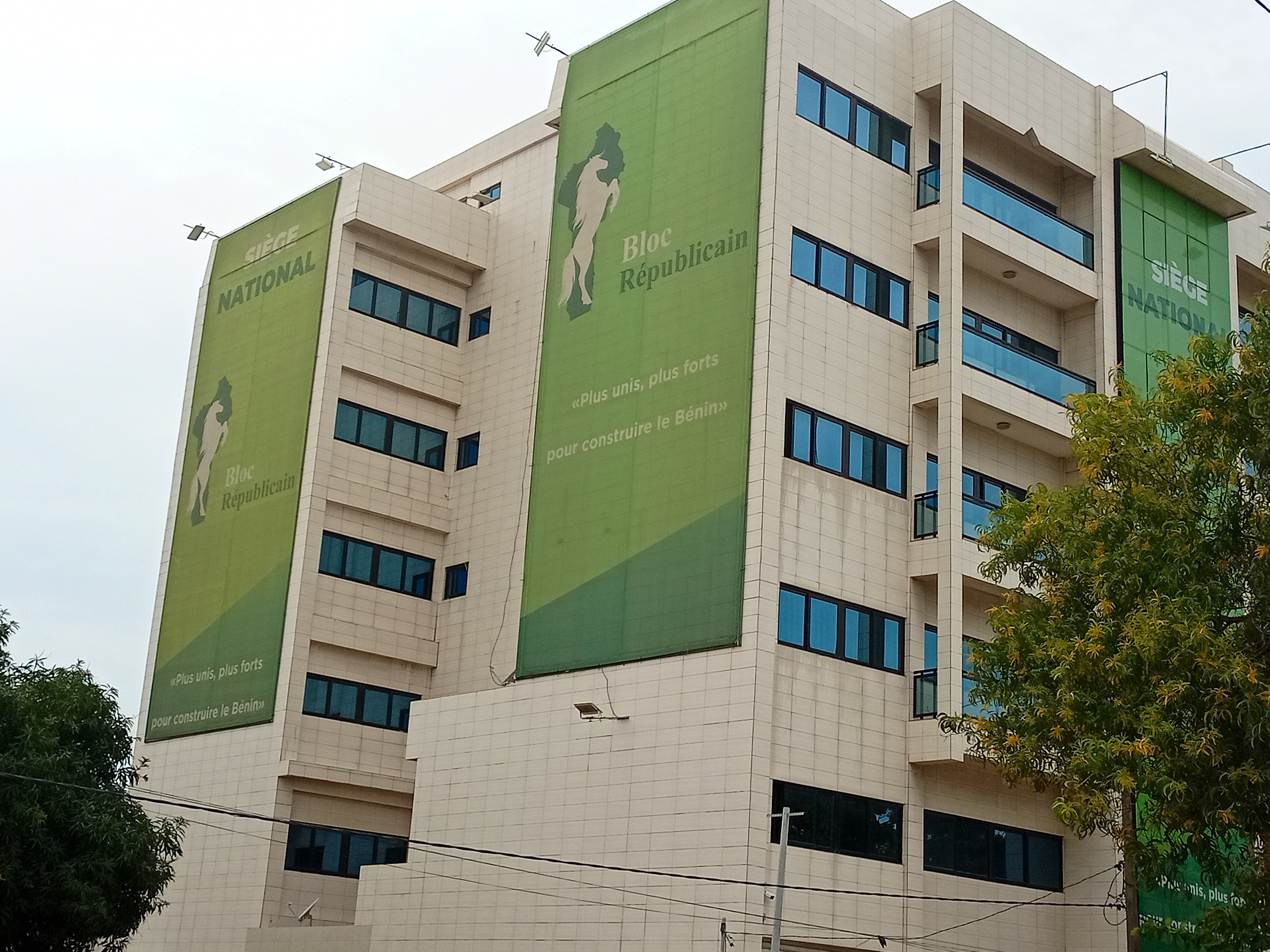
National party headquarters

The Republican Bloc (French: Bloc Républicain, BR) is a political party in Benin, led by Abdoulaye Bio Tchané. In the 2019 Beninese parliamentary election, the party came in second, winning 36 of 83 seats in the National Assembly. Both the Republican Bloc and the majority-winning Progressive Union are allied with President Patrice Talon.

== Election results ==
=== Parliamentary elections ===
Election	Leader	Votes	%	Seats	+/–	Position	Outcome
2019	Jean-Michel Abimbola	502,411	43.78	36 / 83	New	2nd	Government
2023	Abdoulaye Bio Tchané	724,240	29.23	28 / 109	▼8	2nd	Government
2026	Abdoulaye Bio Tchané	1,021,459	36.62	49 / 109	▲21	2nd	Government

=== Municipal elections ===
Election	Votes	%	Councillors	+/–	Result
2020	930,247	37.38	683 / 1,815	New	2nd
