= Nourérou Atchadé =

Beninese politician

Nourérou Atchadé is a Beninese politician who is the president of The Democrats since 23 March 2026.
