= Beninese nationality law =

Dahomean Nationality Code

Parliament of Benin
- Long title: Code de la nationalité dahoméenne
- Enacted by: Government of Benin
- Status: Current legislation

Beninese nationality law is regulated by the Constitution of Benin, as amended; the Beninese (formerly Dahomean) Nationality Code, and its revisions; the Family Code; and various international agreements to which the country is a signatory. These laws determine who is, or is eligible to be, a national of Benin. The legal means to acquire nationality, formal legal membership in a nation, differ from the domestic relationship of rights and obligations between a national and the nation, known as citizenship. Beninese nationality is typically obtained under the principle of jus sanguinis, i.e. by birth in Benin or abroad to parents with Beninese nationality. It can be granted to persons with an affiliation to the country, or to a permanent resident who has lived in the country for a given period of time through naturalisation.

In September of 2024, a law was passed extending the right to Beninese nationality to descendants of Africans who were enslaved and forcibly removed from the continent during the Atlantic slave trade. The Bight of Benin was a major port used by European merchants to deport enslaved people to the Americas. The country views the extension of nationality to "Afro-descendants" as a form of reconciliation in which Benin formerly recognizes its role in the slave trade:

“By legally recognizing these children of Africa, Benin is healing a historical wound. It is an act of justice, but also one of belonging and hope." — Yvon Detchenou, Benin Minister of Justice and Legislation

The Afro-descendant law went into effect in July of 2025.

== Acquisition of nationality ==
Nationality can be acquired in Benin through birth, naturalization, or ancestry.

=== By birth ===
- Children born anywhere who have at least one parent who is a native-born Beninese national; (Note: In the case of a child, who has derived nationality from its mother, the nationality may be renounced at the age of majority.)
- Children born in Benin to foreign parents, if the parents were not in the diplomatic corps, who have resided and at the age of majority are residing in the country, acquire nationality by origin;
- Children born in Benin to stateless parents; or
- Foundlings or orphans discovered in the territory.

=== By naturalization ===
Naturalization can be granted to persons who have resided in the territory for a sufficient period of time to confirm they understand the customs and traditions of the society. General provisions are that applicants be of good character and in good health, have no criminal history of sentencing greater than one year, and are able to speak either the Beninois or French language. If nationality is being considered for exceptional service to the nation, there can be no limiting conditions. The general residency requirement is ten years, but in the case of a foreign spouse, or someone born in Benin, the residency requirement is waived. Besides foreigners meeting the criteria, other persons who may be naturalized include:

- Spouses of Beninese nationals;
- Adoptees of Beninese parents upon reaching the age of majority;
- The wife and minor children of a foreigner who has been naturalized; or
- Persons who have rendered exceptional service to the country.

=== By ancestry ===
- People whose genealogy shows that they have a sub-Saharan African ancestor who was deported from the African continent as part of the slave trade and triangular trade.
- People of sub-Saharan African origin born before 1944 in countries or territories deported as part of the triangular trade.

== Loss of nationality ==
Nationality may be lost in Benin for acting in the service of a foreign government or as a national of another country; crimes against the state or ordinary crimes; fraud in a naturalization petition, or disloyal or treasonous acts.

== Dual nationality ==
In an effort to eliminate statelessness, Benin allows dual nationality if the person obtained authorization for the acquisition of additional nationality.

== History ==
=== African kingdoms (1600–1894) ===
The area which is now Benin was, by the seventeenth century, governed by several kingdoms, including Dahomey and its related kingdoms of Allada and Whydah of the Fon people; Porto Novo of the Ogu people and Kétu of the Yoruba people, which were tributary kingdoms of the Oyo Empire; and Borgu of the Bariba people. Though these kingdoms often warred with their neighbors to consolidate their territories, they also established trade and vassalage systems to secure goods. European contact with the area began around 1580 when the Portuguese landed at Ouidah. Trade relationships were established initially between the inhabitants and Dutch and Portuguese traders, but by 1623 included French settlers and by 1670 English merchants as well. Each of these kingdoms were highly organized states wherein political and economic privilege was granted by the ruler who in turn was owed tributes and allegiance for his protection and favor. Based upon kinship and ancestral linkages, conquest was undertaken to broaden the ties between ancestors and was not focused on conquering foreigners. Marriage was regulated by kinship networks and children born to subjects belonged to the royal lineage of the kingdoms.

In 1698 the Oyo Empire overtook the Allada kingdom, which in turn was conquered by Dahomey in 1724. In 1727, Dahomey subjugated Whydah, as well as the port city of Ouidah. Between 1724 and 1730, conflict between the Oyo kingdoms and Dahomey erupted four times. The battle in 1730 resulted in an agreement for Dahomey to pay tributes to Oyo. With a change in the ruler in 1735, Dahomey attacked territories held by the Oyo, but were driven back and agreed to reinstate the annual tributes to Oyo in 1748. By 1780, the kingdom of Porto Novo had grown to rival the ports of Whydah. The Borgu army defeated Oyo in 1783, precipitating Oyo's rapid decline. Beginning in 1818, Dahomey returned to its role as dominant kingdom on the coast and in 1823, defeated Oyo and ended the debt for tribute. Ongoing conflicts continued into the 19th century when in 1886, Dahomey took Kétu and the following year sacked Yoruba villages to the north and east. However, by that time, European traders increasingly resented the duties collected and fees charged to enter and exit ports. In 1883, the French established a permanent protectorate over Porto Novo bringing France into direct competition with the Dahomey kingdom for control of Porto Novo. After diplomatic talks failed to resolve the issues over administration of Porto Novo and tariffs, armed fighting broke out in 1890 and again in 1892. Behanzin surrendered on 25 January 1894 and was deposed from the throne of Dahomey.

=== French period (1894–1960) ===
Upon taking control of area, the French divided the former kingdom into two protectorates with the Dahomey protectorate centered in Abomey and the Mahi protectorate located to its north. The southern kingdoms, Allada, Grand-Popo, Whydah, were allowed to maintain their independence as long as they did not align with the Fon people who had formerly dominated the Dahomey kingdom. In 1895, the French established the administration system that would govern its possessions in West Africa for the next sixty years. A Governor-General was installed and a headquarters was founded in Dakar, in the Colony of Senegal. The Governor-General's authority was extended to Senegal, Guinea, and the Ivory Coast colonies, and in 1899 to Dahomey and French Sudan. Under Article 109 of the French Constitution of 1848, French territories were to be governed by specific laws until the constitution was extended there. This provision laid the groundwork for nationality legislation based upon whether the native inhabitants were able to be assimilated by adopting European standards. From 1848, those persons who settled in the colonies and were from France were considered nationals who had full rights and were subject to French law. However, those born in the new territories were considered to be nationals without citizenship. Nationals in the older colonies of the Antilles, Guiana, Réunion and parts of India and Senegal were granted political rights, but those in new colonies were confirmed by a decree on 14 July 1865 to be subjects and not citizens, unless they renounced their allegiance to native custom and possessed sufficient understanding of the obligations of citizenship.

Also in 1848, slavery was abolished throughout the French Empire and the Civil Code was extended to all of the French citizens in the colonies. Under the Civil Code, women were legally incapacitated and paternal authority was established over their children. Upon marriage, a woman married to a French man automatically acquired the same nationality as her spouse. Illegitimate children were barred from inheritance and nationality could only be transmitted through a father. Non-citizen nationals were governed by traditional laws concerning marriage and inheritance which placed the well-being of the community above individual rights. These laws prevented a wife from being treated as a slave, required her husband to support her, and entitled her kin to a bride price, to compensate them for the loss of her fertility to their kinship group and secure the legality of the union. Having paid the price for the marriage contract, she and her offspring belonged to the kinship network of her husband and could be inherited if her husband died.

The French Nationality Law of 1889 codified previous statutory laws, changing the French standard from jus sanguinis to jus soli and was extended to the French West Indies. Under its terms, women who would become stateless by the rule to acquire their spouse's nationality were allowed to retain their French nationality upon marriage. The Nationality Law was modified in 1897 when it was extended to the remainder of the French colonies. Clarification in the 1897 decree included that bestowing nationality by birth in French territory only applied to children born in France, restoring descent requirements for the colonies. Under the Code de l'indigénat (Code of Indigenous Status) promulgated for Algeria in 1881 and extended to French West Africa in 1904, nationals in the new colonies followed customary law. The French West African Federation had been founded that year with the existing five colonies, of Dahomey, Guinea, Ivory Coast, Senegal, and Sudan, and was later expanded to include Mauritania, Niger, and Upper Volta.

On 25 May 1912, a Décret N°. 27892 was issued specifically addressing the status of French West Africans. Under its terms, African subjects could acquire French citizenship if at the age of majority and having proved three years of established domicile in the territory, they were able to read and write French; they were of good character and assimilated to French culture, or they engaged in a public or private French enterprise for a minimum or ten years; and they had sufficient means of self-support. The language requirement could be waived for those who had received military medals or recognition of the Legion of Honor or were in the French civil service. Upon application, subjects were required to acknowledge that they gave up their personal status under customary law and were to be governed by French laws. The decree noted that married women and minor children acquired the status of their husband or father however, this was only the case if the marriage had been conducted under French law, rather than customary practice.

Following the end of World War I France passed a law, "Décret N°. 24 on 25 March 1915 that allowed subjects or protected persons who were non-citizen nationals and had established domicile in a French territory to acquire full citizenship, including the naturalization of their wives and minor children, by having received the cross of the Legion of Honor, having obtained a university degree, having rendered service to the nation, having attained the rank of an officer or received a medal from the French army, who had married a Frenchwoman and established a one year residency; or who had resided for more than ten years in a colony other than their country of origin. A 1918 decree written for French West Africa was aimed at decorated veterans of the war and their families, providing they had not previously been denied their rights nor participated in actions against French rule. Even with these laws, only eleven Dahomean men naturalized with full French citizenship between 1920 and 1930.

In 1927, France passed a new Nationality Law, which under Article 8, removed the requirement for married women to automatically derive the nationality of a husband and provided that her nationality could only be changed if she consented to change her nationality. It also allowed children born in France to native-born French women married to foreigners to acquire their nationality from their mothers. When it was implemented it included Guadeloupe, Martinique and Réunion but was extended to the remaining French possessions for French citizens only in 1928. Under Article 26 of the 1928 decree was the stipulation that it did not apply to natives of the French possessions except Algeria, Guadeloupe, Martinique, and Réunion. A decade later, the legal incapacity of married women was finally invalidated for French citizens. In 1939, France determined that marriage and inheritance were too significant to continue being dealt with in native courts. That year, the Mandel Decree was enacted in French West Africa as well as French Equatorial Africa. Under its terms child marriage was discouraged. It established the minimum age at marriage as fourteen for women and sixteen for men, invalidated marriages wherein spouses did not consent, and nullified levirate marriage without approval of the woman.

At the end of World War II, a statute issued on 7 March 1944 granted French citizenship to those who had performed services to the nation, such as serving as civil servants or receiving recognitions. The Constitution of 1946 granted French citizenship to all subjects of France's territories without having to renounce their personal status as natives. In 1945, a new Code of French Nationality was passed, which conferred once again automatic French nationality on foreign wives of French men, but allowed mothers who were French nationals to pass their nationality to children born outside of France. It expressly applied to Algeria, French Guiana, Guadeloupe, Martinique and Réunion and was extended to the Overseas Territories in 1953, but in the case of the latter had distinctions for the rights of those who were naturalized. In 1951 the Jacquinot Decree strengthened the provisions in French West and Equatorial Africa of the Mandel decree removing women who were twenty-one years old, or divorced, from control by a father or guardian and establishing specific rules for the payment and determining the amount of a bride price. That year, Dahomey was allowed to elect two deputies for France's National Assembly.

The legal framework of Dahomey was changed by a statute issued on 23 June 1956, which granted internal self-governance to French territories and expanded their Territorial Assemblies. These changes led to an increase in political activity and a press for the dissolution of the Federation of French West Africa. During the conventions to discuss the 1958 French Constitution opinion in Dahomey was divided as to whether they should refuse to remain in union with France or seek independence. When the public vote was held, Dahomey voted to remain French. With the passage of the 1958 Constitution, nationality provisions were standardized for France, Overseas Departments, and Overseas Territories. Article 86 excluded the possibility for independence of the colonies. In January 1959, a constituent assembly was called to discuss building a new African federation including Dahomey, Mali, Senegal, Soudan and Upper Volta. Within a month, Dahomey withdrew from the federation talks and drafted its own constitution, remaining within the French fold. In 1960, President Charles de Gaulle endorsed the independence of the Mali Federation, which included Senegal and Sudan, without the imposition of economic sanctions. This led to a quest for independence in the Ivory Coast and Madagascar. As the British Protected states of Nigeria and British Togoland were due to gain independence that year as well, Dahomey weighed and debated its own independence. In June 1960, negotiations began with Paris to secure independence.

=== Post-independence (1960–present) ===
Dahomey gained independence from France on 1 August 1960, though until 1972 suffered from the instability caused by six Coups d'état. The first constitution was suspended in 1963 and a commission was established to develop a replacement. The new constitution was approved by referendum in January 1964. Within months, it was also suspended and consultation to draft a new constitution was created. In 1965, Dahomey drafted its own nationality code, which carried provisions for legitimate children to inherit nationality from fathers and only illegitimate children to derive their mother's nationality. It also specified differences in how a spouse could acquire nationality. A plebiscite adopted the new constitution in 1968, but in 1969 and again in 1972 military coups overturned the government and established military rule. In 1975, a new constitution was adopted on a socialist model and changed the name of the country from the Republic of Dahomey to the People's Republic of Benin.

In 1990, the a new Constitution was promulgated, when the nation shifted from a socialist republic to a democracy. The change in governance resulted in a call for the Nationality and Family Codes to be updated. In 1996, the Constitutional Court declared the previous family legislation, Coutumier du Dahomey (Customary Law of Dahomey) dating from 1931, unenforceable. Work began to change the Family Code, to promote equality in the rights and obligations of parents and change marriage and inheritance rules. Failure of the National Assembly to pass the new family regulations, prompted activists from Women in Law & Development in Africa-Bénin to launch a campaign to force a vote on the issue. Though passed in 2002, the new Family Code did not go in to force until 2004. A commission to update the Nationality Code was established in 2005. That year, the International Court of Justice resolved a dispute between Benin and Niger regarding 25 islands of the Niger River bordering both countries. Benin was awarded 16 of the islands but has made no provisions to extend nationality to the inhabitants of these territories. In 2014, provisions in the Nationality Code that were gender discriminatory were declared unconstitutional by the Benin Constitutional Court. Though the Code had not been amended in 2017, and was still being discussed in 2021, Article 124 of the 1990 Constitution of Benin rendered the discriminatory provisions unenforceable. (Note: The 1990 Constitution was amended in 2019; however, changes made had to do with creation of a position for vice-president, election reform, the process for ratifying international conventions, quotas for women to serve in the legislature, and suspending the death penalty. The African Court on Human and Peoples' Rights called for the changes to be annulled.)
