= National Syndicate of Tunisian Journalists =

Tunisian professional association

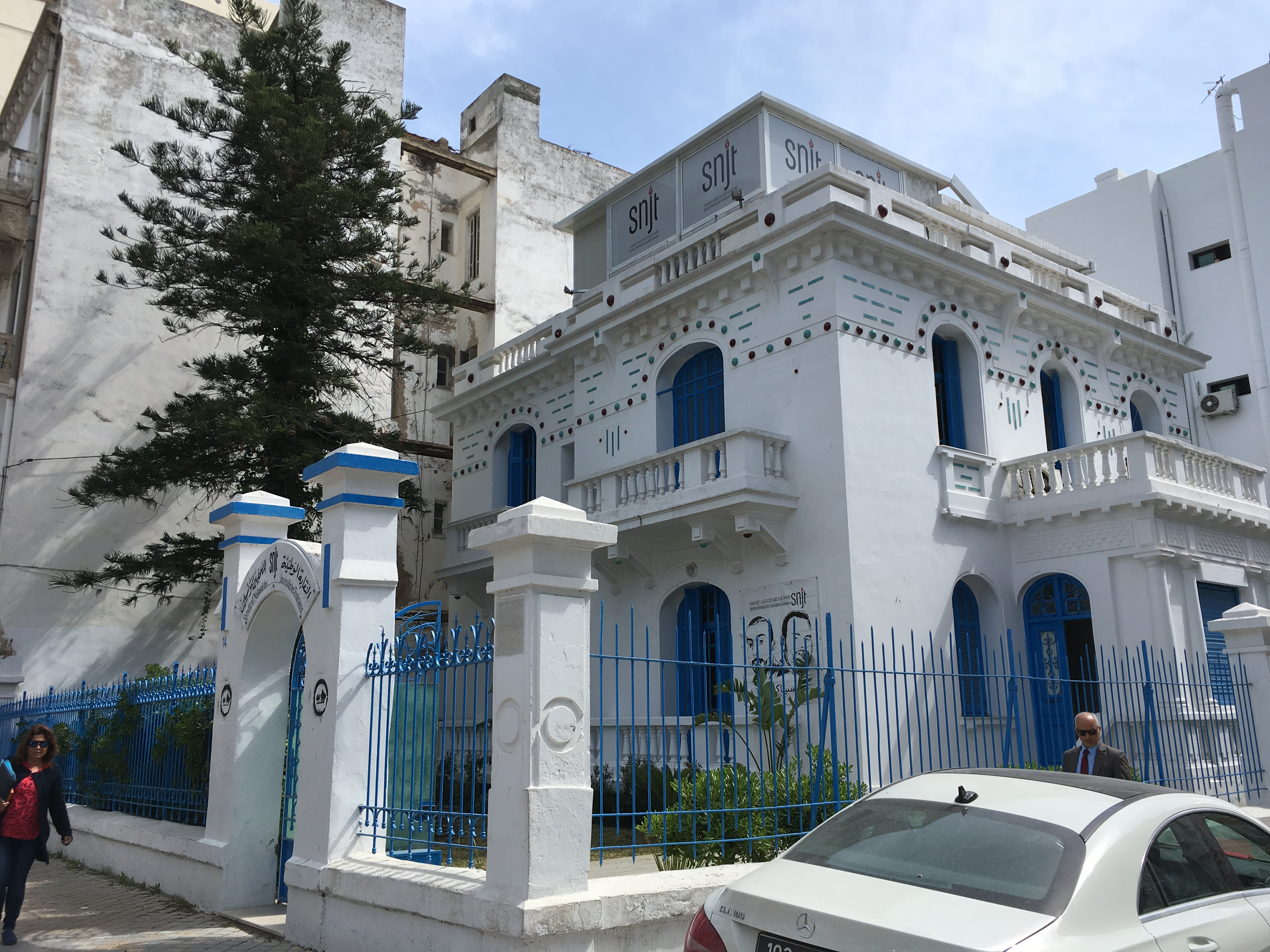
Image of National Syndicate of Tunisian Journalists

The National Syndicate of Tunisian Journalists (Arabic: النقابة_الوطنية_للصحفيين_التونسيين, French: Syndicat National des Journalistes Tunisiens, or SNJT) is an independent, non-governmental professional association that defends the right of free speech and overall rights of journalists in Tunisia.

== See also ==
- Decree Law 54 (Tunisia)
- Tunisian General Labor Union
- Tunis Afrique Presse
