= Ministry of Justice (Benin) =

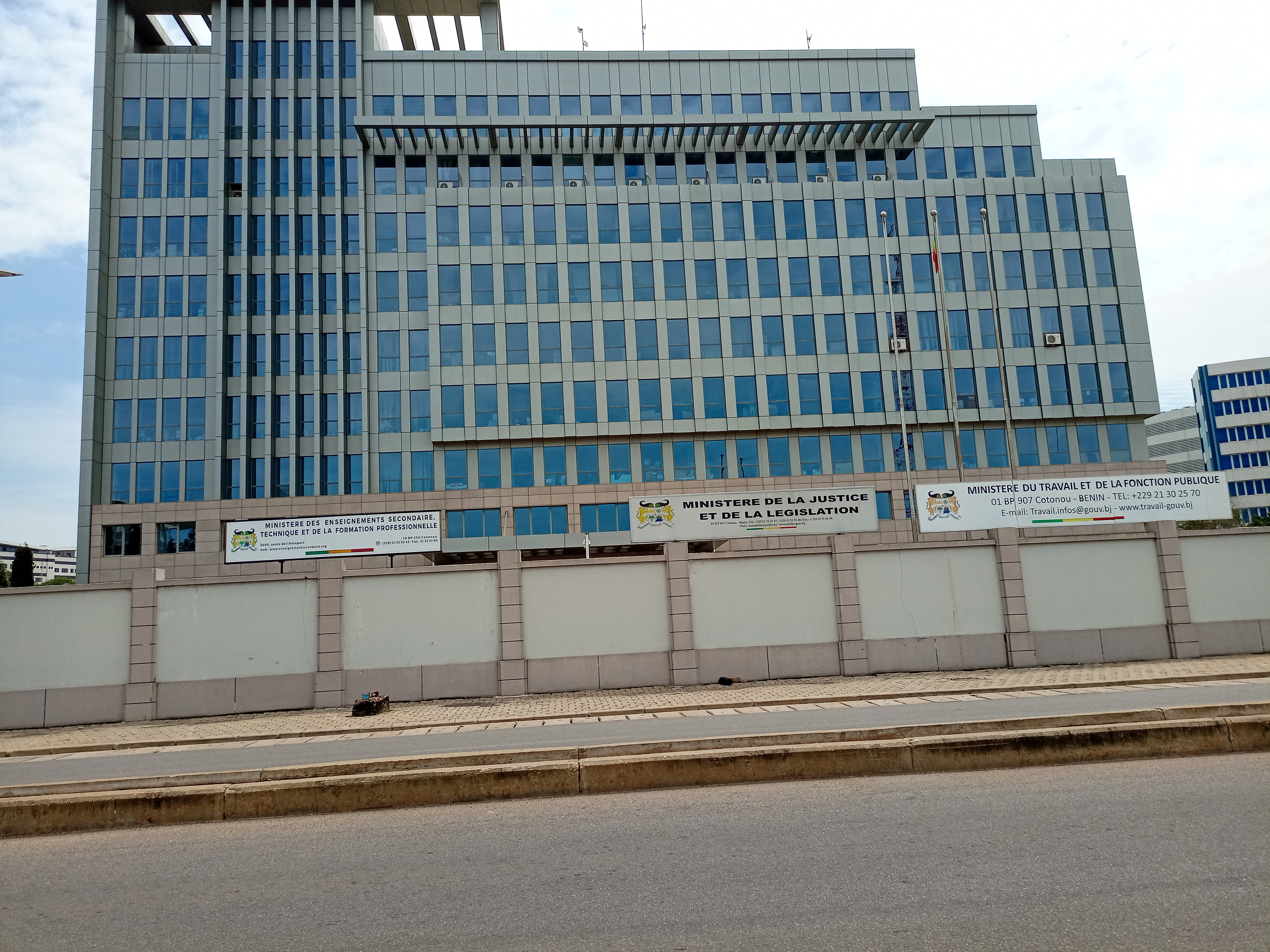
Ministry of Justice Building

The Ministry of Justice of Benin provides public safety and legal services that "promote the rule of law, ensure the safety and security of the public and uphold the interest of the government and people of the Republic of Benin." According to Article 6 of the Law on the Statute of the Judiciary, the Minister of Justice is the direct superior of the Magistrates of the Public Prosecutor's Office and the Central Administration of the Ministry of Justice. With reference to past records, the minister's title has been Minister of Justice and Legislation and Minister of Justice, Legislative Affairs and Human Rights.

== List of ministers ==
- Louis Ignacio-Pinto (1958-1959)
- Emile Poisson (1959)
- Joseph Adjignon Keke (1960-1963)
- Alexandre Adande (1964-1965)
- Arsine Kinde (1966)
- Gregois Gbenou (1967)
- Vincent Guezodje (1967)
- Barthelemy Ohouens (1968)
- Louis Joseph Chasme (1968)
- Issaka Dangou (1969)
- Benoit Sinzogan (1970-1971)
- Michel Toko (1972)
- Barthelemy Ohouens (1973-1975)
- Moriba Djibril (1976-1980)
- Michel Alladaye (1980-1982)
- Francois Dossou (1983-1984)
- Didier Dassi (1985-1987)
- Saliou Aboudou (1988-1989)
- Yves Yehouessi (1990-1994)
- Grace d'Almeida (1995-1996) [1st female]
- Ismael Tidjani Serpos (1997-1998)
- Joseph Gnonlonfoun (1998-2003)
- Dorothé Sossa (2003-2006)
- Anani Kassa Gazard (2007-2008)
- Victor Topanou (2008-2010)
- Marie-Elise Gbèdo (2011-2013)
- Valentin Djènontin (2013-2016)
- Joseph Djogbenou (2016-2018)
- Sévérin Quenum (2018–present)

== See also ==
- Justice ministry
- Politics of Benin
