= Sévérin Quenum =

Beninese politician (born 1962)

Minister of Justice
- Incumbent
- Assumed office 5 June 2018
- President: Patrice Talon
- Preceded by: Joseph Djogbenou

Personal details
- Born: November 1962 (age 63) Glazoué, Dahomey
- Education: Université Félix Houphouët-Boigny; École Nationale d'Administration
- Profession: Lawyer

Sévérin Maxime Quenum (born November 1962), is a Beninese politician and lawyer and academic who is the current Minister of Justice since 5 June 2018.
