= 2020 Beninese municipal elections =

2020 Beninese municipal election
- 17 May 2020
- 1,815 councilors in 546 districts
| Party | Leader | Vote % | Seats |
|---|---|---|---|
| Progressive Union | Bruno Amoussou | 39.97 | 736 |
| Republican Bloc | Jean-Michel Abimbola | 37.38 | 683 |
| FCBE | Janvier Yahouédéou | 14.98 | 396 |
This lists parties that won seats. See the complete results below.

Municipal elections were held in Benin on 17 May 2020 to elect all councillors in every municipality and commune. The elections took place despite the COVID-19 pandemic.

== Background ==
The election came only a year after the highly controversial 2019 parliamentary election which had seen new electoral laws and financial requirements prevent opposition parties running and saw the two parties aligned with President Patrice Talon, Progressive Union and Republican Bloc, secure the National Assembly.

These same constraints also severely suppressed opposition parties for the 2020 local election. The African Court of Human and Peoples' Rights even called for the election to be postponed but the Beninese authorities went ahead.

== Electoral system ==
The 1,815 councillors were elected in 546 districts of the 77 communes of Benin. Councillors were elected by multi-member proportional voting system with a double electoral threshold which means that to be able to obtain councillors, a party must obtain at least 10% of the votes cast at the level of the constituency, as well as at the national level.

== Campaign ==
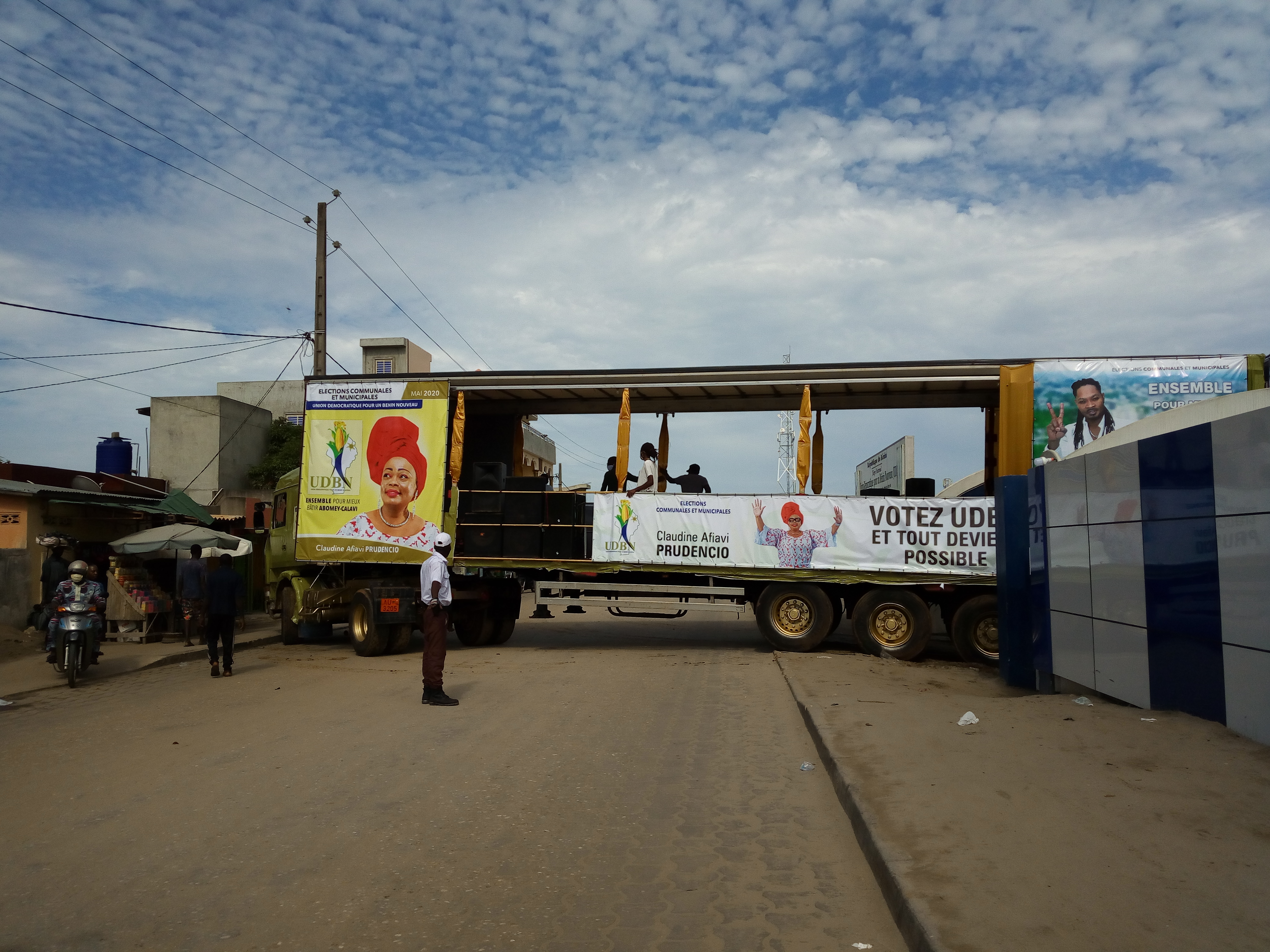
Election poster for the UDBN

Owing to the political situation and the worsening COVID-19 pandemic opposition parties called for a boycott of the polls. COVID-19 meant that campaigning was severely restricted with rallies of more than 50 people banned. This led to posters and media appearances becoming the main campaign strategy of each party.

COVID also meant that face masks had to be worn in order to vote and social distancing measures were brought into place at polling stations.

== Results ==
Turnout was around 50%. Only three parties crossed the electoral threshold of 10% of the vote at the national level. Out of the 77 mayors elected by the municipal councillors elected in this election, 71 belong to the two main parties who are both supporters of the president Patrice Talon. The other 6 went to Cowry Forces for an Emerging Benin.

National results
| Party | Votes | % | Seats |
|---|---|---|---|
| Progressive Union | 994,602 | 39.97 | 736 |
| Republican Bloc | 930,247 | 37.38 | 683 |
| Cowry Forces for an Emerging Benin | 372,818 | 14.98 | 396 |
| Democratic Renewal Party | 136,593 | 5.49 | 0 |
| Democratic Union for a New Benin | 54,066 | 2.17 | 0 |
| Total | 2,488,326 | 100.00 | 1,815 |
| Valid votes | 2,488,326 | 97.57 | |
| Invalid/blank votes | 62,059 | 2.43 | |
| Total votes | 2,550,385 | 100.00 | |
| Registered voters/turnout | 5,190,235 | 49.14 | |
Source: Commission Electorale Nationale Autonome
