= François Adébayo Abiola =

Beninese academic and politician

- Born: November 27, 1950 (age 75); Sakete
- Citizenship: Beninese
- Occupations: academic, politician
- Honours: African Oscar of Excellence 1994; Knight of the Order of Agricultural Merit of the French Republic; Officer of the National Order of the Lion of Senegal; Knight of the National Order of Chad; Knight of the Order of Valour of Cameroon; Officer of the National Order of Benin; Officer of the International Order of Academic Palms of CAMES; Officer of the Order of Central African Recognition; Grand Officer of the National Order of Benin

François Adébayo Abiola (born November 27, 1950 in Sakété), is a Beninese academic and politician. Elected to the National Assembly of Benin in 2007, 2011, and 2015, he served as Minister of Higher Education and Scientific Research from 2008 to 2016 under President Thomas Boni Yayi. He is also the founder and leader of the Beninese political party Mouvement Espoir du Bénin, established in 2009, and became a member of the Autonomous National Electoral Commission in 2021.

== Biography ==
François Adébayo Abiola, the son of Sadatou Assani (born in 1932), was born on November 27, 1950, in Sakété, which at the time was part of the colony of Dahomey in French West Africa—later gaining independence in 1960 as the Republic of Dahomey. He earned his Certificate of Primary and Elementary Studies in June 1963, followed by the Brevet d'Études du Premier Cycle in October 1968. In June 1972, he completed his Baccalaureate (Series D) with the distinction "fairly good."

After earning a university degree in scientific studies—covering chemistry, biology, and geology—in June 1974, he continued his education in Senegal at the Inter-State School of Veterinary Sciences and Medicine in Dakar, where he obtained his veterinary doctorate in May 1979. He later pursued further studies in France, first at the Jussieu Campus of the Sorbonne Faculty of Science and Engineering in Paris, earning a diploma in advanced studies in 1986, focused on fundamental and applied toxicology for the environment and the pharmaceutical and agri-food industries. He then studied in Lyon, where he received a specialized diploma in pharmacy with a focus on phytopharmacy in 1988. That same year, in November, he passed the agrégation exam of the African and Malagasy Council for Higher Education, graduating first among six veterinary candidates.

François Adébayo Abiola earned a doctorate in science with a specialization in fundamental and applied toxicology from the University of Paris VII in November 1991. He later obtained a special management certificate in Dakar in 1994, followed by a graduation diploma from the Center for Diplomatic and Strategic Studies in Dakar in 2000.

=== Career ===
François Adébayo Abiola, an alumnus of the Inter-State School of Veterinary Sciences and Medicine in Dakar, began his academic career there as an assistant. He later advanced through the ranks as a senior lecturer, associate professor, graduating at the top of his class—then lecturer, and ultimately became a full professor in 1992. He later served as president of the institution's council of ministers.

=== Political career ===
He was elected to the National Assembly in the 2007 Beninese legislative elections and subsequently re-elected in 2011 and 2015. In October 2008, President Thomas Boni Yayi appointed him as Minister of Higher Education and Scientific Research, a role he held until 2016. In March 2016, he was named Deputy Prime Minister, serving alongside Prime Minister Lionel Zinsou.

In 2009, François Adébayo Abiola established a political party known as the Benin Hope Movement, which aligned itself with the Cowry Forces for an Emerging Benin. He serves as the party's president. In December 2016, during its second extraordinary congress held in Sakété, the Benin Hope Movement declared that it was officially adopting a centrist position and ending its alliance with the Cowry Forces for an Emerging Benin. On April 3, 2018, the party joined the "Bénin en route" coalition through the signing of its charter by François Adébayo Abiola. At its third extraordinary congress, held on November 3, 2018, in Sakété, the Benin Hope Movement announced its decision to join the political group "Dynamique Républicaine."

In February 2016, he released Le cheveu du pouvoir, a book of interviews about his political journey, co-authored with journalist André Dossa.

On July 27, 2021, following the resignation of Abou Bakary Adam Soulé, the National Assembly elected François Adébayo Abiola as a member of the Autonomous National Electoral Commission for a five-year term as a counsellor. On September 22, 2021, alongside his colleague Laurentine Ahokpé Adossou Davo, he was sworn in before President Patrice Talon and officially assumed his duties.

== Honorary distinctions ==
Elevated to the rank of Officer of the National Order of Benin in 2002, François Adébayo Abiola rose to the rank of Commander, Grand Officer in 2010, and then Grand Cross the same year.

- African Oscar of Excellence 1994 – Dakar – March 1995 (Ministry of African Economic Integration and Foreign Affairs of Senegal).
- Knight of the Order of Agricultural Merit of the French Republic by decree of the French Minister of Agriculture dated January 29, 1996.
- Officer of the National Order of the Lion of Senegal (Decree No. 96-219 of March 11, 1996).
- Knight of the National Order of Chad (Decree No. 352 of October 19, 1999).
- Knight of the Order of Valor of Cameroon (Decree No. 2000-328 of November 17, 2000).
- Officer of the National Order of Benin (Decree No. 2002-0141 of April 3, 2002).
- Officer of the International Order of Academic Palms of CAMES by resolution of April 15, 2003.
- Officer of the Order of Central African Recognition (Decree No. 6.355 of November 30, 2006).
- Grand Officer of the National Order of Benin (Decree No. 2010-159 of May 7, 2010).

== Publications ==
- The Hair of Power, in collaboration with André Dossa, Éditions Afridic, 2016..
