= Oswald Homeky =

Beninese politician

Minister of Sports of Benin
- Incumbent
- Assumed office 25 May 2021
- President: Patrice Talon

Personal details
- Born: Benin
- Party: Independent

Oswald Homeky is a Beninese politician. He is the former Minister of Sports in Benin, having been appointed to the position in early 2021 by the current president of Benin, Patrice Talon. His term began on 25 May 2021.

== Biography ==
Originally from the Couffo department in the southwest of Benin, Oswald Homéky holds a degree in communications. Between 2014 and 2015, he headed the Fraternité press group. He has been active alongside Bio Tchané since 2011 as president of the youth sector, then with Patrice Talon from 2015.

He created the Movement for Alternation 2016 called Front for Alternation in 2016 (FA 2016).

In 2016, under the new government of Patrice Talon, Oswald Homeky was appointed Minister of Sports. Following a reshuffle, he was assigned the departments of tourism and culture in addition to sports. An expert in infrastructure and public procurement before this appointment, he was the director of the firm Aid consultants. On 23 May 2021, he retained his position as Minister of Sports in the second government of Patrice Talon.

In September 2024, Owald Homeky was arrested by the Beninese authorities, at the same time as Olivier Boko, whom he had been calling for support for a year in the run-up to the 2026 presidential elections, the date on which Patrice Talon will reach the end of his second term, a limit set by the constitution. This support is probably linked to the arrest of the two men by the criminal brigade, especially since Boko announced his intention to succeed Talon, relations have deteriorated between the two. On 1 October 2024, Oswald Homeky was charged and placed in custody. The prosecution decided to prosecute Oswald Homeky for “conspiracy against state security”. On 15 January 2025, the Court for the Repression of Economic Offenses and Terrorism (Criet) set its trial for 21 January.

Awards and achievements
Preceded by	Minister of Sports of Benin	Succeeded by
