= Progressive Union Renewal =

Political party in Benin

Progressive Union Renewal Union progressiste le renouveau
- Abbreviation: UPR
- President: Joseph Djogbenou
- Founder: Bruno Amoussou; Abraham Zinzindohoue
- Founded: 1 December 2018
- Headquarters: Cotonou, Benin, Bulgaria Square, 01-1515, Plot No. 620/DE
- Ideology: Social democracy Pro-Talon; Pro-Wadagni
- Political position: Centre-left
- Colors: Yellow
- Slogan: Patriotisme – Travail – Solidarité
- National Assembly: 60 / 109
- Municipal Councilors: 428 / 1,815

Website
- unionprogressiste.bj

The Progressive Union Renewal (French: Union progressiste le renouveau, UPR), formerly called Progressive Union, is a political party in Benin, led by Joseph Djogbenou. It tends to be more popular in the south of the country.

In the 2019 Beninese parliamentary election, the party came first, winning 47 of 83 seats in the National Assembly. Both the Progressive Union and the only other party in the National Assembly, Republican Bloc, are allied with President Patrice Talon. The current Vice President of Benin, Mariam Chabi Talata, is a UPR member. In July 2022, Bruno Amoussou retired and left the presidency of the UP to Joseph Djogbenou. In August 2022, the party merged with the Democratic Renewal Party and changed to its present name.

== Presidents ==
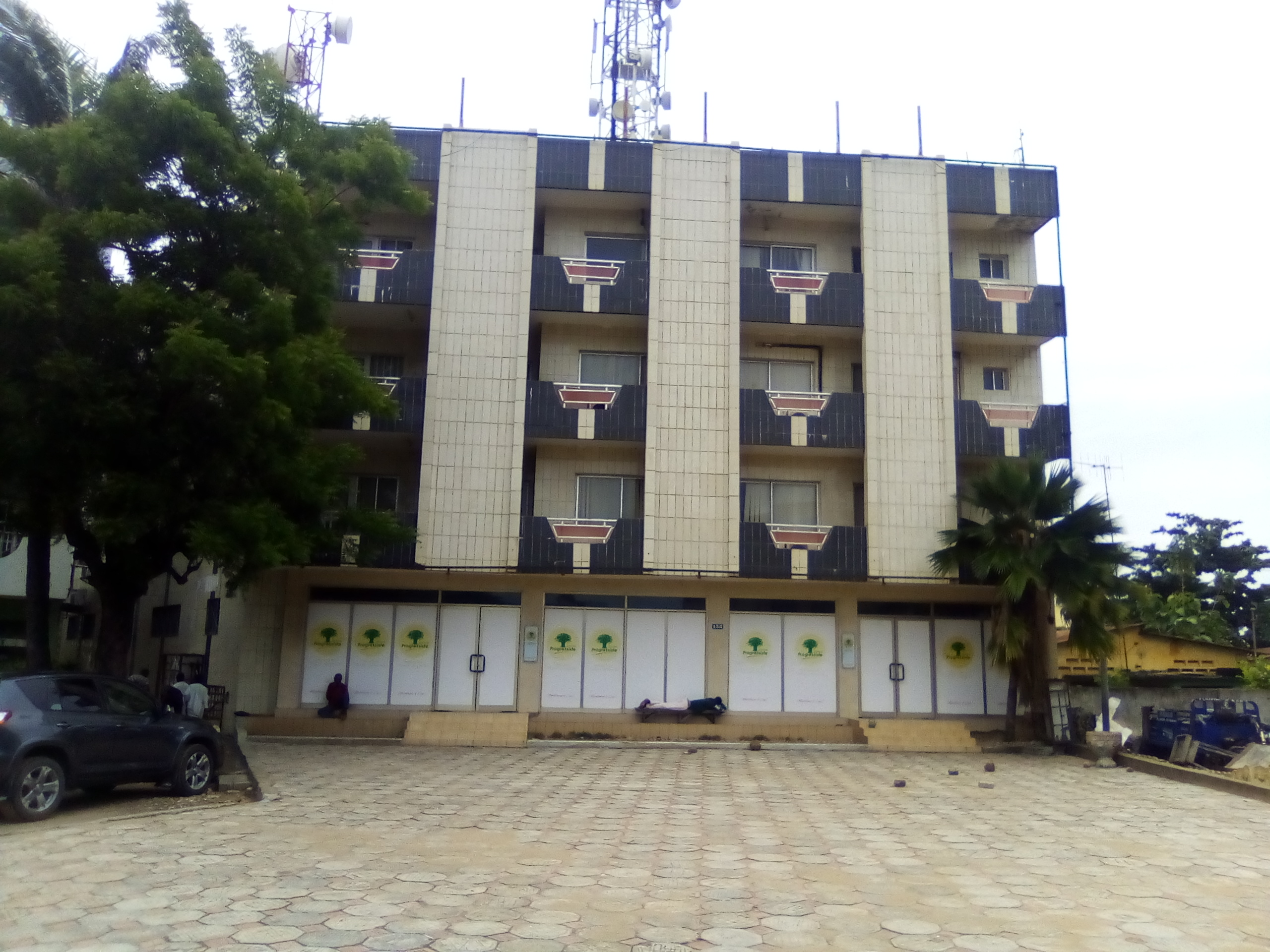
National headquarters

The following is a list of presidents of the UPR:

No.	Portrait	Party leader	Took office	Left office	Time in office
1	Bruno Amoussou	Bruno Amoussou (born 1939)	1 December 2018	16 July 2022	3 years
2	Joseph Djogbenou	Joseph Djogbenou (born 20 March 1969)	16 July 2022		3 years

== Election results ==
Former party logo

=== Parliamentary elections ===
Election	Leader	Votes	%	Seats	+/–	Position	Outcome
2019	Bruno Amoussou	645,214	56.22	47 / 83	New	1st	Government
2023	Joseph Djogbenou	930,714	37.56	53 / 109	▲6	1st	Government
2026	Joseph Djogbenou	1,149,251	41.21	60 / 109	▲7	1st	Government

=== Municipal elections ===
Election	Votes	%	Councillors	+/-	Result
2020	994,602	39.97	736 / 1,815	▲736	New
