= Sakinatou Abdou Alfa Orou Sidi =

Beninese economist and politician

- Citizenship: Beninese
- Occupations: Economist, Politician

Sakinatou Abdou Alfa Orou Sidi is a Beninese economist and politician.

== Career ==
Sakinatou Abdou Alfa Orou Sidi serves as the Assistant to the President of the Chamber of Commerce and Industry of Benin, where she is in charge of studying and analyzing economic issues..She later served as Internal Controller and subsequently as General Manager of the Benin Management and Intermediation Company (SGI Benin). She assumed the role of Director General of the National Social Security Fund in July 2004.

In April 2006, she was named Minister Delegate for Microfinance, Small and Medium Enterprises, and Youth and Women's Employment, working under the Minister of Development, Economy, and Finance. Following the change of government in June 2007, she was appointed Minister of Microfinance, Small and Medium Enterprises, and Youth and Women's Employment. She remained in her position during the cabinet reshuffle in November 2007, and departed from the government in October 2008.

== Distinctions ==
- Commander of the Order of Merit of Benin in 2011
- Commander of the National Order of Benin in 2010.

== See also ==
- Condition of Women in Benin
