= Decree Law 54 (Tunisia) =

Tunisian law on press freedom

In September 2022, the Tunisian president Kais Saied signed Decree Law 54, which purported to combat "false information and rumours" on the Internet. Article 24 of the decree gives up to five years imprisonment and a fine of up to 50,000 dinar for anyone found to be spreading such information. This is doubled if the offending statement is made about a state official.

== Background ==
Since the Tunisian Revolution in 2011, Tunisia has had the greatest freedom of the press of any Arab country. However, following terrorist attacks in 2015, there was an increased clampdown on freedom of the press in Tunisia.

== Criticism ==
However, the new law, which was drafted and approved following the self-coup in 2021, has been criticised. The president of the National Syndicate of Tunisian Journalists, Mahdi Al-Jelassi, described the law as "a new setback for rights and freedoms. The penalties for publishing in any networks are a strong blow to the revolutionary values that granted freedom to all journalists and all Tunisians", and likened the legislation to dictatorial laws the former president Zine El Abidine Ben Ali used to silence dissidents.

The International Commission of Jurists (ICJ) in Geneva, Switzerland, says the law allows the president to censor any and all Internet communications that he does not approve, noting that Article 24 does not specify what is a falsehood or rumour. In January 2023, five United Nations Special Rapporteurs expressed their "deep concerns" about the decree and its compatibility with international law, and Amnesty International has described the law as "draconian".

As of July 2023, at least 14 people have been investigated under the law, (Note: The ICJ says that this number is likely an underestimate.) with some being arrested and put in jail, according to Tunisia. This includes Mehdi Zagrouba, a lawyer wrote a Facebook post accusing the justice minister of fabricating evidence in a case against 57 judges who were accused of corruption and alleged delays in the prosecution of claimed terrorism cases. Zagrouba is now serving an 11-month sentence and has been barred from practising law for five years.
