= Eric Houndété =

Beninese politician

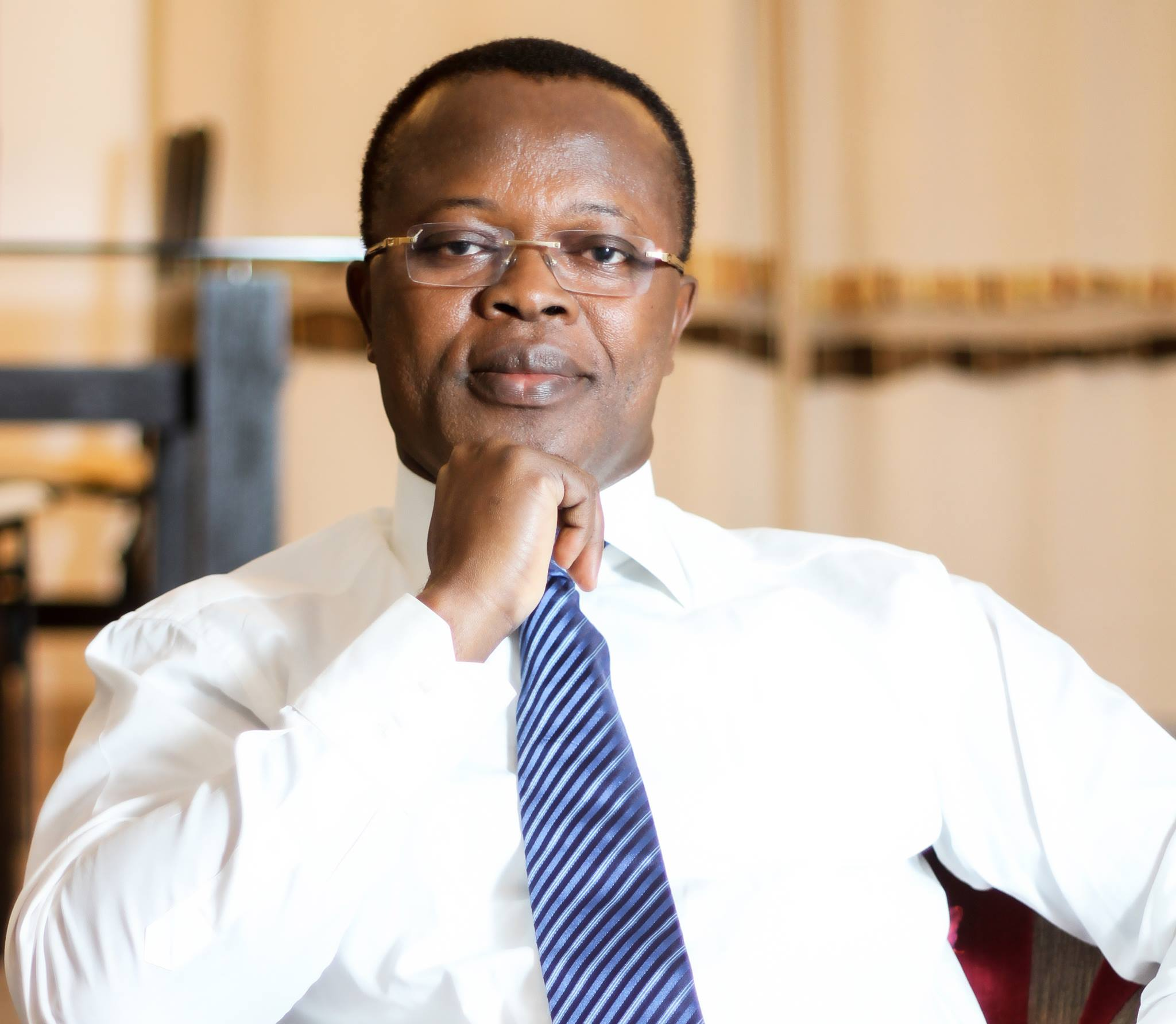
Houndété in 2015

Eric Houndété (born 7 September 1963) is a Beninese politician who is a former member of the National Assembly and First Vice president of The Democrats.
