= Bunmi Makinwa =

- Born: 1955 (age 70–71); Ilesa, Nigeria
- Education: University of Ife (Obafemi Awolowo University), University of Ibadan, University of Cape Town, Saarland University, University of Dijon, Harvard University, United Nations System Staff College and University of South Africa
- Occupations: Business executive and freelance writer
- Known for: CEO of Auniquei

Bunmi Makinwa (Yoruba: Bùnmi Mákínwá; born 1955) is a Nigerian freelance writer and business executive who is the chief executive officer of Auniquei, a private entrepreneurial initiative in communication for leadership. He is a leader in management, communication, and development.

Previously, he was the Africa Regional Director of the United Nations Population Fund (UNFPA); He was also the Director of UNAIDS New York Office; Director and Representative of UNAIDS to the Africa Union Commission in Addis Ababa. He has worked for Family Health International (FHI), Programme for Appropriate Technology for Health (PATH) and World Health Organization. Makinwa was Nigeria's candidate for the post of executive director of UNFPA in 2010. He is currently the chair of the Board of African Population and Health Research Center (APHRC).

From 1987 to 2013, he was based in Senegal, the Republic of Congo, United States, Kenya, Switzerland, South Africa, Ethiopia and he worked in many countries across the world.

== Early life and education ==
Makinwa was born in Ilesa, Nigeria. He has two degrees from the University of Ibadan, Nigeria, where he graduated with a Bachelor of Arts in Modern languages, with a concentration in French and German, in 1980, and a Master of Arts in Philosophy, with a concentration in Political philosophy, in 1985. At the University of Ife he was a student leader and life member of the Students' Union.

He later studied at the John F. Kennedy School of Government at Harvard University, where he obtained a Master of Public Administration in 1993 with a concentration in management and policy.

== Career ==
His career trajectory includes teaching, journalism, executive management and leadership, international development, freelance writer and author. He is a commentator on politics, political leadership, elections, social media, music and the life of impactful individuals.

He also runs a blog titled "Politics, Policies, Poetry and Life in Africa."

He is a commentator on politics and public affairs. He writes analytical columns and opinions for news media and online publications including The Guardian, Daily Trust, and Business Day (Nigeria) newspapers in Nigeria, Sahara Reporters, AllAfrica, TheCable, Premium Times, Realnews, and Africa Development Talk.

He serves on the Boards of several businesses and not-for-profit organizations including the ONE Campaign Africa Policy Advisory Board and Social Workers Beyond Borders. He is a former chairman and member of the advisory board of the Division of Social and Behaviour Change Communications at Wits University, Johannesburg, South Africa.

In June 2012, Makinwa led UNFPA Africa Region to conclude an implementing partnership agreement with Africa Centre for HIV/AIDS Management at Stellenbosch University in South Africa. In the same year, he signed a second agreement between UNFPA and University of Ibadan, Nigeria.

== Works ==
He authored and co-authored publications that include:

- Bunmi Makinwa, Population and Culture, 21 B.C. Envtl. Aff. L. Rev. 291 (1994)
- Communications Framework for HIV/AIDS: A New Direction
- Social Marketing: An effective tool in the global response to HIV/AIDS
- HIV/AIDS Prevention in the context of new therapies
- Male Latex Condom
- Communications programming for HIV/AIDS: An annotated bibliography
- Print and AudioVisual production of Fleet of Hope
- Social marketing – Expanding access to essential products and services
- Health Communications for HIV/AIDS in the following millennium, published in the Journal of Health Communication
- Special production of a supplement issue of the Journal of Health Communication – International Perspectives
- Technical Update on Condoms
- Radio and HIV/AIDS: Making a Difference
- Directory of Social Marketing Projects
- Communication Handbook on Vaccine Trials for HIV/AIDS

== Professional associations ==
- Fellow, Harvard Institute for International Development
- Member, International Communication Association
- Member, Association of Communication Scholars and Professionals of Nigeria
- Member, International Science Writers' Association
- Member, African Council for Communication Education
- Associate Fellow, Coolidge Center for Environmental Leadership
- Member, International Society for AIDS Education

== Awards and honours ==
- Certificate of Merit, All Nigeria United Nations Students Association. 1976
- Life Membership, University of Ife (now Obafemi Awolowo University) Students Union, Nigeria. 1977
- Fellow, Edward S. Mason Program in Public Policy and Management, Harvard University, USA. 1993
- Grand Commander of the National Order of Benin Republic – conferred by the government of the Republic of Benin.
