= The Democrats (Benin) =

Political party in Benin

The Democrats Les Démocrates
- Abbreviation: LD
- President: Nourérou Atchadé
- First Vice President: Eric Houndété
- Founder: Thomas Boni Yayi
- Founded: July 2019
- Registered: 11 December 2020
- Split from: Cowry Forces for an Emerging Benin
- Headquarters: Cotonou, Benin
- Ideology: Social democracy
- Political position: Centre-left
- International affiliation: Progressive Alliance
- National Assembly: 0 / 109
- Senate: 1 / 25

The Democrats (French: Les Démocrates, LD) is a political party in Benin founded by former president Thomas Boni Yayi. Ideologically, the party has been described as centre-left to left-wing. It is since 23 March 2026 led by Nourérou Atchadé.

== History ==
The Democrats were founded by former president Thomas Boni Yayi in July 2019, and were registered to the Autonomous National Electoral Commission (ANEC) on 11 December 2020, although the party had no elected officials yet at the time. Ahead of the 2023 Beninese parliamentary election, the party announced its intent to contest the election and called for "an inclusive, free, transparent and peaceful ballot." (Note: Original: "réclament un scrutin inclusif, libre, transparent et apaisé.") The party also sought to involve the opposition at all levels of the electoral process.

In the parliamentary election, the Democrats obtained 24.16% of the vote and 28 deputies, marking the return of the opposition to the National Assembly after four years of absence. Eric Houndété, the then interim president of the Democrats, dismissed the results, declaring that "the Democratic Party rejects these results, which do not reflect the will of the people to make us the first political force in the country" and making claims of vote buying and ballot stuffing by the two main pro-government parties.

The party lost all of its seats in the 2026 parliamentary election. It was unable to meet the electoral requirement of 20 percent of total votes in each of the 24 electoral districts. The party's national secretary, Guy Mitokpè, criticized the electoral system, calling it an "exclusionary electoral code" and that it "does not honor the country." It also failed to nominate a presidential candidate because a candidate must be sponsored by at least 28 MPs. However the Beninese electoral commission (CENA) said one of them, Michel Sodjinou, had submitted an "invalid" sponsorship, leaving party candidate Renaud Agbodjo with just 27 backers. Six of its then 28 MPs later defected to the ruling coalition before the elections, leaving the party with 22 sponsors, below the legal requirement to submit a candidate for the 2026 presidential election.

The party again gained parliamentary representation in the senate as Yayi chose to take up his seat despite years of opposition to the creation of such institution when the senate was inaugurated on 29 July 2026.

== Ideology ==
The party is described as ideologically left-wing due to its positions on free education, the role of civil society, and free caesarean sections. During the 2021 Beninese presidential election, the Democrats' electoral program sought to invest massively in the Beninese economy in order to fight against poverty and unemployment among young people.

== Election results ==
=== Presidential elections ===
Year	Candidate	Running mate	Votes	%	Position	Outcome
2021	Corentin Kohoue	Irénée Agossa	53,685	2.34	3rd	Lost ✗

=== Parliamentary elections ===
Year	Leader	Votes	%	Position	Seats	+/-	Outcome
2023	Thomas Boni Yayi	598,560	24.16	3rd	28 / 109	New	Opposition
2026	Thomas Boni Yayi	451,820	16.20	3rd	0 / 109	▼28	Extra-parliamentary opposition
