= Constitution of Benin =

Supreme Law of Benin

The Constitution of Benin was adopted by referendum on 23 December 1956. The constitution is made up of a preamble, twelve titles, and 160 articles.

== Preamble ==
(Preamble text comes from the English translation of the Beninese Constitution via the Constitution Project

Dahomey, proclaimed a Republic on December 4, 1958, acceded to international sovereignty August 1, 1960. Having become the People's Republic of Bénin on November 30, 1975, and then the Republic of Bénin on March 1, 1990, it has known a turbulent constitutional and political evolution since its accession to independence. Only the option in favor of the Republic has remained permanent.

The successive changes of political regimes and of governments have not blunted the determination of the Béninese people to search for, in their own spirit, the cultural, philosophical, and spiritual values of civilization which sustain the forms of their patriotism. Thus, the National Conference of Active Forces of the Nation, held in Cotonou from February 19 to 28, 1990, in giving back confidence to the people, has permitted the national reconciliation and the advent of an era of democratic revival.

On the day after this Conference,

WE, THE BÉNINESE PEOPLE

Reaffirm our fundamental opposition to any political regime founded on arbitrariness, dictatorship, injustice, corruption, misappropriation of public funds, regionalism, nepotism, confiscation of power, and personal power;

Express our firm will to defend and safeguard our dignity in the eyes of the world and to find again the place and role as pioneer of democracy and of the defense of human rights which were formerly ours;

Solemnly affirm our determination by this present Constitution to create a State of law and pluralistic democracy in which the fundamental human rights, public liberties, the dignity of the human being, and justice shall be guaranteed, protected, and promoted as the condition necessary for the genuine harmonious development of each Béninese in his temporal and cultural dimension as well as in his spiritual;

Reaffirm our attachment to the principles of democracy and human rights as they have been defined by the Charter of the United Nations of 1945 and the Universal Declaration of Human Rights of 1948, by the African Charter on Human and Peoples' Rights adopted in 1981 by the Organization of African Unity and ratified by Bénin on January 20, 1986 and whose provisions make up an integral part of this present Constitution and of Béninese law and have a value superior to the internal law;

Affirm our will to cooperate in peace and friendship with all peoples who share our ideals of liberty, of justice, of human solidarity based on the principles of equality, of reciprocal interest, and of mutual respect for national sovereignty and for territorial integrity;

Proclaim our attachment to the cause of African unity and pledge ourselves to leave no stone unturned in order to realize local and regional integration;

Solemnly adopt the present Constitution, which shall be the Supreme Law of the State, and to which we swear loyalty, fidelity, and respect.

== Titles ==
Title I deals with the state and sovereignty. It contains six articles.

Title II concerns the rights and duties of individuals. It contains 34 articles.

Title III deals with executive power. It contains 38 articles.

Title IV deals with legislative power. It is subdivided into sections on the National Assembly and relations between the assembly and government. It contains 35 articles.

Title V deals with the Constitutional Court of Benin. It contains 11 articles.

Title VI deals with judicial power. It is subdivided into sections on the Supreme Court and the High Court of Justice. It contains 14 articles.

Title VII deals with the Economic and Social Council of Benin. It contains three articles.

Title VIII deals with the High Commission of Audio-Visuals and Communications. It contains two articles.

Title IX deals with treaties and international agreements. It contains six articles.

Title X deals with the territorial divisions of Benin. It contains four articles.

Title XI deals with revisions to the constitution. It contains three articles.

Title XII deals with final transitional provisions. It contains four articles.
