= Elisabeth Ekoué Pognon =

Beninese judge

Judge
- Incumbent
- Assumed office 1965

Personal details
- Born: Elisabeth Kayissan Ekou; 1937 (age 88–89)
- Education: University of Poitiers; University of Paris; Panthéon-Assas University

Elisabeth Kayissan Ekoué Pognon (born 1937) is Benin's first female judge, first woman member of its supreme court, and the first woman to be elected president of its stand-alone constitutional court.

== Early life ==
She was born Elisabeth Kayissan Ekoué (Pognon is her married name) in 1937.

She was educated at secondary schools in Lomé, Togo, and Dakar, Senegal.

She earned a bachelor's degree in law from the University of Poitiers in France, followed by a master's degree in law from the Panthéon-Assas University in Paris, in 1962.

== Career ==
In 1965, Pognon joined the magistrature in Benin, becoming the country's first woman judge.

After serving in the ordinary courts, she became president of the court of first instance in Cotonou, and later in the court of appeals and other high courts before becoming a judge in the administrative chamber of Benin's supreme court, and the first woman member of that court.

In 1993, she became the first woman to be appointed as a judge to the new stand-alone constitutional court in Benin, and later that year was elected president of it by her fellow members, a position which she held until 1998, when she was succeeded by Conceptia Denis Ouinsou.

She has retired from judicial service.

== See also ==
- First women lawyers around the world
