= Jean-Michel Abimbola =

Beninese politician

Babalola Jean-Michel Hervé Abimbola
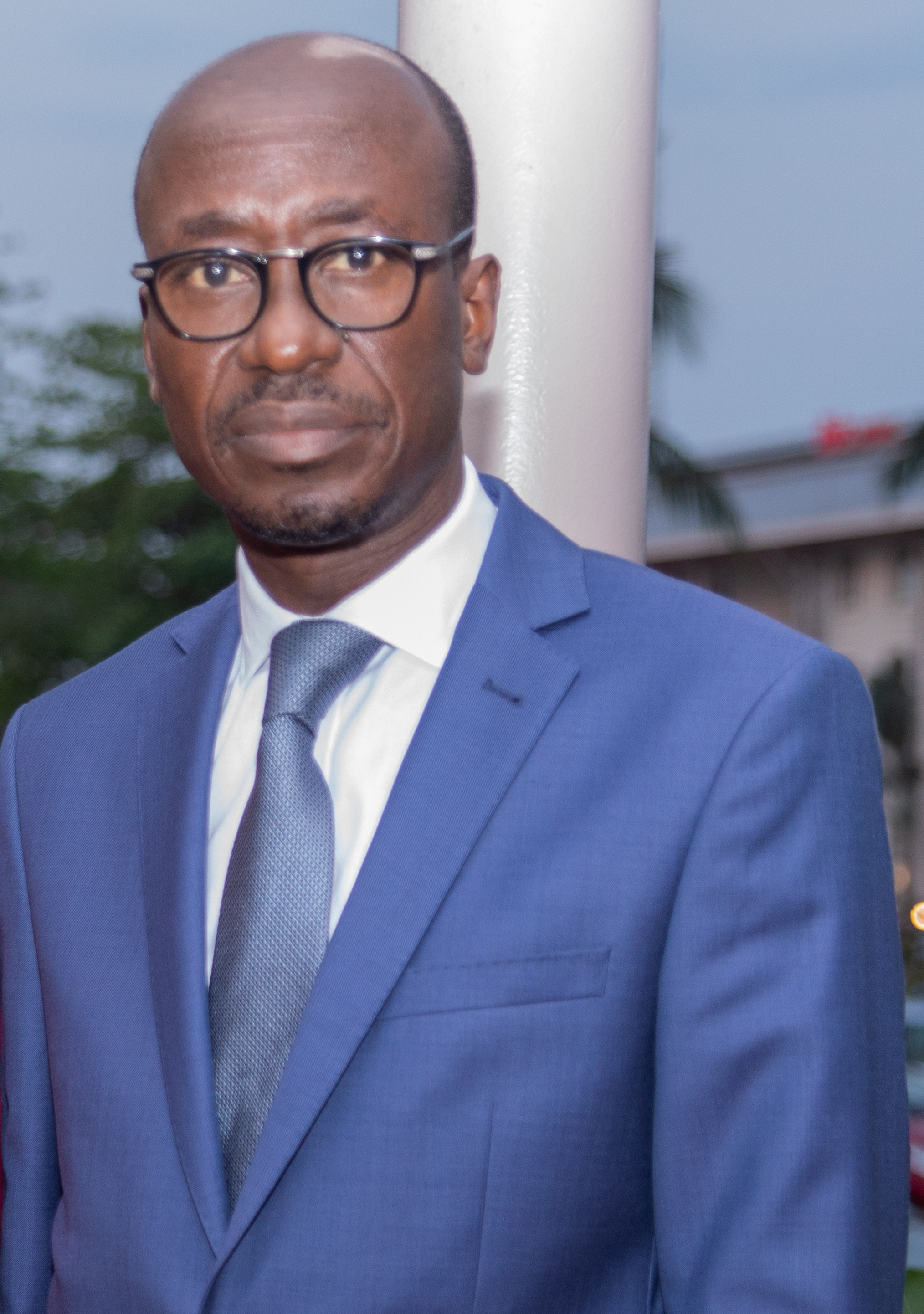

Minister of Tourism, Culture and the Arts of Benin
- Incumbent
- Assumed office 25 May 2021
- President: Patrice Talon

Personal details
- Born: 16 June 1966 (age 59) Benin
- Party: Independent

Babalola Jean-Michel Hervé Abimbola (born 16 June 1966) is a Beninese politician and educator. He is the current Minister of Tourism, Culture and the Arts in Benin, having been appointed to the position in early 2021 by the current president of Benin, Patrice Talon. His term began on 25 May 2021.

Awards and achievements
Preceded by	Minister of Tourism, Culture and the Arts of Benin	Succeeded by
