= Constitutional Court of Benin =

Highest constitutional court in Benin

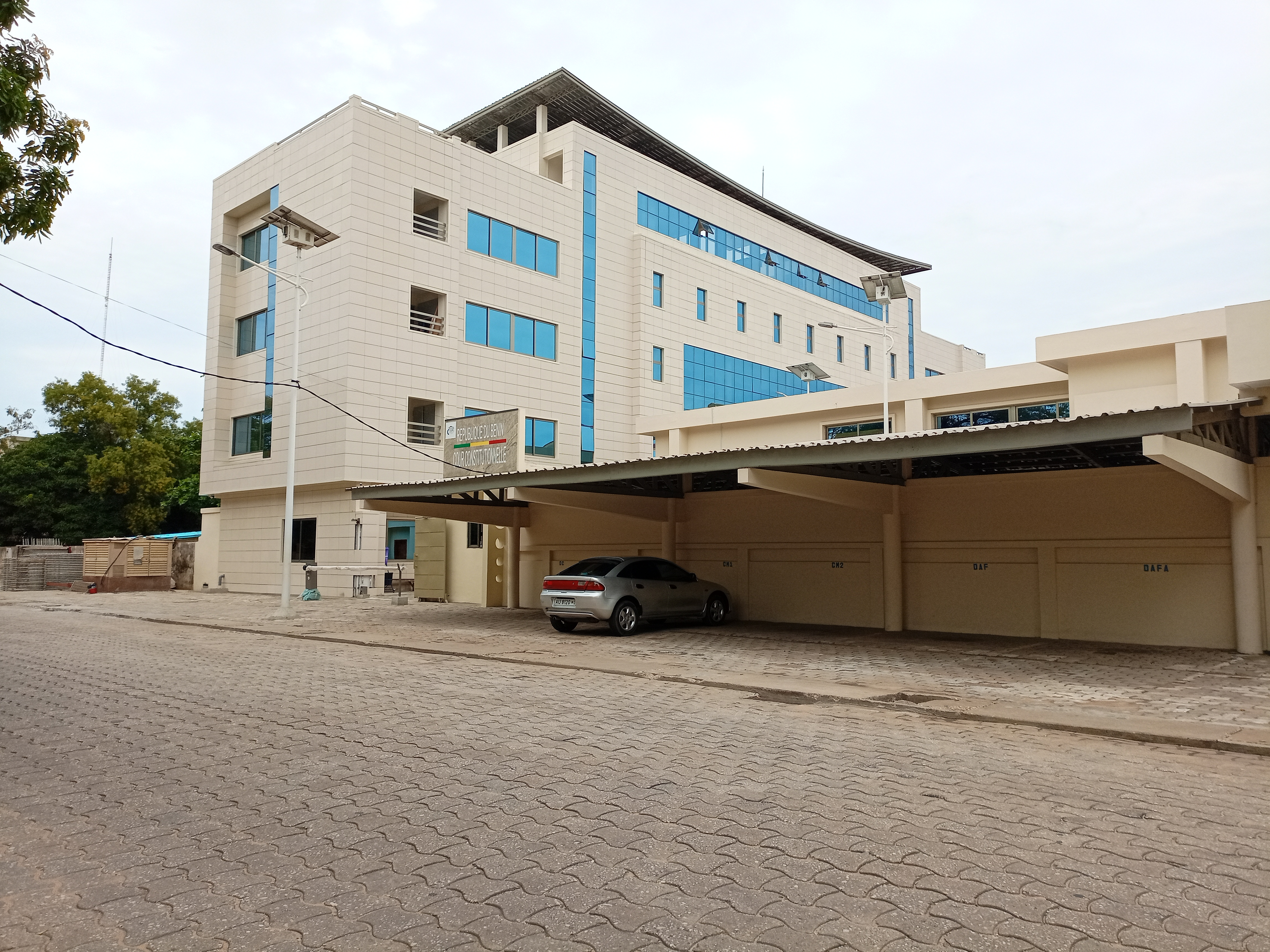
Benin Constitutional Court

The Constitutional Court is the highest authority in Benin on matters of constitutionality. Composed of seven justices, it is the body that regulates the functioning of government institutions and the activities of public figures. The court was founded in 1993 and sits in Cotonou.

== History ==
As part of Benin's transition to democracy in 1990 a conference was held to draft a new Constitution which provided limitations and separation of government powers and which created institutions that worked with one another to guarantee protection of fundamental freedoms and public freedoms.

The Constitutional Court was one of these institutions. It was founded out of a desire to have a political regime free of dictatorship and unjust, arbitrary decision-making. Instead, the goal was to have a democratic, pluralist government in which human rights, public freedom, human dignity and justice are guaranteed, protected and promoted. Installed on June 7, 1993, the court's role is to protect the Constitution and respect of the laws of the Republic.

The court mainly judges the constitutionality of laws, serves as the guarantor of fundamental rights and public liberties, and serves as the regulatory organ for the proper functioning of institutions, the legality of elections and referendums, and serve as a judge in election disputes between members of the National Assembly.

== Composition ==
The Court is composed of seven justices, four of which are nominated by the National Assembly and three by the President of the Republic. Justices serve a five-year term that can be renewed one time. Of those Justices, the court is made up of the following:

1. Three Magistrates with at least fifteen years experience. Two nominated by the National Assembly and one by the President.
2. Two high-level jurists, professors or law practitioners with at least fifteen years experience. One nominated by the National Assembly and one by the President,
3. Two professionals with good reputations. One each nominated from the National Assembly and the President.

The President of the court is elected among the sitting magistrate and jurist members of the court.

Members of the Constitutional Court are ineligible to be Ministers of the Republic, run for elective office, or other public, civil, military or professional work.

Composition of the Constitutional Court (6th Mandate beginning in June 2018)
Number	Name	Title	Quality	Nominating Institution
1	Joseph Djogbenou	President	Jurist of high level or practitioner of the law	National Assembly
2	Razacki Amouda Issifou	Vice-president	Jurist of high level or practitioner of the law	National Assembly
3	Cécile Marie José de Dravo Zinzindohoué	Councilor	Magistrate	President
4	Moustapha Fassassi	Councilor	Magistrate	National Assembly
5	Sylvain Messan Nouwatin	Councilor	Magistrate	President
6	André Katary	Councilor	Personality	National Assembly
7	Rigobert Adoumènou Azon	Councilor	Personality	President

Current members of the court were sworn in on 6 June 2018 in Sèmè City in front of the National Assembly, the President, members of the government and institutions, foreign delegations and families of the court members.

The court was previously composed of professor Théodore Holo and six other members. Marcelline Gbêha-Afouda served as the vice-president.

== List of presidents of the Constitutional Court ==
Since its creation in 1993, the court has had five presidents (of which two were women): Elisabeth Ekoué Pognon from 1993 to 1998 and Conceptia Ouinsou from 1998 to 2008. There was also an interim president, Razaki Amouda Issifou, from October 2022 - June 2023.

Term	Presidents
Since 2023	Dorothée Sossa
2018-2022	Joseph Djogbenou
2013-2018	Théodore Holo
2008-2013	Robert Dossou
2003-2008	Conceptia Ouinsou
1998-2003	Conceptia Ouinsou
1993-1998	Élisabeth Pognon

== Referral procedure ==
=== In cases of constitutionality ===
- A referral is opened by any citizens for laws, regulations, administrative acts and the violations of fundamental rights and public liberties.
- Before a law can be promulgated or a regulation be applied, members of the National Assembly, the President and heads of government institutions can refer a case to the court.
  - For authorization and ratification of international agreements, the President or the National Assembly can refer it to the court.
  - In cases of human rights/public liberty violations, the court is authorized to take the case and decides the outcome Ex officio
- In electoral matters
  - Before the election: Any citizen can refer a case to the court provided that there are no limitations in the electoral law.
  - After the election: Electoral complaints will be declared inadmissible before results have been proclaimed because it is premature.
    - Any complaint related to voting on election day must include evidence provided by voters and sent to the court.
    - After Proclamation of Results:
      - After the results have been announced, the type of the election determines the response of the court
      - With Legislative Elections, cases can be referred to the court by people registered on the electoral list or candidates from the constituency where the election took place within ten days of the proclamation of results by the Constitutional Court (pursuant to Article 55 of Organic Law 91-009).
        - Any complaint received after the ten day period is considered inadmissible (except for special cases).
      - In the first round of Presidential elections, any candidate can open a complaint
      - During the second round of presidential elections, only the top two candidates may open complaints.
- For a Constitutional Advisory decision: Only the President of the Republic or the President of the National Assembly may ask the court for an advisory decision on constitutionality. Thus, no private citizen may refer an advisory case to the Court.

== Decisions ==
=== Controversy on the right to strike ===
Since the creation of the court, its decisions on the right of Beninese workers to strike have been controversial. This is due to differing interpretations of Article 31 of the Constitution:

The State recognizes and guarantees the right to strike. Any worker may defend, under the conditions provided for by law, his rights and interests either individually, collectively or through trade union action. The right to strike is exercised under the conditions defined by law.

According to a decision by then Chief Justice Conceptia Ouinsou, any law that forbids strikes is unconstitutional. The court under Chief Justice Théodore Holo ruled similarly in a January 2018 decision. However, the court under Robert Dossou and Joseph Djogbenou have rendered decisions in favor of forbidding strikes from certain categories of workers.

=== Dangnivo Affair ===
The court was also referred a case by defendants in the Dangnivo Affair, following a long pre-trial detention. The court determined on January 23, 2020, that the length of pretrial detention without a lower court ruling of guilt constituted a violation of the defendants rights to a speedy trial.
