= Joseph Djogbenou =

Beninese politician

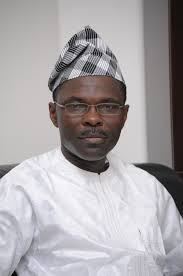

President of the National Assembly
- Incumbent
- Assumed office 8 February 2026
- Preceded by: Louis Vlavonou

President of Progressive Union for Renewal
- Incumbent
- Assumed office 16 July 2022
- Preceded by: Bruno Amoussou

President of the Constitutional Court of Benin
- In office 8 June 2018 – 12 July 2022
- Preceded by: Théodore Holo
- Succeeded by: Razaki Amouda

Minister of Justice
- In office 7 April 2016 – 5 May 2018
- President: Patrice Talon
- Preceded by: Valentin Djènontin
- Succeeded by: Sévérin Quenum

Personal details
- Born: 20 March 1969 (age 57) Abomey, Dahomey
- Party: Progressive Union for Renewal
- Education: University of Abomey-Calavi
- Profession: Lawyer

Joseph Fifamè Djogbénou (born 20 March 1969), is a Beninese politician, lawyer and academic who is the current President of the National Assembly as well as the president of the Progressive Union for Renewal party. Djogbénou was the President of the Constitutional Court of Benin from 7 June 2018 until his resignation on 12 July 2022. He was the personal lawyer of Patrice Talon. He was Minister of Justice between 2016 and 2018.
