= List of buildings and structures in Benin =

This is a list of notable buildings and structures in Benin:

== Cotonou and suburbs ==
=== Banks ===
- BCEAO Tower (Cotonou)

=== Hotels ===
- Benin Marina

=== Markets ===
- Dantokpa Market

=== Places of worship ===
- Cotonou Cathedral
- Cotonou Central Mosque

=== Universities and education ===
- National University of Benin

=== Other ===
- Ancien Pont Bridge
- Cotonou Friendship Stadium
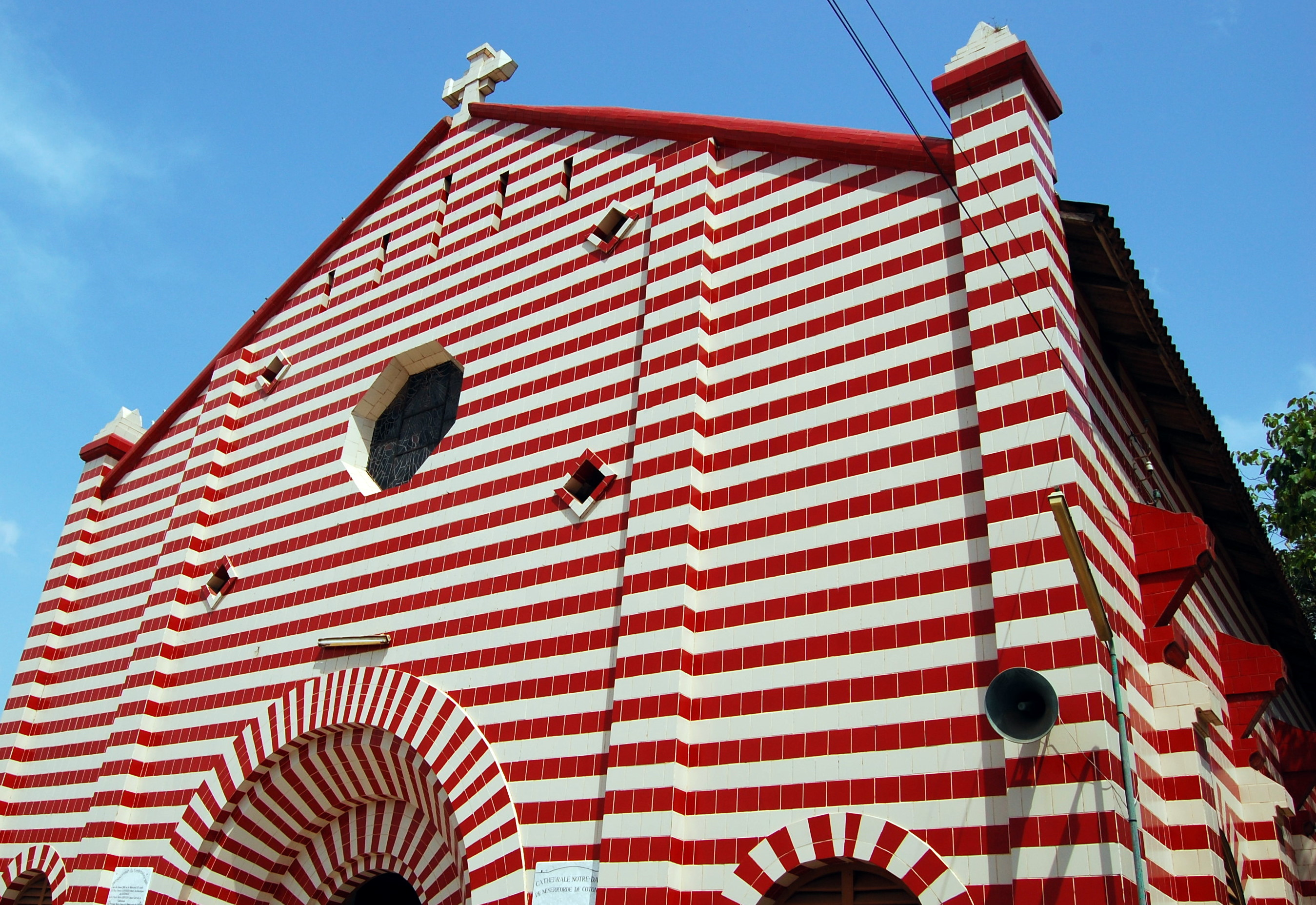
Cotonou Cathedral

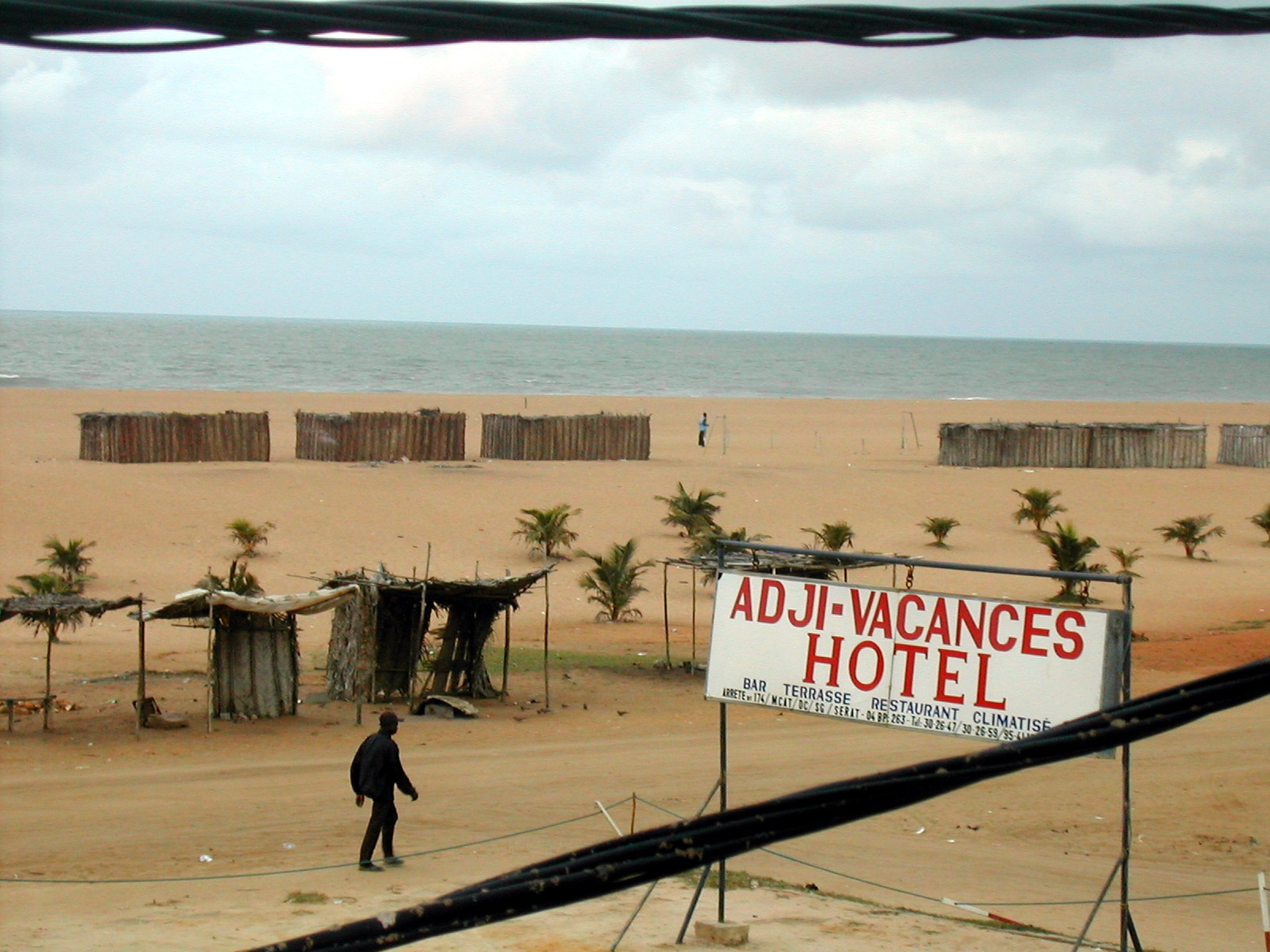
Adji-Vacances Hotel

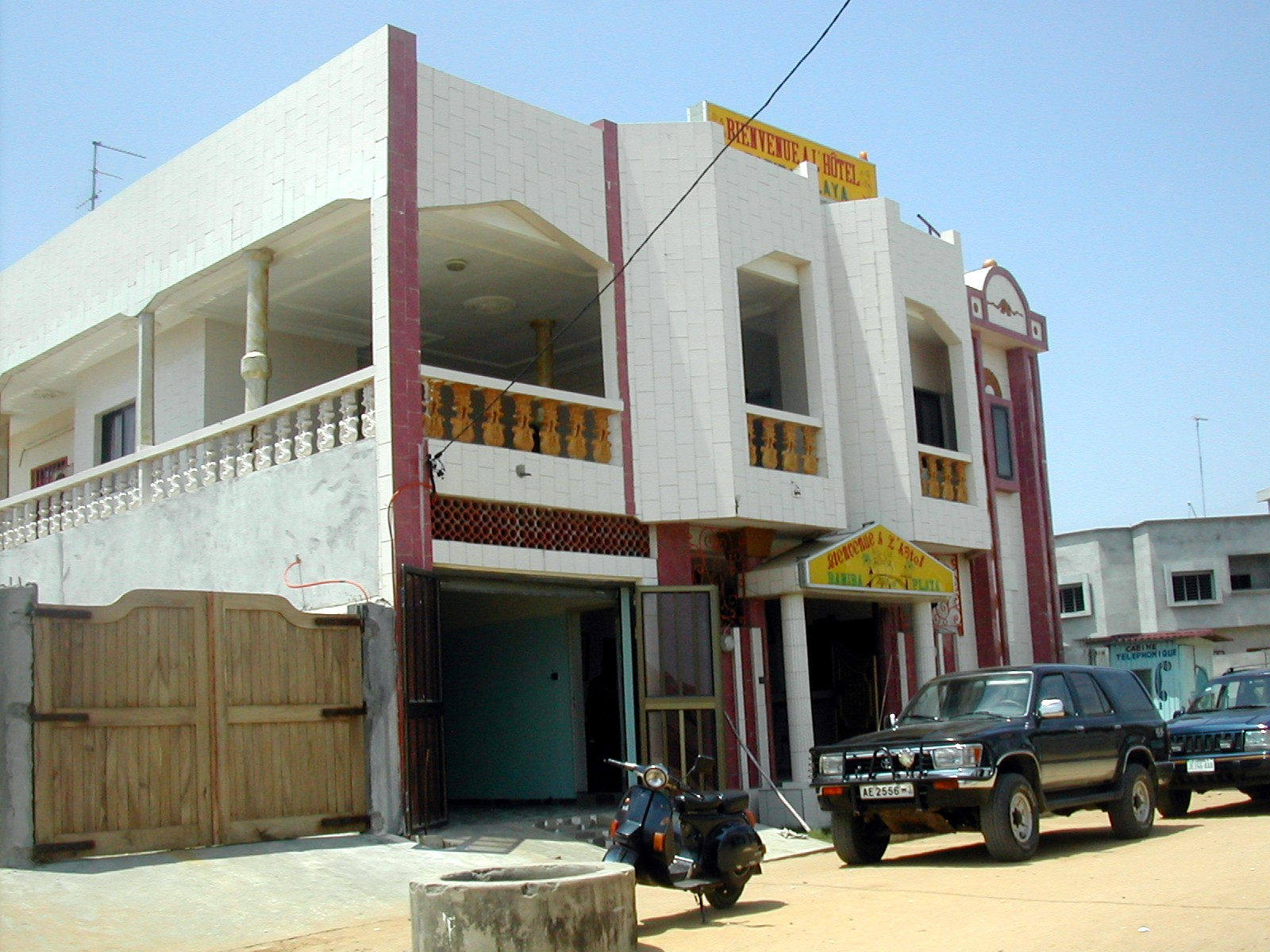
Hotel Babiya Playa

== Parakou ==
- Musée en Plein Air de Parakou

== Porto-Novo ==
- King Toffa's Palace
- Porto Novo Museum of Ethnography
