= Timeline of Cotonou =

The following is a timeline of the history of the city of Cotonou, Benin.

== Prior to 20th century ==
- 1830 - Cotonou founded as a "slaving port."
- 1878 - Cotonou "ceded to France."
- 1883 - French occupation.
- 1899 - Wharf built.

== 20th century ==
- 1904 - Cotonou becomes part of colonial French Dahomey.
- 1908 - Deepwater harbor opens.
- 1912 - Cotonou becomes a "commune mixte."
- 1920s - Population: 8,500.
- 1928 - Ancien Pont (bridge) built.
- 1955 - Catholic Metropolitan Archdiocese of Cotonou established.
- 1957 - January: Pan-African General Union of Negro African Workers founded at a conference in Cotonou.
- 1960s - Tomety photo studio in operation.
- 1963
  - Dantokpa Market established.
  - Presidential Palace built.
- 1964
  - L'action populaire newspaper begins publication.
  - Nigerian Yoruba Community-Cotonou organization formed.
- 1965 - Port constructed.
- 1967 - Les Muses theatre troupe formed.
- 1968 - Orchestre Poly Rythmo de Cotonou (musical group) and Société Béninoise de Textiles established in Cotonou.
- 1970 - Université du Dahomey founded.
- 1975 - City becomes part of the People's Republic of Benin.
- 1980 - Association des écrivains et critiques littéraires du Bénin founded.
- 1981 - Population: 383,250 (estimate).
- 1982 - Stade de l'Amitié (stadium) opens.
- 1988 - Musée olympique du Bénin opens.
- 1986 - Sister city relationship established with Salvador, Brazil.
- 1990 - February: Benin constitutional conference held.
- 1992 - Population: 536,827.
- 1995
  - Centre de conferences international opens.
  - December: Meeting of the Organisation internationale de la Francophonie held in city.
- 1996 - University of Science and Technology of Benin established.

== 21st century ==
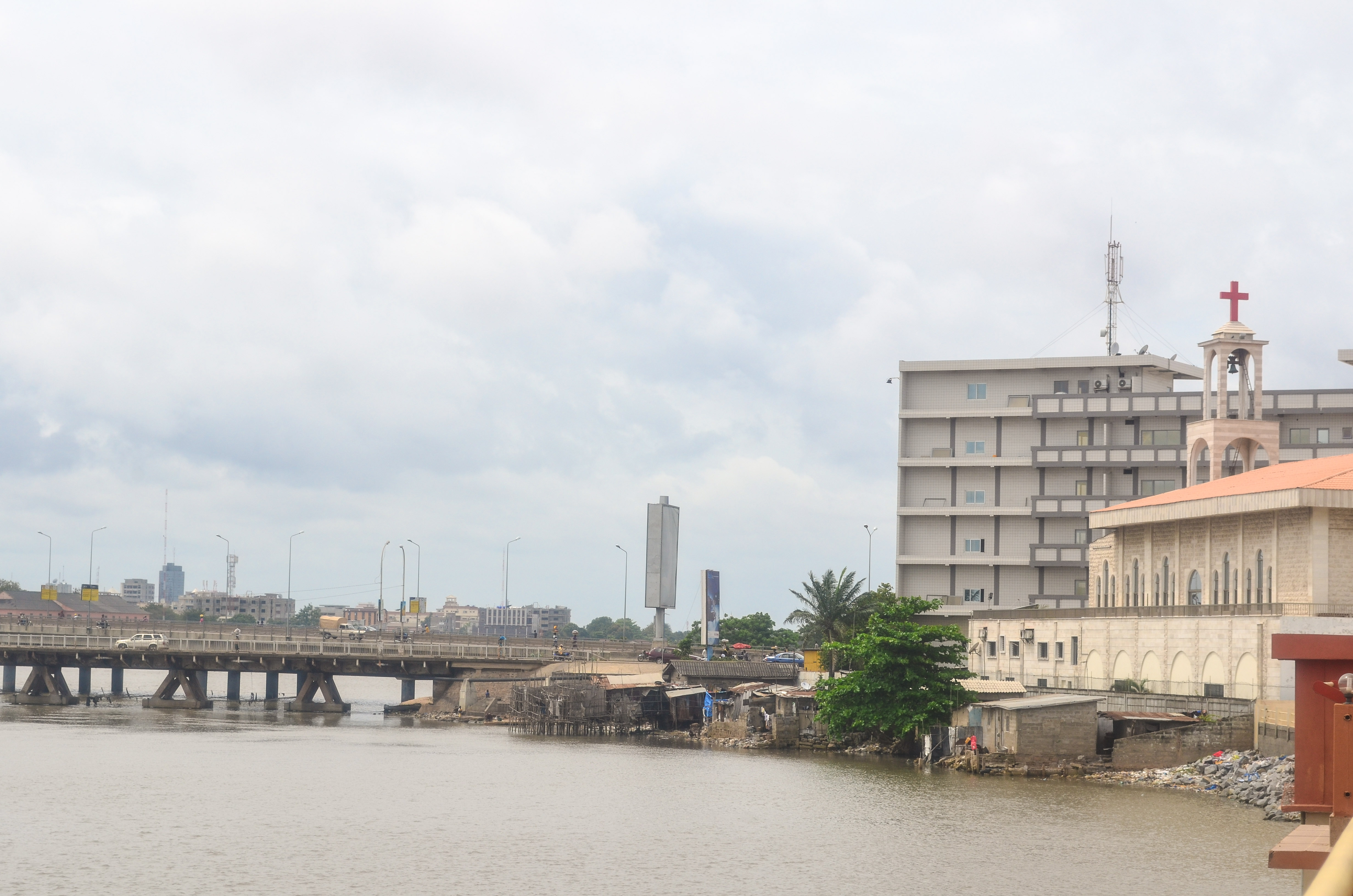
Cotonou, 2013

- 2001 - L'Informateur newspaper begins publication.
- 2002 - Maison des Médias du Bénin founded.
- 2003
  - 25 December: Airplane crash.
  - Nicéphore Soglo becomes mayor.
- 2005 - Fondation Zinsou (museum) opens.
- 2009 - Population: 815,041.
- 2011 - Population: 924,000.
- 2013 - Population: 679,012.

== Bibliography ==
=== in English ===
- R. Cornevin (1980). "Kotonou". In C.E. Bosworth; et al. (eds.). Encyclopaedia of Islam. Vol. 5. Leiden: Brill.
- "Benin: Cotonou", West Africa (4th ed.), Lonely Planet, 1999, OL 8314753M
- Paul Tiyambe Zeleza; Dickson Eyoh, eds. (2003). "Cotonou, Benin". Encyclopedia of Twentieth-Century African History. Routledge. ISBN 0-415-23479-4.
- J. Joost Beuving and Joost Beuving (2004). "Cotonou's Klondike: African Traders and Second-Hand Car Markets in Bénin". Journal of Modern African Studies. 42 (4): 511–537. doi:10.1017/S0022278X04000382. JSTOR 3876137. S2CID 153955180.
- J. Joost Beuving (2006). "Lebanese Traders in Cotonou: A Socio-Cultural Analysis of Economic Mobility and Capital Accumulation". Africa: Journal of the International African Institute. 76 (3): 324–351. doi:10.3366/afr.2006.0036. JSTOR 40022740. S2CID 56422479.
- "Cotonou". Benin. Bradt Travel Guides. 2006. ISBN 978-1-84162-148-7.

=== in French ===
- Paule Brasseur-Marion (1953). "Cotonou porte du Dahomey". Cahiers d'Outre-Mer (in French). 6 – via Persee.fr.
- Gautier Pirotte; Marc Poncelet (2003). "Société civile et nouvelle gouvernance au Bénin: Quelques réflexions illustrées à partir de l'analyse du nouveau secteur ONG à Cotonou". Bulletin de l'APAD (in French). 26 – via Revues.org.
- Sébastien Dossa Sotindjo (2009). Cotonou: l'explosion d'une capitale économique, 1945-1985 (in French). Paris: L'Harmattan. ISBN 978-2-296-11151-6.
- Auzias, Dominique; Labourdette, Jean-Paul (2011). "Cotonou". Benin. Le Petit Futé (in French). ISBN 978-2-7469-2924-1.
