= Tététou =

- city
- Interactive map of Tététou
- Coordinates: 7°00′50″N 1°30′05″E
- Country: Togo

Tététou is a Togolese municipality located in the Haho Prefecture, in the Plateaux Region, southeastern Togo. The municipality is situated in the center of the protected forest of Tététou.

== Hydrography ==
The municipality is situated on the Mono River, one of the major rivers of the country. It is located downstream of the Nangbeto Dam.

== History ==
=== Colonization ===
During the colonial period under German and French rule, the region where the municipality is located experienced significant demographic changes. German forces temporarily occupied Tététou during World War I before being ousted from the area.

In the 1920s, the region was colonized by the Kabye people with the approval of European colonial authorities, who saw it as a way to settle labor in a relatively sparsely populated area. The municipality produced cotton, which was collected by French colonists and transported via a railway to Notsé. From there, it was directed to colony ports for export to metropolitan France.

=== Post-colonial Togo ===
After the construction of the Nangbeto Dam, the municipality faced challenges related to its reservoir filling, but these issues diminished over time. The commune also had strong ties with neighboring Benin until it became more connected to the rest of Togo. In the early 21st century, tensions arose due to land acquisitions by large landowners from urban areas, creating friction among various peoples in the region, particularly between the Ewe and Aja communities.

Togo established a classified forest named Tététou forest. To address regional energy needs, in 2019-2020, construction began on a hydroelectric power plant in the area, intended to have a capacity of 24MW upon completion.
