= Union of Baptist Churches of Benin =

Baptist Christian denomination in Benin

- Union des Églises Baptistes du Bénin
- Abbreviation: UEBB
- Classification: Evangelical Christianity
- Theology: Baptist
- Associations: Baptist World Alliance
- Headquarters: Cotonou, Benin
- Origin: 1990
- Congregations: 378
- Members: 11,831
- Seminaries: Baptist Bible Institute of Benin in Bohicon

The Union of Baptist Churches of Benin (French: Union des Églises Baptistes du Bénin) is a Baptist Christian denomination in Benin. It is affiliated with the Baptist World Alliance. The headquarters is in Cotonou.

== History ==
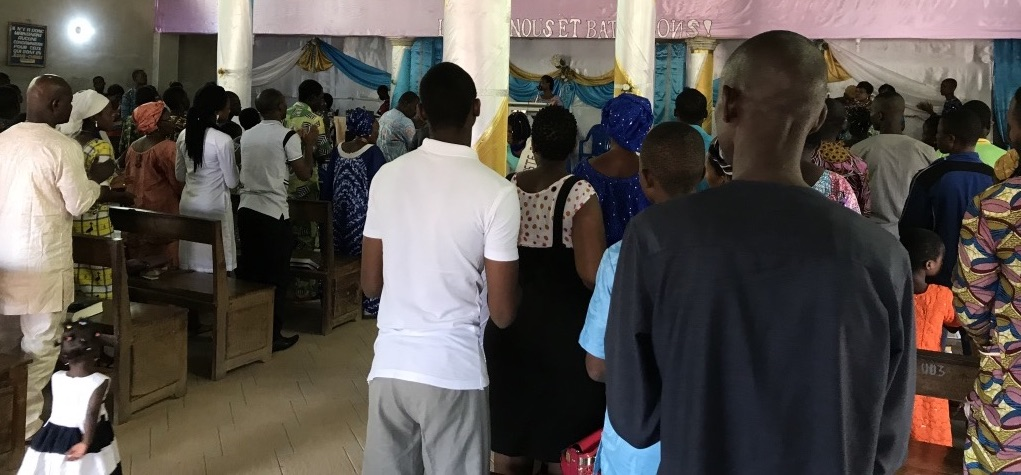
Worship service at Baptist Church of Sèmè in Abomey-Calavi.

The Union has its origins in an American mission of the International Mission Board in 1971. The Union was officially founded in 1990 in Abomey. In 1997, it founded the Baptist Bible Institute of Benin in Bohicon In 2018, it founded the network "Business Leaders and Baptist Executives of Benin (CECAB)" to promote development actions in the Union. According to a census published by the association in 2023, it claimed 378 churches and 11,831 members.

== Bibliography ==
- G. Georges Lokonon, Histoire des baptistes au Dahomey-Bénin (1970 - 2010), Éditions universitaires européennes, 2019.
