= BCEAO Tower (Cotonou) =

High-rise building in Benin

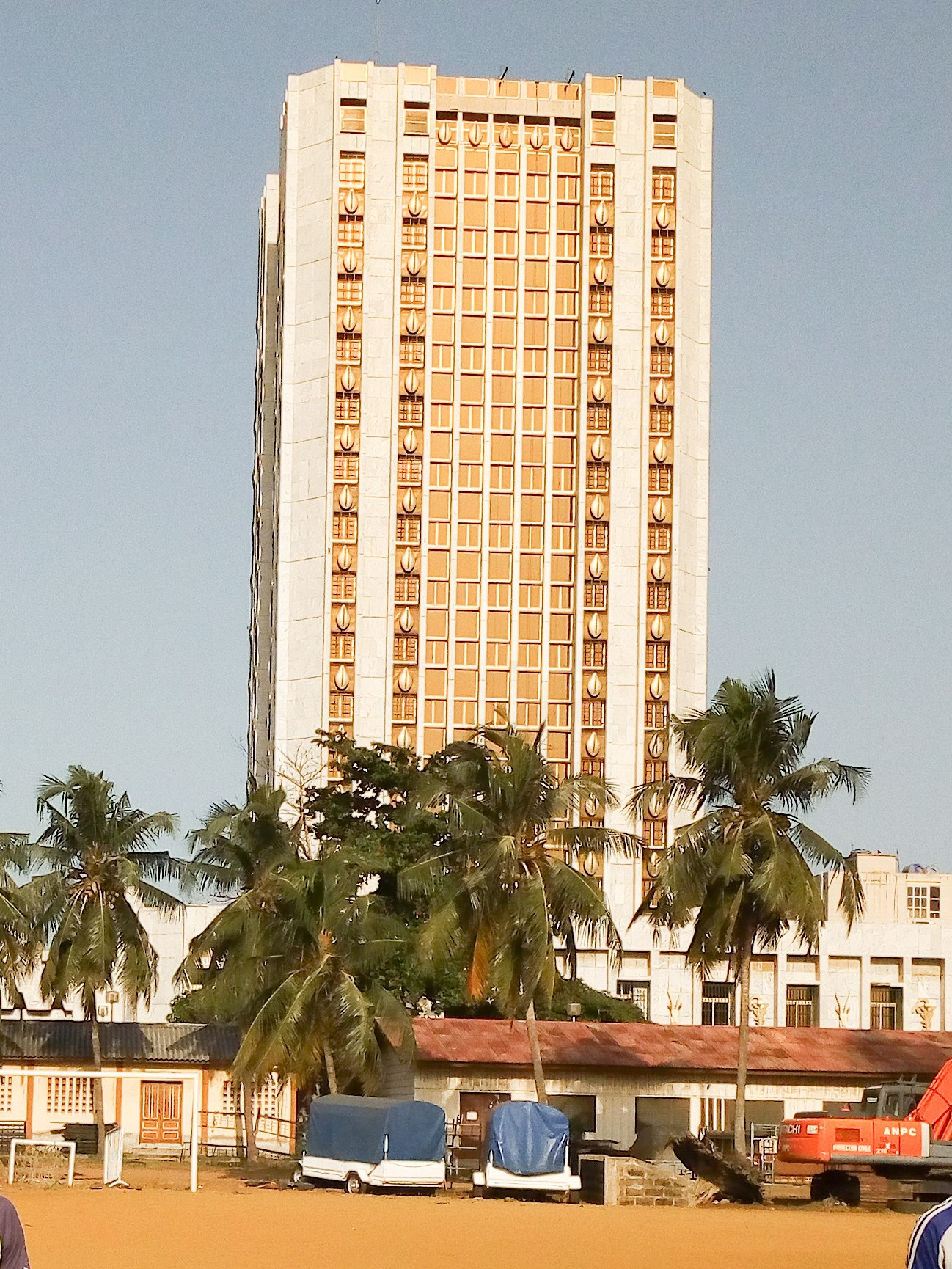

General information
- Status: Completed
- Type: Office
- Location: Cotonou, Benin, 9C3G+9JV Cotonou, Benin
- Coordinates: 6.35346°N 2.42647°E
- Completed: 1994

Height
- Roof: 64 m (210 ft)

Technical details
- Structural system: Concrete
- Floor count: 16

Design and construction
- Main contractor: Olatunde Isaac

The BCEAO Tower (abbreviated from Le Banque Centrale des Etates de L'Afrique de L'Ouest) is a high-rise office building in Cotonou, Benin. Inaugurated in 1994, the building stands at 64 m (210 ft) tall with 16 floors and is the current tallest building in Benin. It serves as the headquarters of the Benin filiale of the Central Bank of West African States.

== Architecture ==
The building features traditional African cultural symbols on its facades such as the cowrie shells, which acted as units of currency in the depth of history. They were ensnared by the market's requirements, adopting a new position under the control of overseas traders.

== See also ==
- List of buildings and structures in Benin
- List of tallest buildings by country
- BCEAO Tower (Bamako)
