= Benin Marina =

Hotel in Cotonou, Benin

Coordinates: 6°20′55″N 2°23′42″E

Benin Marina was a four-star hotel in Cotonou, Benin. It was located at Boulevard De La Marina, B.P. 1901 in the Haie Vive neighborhood, near the Cadjehoun Airport and the Erevan Shopping Center. It was the largest hotel in the country. It was located in a large building which was formerly a Sheraton hotel, west of the old port of Cotonou. Set in landscaped gardens, the hotel contained two swimming pools, three tennis courts and small 9-hole golf course. The building was only four storeys high but covered a significant area of land. The swimming pool was located next to the beach. The hotel had 200 rooms, 1 Royal Suite, 8 Junior Suites and 12 bungalows. The hotel contained the 'Le Popo' Coffeeshop Restaurant, 'Les Tanekas' Grill Bar by the pool, 'Le Nokoué' Pianobar and the 'Le Tèkè' Night Club / Karaoke Bar. The hotel was occasionally used for important diplomatic meetings in Cotonou and contained 1 conference room and 6 meeting rooms.

The hotel was closed and demolished in 2019. Its former site was reused for the construction of another hotel, the luxury Sofitel Cotonou Marina Hotel & Spa, which opened in 2024.
