= Cotonou Cathedral =

Catholic Latin Church cathedral in Benin

Our Lady of Mercy
- Cathedral of Our Lady of Mercy
- Cotonou Cathedral
- Cathédrale Notre-Dame-de-Miséricorde
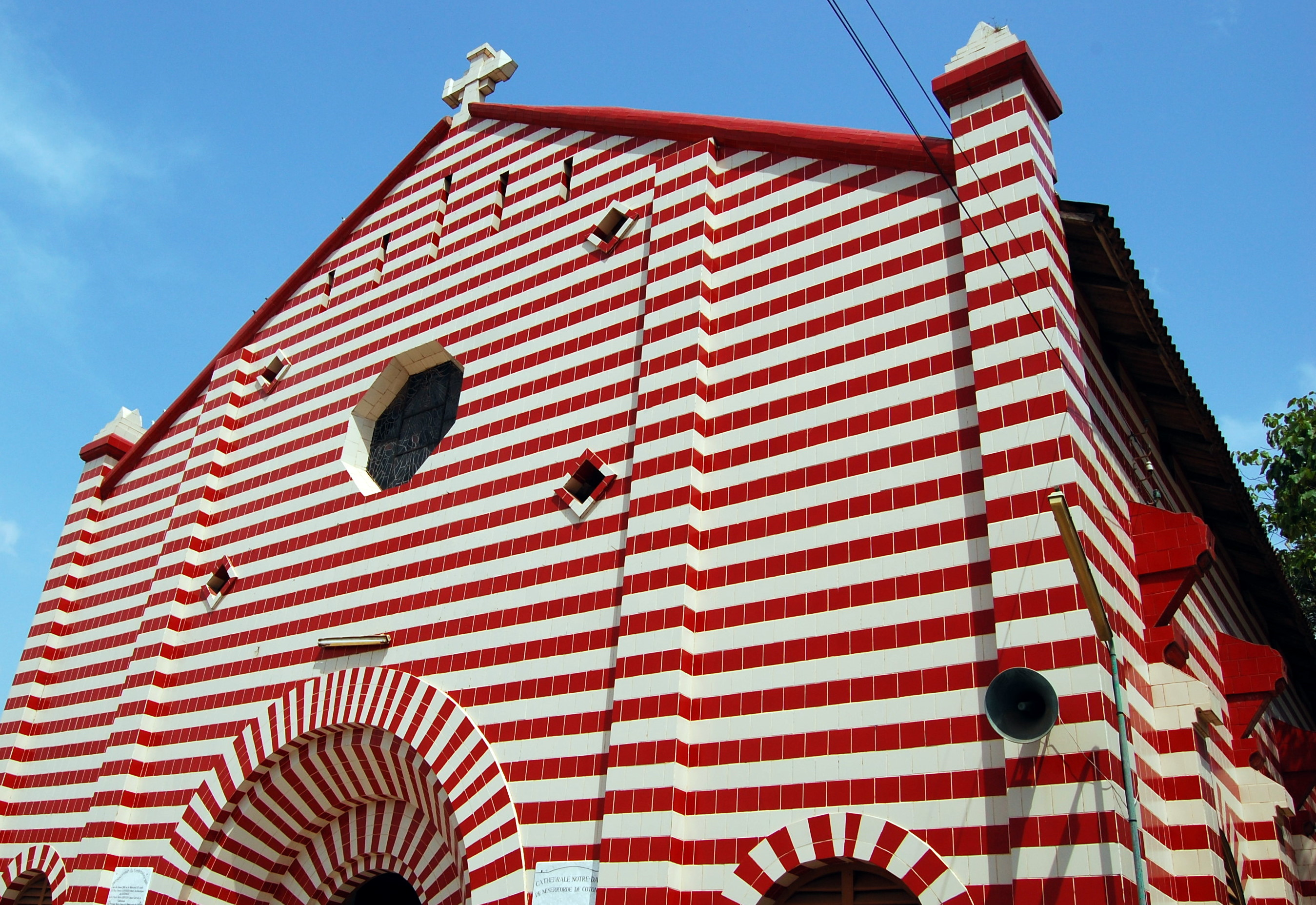
- Our Lady of Mercy
- 6.357282°N 2.440073°E
- Location: Cotonou
- Country: Benin
- Denomination: Catholic
- Sui iuris church: Latin Church
- Tradition: Roman Rite
- Website: archidiocesedecotonou.org/cathedrale-ndm/

History
- Status: Cathedral
- Dedication: Notre-Dame-de-Miséricorde (Our Lady of Mercy)

Architecture
- Functional status: Active
- Groundbreaking: 1912

Administration
- Archdiocese: Cotonou

Clergy
- Pastor: Antoine Metin

The cathedral of Notre Dame de Miséricorde, commonly known as Cotonou Cathedral, is a Catholic cathedral located near the Ancien Pont bridge in Cotonou, Benin. It is renowned for its distinctive burgundy and white striped tiled architecture. The cathedral's tower is situated at the rear-left side of the main building.

The cathedral serves as the seat of the Latin Church archdiocese of Cotonou. The archdiocese was originally established on 26 June 1883 as the Apostolic Prefecture of Dahomey, carved out from the Apostolic Vicariate of Benin Coast, Nigeria. After undergoing several name changes under Dahomey, it was elevated to the Metropolitan Archdiocese of Cotonou on 14 September 1955.

== Gallery ==
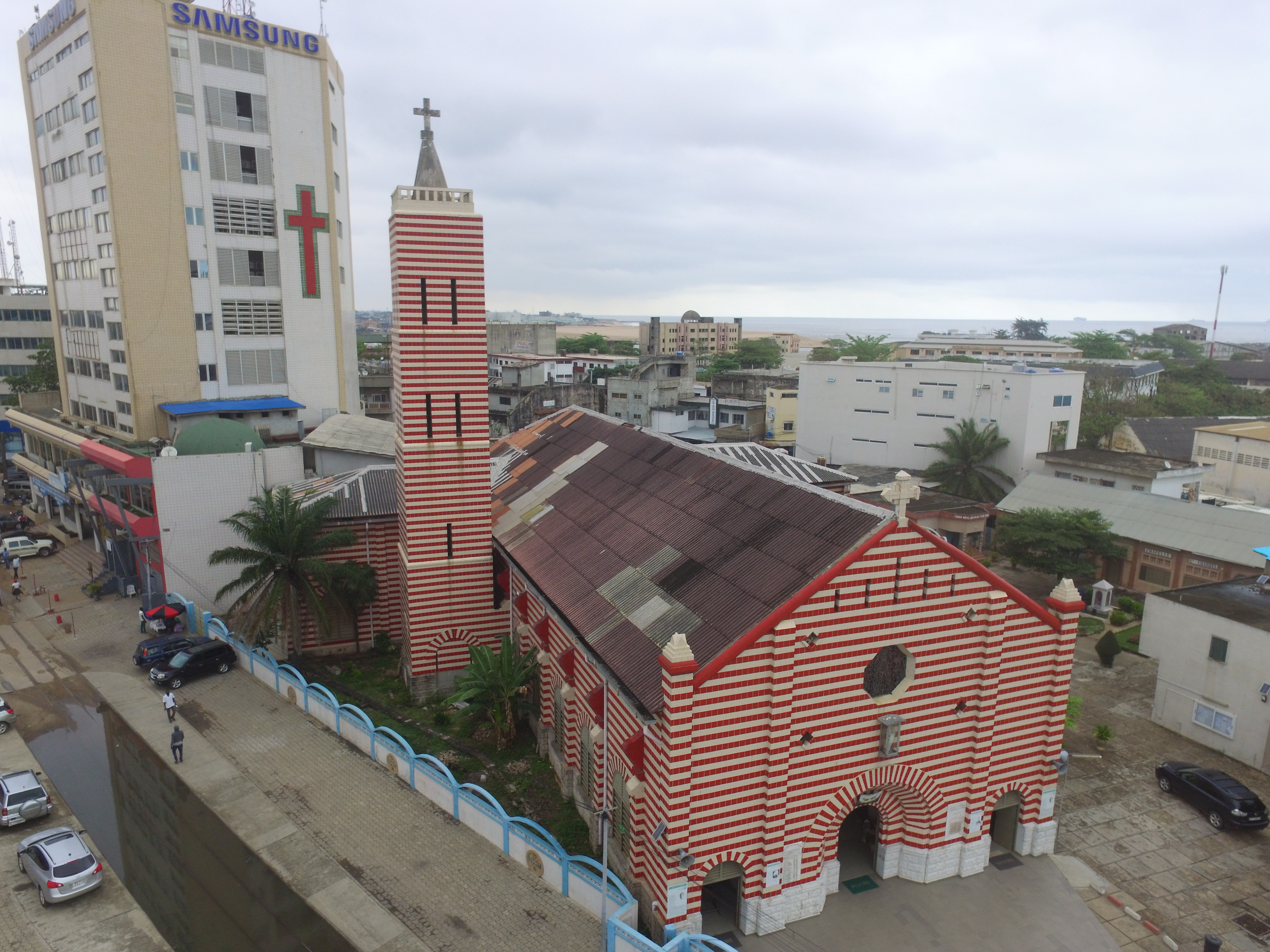
Exterior view of the Cathedral of Our Lady of Mercy in Cotonou

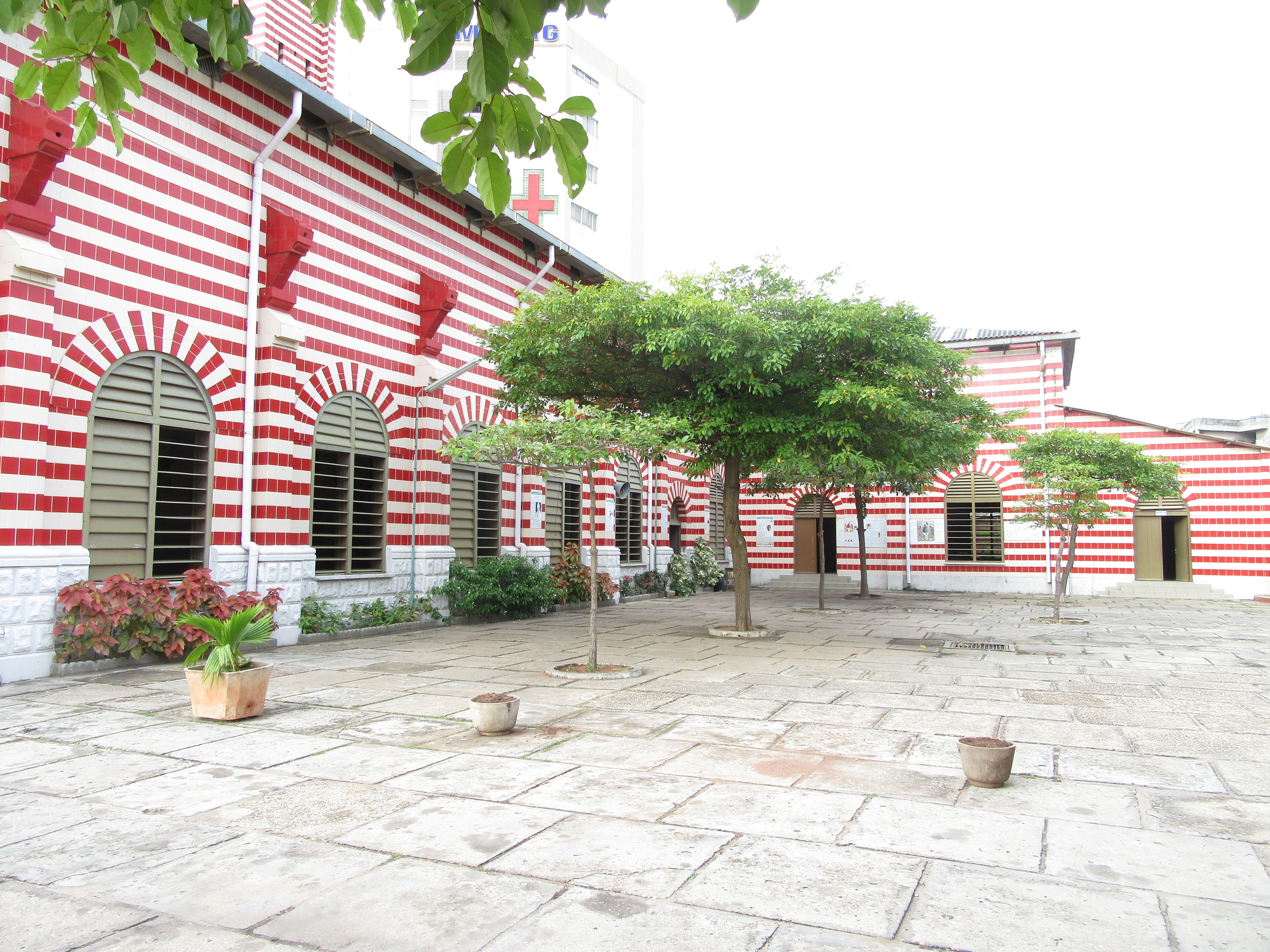
Courtyard of the Cathedral of Our Lady of Mercy in Cotonou

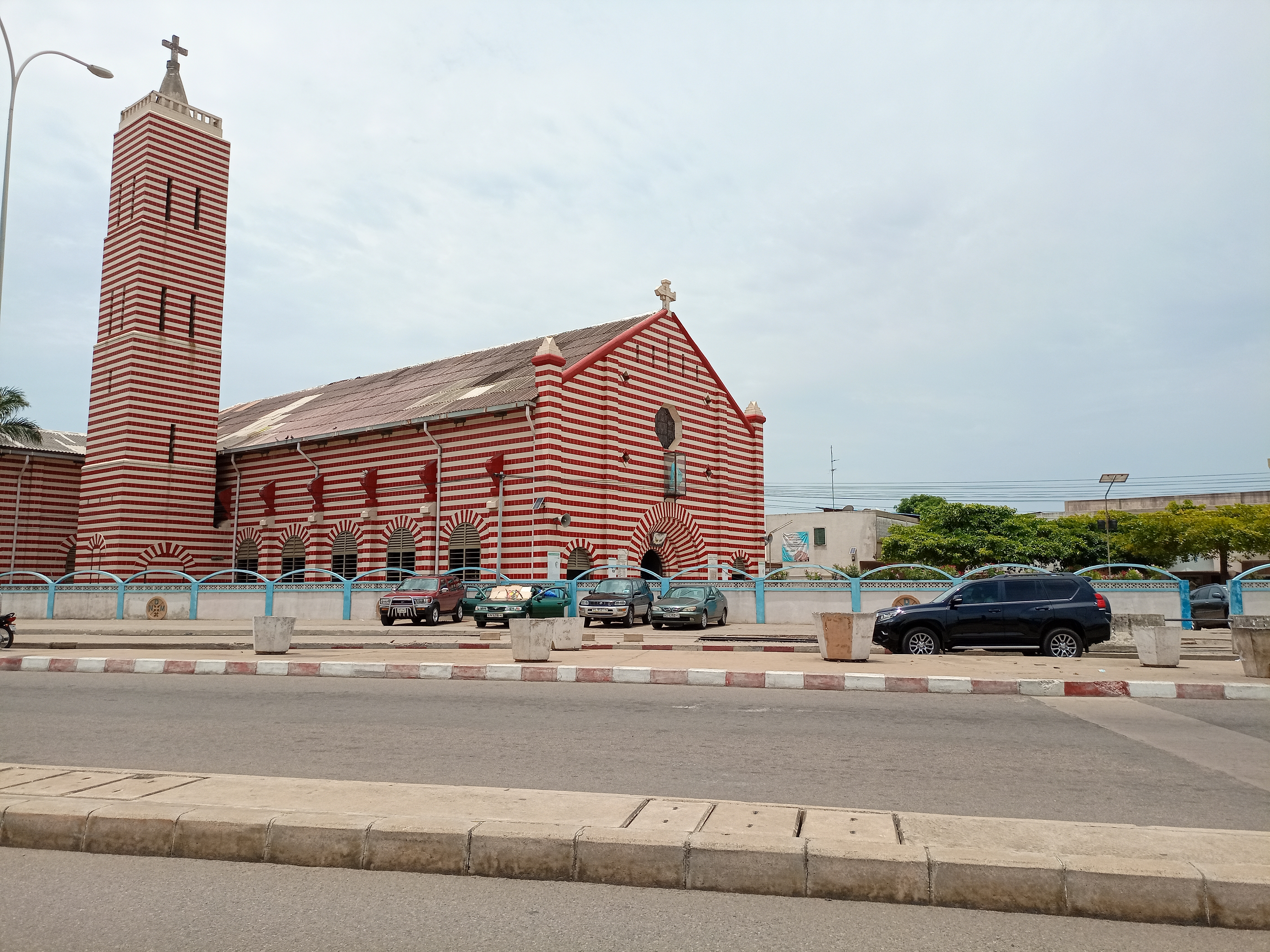
Cathedral of Our Lady of Mercy in Cotonou seen from the road

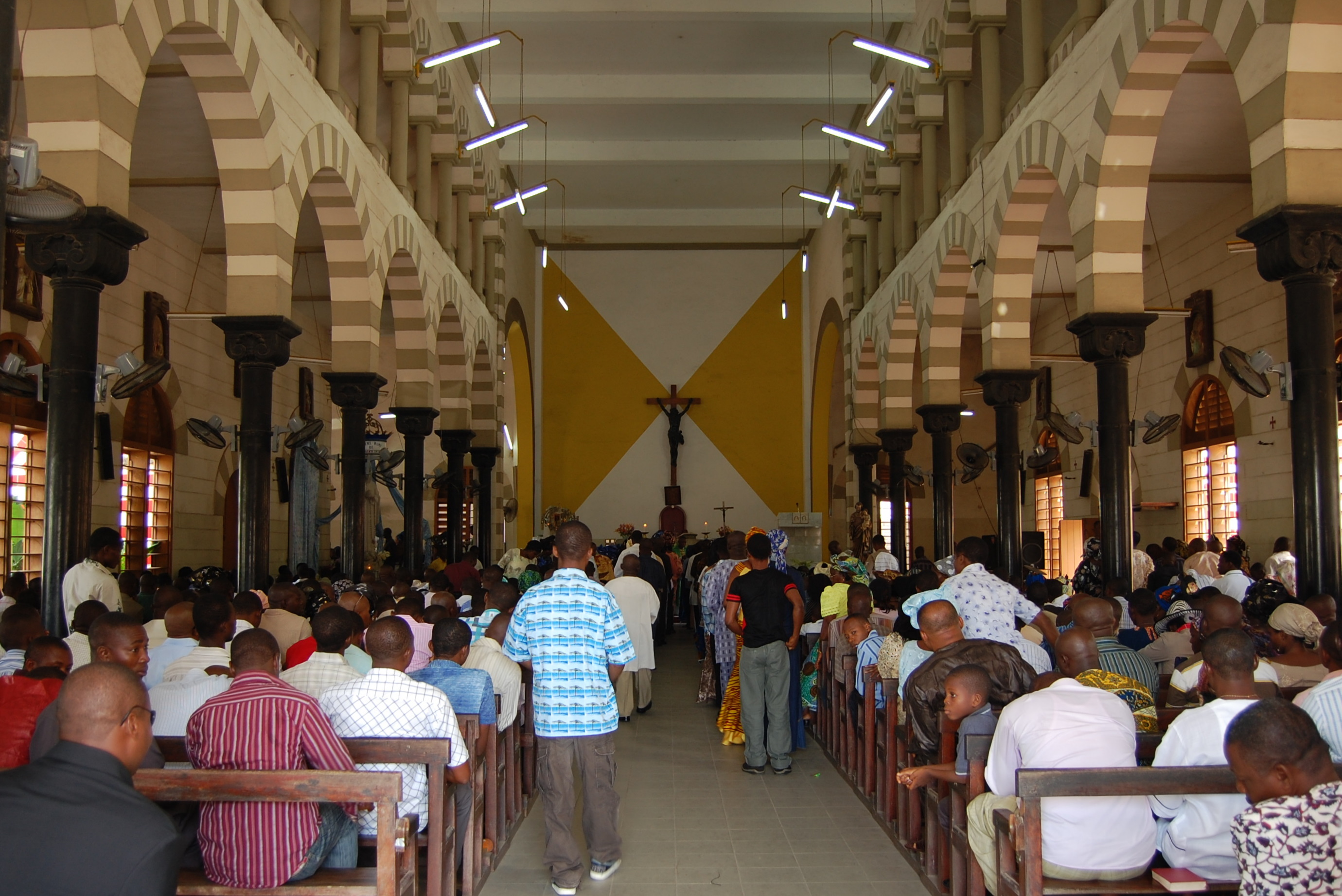
Interior of the Cathedral of Our Lady of Mercy in Cotonou (2007)

Cathedral of Our Lady of Mercy in Cotonou (1972)
