= Cotonou =

Largest city in Benin

Cotonou Kútɔ̀nú (Fon)
- City
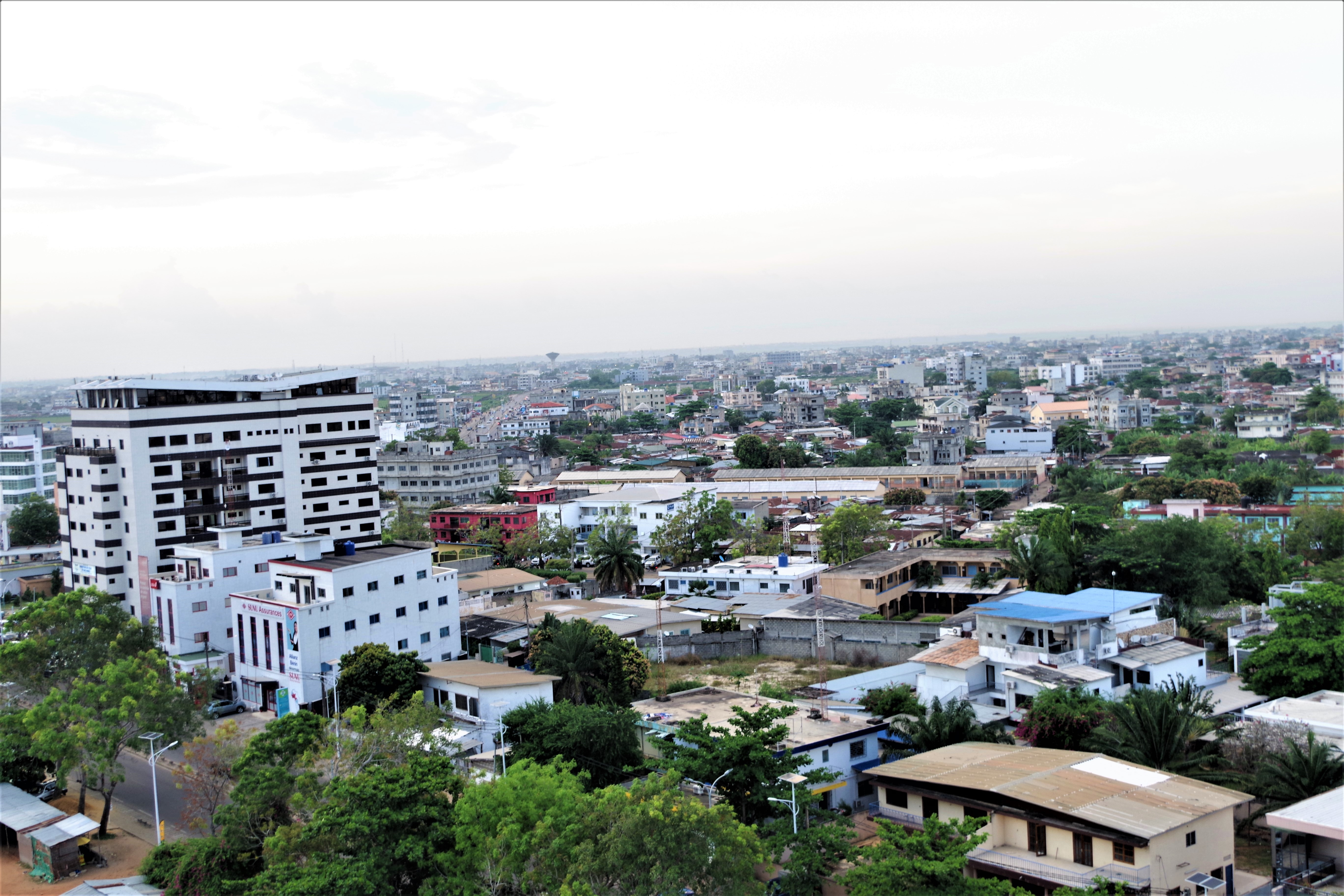
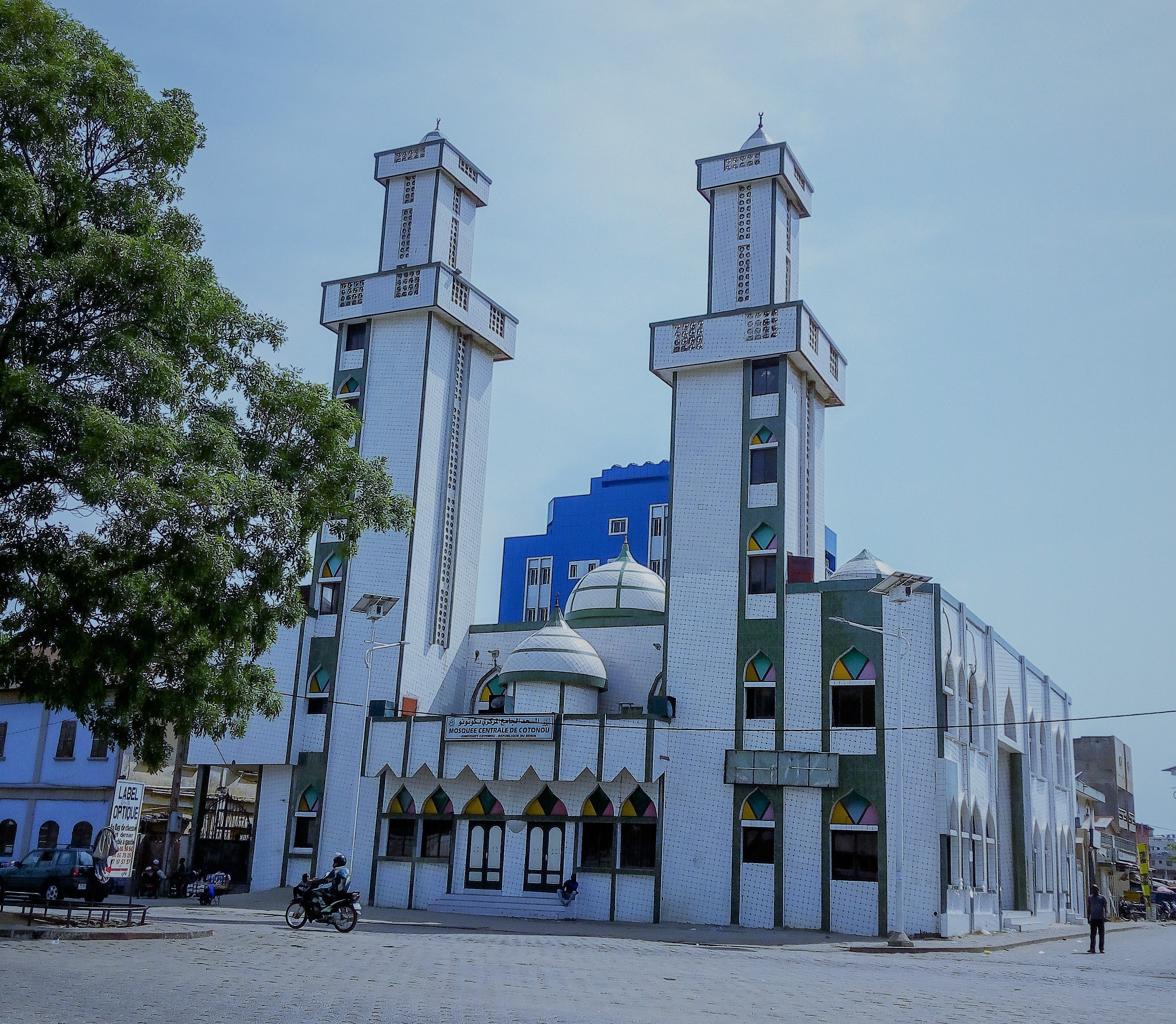
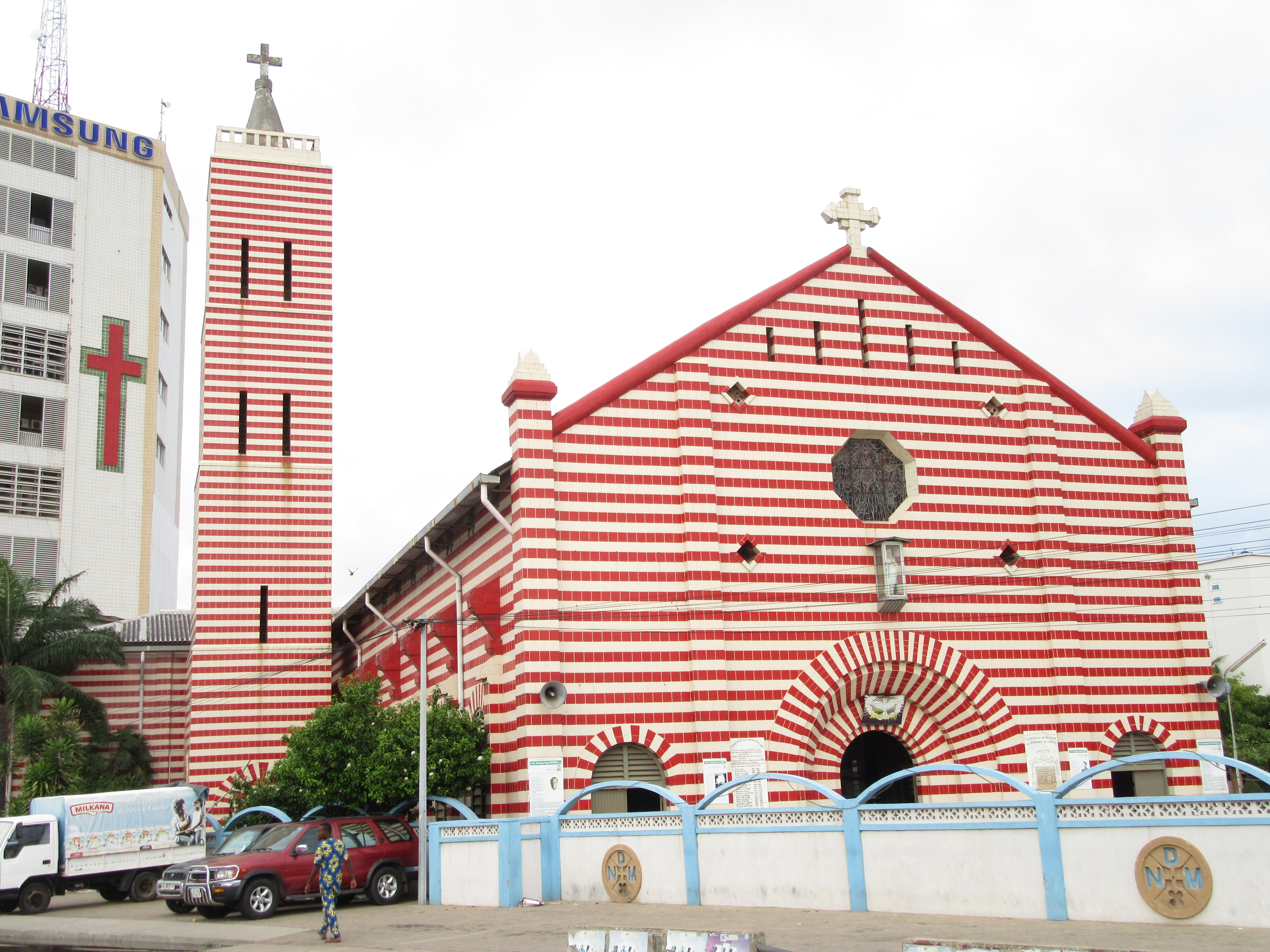
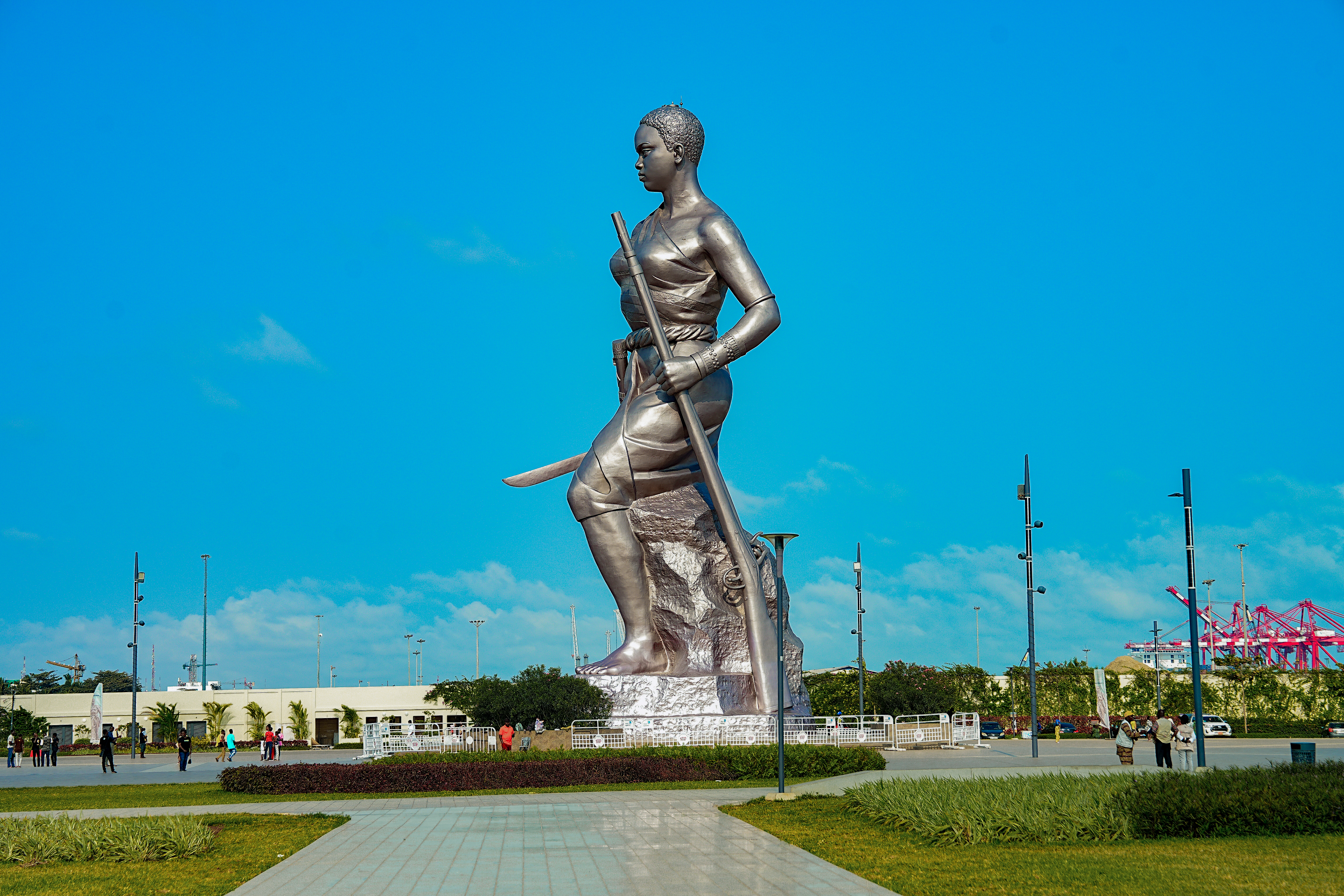
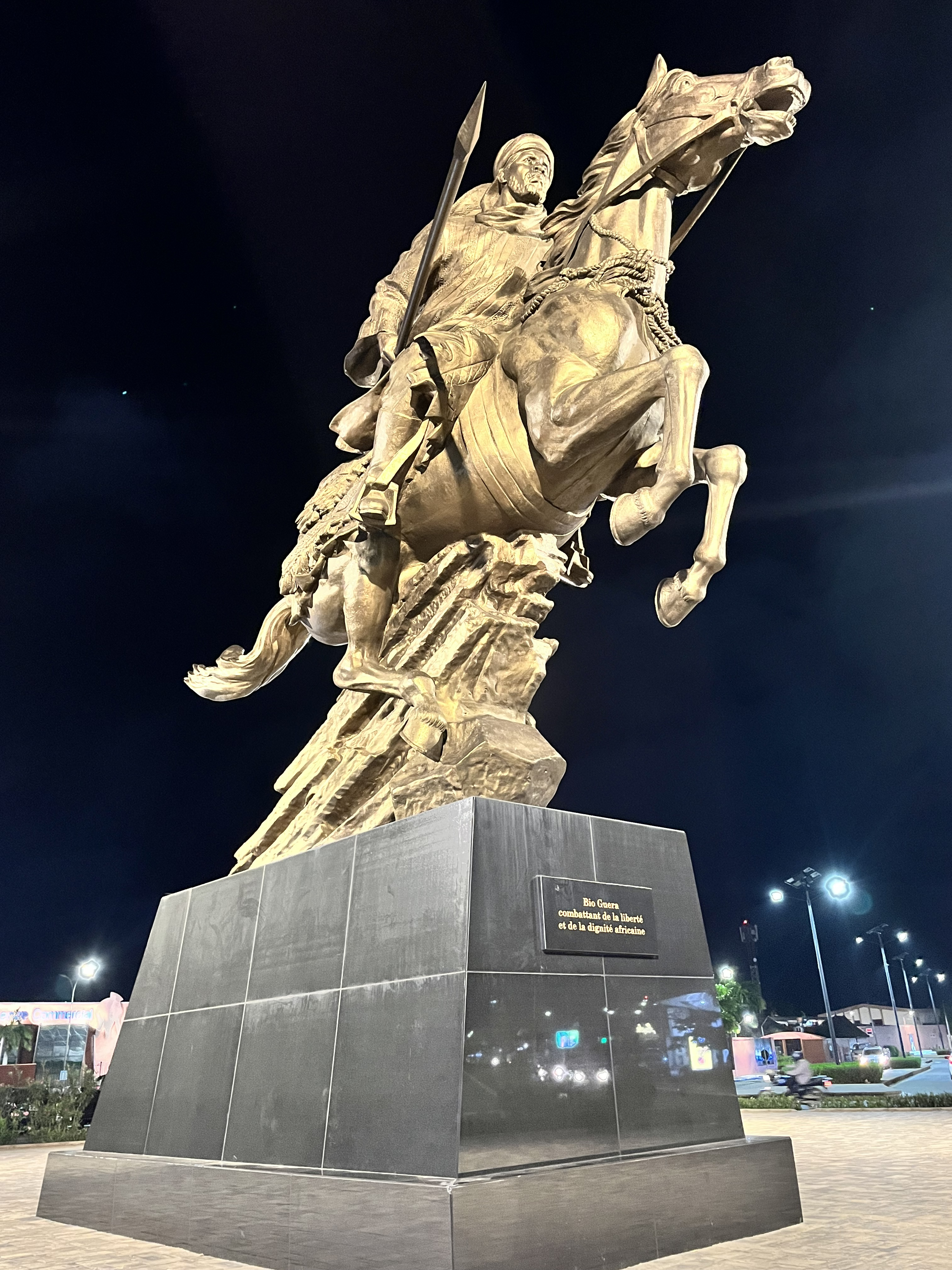
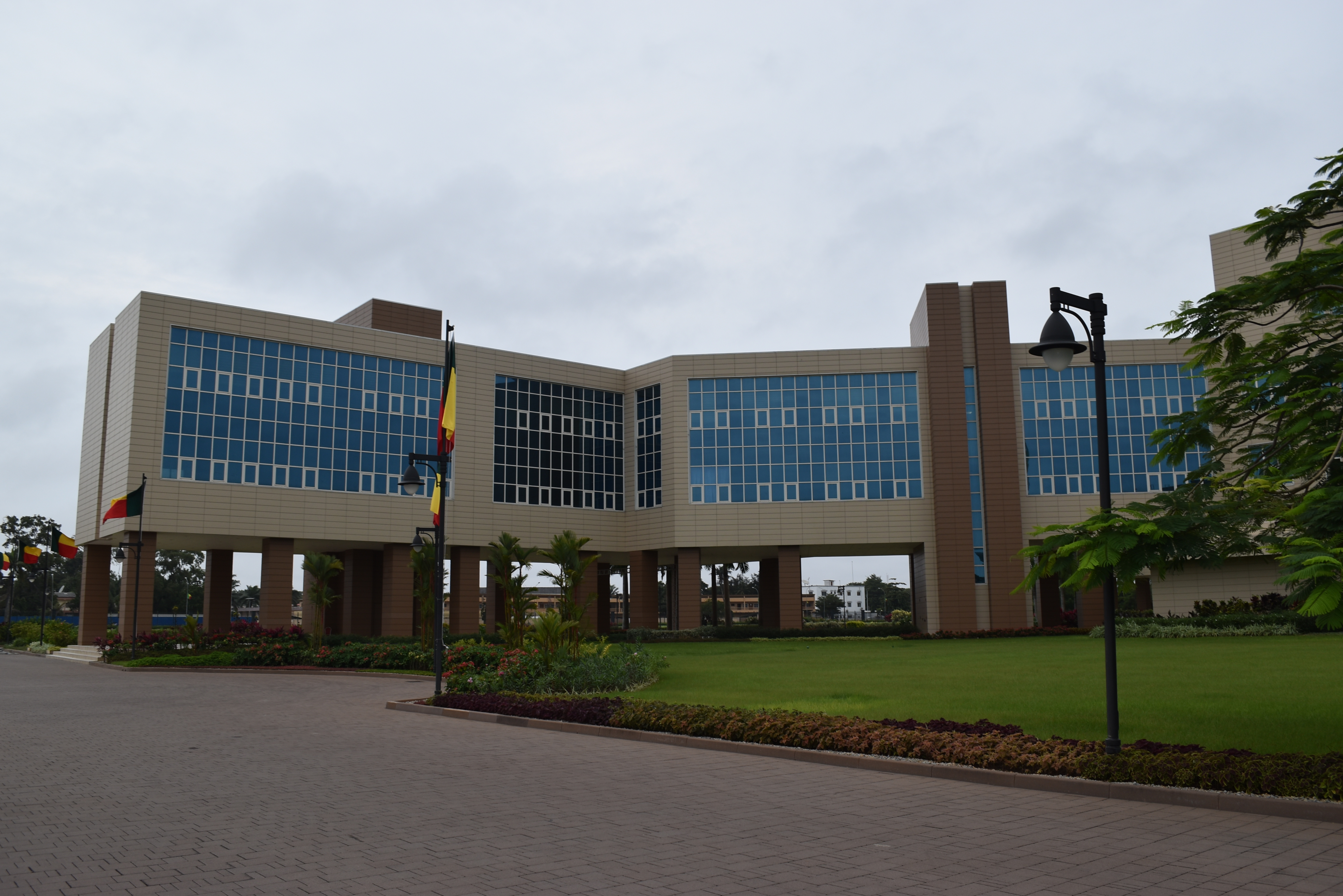
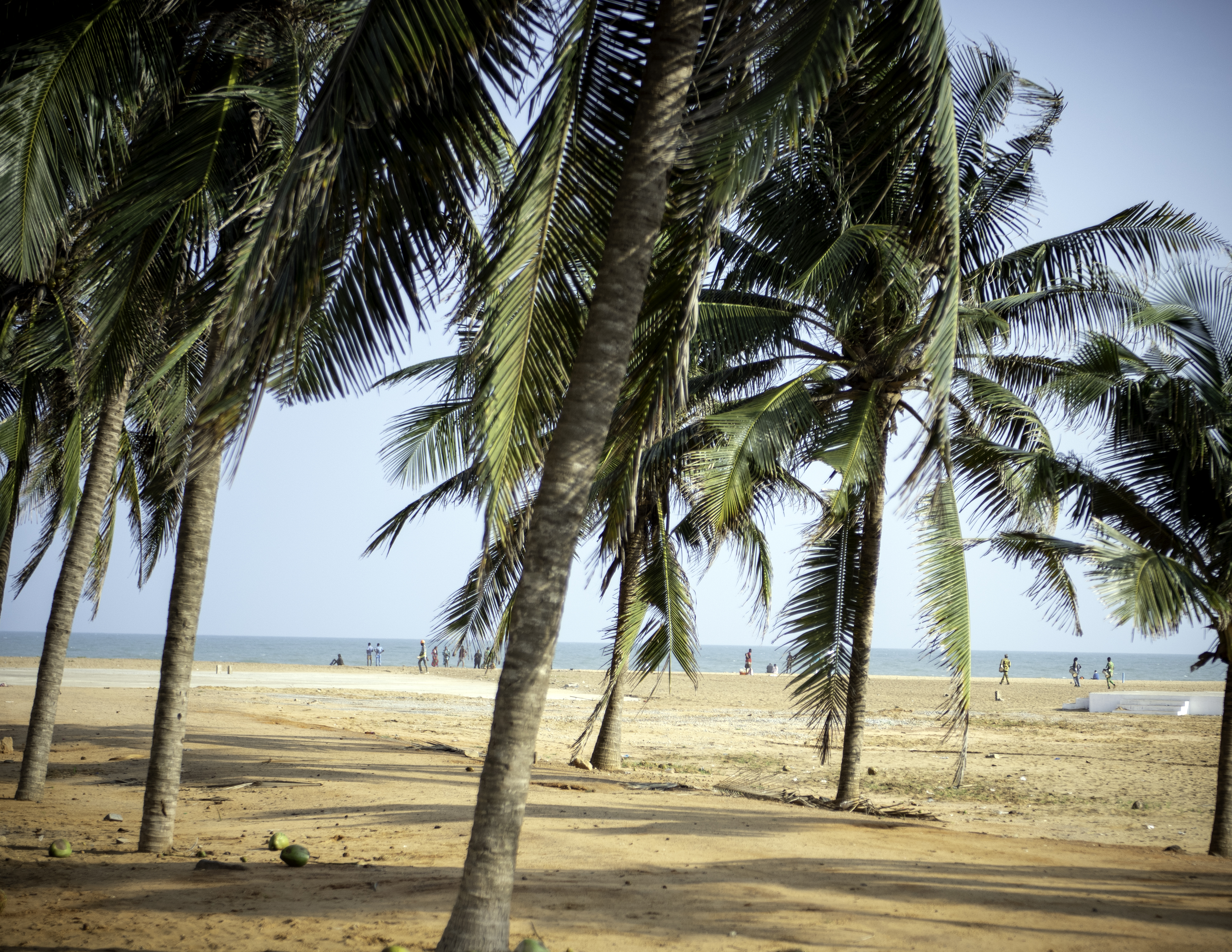
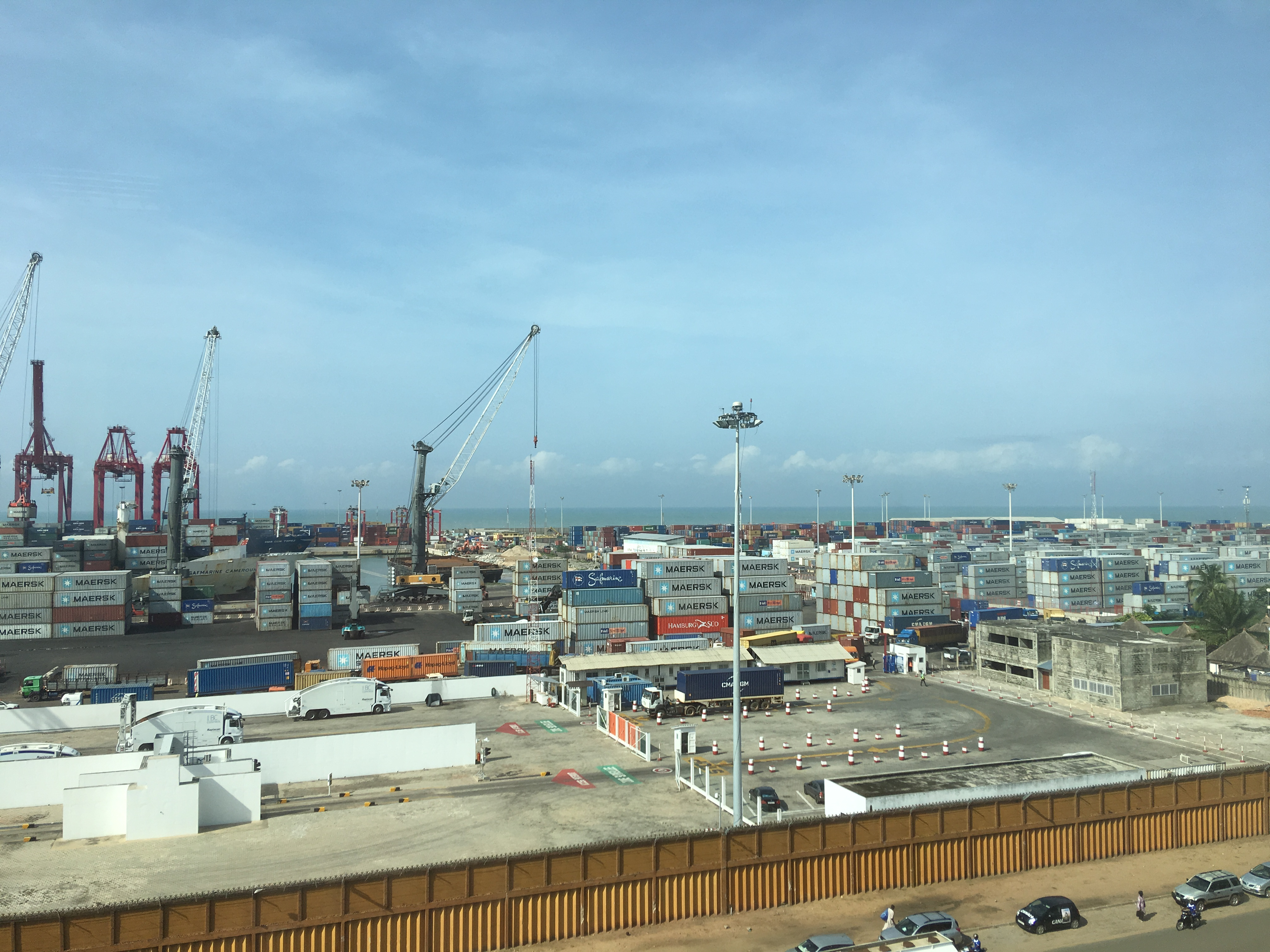
- Cotonou in 2019 Central Mosque of Cotonou Cotonou Cathedral Amazon Monument Monument de Bio Guéra Presidency of the Republic of Benin Beach of Cotonou Autonomous Port of Cotonou

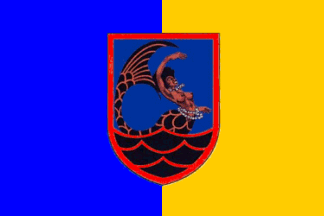
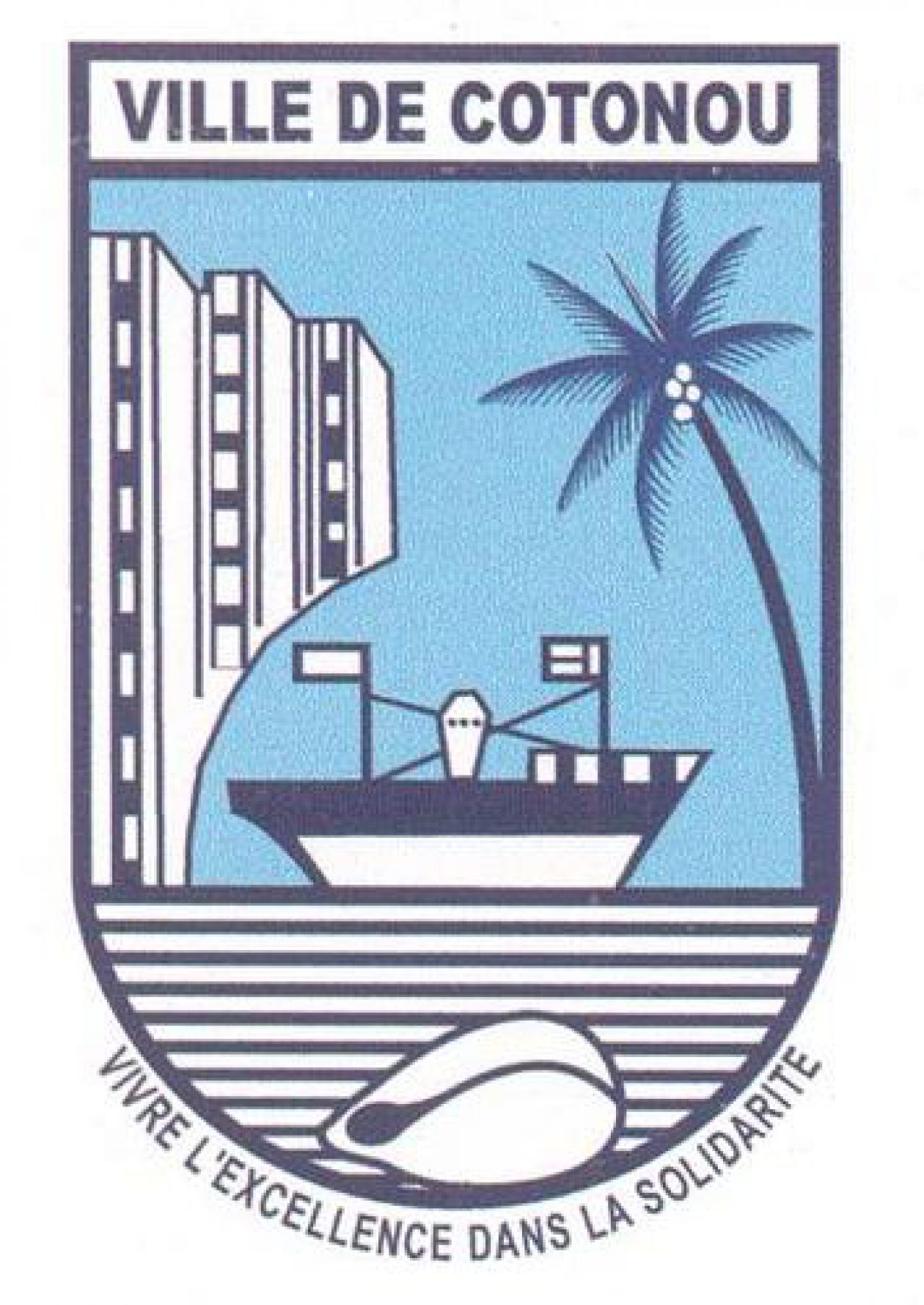
- Flag Coat of arms
- Interactive map of Cotonou
- Location within Benin Location within Africa
- Coordinates: 6°22′N 2°26′E
- Country: Benin
- Department: Littoral Department

Government
  - Mayor: Luc Atrokpo

Area
  - Total: 79 km^{2} (31 sq mi)
- Elevation: 51 m (167 ft)

Population (2013 census)
  - Total: 679,012
  - Rank: 1st
  - Density: 8,600/km^{2} (22,000/sq mi)
- Time zone: UTC+01:00 (WAT)

Cotonou (French pronunciation: [kɔtɔnu]; Fon: Kútɔ̀nú) is the seat of government and largest city of Benin. The official city proper population was 679,012 in 2012; however, over two million people live in the larger urban area. The urban area continues to expand, notably toward the west. The city lies in the southeast of the country, between the Atlantic Ocean and Lake Nokoué.

Cotonou is the seat of government of the Republic of Benin, where most of the government buildings are situated, government departments operate and foreign embassies are located, but the official capital, where the national legislature sits, is the smaller city of Porto-Novo.

== History ==
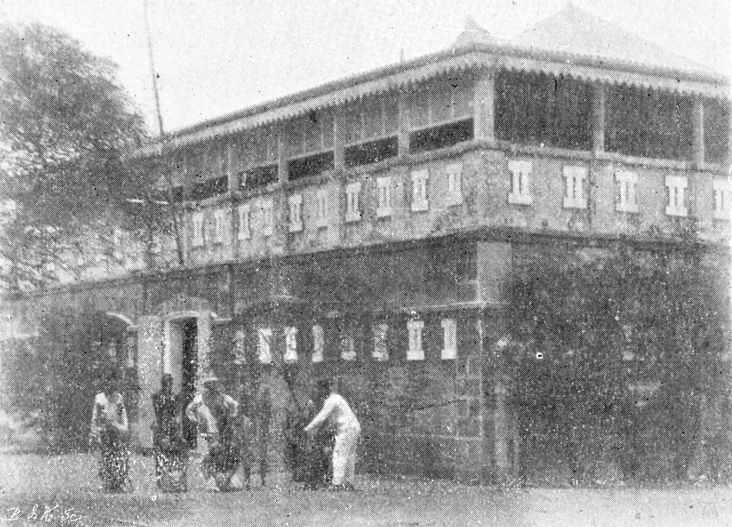
Fort of Cotonou in 1900

The name "Cotonou" means "by the river of death" in the Fon language. At the beginning of the 19th century, Cotonou (then spelled "Kutonou") was a small fishing village, and is thought to have been formally founded by King Ghezo of Dahomey in 1830. It grew as a centre for the slave trade, and later palm oil and cotton. In 1851 the French Second Republic made a treaty with King Ghezo that allowed them to establish a trading post at Cotonou. During the reign of King Glele (1858–89), the territory was ceded to the Second French Empire by a treaty signed in 1878. In 1883, the French Navy occupied the city to prevent British conquest of the area.

After Glele's death in 1889, King Béhanzin unsuccessfully tried to challenge the treaty. The town grew rapidly following the building of the harbour in 1908.

The population in 1960 was only 70,000.

== Geography ==
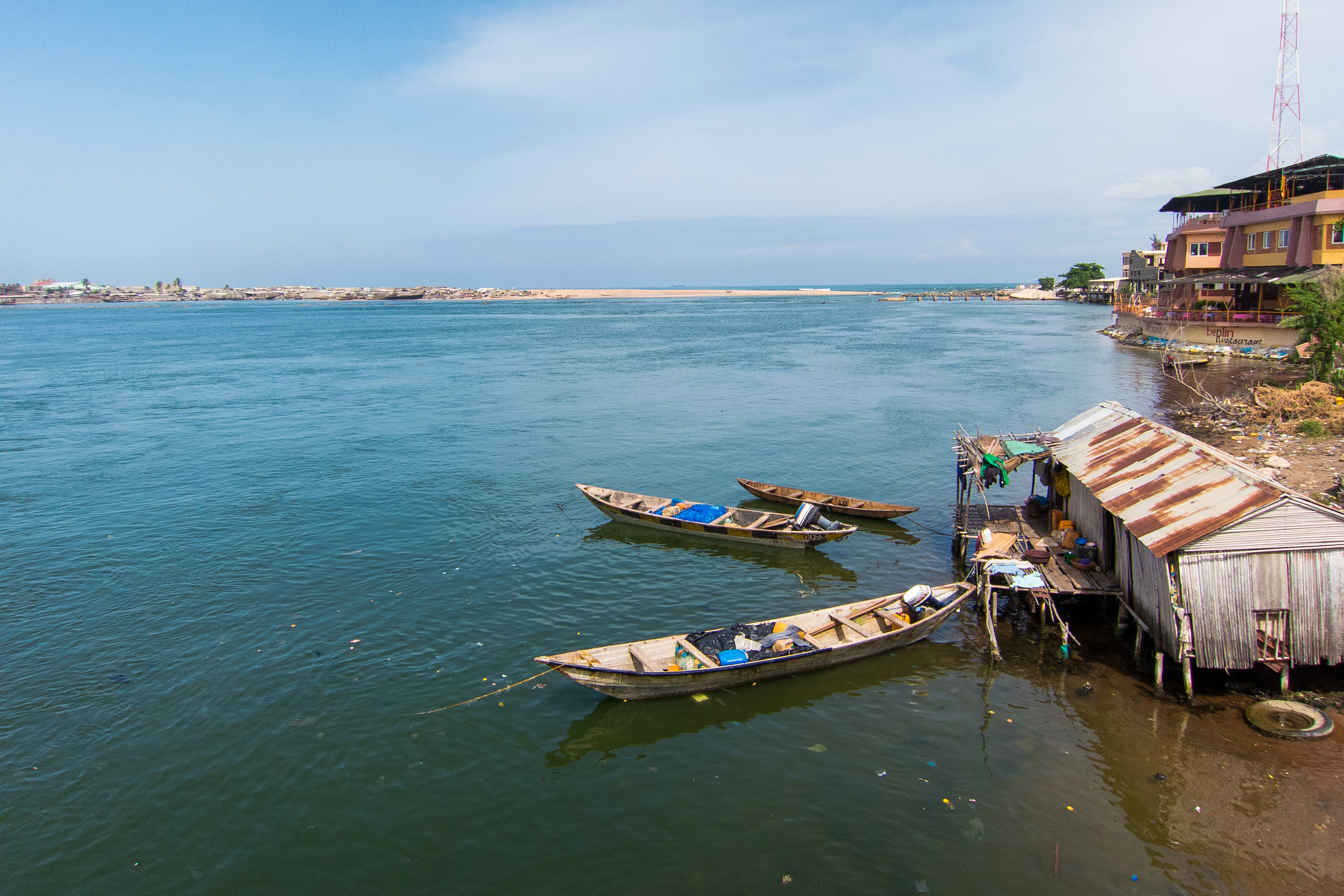
The Ouémé River as it flows into the Atlantic Ocean at Cotonou

Cotonou is on the coastal strip between Lake Nokoué and the Atlantic Ocean. The city is cut in two by a canal, the lagoon of Cotonou, dug by the French in 1855. Three bridges are in this area. The Ouémé River flows into the Atlantic Ocean at Cotonou.

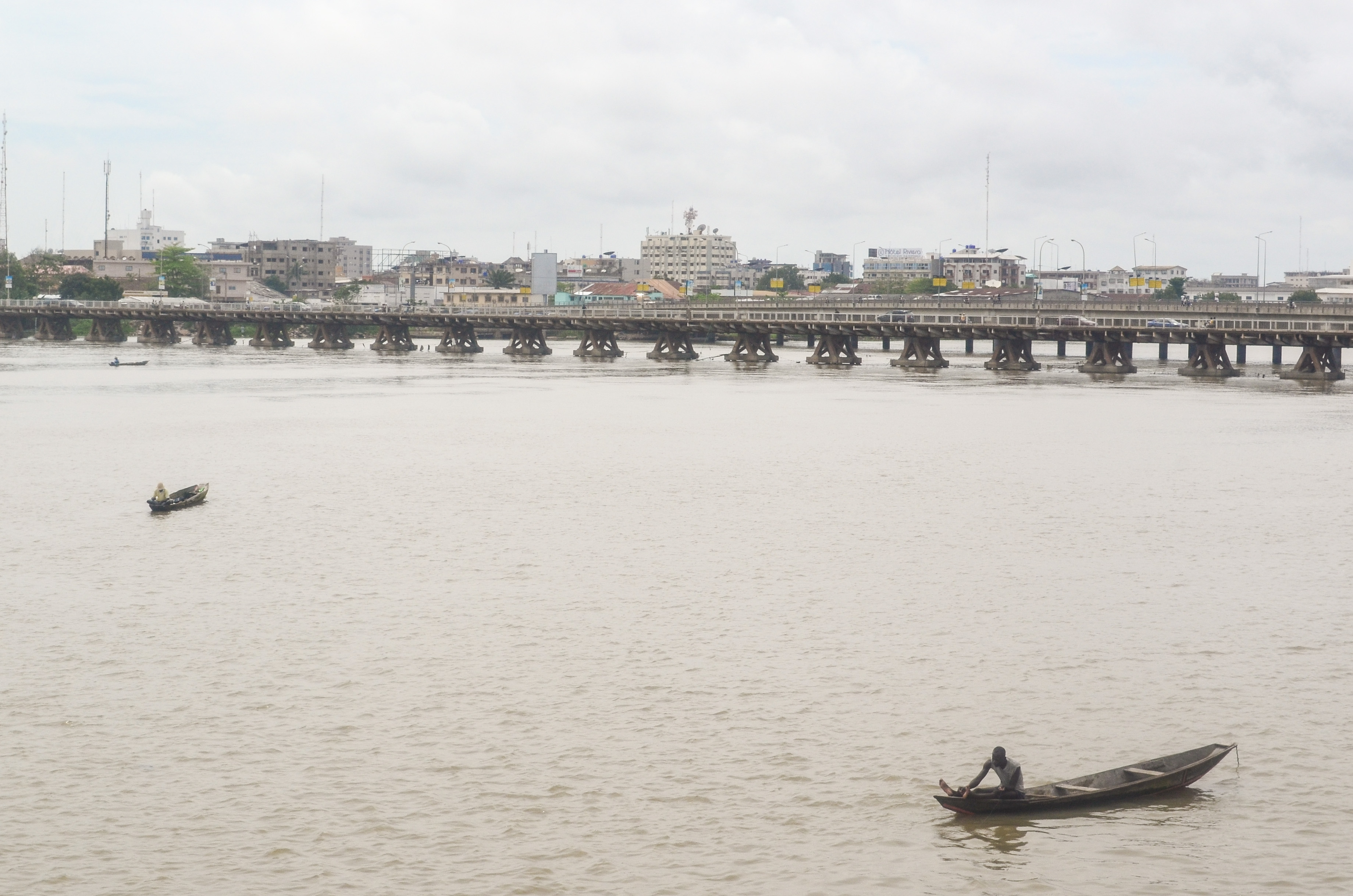
Bridge in Cotonou

The city has established transportation infrastructure including air, sea, river (to Porto-Novo), and land routes that facilitate trade with its neighbors Nigeria, Niger, Burkina Faso and Togo.

Coastal erosion has been noted for several decades. It worsened in 1961 following construction of the Nangbeto Dam and deep-water port of Cotonou. A pilot project funded by the United Nations Environment Program (UNEP) revealed that in 40 years, the coast to the east of Cotonou had retreated by 400 meters. This erosion has led many people to leave their homes along the coast.

== Climate ==
Under Köppen's climate classification, Cotonou features a tropical wet and dry climate (Aw), alternating with two rainy seasons (March–July and September–October, totalling 1,000 to 1,300 mm (39 to 51 in) of rain per year) and two dry seasons (August and November–February). In December and January, the city is affected by harmattan winds. Temperatures are relatively constant throughout the year, with the average high temperatures hovering around 30 °C (86 °F), and average low temperatures at around 25 °C (77 °F).

Climate data for Cotonou (1991–2020, extremes 1910–present)
Month	Jan	Feb	Mar	Apr	May	Jun	Jul	Aug	Sep	Oct	Nov	Dec	Year
Record high °C (°F)	36.1 (97.0)	38.6 (101.5)	36.0 (96.8)	35.4 (95.7)	39.0 (102.2)	33.0 (91.4)	33.5 (92.3)	31.8 (89.2)	31.6 (88.9)	33.4 (92.1)	35.4 (95.7)	36.6 (97.9)	39.0 (102.2)
Mean daily maximum °C (°F)	31.6 (88.9)	32.2 (90.0)	32.3 (90.1)	32.0 (89.6)	31.3 (88.3)	29.6 (85.3)	28.5 (83.3)	28.2 (82.8)	29.0 (84.2)	30.1 (86.2)	31.6 (88.9)	31.9 (89.4)	30.7 (87.3)
Daily mean °C (°F)	28.0 (82.4)	29.2 (84.6)	29.6 (85.3)	29.2 (84.6)	28.4 (83.1)	27.1 (80.8)	26.5 (79.7)	26.2 (79.2)	26.7 (80.1)	27.3 (81.1)	28.4 (83.1)	28.4 (83.1)	27.9 (82.2)
Mean daily minimum °C (°F)	24.4 (75.9)	26.0 (78.8)	26.8 (80.2)	26.3 (79.3)	25.4 (77.7)	24.5 (76.1)	24.4 (75.9)	24.1 (75.4)	24.3 (75.7)	24.5 (76.1)	25.3 (77.5)	24.9 (76.8)	25.1 (77.2)
Record low °C (°F)	17.0 (62.6)	17.9 (64.2)	18.5 (65.3)	20.7 (69.3)	19.6 (67.3)	20.0 (68.0)	18.8 (65.8)	19.8 (67.6)	20.0 (68.0)	19.1 (66.4)	21.0 (69.8)	17.9 (64.2)	17.0 (62.6)
Average precipitation mm (inches)	19.4 (0.76)	38.2 (1.50)	80.5 (3.17)	126.1 (4.96)	213.0 (8.39)	333.2 (13.12)	135.2 (5.32)	39.0 (1.54)	134.9 (5.31)	165.1 (6.50)	43.9 (1.73)	12.1 (0.48)	1,340.6 (52.78)
Average precipitation days (≥ 1.0 mm)	2	3	6	9	14	18	11	9	14	13	5	1	105
Average relative humidity (%)	75.5	77.3	78.2	79.8	81.3	84.1	84.2	83.7	83.8	83.1	80.6	77.9	80.8
Mean monthly sunshine hours	188.8	188.3	213.5	209.7	196.5	137.7	141.3	150.8	155.1	200.9	233.0	219.1	2,234.7
Source 1: NOAA
Source 2: Meteo Climat (record highs and lows)

== Demographics ==
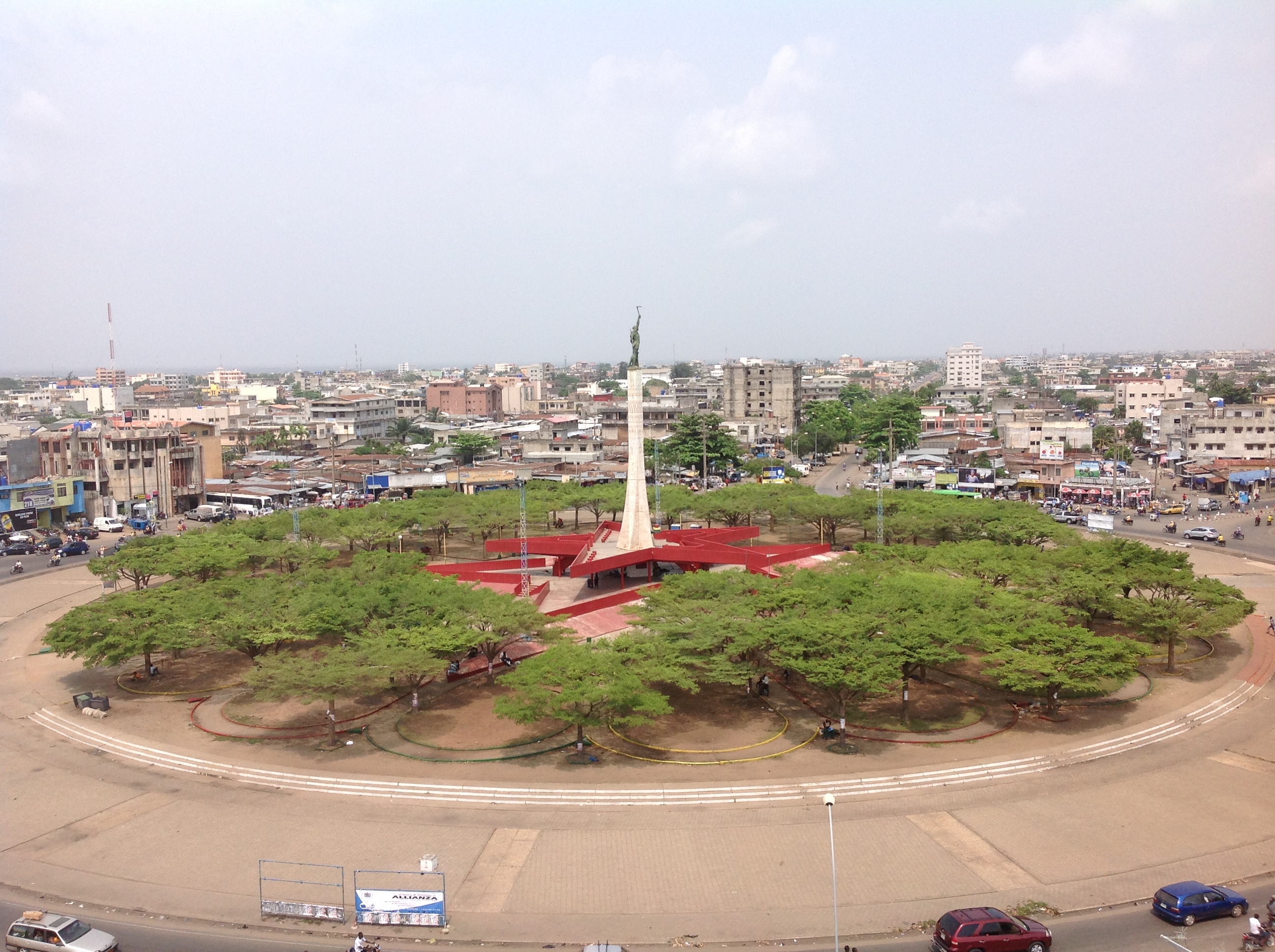
Red Star Square

- 1979: 320,348 (census count)
- 1992: 536,827 (census count)
- 2002: 665,100 (census count)
- 2013: 679,012 (census count)

French is the official language of Benin. Other languages spoken in Cotonou include Fon, Aja and Yoruba.

== Transport ==
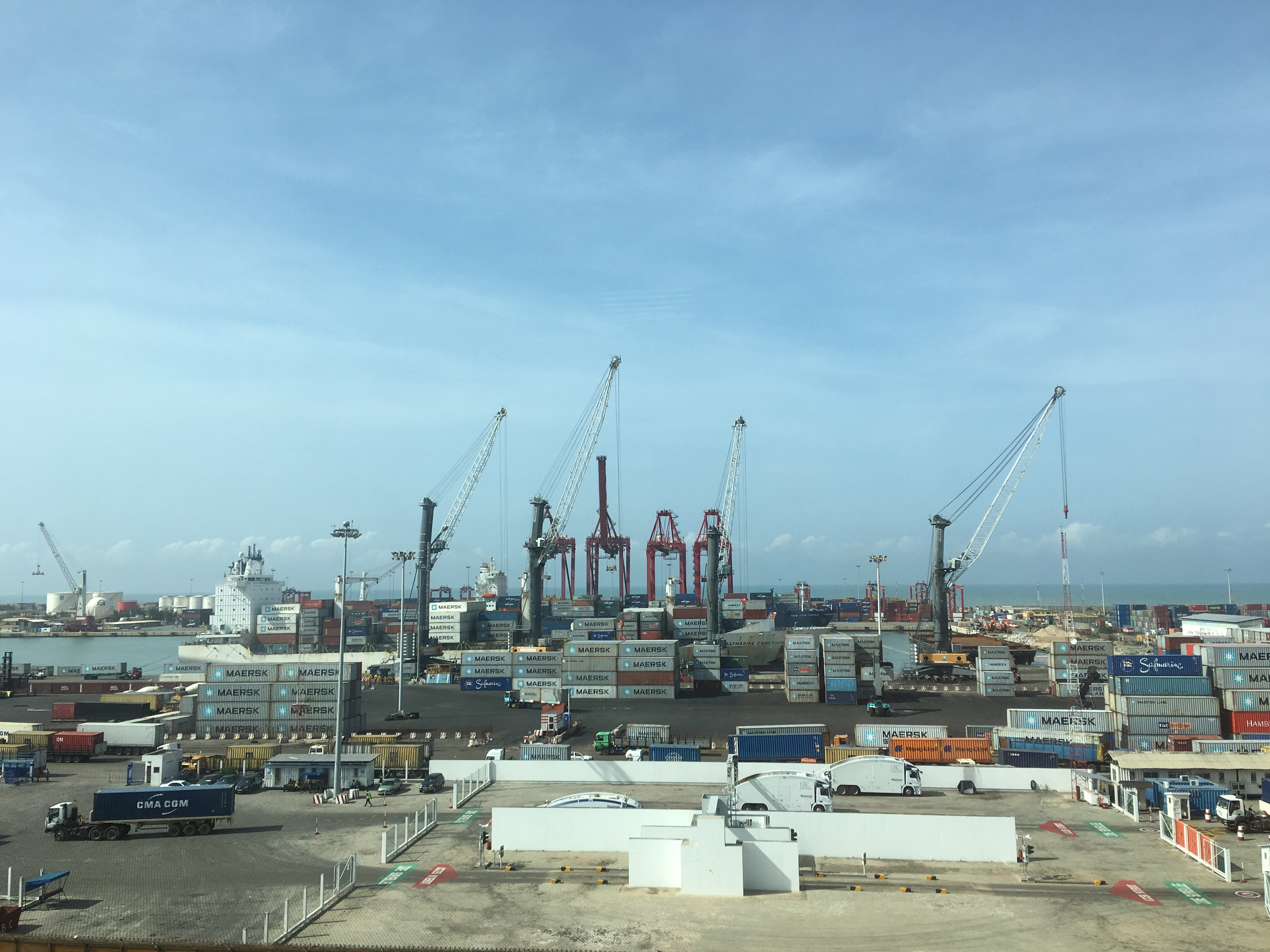
Autonomous Port of Cotonou

The Autonomous Port of Cotonou is one of the largest in West Africa. The city is connected to Parakou in the north by the Benin-Niger railway. Cotonou International Airport provides service to the capitals of the region and to France, as well as the major cities of Benin: Parakou, Kandi, Natitingou, Djougou, and Savé. There are road connections to neighboring countries: Nigeria, Burkina Faso, Niger, and Togo. A prevalent mode of transport in the city is the motorcycle-taxi, known locally as zémidjan.

In 2015 a suburban passenger railway line was being developed between Cotonou and Pahou.

== Economy ==
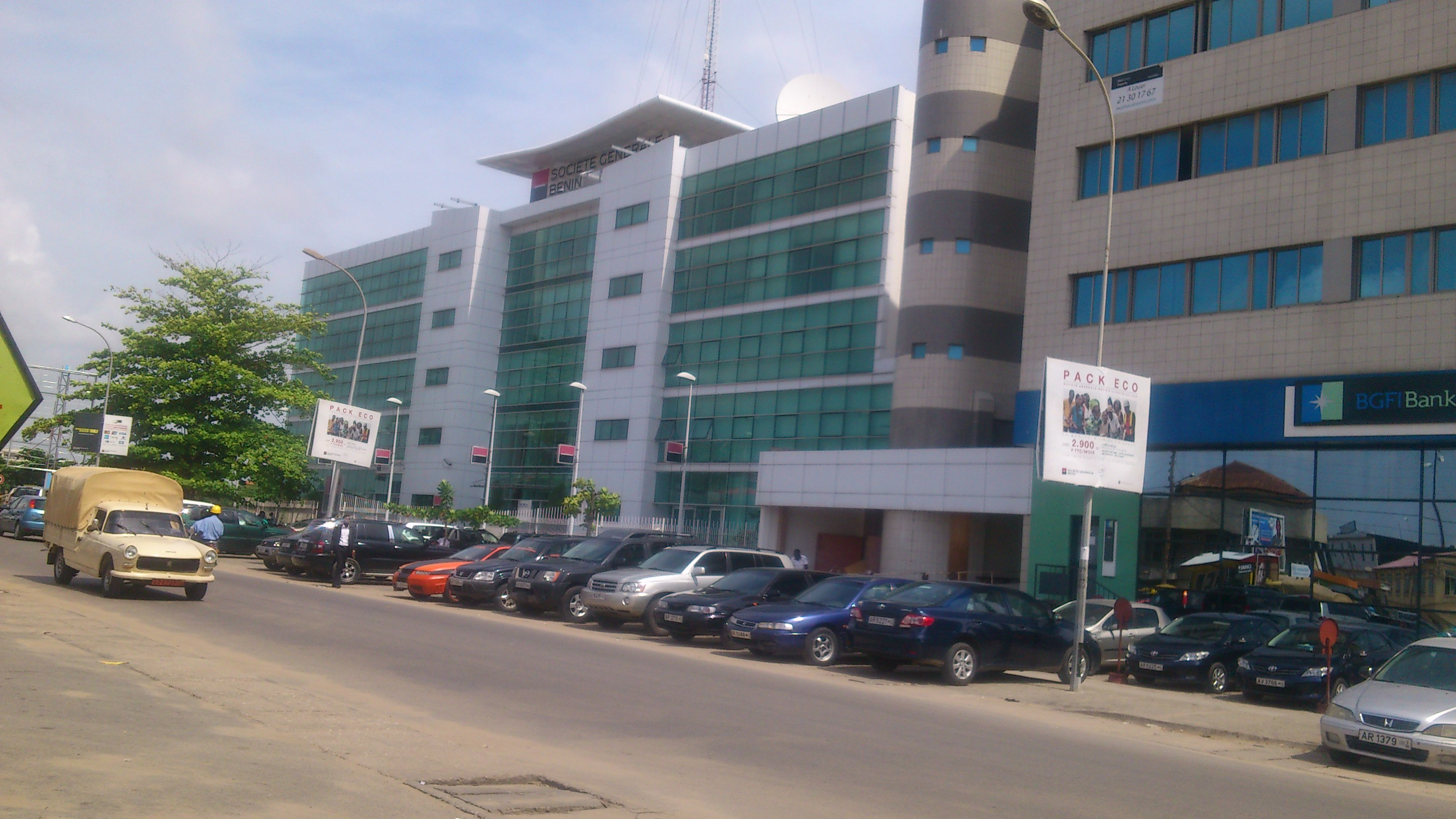
Downtown of Cotonou

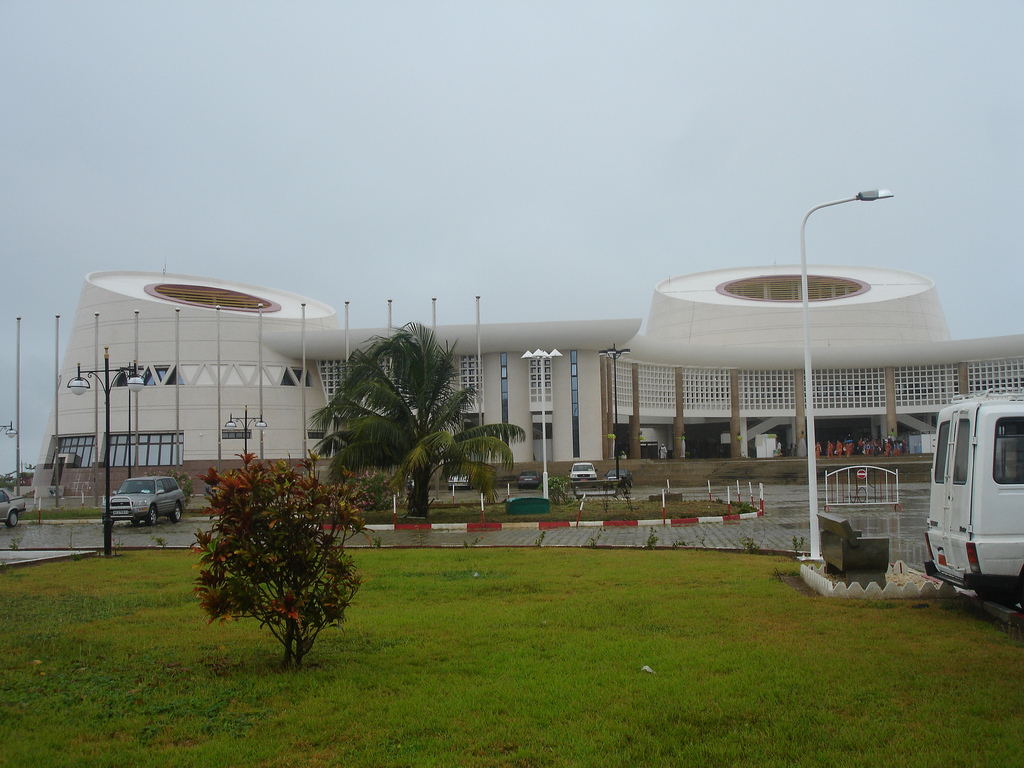
Congress Palace of Cotonou

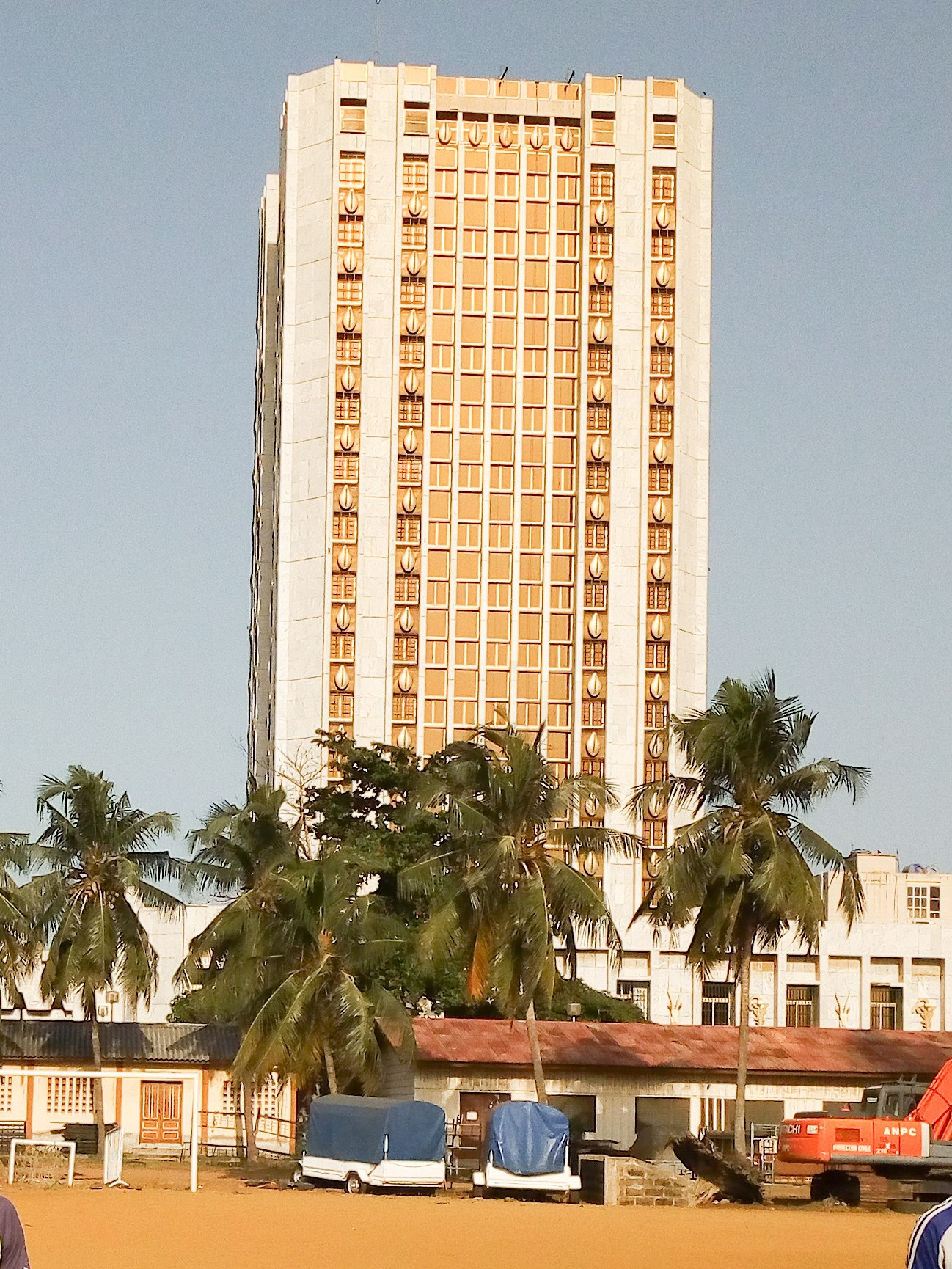
BCEAO Tower Cotonou

Important manufactured goods include palm oil, brewing, textiles, and cement. Motor vehicles and bicycles are assembled, and there are sawmills in the city. Petroleum products, bauxite, and iron are major exports. There are offshore platforms drilling for oil. The city is a centre for the automotive trade, with European brands being sold from vast open-air parking lots. In the past, Citroën assembled cars (for instance, the Citroën 2CV and Ami 8) locally.

By 2012, piracy in the Gulf of Guinea had significantly decreased trade at the port of Cotonou.

In the Missèbo area is a textile market of African prints mainly handled by Indian wholesalers and retailers.

The 12th arrondissement, between Boulevard de la Marina and the Atlantic Ocean, is the site of the second tallest statue in Africa, honoring the Dahomey Amazons.

== Places of worship ==
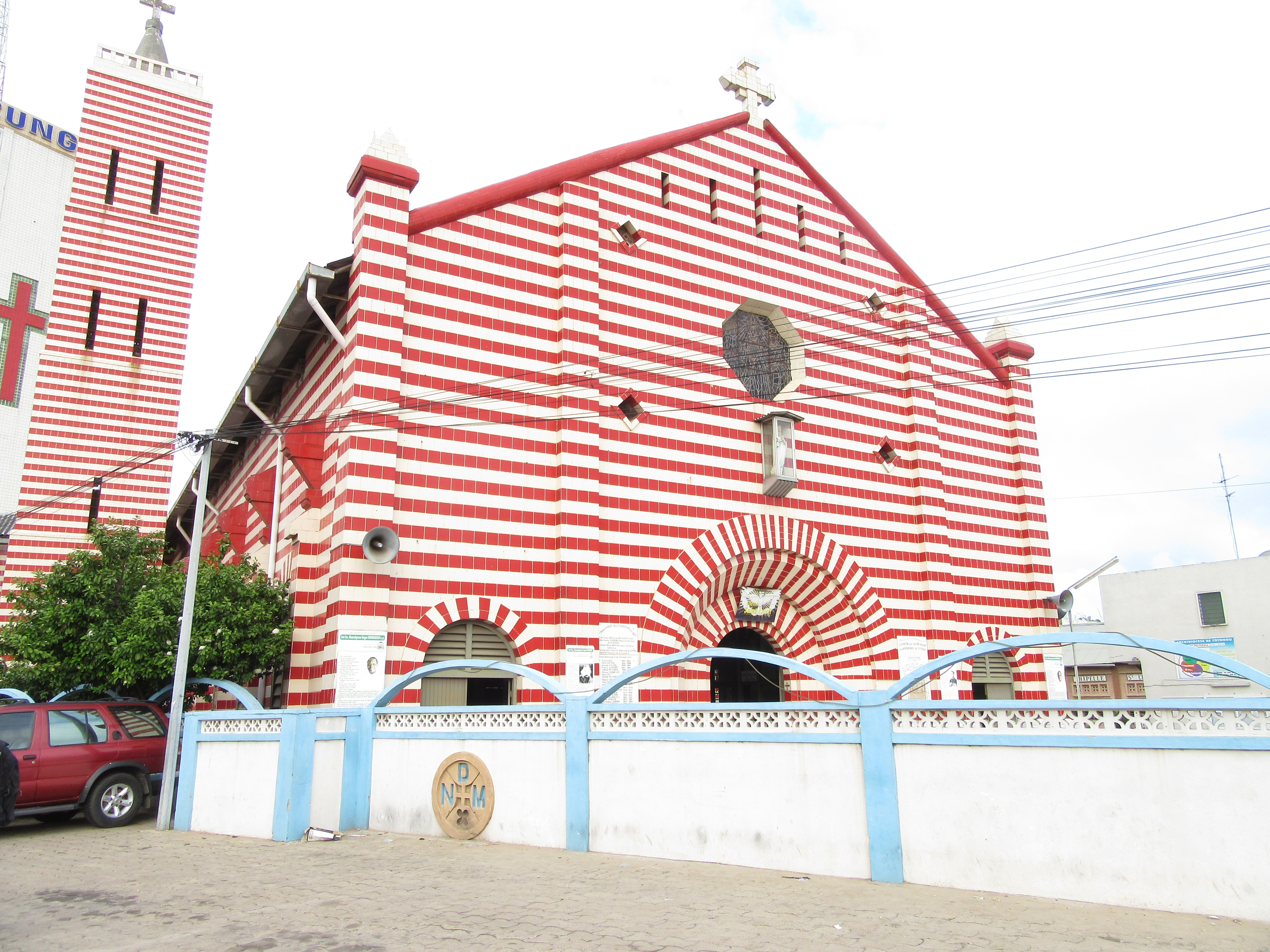
Cotonou Cathedral (Catholicism)

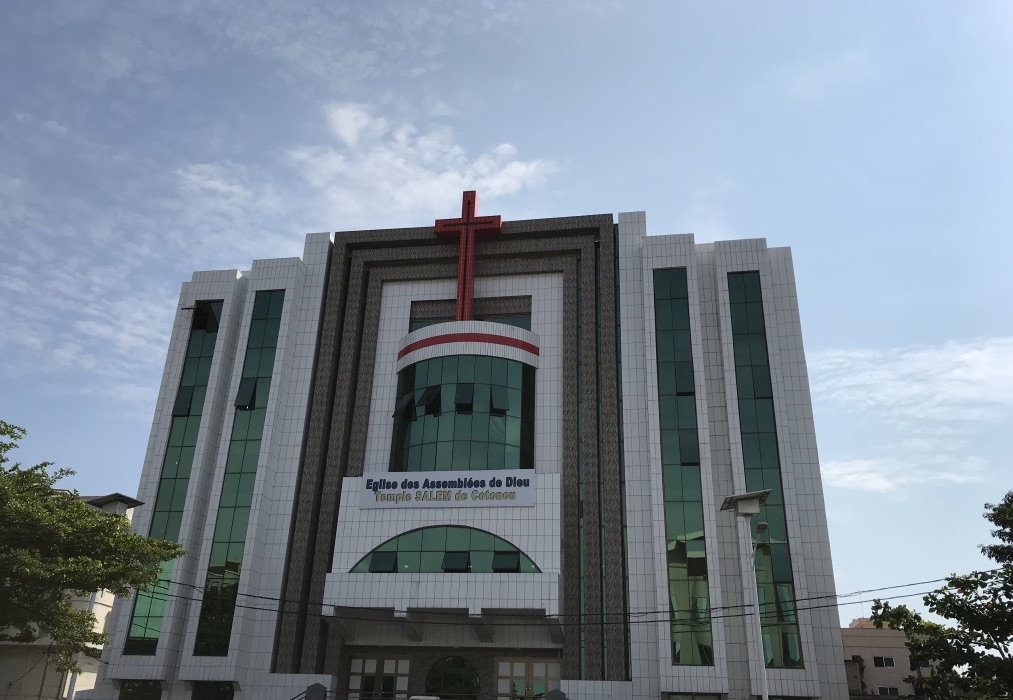
Temple Salem de Cotonou (Assemblies of God)

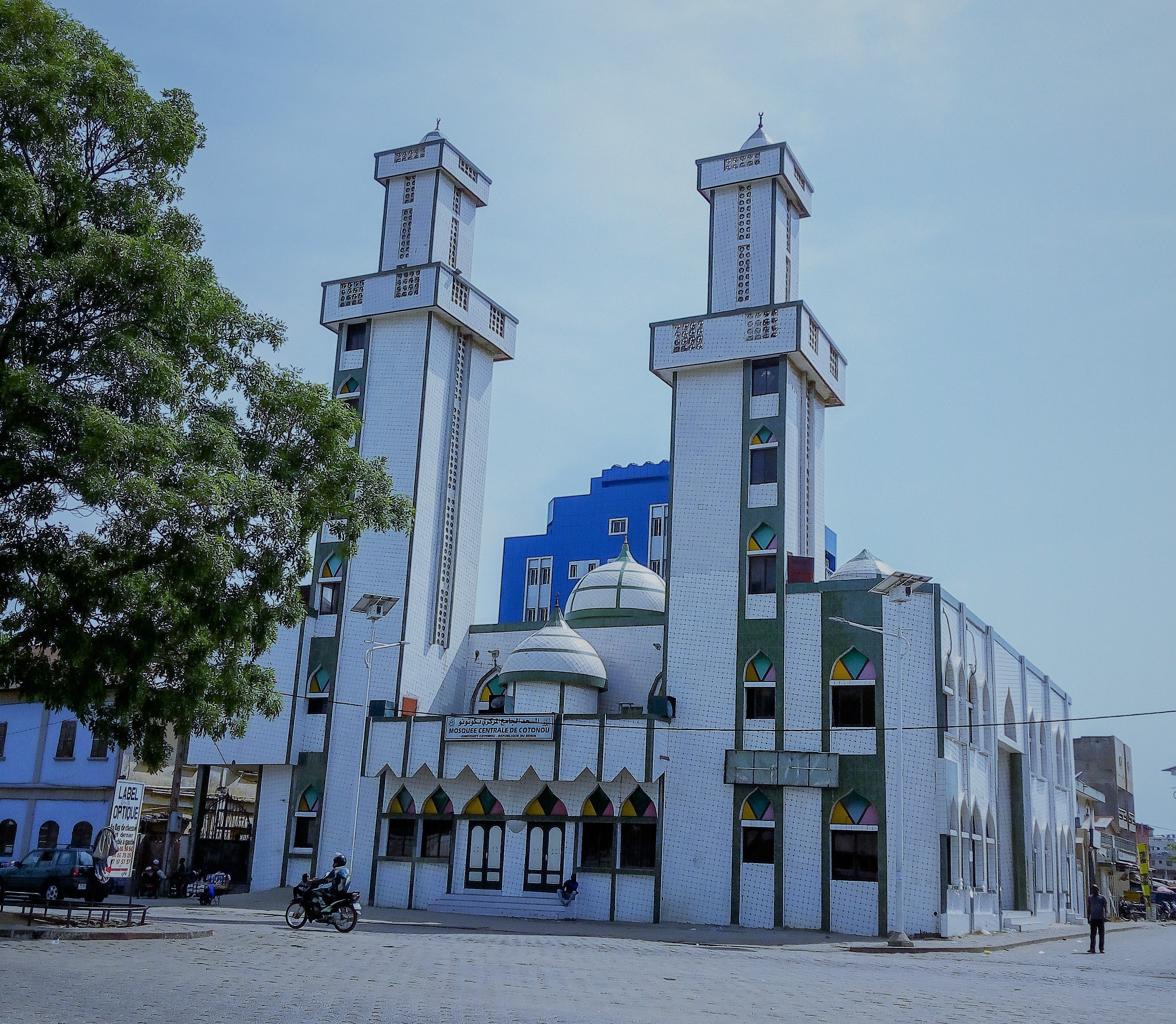
Mosquée centrale de Cotonou (Islam)

Among the places of worship, Christian churches are predominant: Roman Catholic Archdiocese of Cotonou (Catholic Church), Protestant Methodist Church in Benin (World Methodist Council), Union of Baptist Churches of Benin (Baptist World Alliance), Living Faith Church Worldwide, Redeemed Christian Church of God, Assemblies of God. There are also mosques.

== Education ==
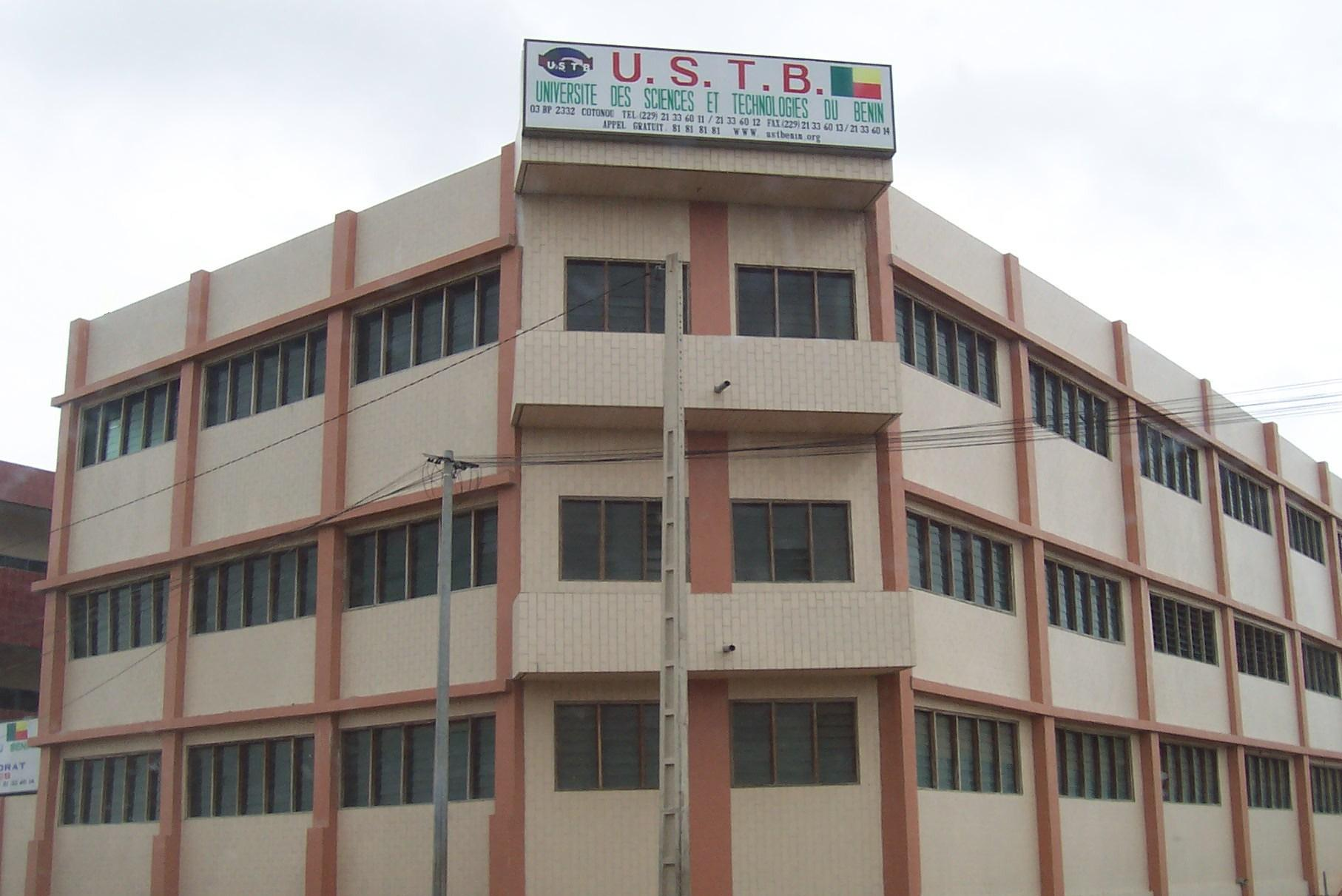
Benin University of Science and Technology

The city has a campus of the:

- University of Science and Technology of Benin (Université des sciences et technologies du Bénin)
- African University of Technology and Management (Université africaine de technologie et de management).

Cotonou is a home to African University Institute Foundation (AUi Foundation) one of the biggest educational philanthropic foundations in Africa.

It also hosts some of the most prestigious private universities in Africa which includes:

- African University of Benin(AUB)
- Ecole Superieure de Gestion de Technologie (ESGT UNIVERSITY BENIN)
- Ecole Supérieure D'Administration, D'Economie, De Journalisme Et Des Métiers De L'Audiovisuel (ESAE UNIVERSITY BENIN)
- Institut Superieur de Communication d'Organisation et de Management
- Iscom University Benin

== Media ==
The Office de Radiodiffusion et Télévision du Bénin (ORTB) — the national television and radio operator — is based in Cotonou.

== Notable people ==
- Agnès Adjaho, Beninese ambassador to Vatican City
- Djimon Hounsou, born in Cotonou, Beninese American actor

== Sister cities and twin towns ==
- Atlanta, United States
- Salvador da Bahia, Brazil
- Taipei City, Taiwan, since 1967

== See also ==
- Timeline of Cotonou
- Cotonou Agreement
- List of deep water ports
- Railway stations in Benin
