= Nangbeto Dam =

Dam in Plateaux Region, Togo

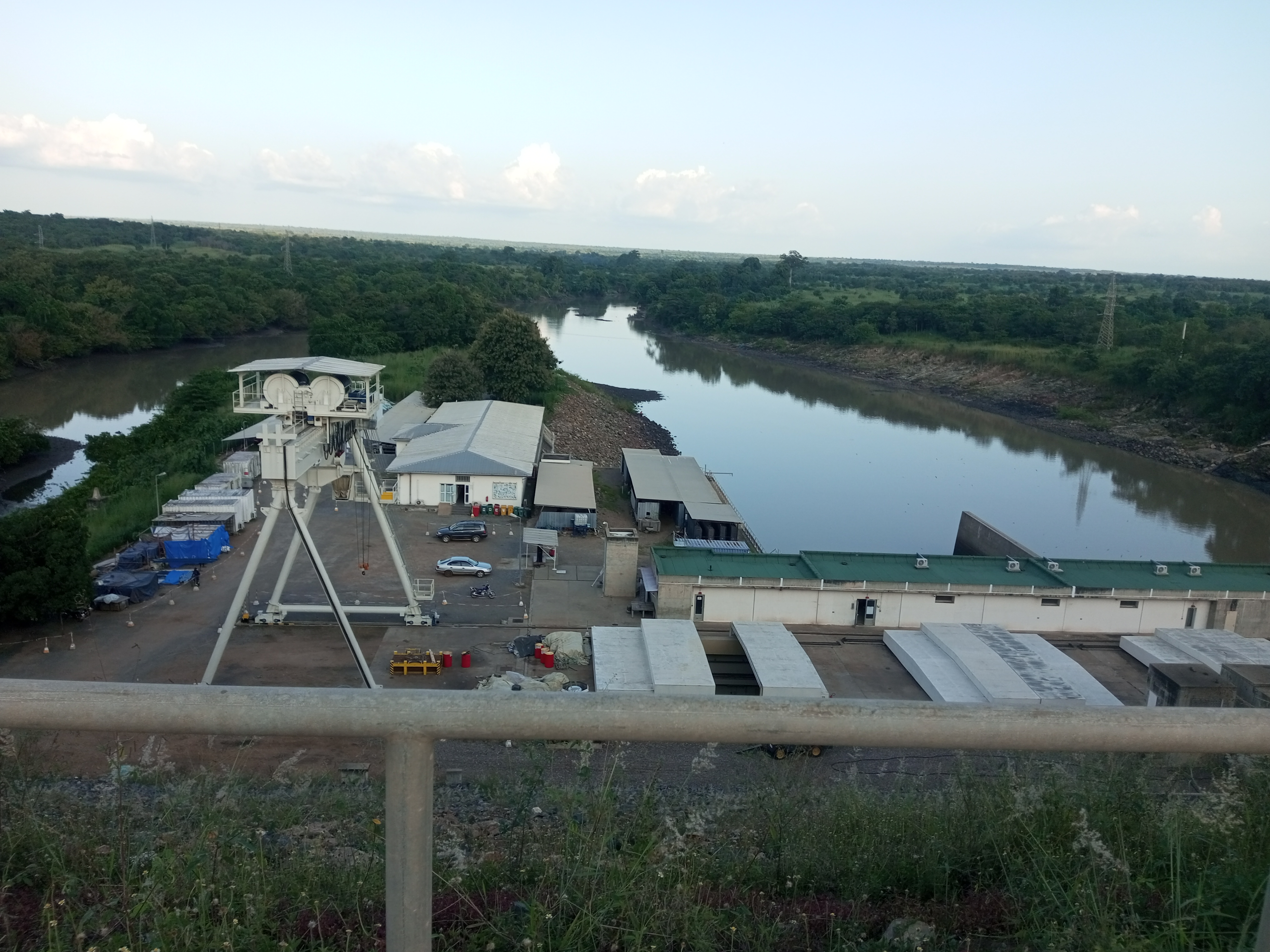

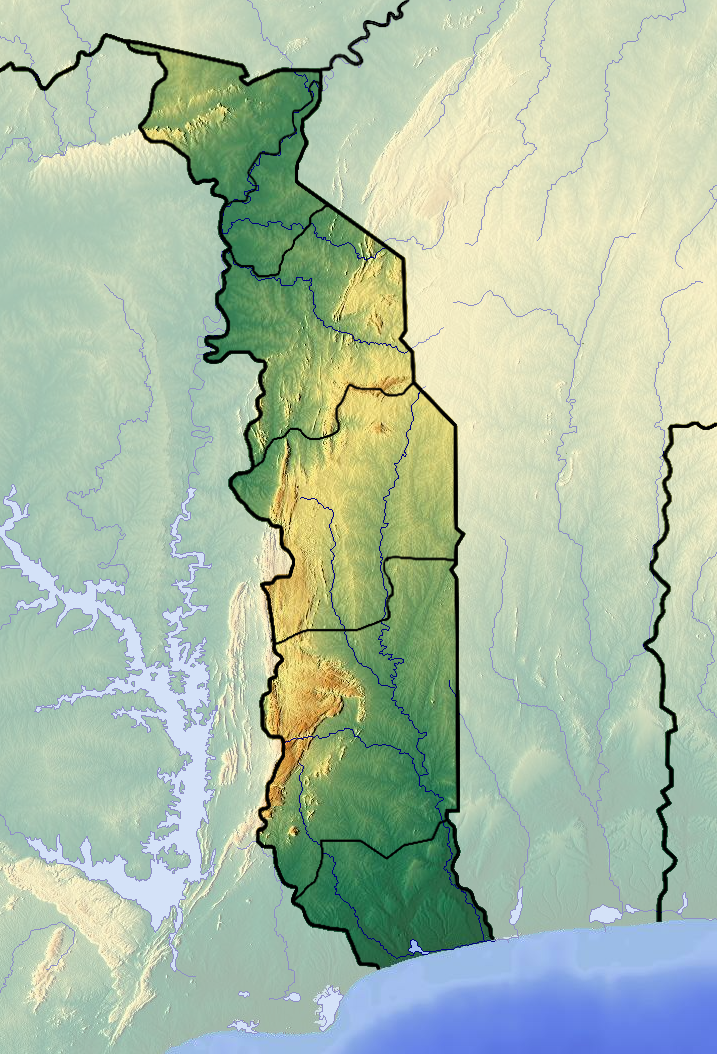
- Location within Togo
- Country: Togo
- Location: Plateaux Region
- Coordinates: 7°25′25.40″N 1°26′5.82″E
- Purpose: Power, irrigation, fisheries
- Status: Operational
- Construction began: 1984
- Opening date: 1987
- Construction cost: US$98.22 million

Dam and spillways
- Height: 52 m (171 ft)
- Length: 443 m (1,453 ft)

Reservoir
- Total capacity: 1,710×10^{6} m^{3} (1,390,000 acre⋅ft)

Power Station
- Commission date: 1987
- Turbines: 2 x 32.8 MW (44,000 hp) Kaplan-type
- Installed capacity: 65.6 MW (88,000 hp)

The Nangbeto Dam is an embankment dam on the Mono River in the Plateaux Region of Togo. It was constructed between 1984 and 1987 for the purpose of providing hydroelectric power to both Togo and Benin as well as creating fisheries and supplying water for irrigation. The dam's 65.6 megawatts (88,000 hp) power station was commissioned in June 1987. The project was financed by the World Bank and African Development Bank at a cost of US$98.22 million.

The objectives of the dam were to satisfy the medium-term requirements of Benin and Togo for power, and to provide a large water reserve, amounting to 1.7 billion cubic metres. It was expected that 1000 to 1500 tonnes of fish would be produced each year and that 43,000 hectares of land would be irrigated. Evaluation of the project six years later showed that the project had been completed on time and on budget to a satisfactory standard. The project was a good example of cooperation between the two countries. The power generation objective was satisfied but the fish development scheme had failed and the irrigation project was proceeding at a slower rate than expected. However, initial results of the cultivation of rice on the irrigated land were encouraging.

The Nangbeto Dam serves part of Togo's needs for electricity and is subject to interruptions in supply when the water level is low, which may happen for periods of several months. As a result, a further dam on the Mono River further downstream at Adjaralla is being constructed, starting in 2016. The fish production scheme involved in this project and other environmental issues are being planned at an earlier stage in its development.

== Rehabilitation ==
In 2017, Communauté Electrique du Bénin, the electric grid operator in Togo and Benin advertised for a company to undertake the rehabilitation of this power station which had not undergone any major overhaul since commercial commissioning in 1987.

Voith Hydro, a German manufacturer and installer of hydromechanical and electricity hardware was selected to rehabilitate and modernize the two 32.5 megawatt turbines. The contractor will work on one generator at a time, in order to maintain output from the turbine that is not under repair/rehabilitation. The work expected to last until the fourth quarter of 2022, cost US$25 million.
