= Ancien Pont =

Bridge in Cotonou, Benin

Coordinates: 6°21′32.0″N 2°26′30.3″E

The Ancien Pont is a bridge in Cotonou, Benin. The bridge crosses the Lagune de Cotonou which separates the two sides of the city. It was built in 1928 and renovated in 1981.

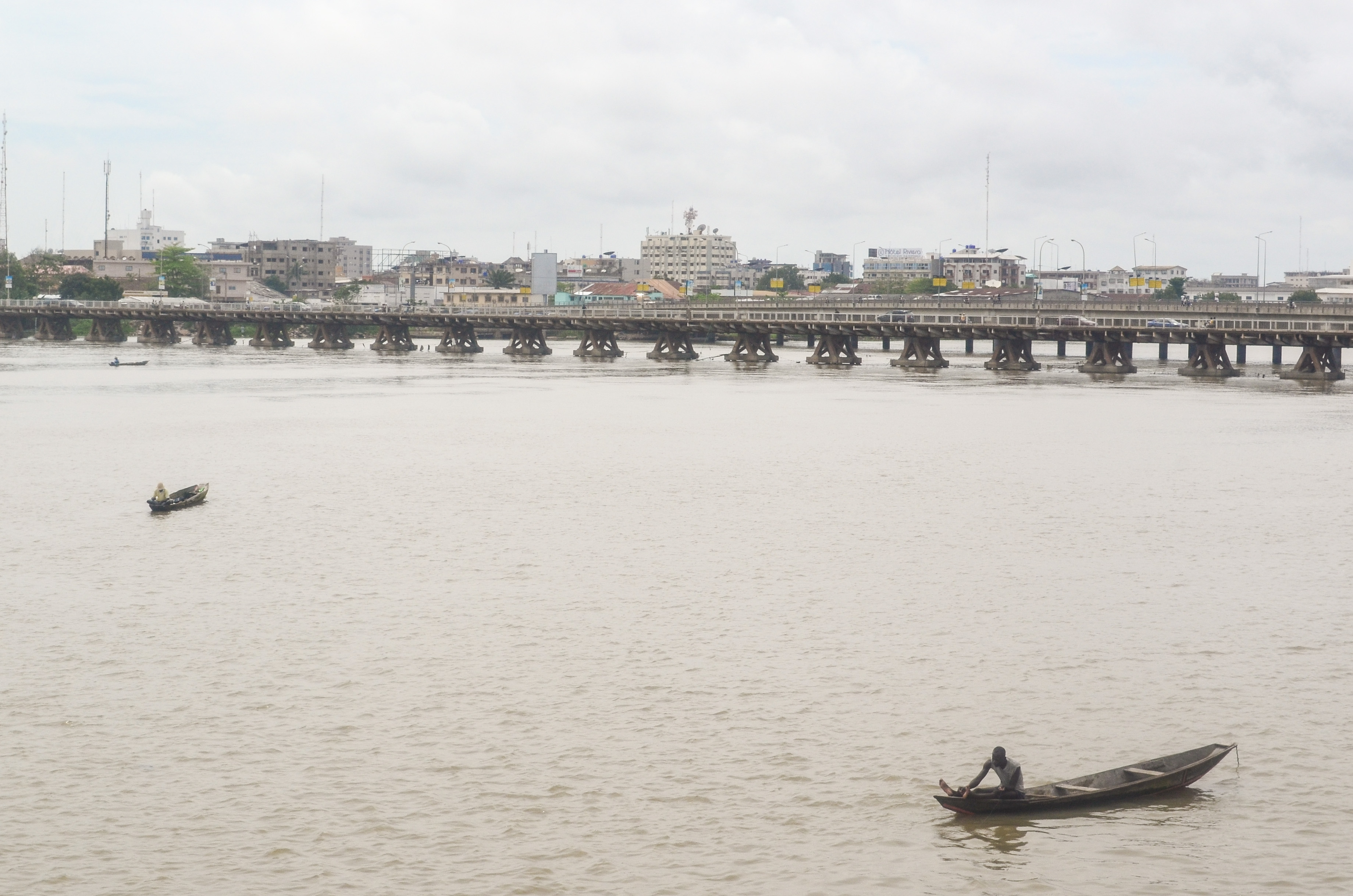
Ancien Pont Bridge

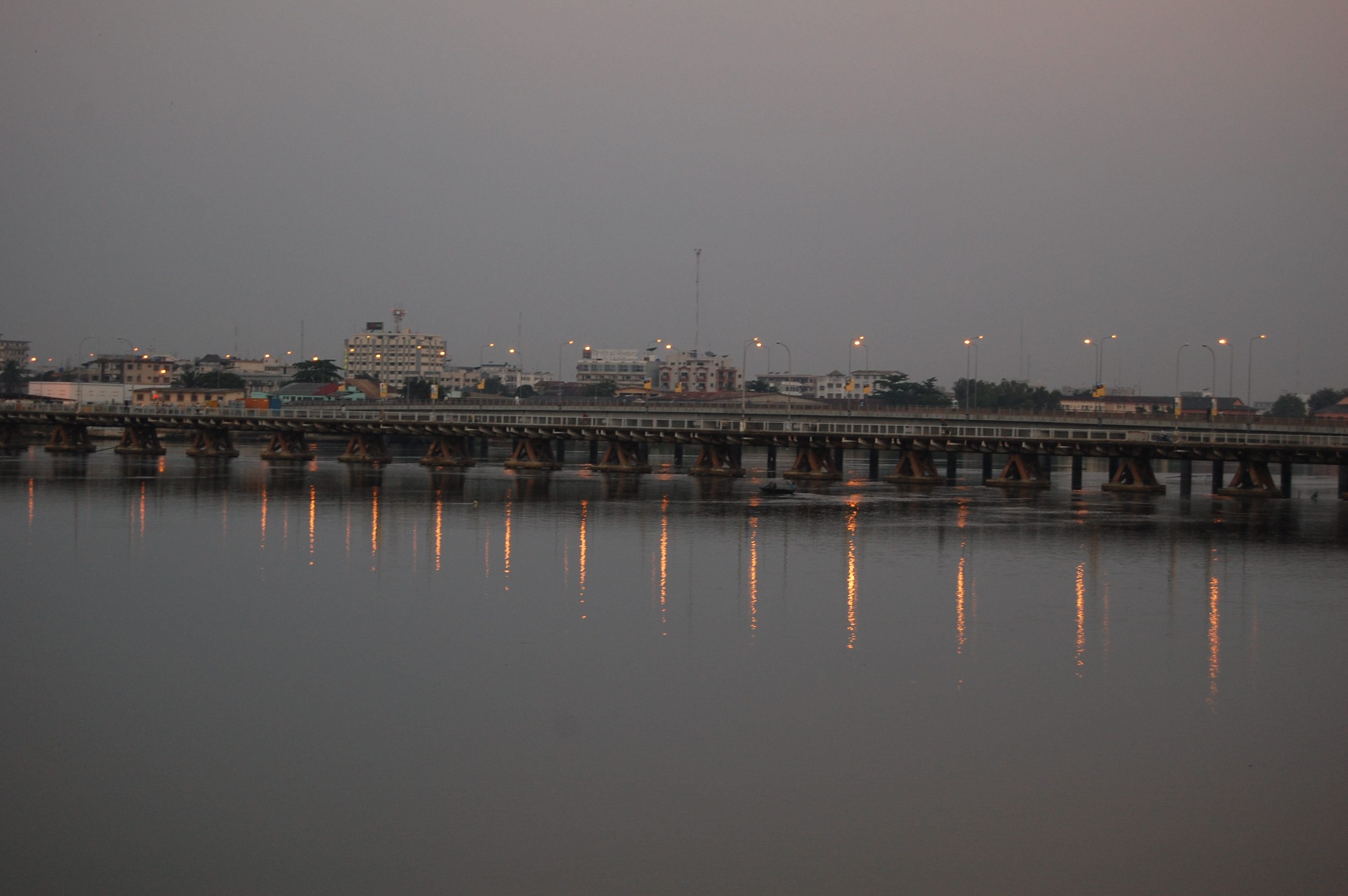
The bridge at dusk

== History ==
Known as the “old bridge,” it is the first bridge in the city of Cotonou and the closest to the ocean. Built between 1927 and 1930, it spans the Kouta Canal, connecting the two banks of the lagoon—specifically, the port to the west and the industrial area near the former village of Akpakpa to the east. However, the Akpakpa district would only truly become accessible with the construction of a second bridge and restoration work on the first one.

In 1970, more than 2,000 vehicles, along with hundreds of cyclists and pedestrians, crossed it daily. By 1995, two-wheelers made up 67% of the vehicles using the bridge.

In 2018, social media shared concerns from citizens warning about the advanced state of deterioration of the bridge, particularly due to exposure to sea spray. The government offered reassurance and announced a new rehabilitation project for the bridge, the previous renovation having taken place in 1980.
