= Outline of Benin =

Country in West Africa

The Flag of Benin

The Coat of arms of Benin

The location of Benin

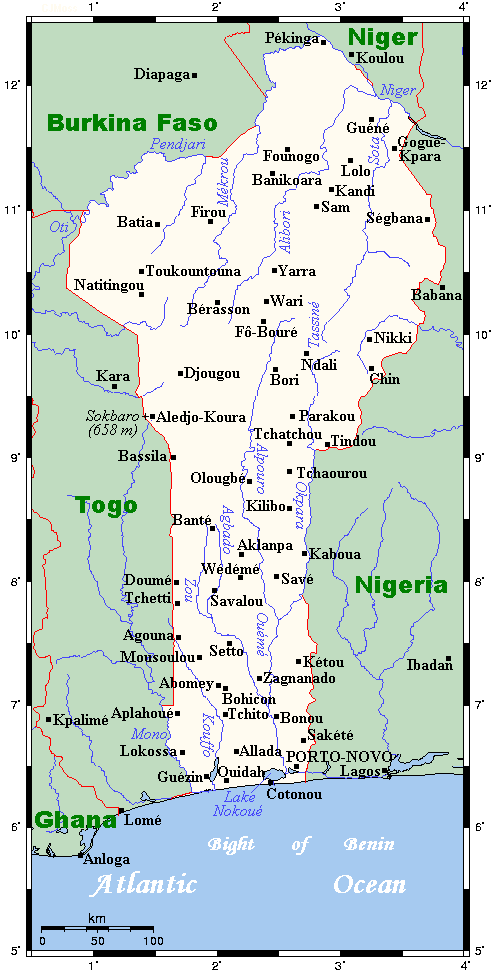
An enlargeable map of Benin

The following outline is provided as an overview of and topical guide to Benin:

Benin – country in West Africa. It borders Togo to the west, Nigeria to the east and Burkina Faso and Niger to the north; its short coastline to the south leads to the Bight of Benin. Its capital is Porto-Novo, but the seat of government is Cotonou. Benin was known as Dahomey until 1975.

== General reference ==
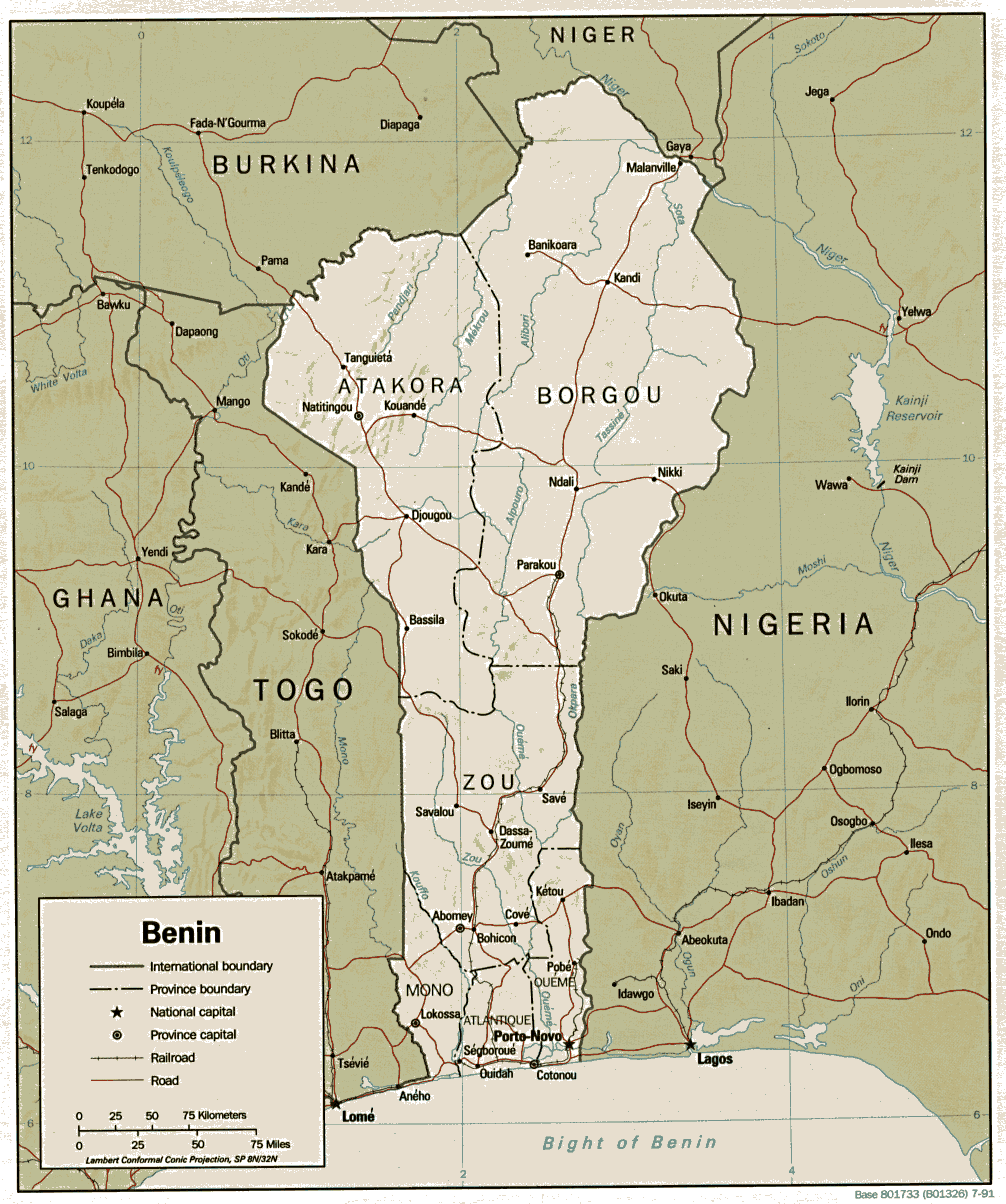
An enlargeable map of Benin

- Pronunciation:
- Common English country name: Benin
- Official English country name: The Republic of Benin
- Common endonym(s): List of countries and capitals in native languages
- Official endonym(s): List of official endonyms of present-day nations and states
- Adjectival(s): Beninese
- Demonym(s): Beninese
- Etymology: Name of Benin
- ISO country codes: BJ, BEN, 204
- ISO region codes: See ISO 3166-2:BJ
- Internet country code top-level domain: .bj

== Geography of Benin ==
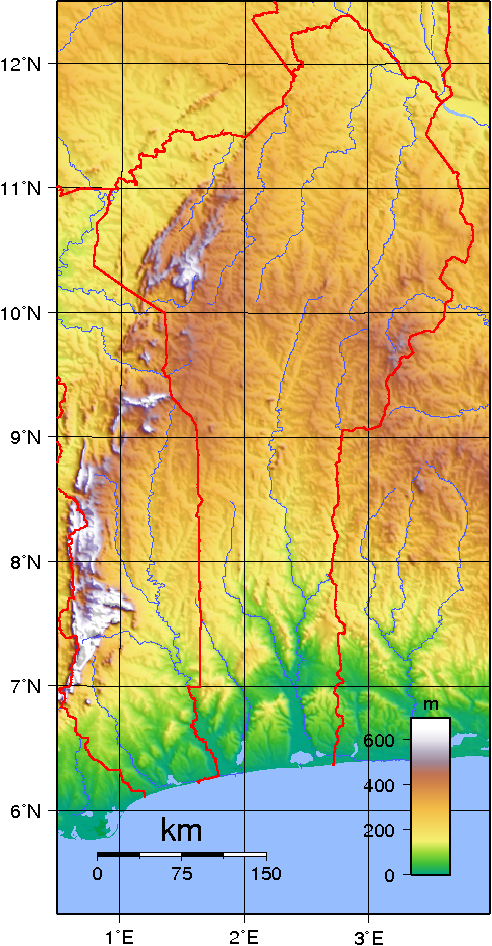
An enlargeable topographic map of Benin

Geography of Benin

- Benin is: a country
- Population of Benin: 8,439,000(2005) - 77th most populous country
- Area of Benin: 112,622 square kilometres (43,484 sq mi) - 101st largest country
- Atlas of Benin

=== Location ===
- Benin is situated within the following regions:
  - Northern Hemisphere and Eastern Hemisphere
    - Africa
      - West Africa
  - Time zone: West Africa Time (UTC+01)
- Extreme points of Benin
  - High: Mont Sokbaro 658 m (2,159 ft)
  - Low: Bight of Benin 0 m
- Land boundaries: 1,989 km

Nigeria 773 km
Togo 644 km
Burkina Faso 306 km
Niger 266 km

- Coastline: 121 km

=== Environment of Benin ===
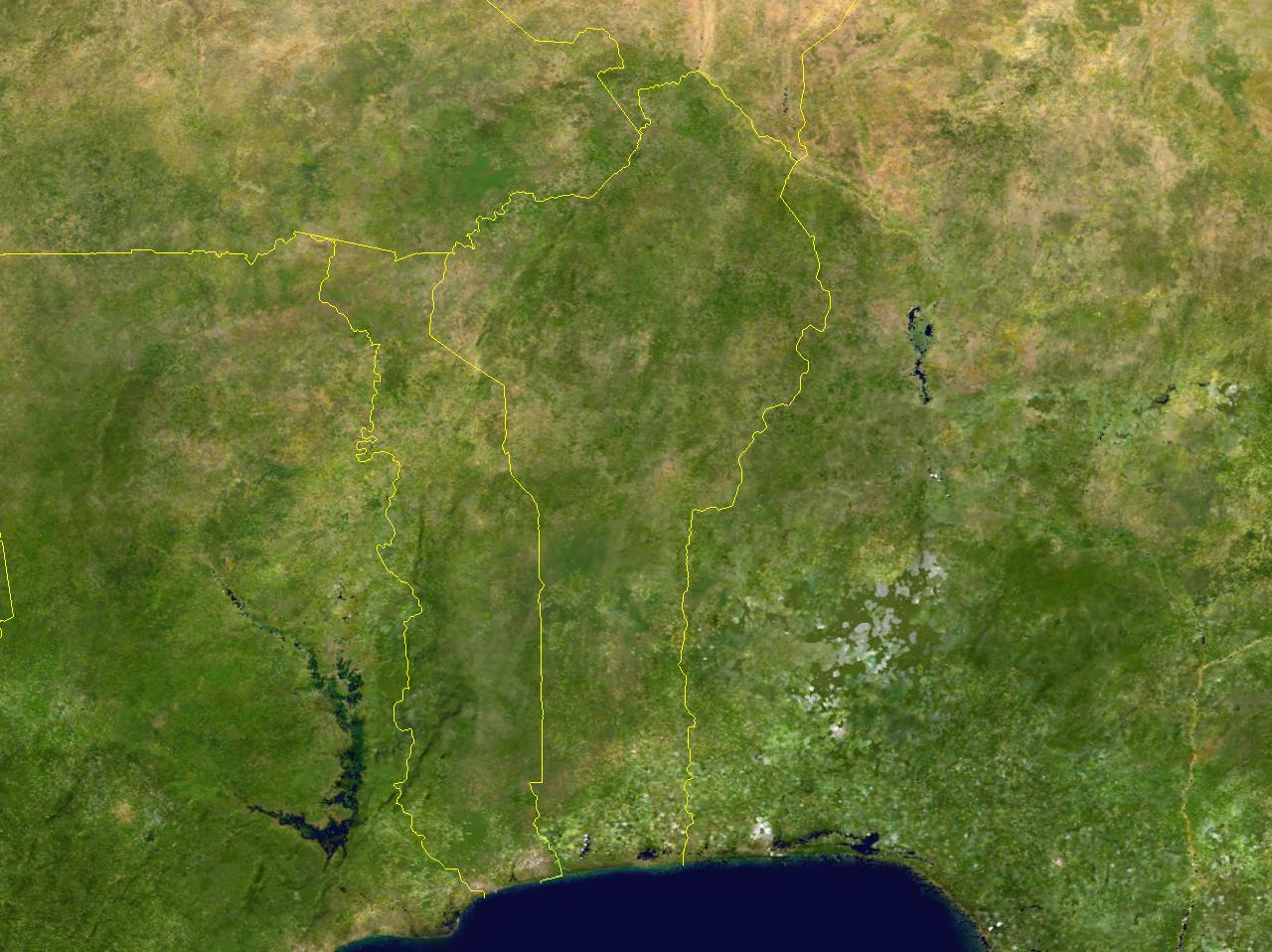
An enlargeable satellite image of Benin

- Climate of Benin
- Ecoregions in Benin
- Protected areas of Benin
  - National parks of Benin
- Wildlife of Benin
  - Fauna of Benin
    - Birds of Benin
    - Mammals of Benin

==== Natural geographic features of Benin ====
- Glaciers in Benin: none
- Lakes of Benin
  - Lake Ahémé
  - Lake Nokoué
- Rivers of Benin
  - Couffo River
  - Mono River
  - Niger River
    - Alibori River
    - Mékrou River
    - Oti River
    - Sota River
  - Ouémé River
- World Heritage Sites in Benin

=== Regions of Benin ===
==== Ecoregions of Benin ====
List of ecoregions in Benin

==== Administrative divisions of Benin ====
Subdivisions of Benin

- Provinces of Benin
  - Departments of Benin
    - Communes of Benin

===== Departments of Benin =====
Benin is divided into 12 departments:

- Alibori*
- Atakora
- Atlantique
- Borgou
- Collines*
- Donga*
- Kouffo*
- Littoral*
- Mono
- Ouémé
- Plateau*
- Zou

===== Communes of Benin =====
There are 77 communes in Benin.

===== Municipalities of Benin =====
- Capital of Benin: Porto-Novo
- Cities of Benin
  - Abomey
  - Abomey-Calavi
  - Allada
  - Aplahoué
  - Athiémé
  - Banikoara
  - Bassila
  - Bembèrèkè
  - Bohicon
  - Bori
  - Boukoumbé
  - Bétérou
  - Comé
  - Cotonou
  - Cové
  - Dassa-Zoumé
  - Djougou
  - Dogbo-Tota
  - Ganvie
  - Gogounou
  - Grand Popo
  - Kandi
  - Karimama
  - Kouandé
  - Kérou
  - Kétou
  - Lokossa
  - Malanville
  - Natitingou
  - Ndali (Benin)
  - Nikki, Benin
  - Ouidah
  - Parakou
  - Pobé
  - Porga
  - Porto-Novo
  - Péhonko
  - Sakété
  - Savalou
  - Savé
  - Segboroué
  - Ségbana
  - Tanguietta
  - Tanguiéta
  - Tchaourou

== Government and politics of Benin ==
- Form of government: Presidential representative democratic republic
- Capital of Benin: Porto-Novo
- Elections in Benin
- Political parties in Benin
  - Action Front for Renewal and Development
  - African Movement for Development and Progress
  - Alliance for Social Democracy
  - Alliance of Progress Forces (Benin)
  - Benin Rebirth Party
  - Builders and Managers of Freedom and Democracy
  - Communist Party of Benin
  - Congress of People for Progress
  - Democratic Renewal Party (Benin)
  - Hope Force
  - Impulse to Progress and Democracy
  - Key Force
  - Liberal Democrats' Rally for National Reconstruction-Vivoten
  - Marxist-Leninist Communist Party of Benin
  - Movement for Citizens' Commitment and Awakening
  - Movement for Development and Solidarity
  - Movement for Development by Culture
  - Movement for the People's Alternative
  - National Party "Together"
  - National Rally for Democracy (Benin)
  - New Alliance
  - People's Republican Union
  - Rally for Democracy and Progress (Benin)
  - Party of Salvation
  - Social Democratic Party (Benin)
  - Star Alliance (Benin)
  - The Greens (Benin)
  - Union for Democracy and National Solidarity
  - Union for Future Benin
  - Union for Homeland and Labour
  - Union for the Nation
  - Union of Communists of Dahomey

=== Branches of government ===
==== Executive branch of the government of Benin ====
- Head of state: President of Benin
- Head of government: Prime Minister of Benin

==== Legislative branch of the government of Benin ====
- National Assembly of Benin (unicameral parliament)

==== Judicial branch of the government of Benin ====
- High Court of Justice of Benin – made up of members of the Constitutional Court, Parliament and the president of the Supreme Court. It alone can judge the President.

=== Foreign relations of Benin ===
Foreign relations of Benin

- Diplomatic missions in Benin
- Diplomatic missions of Benin
- United States-Benin relations

==== International organization membership ====
The Republic of Benin is a member of:

- African Development Bank Group (AfDB)
- African Union (AU)
- African, Caribbean, and Pacific Group of States (ACP)
- Conference des Ministres des Finances des Pays de la Zone Franc (FZ)
- Council of the Entente (Entente)
- Economic Community of West African States (ECOWAS)
- Food and Agriculture Organization (FAO)
- Group of 77 (G77)
- International Atomic Energy Agency (IAEA)
- International Bank for Reconstruction and Development (IBRD)
- International Civil Aviation Organization (ICAO)
- International Criminal Court (ICCt)
- International Criminal Police Organization (Interpol)
- International Development Association (IDA)
- International Federation of Red Cross and Red Crescent Societies (IFRCS)
- International Finance Corporation (IFC)
- International Fund for Agricultural Development (IFAD)
- International Labour Organization (ILO)
- International Maritime Organization (IMO)
- International Monetary Fund (IMF)
- International Olympic Committee (IOC)
- International Organization for Migration (IOM)
- International Organization for Standardization (ISO) (correspondent)
- International Red Cross and Red Crescent Movement (ICRM)
- International Telecommunication Union (ITU)
- International Telecommunications Satellite Organization (ITSO)
- International Trade Union Confederation (ITUC)
- Inter-Parliamentary Union (IPU)
- Islamic Development Bank (IDB)
- Multilateral Investment Guarantee Agency (MIGA)
- Nonaligned Movement (NAM)
- Organisation internationale de la Francophonie (OIF)
- Organisation of Islamic Cooperation (OIC)
- Organisation for the Prohibition of Chemical Weapons (OPCW)
- Organization of American States (OAS) (observer)
- Permanent Court of Arbitration (PCA)
- United Nations (UN)
- United Nations Conference on Trade and Development (UNCTAD)
- United Nations Educational, Scientific, and Cultural Organization (UNESCO)
- United Nations High Commissioner for Refugees (UNHCR)
- United Nations Industrial Development Organization (UNIDO)
- United Nations Mission in Liberia (UNMIL)
- United Nations Mission in the Sudan (UNMIS)
- United Nations Operation in Cote d'Ivoire (UNOCI)
- United Nations Organization Mission in the Democratic Republic of the Congo (MONUC)
- Universal Postal Union (UPU)
- West African Development Bank (WADB) (regional)
- West African Economic and Monetary Union (WAEMU)
- World Confederation of Labour (WCL)
- World Customs Organization (WCO)
- World Federation of Trade Unions (WFTU)
- World Health Organization (WHO)
- World Intellectual Property Organization (WIPO)
- World Meteorological Organization (WMO)
- World Tourism Organization (UNWTO)
- World Trade Organization (WTO)

=== Law and order in Benin ===
- Constitution of Benin
- Crime in Benin
- Human rights in Benin
  - LGBT rights in Benin
  - Freedom of religion in Benin
- Law enforcement in Benin

=== Military of Benin ===
Military of Benin

- Command
  - Commander-in-chief:
- Forces
  - Army of Benin
  - Navy of Benin
  - Air Force of Benin

== History of Benin ==
History of Benin

- History of Benin
- Amedzofe (history)
- Béhanzin
- Benin Empire
- Borgu
- Colonial heads of São João Baptista de Ajudá
- Cotonou Agreement
- Ketu (Benin)
- List of presidents of Benin
- People's Republic of Benin
- Punitive Expedition of 1897
- Rulers of the Bariba state of Nikki
- Rulers of the Fon state of Alada
- Rulers of the Fon state of Savi Hweda

=== Dahomey ===
- Dahomey
- Abomey
- Adandozan
- Agaja
- Agoli-agbo
- Agonglo
- Akaba
- Arrada
- Battle of Abomey
- Béhanzin
- Colonial heads of Benin (Dahomey)
- Dahomey Amazons
- Dahomey War
  - First Franco-Dahomean War
  - Second Franco-Dahomean War
- Dakodonou
- Gangnihessou
- Ghezo
- Glele
- Houegbadja
- Kpengla
- Rulers of the Fon state of Danhome
- Tegbessou
- The annual customs of Dahomey
- West African Vodun

=== Disasters in Benin ===
- UTA Flight 141

=== Elections in Benin ===
- Elections in Benin
- Benin presidential election, 2001
- Beninese presidential election, 2006
- Dahomey legislative election, 1959

== Culture of Benin ==
Culture of Benin

- Buildings and structures in Benin
  - Sports venues in Benin
    - Stade de l'Amitié
    - Football venues in Benin
- L'Aube Nouvelle
- Media in Benin
- Mythology in Benin
  - Dahomey mythology
    - Dahomey deities
      - Nana Buluku
    - Dahomey goddesses
      - Gleti
      - Mahu
    - Dahomey gods
      - Xɛvioso
- National symbols of Benin
  - Coat of arms of Benin
  - Flag of Benin
  - National anthem of Benin
- Public holidays in Benin
- World Heritage Sites in Benin
  - Royal Palaces of Abomey
- Guides du Bénin
- Scoutisme Béninois

=== Art in Benin ===
- Literature of Benin
  - Beninese writers
- Music of Benin
  - Gangbe brass band
  - Beninese hip hop

=== Ethnic groups in Benin ===
- Aja people
- Ewe people
- Fon people
- Tem peopleTem people
- Gurma
- Mahi people
- Rulers of the Gurma Mossi state of Nungu
- Yoruba people
  - Yoruba language
  - Yoruba twins

=== Languages of Benin ===
- Languages of Benin
- Fon language
- Gen language
- Kabiyé language
- Phla–Pherá languages
- Yoruba language
- Mina
- Goun
- Dendi
- Natimba

=== Religion in Benin ===
- Religion in Benin
  - Christianity in Benin
    - Celestial Church of Christ
    - Roman Catholicism in Benin
  - Islam in Benin

=== Sports in Benin ===
==== Football in Benin ====
- Football in Benin
- Benin national football team
- Benin Football Federation

==== Benin at the Olympics ====
- Benin at the Olympics
- Benin at the 1980 Summer Olympics
- Benin at the 1984 Summer Olympics
- Benin at the 1988 Summer Olympics
- Benin at the 1992 Summer Olympics
- Benin at the 1996 Summer Olympics
- Benin at the 2000 Summer Olympics
- Benin at the 2004 Summer Olympics

== Economy and infrastructure of Benin ==
Economy of Benin

- Economic rank, by nominal GDP (2007): 136th (one hundred and thirty sixth)
- Agriculture in Benin
  - Fishing in Benin
- Communications in Benin
  - Internet in Benin
- Companies of Benin
- Currency of Benin: Franc
  - ISO 4217: XOF
- Energy in Benin
- Health in Benin
- Mineral industry of Benin
  - Mining in Benin
- Tourism in Benin
  - Visa policy of Benin
- Trade unions in Benin
  - Autonomous Trade Unions Centre
  - General Confederation of the Workers of Benin
  - National Union of the Unions of the Workers of Benin
- Transport in Benin
  - Air transport in Benin
    - Airports in Benin
      - Cadjehoun Airport
    - Airlines of Benin
      - Aero Benin
      - Afrique Airlines
      - Benin Golf Air
      - Trans Air Benin
      - West African Airlines
      - Zircon Airways Benin
  - Rail transport in Benin
- Water supply and sanitation in Benin

== See also ==
- List of Benin-related topics
- List of international rankings
- Member state of the United Nations
- Outline of Africa
- Outline of geography

Stubs

- Action Front for Renewal and Development
- Adigo Dinalo
- Aero Benin
- African Movement for Development and Progress
- Alain Gaspoz
- Alliance for Social Democracy
- Alliance of Progress Forces (Benin)
- Alphonse Amadou Alley
- Anicet Adjamonsi
- Antoine Idji Kolawolé
- Autonomous Trade Unions Centre
- Benin Rebirth Party
- Bruno Amoussou
- Builders and Managers of Freedom and Democracy
- Christophe Soglo
- Coffi Codjia
- Communist Party of Benin
- Congress of People for Progress
- Damien Chrysostome
- Emile Derlin Zinsou
- Frédéric Dohou
- Félicien Singbo
- Gangbe brass band
- Hope Force
- Houegbadja
- Hubert Maga
- Islam in Benin
- Ismaël Tidjani Serpos
- Jacob U. Egharevba
- Jerome Sacca Kina Guezere
- Jocelyn Ahouéya
- Jonas Okétola
- Justin Ahomadegbé-Tomêtin
- Key Force
- Laurent D'Jaffo
- Liberal Democrats' Rally for National Reconstruction-Vivoten
- Mariam Aladji Boni Diallo
- Marxist-Leninist Communist Party of Benin
- Maurice Kouandété
- Maxime Agueh
- Michel Aikpé
- Military of Benin
- Mouritala Ogunbiyi
- Moussa Latoundji
- Moussoro Kabirou
- Moustapha Agnidé
- Movement for Citizens' Commitment and Awakening
- Movement for Development and Solidarity
- Movement for Development by Culture
- Movement for the People's Alternative
- National Party "Together"
- National Rally for Democracy (Benin)
- New Alliance
- Olympe Bhely-Quenum
- Omar Tchomogo
- Orou Gabé Orou Sego
- Pascal Fantodji
- People's Republic of Benin
- People's Republican Union
- Pierre Osho
- Public holidays in Benin
- Rachad Chitou
- Rally for Democracy and Progress (Benin)
- Rodrigue Akpakoun
- Rogatien Biaou
- Roman Catholicism in Benin
- Rosine Vieyra Soglo
- Party of Salvation
- Samuel Emmanuel Suka
- Seydath Tchomogo
- Seïdou Mama Sika
- Simon Idohou
- Social Democratic Party (Benin)
- Sourou-Migan Apithy
- Star Alliance (Benin)
- Sylvain Remy
- Tahirou Congacou
- Template:Benin-stub
- The Greens (Benin)
- Tony Toklomety
- Union for Democracy and National Solidarity
- Union for Future Benin
- Union for Homeland and Labour
- Union for the Nation
- Union of Communists of Dahomey
- Zircon Airways Benin
- Émile Zinsou
