= Dorothée Lima =

Dorothée Joaquim Lima was a newspaper editor and publisher in Dahomey who was instrumental in the development of news media in Dahomey during the French colonial era. With Jean Adjovi he edited the influential but short-lived Le Guide du Dahomey (1920-22). Later, he replaced Jean Adjovi as the editor of La Voix du Dahomey.

Lima was a Dahomey born, naturalised French citizen who had been educated at a Catholic mission at Porto Novo. He served in the French colonial administration before World War I. He was one of the group of returnees from Brazil who were important in the life of the colony in the early twentieth century.

Avenue Dorothée Lima is named in his honour in Cotonou, Benin.
