= L'Aube =

L'Aube (The Dawn) may refer to:

- L'Aube (newspaper), French newspaper published from 1932 to 1951
- "L'Aube Nouvelle", national anthem of Benin
- The Aube, department of France
- Stade de l'Aube, multi-use stadium in Troyes, France
- Dawn (1985 film), 1985 French-Hungarian drama film
- L'Aube, a poetry collection of 1904 by Louis Pergaud
