= La Presse (disambiguation) =

La Presse is a Canadian newspaper published in Montreal, Canada.

La Presse can also refer to the following newspapers or news agencies:

- La Presse (French newspaper), published in the 19th and early 20th century
- La Presse de Tunisie, a Tunisian newspaper
- La Presse Porto-Novienne, newspaper published in Porto-Novo, Benin
