= Issifou Kogui N'Douro =

Minister of State for National Defense of Benin
- In office April 6, 2006 – 2012
- Preceded by: Martin Azonhiho

Personal details
- Born: January 1, 1949 (age 77) Bembereke, French Dahomey (now Benin)
- Education: University of Strasbourg
- Occupation: Geographer

Issifou Kogui N'Douro is a Beninois politician who served as Minister of State for National Defense between 2006 and 2012, and later as a presidential candidate in the 2016 Beninese presidential election.

== Biography ==
N'Douro was born in Bembèrèkè, Benin on January 1, 1949. He is a geographer, with a degree in land-use planning from the University of Strasbourg. N'Douro began his career as a research officer for the UNDP program monitoring vegetation cover in Benin. In 1991, N'Douro began working at the Organisation internationale de la Francophonie (OIF) in Paris as deputy director of finance. He then served as Principal Director of Development Programs until he was called back to Benin in April 2006 to serve as Minister of State for National Defense in the first Thomas Boni Yayi administration.

As defense minister, N'Douro mediated in the Second Ivorian Civil War, the Chadian Civil War, the Tuareg rebellion, and the civil war in the Congo. He also deployed Beninese peacekeepers to these countries. After 2012, N'Douro was appointed Minister of State for Presidential Affairs until 2013.

In 2016, N'Douro launched his presidential campaign called "Twelve Projects for the Development and Modernization of Benin." He was defeated in the 2016 presidential election, receiving only 5,000 votes.
