= Mass media in Benin =

Mass media in Benin was formerly controlled by the government but there has been a loosening of control since the introduction of democracy to the country in the 1990s.

== See also ==
- Agence Bénin Presse
- Communications in Benin
- Censorship in Benin
- List of newspapers in Benin
- List of radio stations in Africa: Benin

== Bibliography ==
- "Benin", Freedom of the Press, USA: Freedom House, 2016, OCLC 57509361, archived from the original on 2019-02-12
