= Autonomous Trade Unions Centre =

- Central des Syndicats Autonomes du Bénin
- Abbreviation: CSA
- Headquarters: Cotonou, Benin
- Location: Benin
- Members: 20,000
- Key people: Sanni Bonaventure, president
- Affiliations: ITUC

The Autonomous Trade Unions Centre (French: Central des Syndicats Autonomes du Bénin) is a trade union centre in Benin. It has a membership of 20,000 and is affiliated with the International Trade Union Confederation. It also works with the National Union of the Unions of the Workers of Benin.

== See also ==
- Trade unions in Benin
