= Recadaire de Behanzin =

Recadaire de Behanzin is an anti-government newspaper published in Benin.

It was established in 1915 and Emile Zinsou Bode was one of its founders.

== See also ==
- List of newspapers in Benin
