= Water supply and sanitation in Benin =

Data
- Water coverage (broad definition): (improved) 75% (2010)
- Sanitation coverage (broad definition): (improved) 12% (2010)
- Continuity of supply: 24 hours in Cotonou, but depending on electricity
- Average urban water use (L/person/day): 29
- Average urban water and sanitation tariff (US$/m^{3}): 0.41 for the first five m³
- Share of household metering: n/a
- Annual investment in WSS: less than US$2/capita in rural areas (1999–2002)
- Share of self-financing by utilities: Operation and Maintenance: High
- Share of tax-financing: not available
- Share of external financing: High

Institutions
- Decentralization to municipalities: For rural areas, since 1999
- National water and sanitation company: National Water Company of Benin (SONEB)
- Water and sanitation regulator: None
- Responsibility for policy setting: Water: Ministry of Mines, Energy and Water; Sanitation: Hygiene and Basic Sanitation Authority under the Ministry of Health
- Sector law: Yes, but ineffective
- No. of urban service providers: 1
- No. of rural service providers: not available

Drinking water supply and sanitation in Benin has been subject to considerable progress since the 1990s, in particular in rural areas, where coverage is higher than in many other African countries, and almost all development partners follow a national demand-responsive strategy, which has been adopted in 1992. New strategies to increase water supply in rural and urban areas have been adopted in 2005 and 2006. Tariffs in urban and rural areas are usually high enough to cover the costs for operation and maintenance.

However, challenges remain. A coherent institutional framework has been developed for rural areas and projects have been implemented with strong help by external donors. Responsibilities in water supply have been defined in a national strategy in 2007 and the national utility SONEB receives significant support in terms of investment and technical assistance. Sanitation receives less attention. Wastewater treatment hardly exists.

In order to reach the Millennium Development Goals (MDGs) concerning water and sanitation, the Ministry of Economic and Financial Development estimates that US$80 million and US$22 million, respectively are needed per year from 2006 to 2015. For the sake of comparison, less than US$ 10m per year have been invested in water supply and sanitation in rural areas where 55% of the population of Benin lives. No figures are available on actual investments in urban areas. Most likely, investments would have to increase manifold in order to reach the MDGs.

== Access ==
In 2015, in Benin 78% of the population had access to "improved" water, 85% and 72%, in urban and rural areas, respectively. In 2015, there were still around 2 million lacking access to "improved" water. Regarding sanitation, 20% of the population had access to "improved" sanitation, 36% and 7%, in urban and rural areas, respectively.

According to the Joint Monitoring Program of the World Health Organization and UNICEF, three quarters of the Beninese population had access to an improved water source in 2008, whereas 12% had access to improved sanitation. The share rose from 63% concerning water and from 5% concerning sanitation in 1990. Coverage in urban areas is considerably higher than in rural areas.

Access to water and sanitation in Benin (2008)
		Urban (41% of the population)	Rural (59% of the population)	Total
Water	Improved water source	84%	69%	75%
Water	Piped on premises	26%	2%	12%
Sanitation	Improved sanitation	24%	4%	12%

Significant differences in water supply coverage were found among regions. The situation depends on the accessibility to ground water, the geographic orientation of donor investment programs and the effective demand of the inhabitants of a community or region. In urban areas, lack of access to safe water is mostly concentrated in the outskirts of cities.

The national government uses another definition of access, under which water supply coverage was 50% in urban and peri-urban areas and 41% in rural and semi-urban areas in 2005. The annual water sector review for the financial year 2009 indicated 55,1% access for rural and 57% for urban areas. In order to reach the MDGs, the national government's strategy is to increase coverage to 75% in urban and peri-urban areas and 67.5% in rural and semi-urban areas by 2015. Concerning sanitation, the Ministry of Economic and Financial Development reported that in 2003 67% of the population did not have adequate facilities for the disposal of excrements. The annual sector review indicated an access of households to sanitation facilities of 39,4% and 71,6%, of school children, in 2009.

=== Definition of urban and rural areas ===
Like in other countries, the Beninese water supply sector is divided into an urban and a rural sector and then is sent over to the poor. However, in the documents rural areas include semi-urban areas and urban areas include peri-urban areas. In 2002, rural and semi-urban areas were defined as settlements with less than 10,000 inhabitants and 22 secondary towns with more than 10,000 inhabitants, whereas the remaining areas were called urban and peri-urban.

== Service quality ==
=== Continuity of supply ===
Substantial investments in the Greater Cotonou Area have not been effected since 1991. The fast-growing water demand (6 – 8% p.a.) is exceeding the actual design capacity of the well fields, two treatment plants and the distribution system. This results in low water pressure, which often limits the consumption in peripheral areas. Water supply in Cotonou is generally available for 24 hours per day, the system, however is badly affected by power cuts of the Beninese Society of Electricity and Water public energy utility. About 50% of the power demand of pump sets can be provided through generator sets to fill the pipeline system and its water towers. Frequent power failures reduce the reliability of the system. However, substantial extension works are financed and programmed since 2007/2008 with support of major donors (West African Development Bank, European Investment Bank, KfW Entwicklungsbank, Netherlands). Implementation is ongoing (see below).

=== Drinking water quality ===
There has been no broad assessment about water quality in Benin. Under the framework of a study which analyzed water supply in peri-urban areas of Cotonou, water samples were collected from water kiosks, a water seller, a communal well and Lake Nokoue in the peri-urban Cotonouan districts of Ladji and Vossa. The study concludes that the samples from the water kiosks and the water seller were of good quality. Private water sellers connected to the SONEB utility network are widespread in urban areas, serving households not yet connected to the grid. The Ministry in charge of water and SONEB have fixed a special ‘pro-poor’ tariff for water resale to regulate this phenomenon, in July 2009. Implementation is ongoing in cooperation with local government.

Saltwater intrusion has been reported close to Cotonou, where drinking water is withdrawn.

=== Wastewater treatment ===
Wastewater treatment is extremely rare in Benin. In most cases, wastewater is not even disposed appropriately. According to a 2001 national health survey, in the cities of Cotonou, Parakou and Porto-Novo, only two out of 1,000 households dispose their wastewater in a correct way, while most of them discharge it directly into the nature or drains. This leads to pollution and can cause water-borne diseases like malaria and typhoid fever.

According to a 2004 article, Cotonou is the only town in Benin which has a functioning wastewater treatment plant, where sludge from septic tanks and latrines is treated. Another article reports that the treatment plant, operated by the private Industrial Society of Urban Equipment and Sanitation (SIBEAU) treats about 240–300 m³ per day. The company charges tariffs for treating the sludge from septic tank truckers. The wastewater receives primary and secondary treatment and is afterwards dumped into the ocean. In addition, some local institutions like a hospital and hotels operate their own water treatment facilities.

== Water resources ==
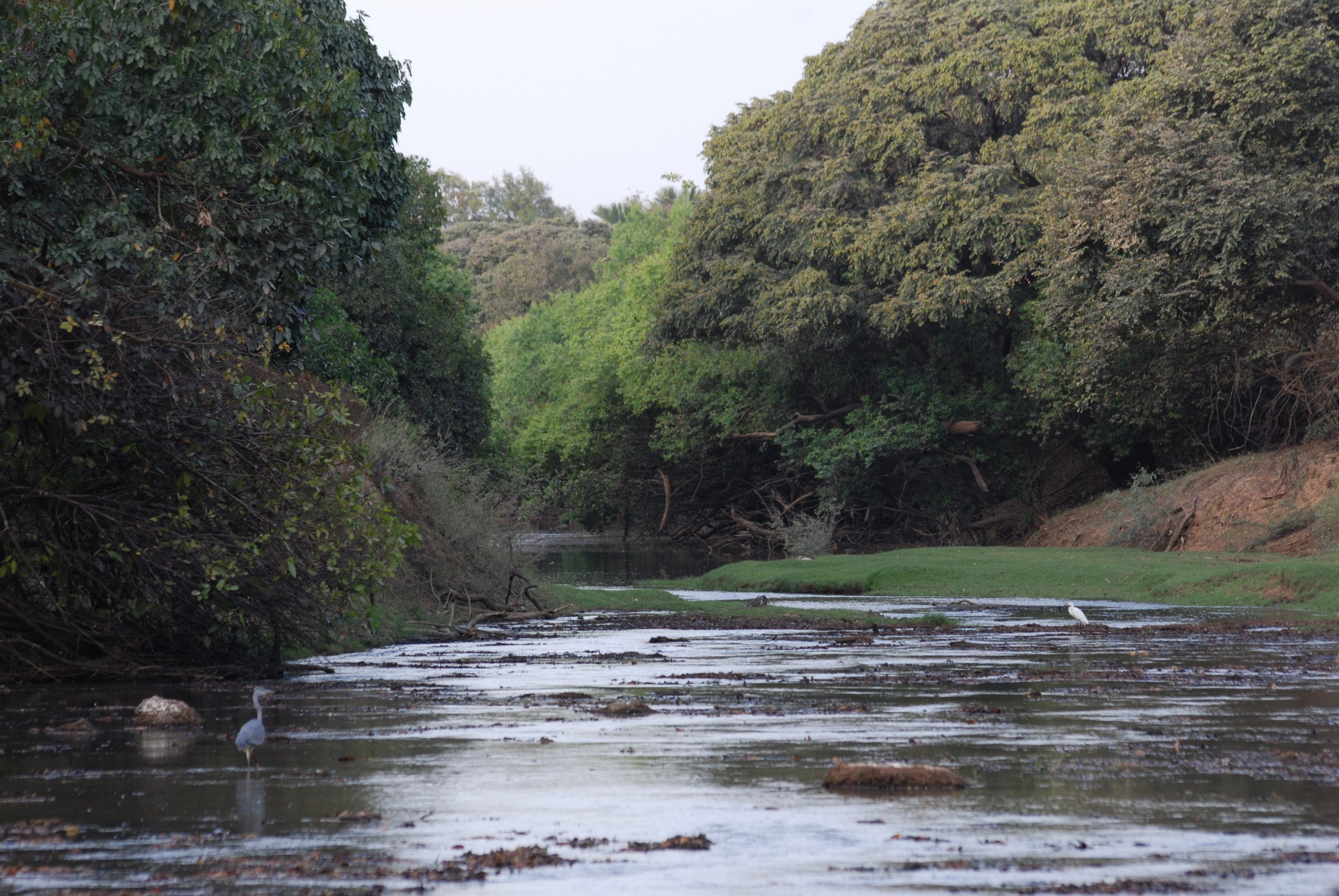
River in the Pendjari National Park in the dry-season

It is estimated that the available water resources in Benin are sufficient to meet the current and future demand, even if agricultural and industrial consumption are included. The current water use is about 1% of the available resources. The total amount of renewable water resources in the country is estimated at 3,954 m³ per person and year, an amount whereby water shortages only occur irregularly or locally according to a definition of Falkenmark and Widstrand. 2000 km² or 1.8% of the total surface area of Benin (112,620 km²) is covered by water. Rainfall averages 1,039 mm per year, but varies considerably among region and season.

In 2021, the European Investment Bank provided a €50 million loan to help Cotonou in improving stormwater management, specifically by upgrading stormwater drainage to capture plastic. The initiative will lessen floods near buildings, benefiting 187,000 people in and around Cotonou while also reducing plastic and other pollutants in the Gulf of Guinea.

== Water use ==
A study published in 2005 indicates an average consumption of 17 liters per capita and day (L/c/d) in rural areas and 29 L/c/d in cities. The authors explain the very low water use in rural areas with a lack of water sources, long distances from villages to wells and limited resources in dry seasons. In the outskirts of the town areas, they found situations similar to those in rural areas. They expect an increasing water demand due to urbanization and increasing living standards. The Food and Agriculture Organization (FAO) of the United Nations indicates that in 2001, 32% of the total water withdrawal was used for domestic purposes, while 45% was used for agriculture and 23% by the industry.

In 2021, heavy rain in Benin caused widespread flooding, causing significant damage to water resources and financial losses. Because heavy rains have continued to fall in the area, large volumes of plastics and other debris are being released into Lake Nokoué and the Gulf of Guinea via open drains, making water resources scarce.

== History and recent developments ==
=== History ===
Souterrains dated from 17th–19th century were built by the Kingdom of Dahomey for different functions including water storage or to serve as seasonal cisterns.

Rural areas: Under the framework of the United Nations International Drinking Water Supply and Sanitation Decade (1981–1990), Benin launched a campaign and installed 5,350 water points. The result of these efforts revealed some weaknesses within the strategy, i.e. (i) lack of user participation in the installation of water points; (ii) lack of health and hygiene education; (iii) lack of investments in hygiene and sanitation; (iv) lack of community inclusion in the administration and operation of the water points; and (v) poor rate of functioning water points.

Since these efforts and investments in the sector had proved to be little sustainable, a new demand-responsive strategy for rural water supply and sanitation was prepared with the help of the World Bank and adopted in 1992. The strategy is based on the four principles of

- Decentralization of decision making
- Financial contribution of the communities to the initial investments (about 3-10% of the total costs)
- Search for cost-cutting measures concerning operation and maintenance of facilities
- Privatization of construction and operation activities

Furthermore, the strategy contains two more basic principles, which are not explicitly mentioned as such:

- Integration of hygiene education in rural water programs
- Redefinition of the role of the General Water Authority (DGEau), which becomes the sector regulator and facilitator

The new strategy has since then been implemented through a number of projects called Assistance Program for the Development of the Water supply and Sanitation sector in Rural areas (PADEAR) with the strong help of several development partners. The strategy was revised in 2003 in view of a new institutional framework, the national poverty reduction strategy and the MDGs, support of delegation of works and an analysis of the time which had passed since the application of the strategy.

In 1995, a national sanitation policy was adopted. Its objectives were similar to those of the 1992 strategy for rural water supply and sanitation.

Urban and peri-urban areas: Until 2002, water and electricity were both supplied by the Beninese Society of Electricity and Water. Afterwards, much of the electricity sector has been privatized, whereas the urban water sector remained public and has been provided by the National Water Society of Benin (SONEB).

=== Latest national strategies ===
In both urban and rural areas new strategies have been adopted in 2005 and 2006 with the objective to reach the MDGs concerning water supply by 2015.

Rural and semi-urban areas: The new strategy for the period from 2005 to 2015 follows the national strategy of 1992 and aims to reach the MDGs. Its principles are similar to those of the 1992 strategy, but adapted to the modified political and institutional frameworks. Like the former one, the strategy is based on a demand-responsive approach and has five principles:

- Decentralization of the decision-making process to the municipalities, which act based on a demand-responsive approach
- User participation in financing, operation and maintenance including rehabilitation of the facilities and construction works
- Research to find ways to reduce water tariffs through taking into consideration low cost technologies
- Privatization of construction, operation, maintenance and social mediation with a particular effort to increase the professionalism of local operators in the sector
- Reinforcement of the technical and administrative decentralization of the central administration in its role as sector regulator and establishment of functional relations between the decentralized municipal structures

In May 2004, the call for a Water Initiative for semi-urban areas which are not covered by SONEB emerged. The initiative, which has not yet been implemented in 2006 aims to reach the MDGs in these areas through the construction of rural water supply schemes in about 500 towns by 2015.

Urban and peri-urban areas: The 2006 to 2015 strategy for urban water supply, besides reaching the MDGs by 2015 has the objectives to facilitate the financial viability of public water supply and provide access for poorer households. The strategy is based on four principles:

- The involved actors play their respective parts in a coherent legal and institutional framework
- The achievement of the MDGs is based on a continuous and harmonious sector development
- The sustainability of the sector is backed by an economical and efficacious public water supply
- The access to water supply for people with lower incomes is a fundamental imperative of national solidarity

Concerning sanitation, the National Hygiene and Basic Sanitation Program covers the period from 2004 to 2008. It is divided into three sub-programs:

- Hygiene and basic sanitation promotion in rural areas
- Hygiene and basic sanitation promotion in urban areas
- Institutional support for the Hygiene and Basic Sanitation Authority (DHAB) under the Ministry of Health and its decentralized structures

== Responsibility for water supply and sanitation ==
=== Policy and regulation ===
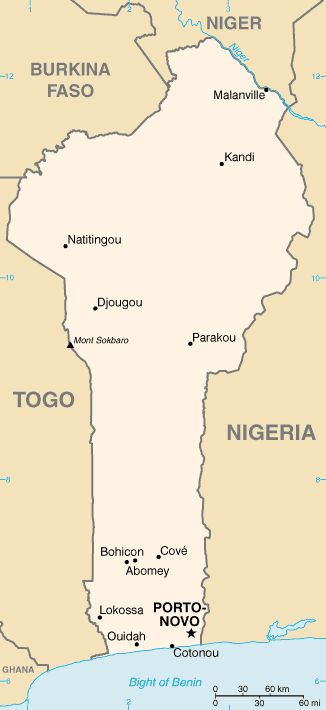
Map of Benin

The national Ministry of Energy and Water sets general water sector policies and supervises their application. National sanitation policies are defined by the Hygiene and Basic Sanitation Authority (DHAB) under the Ministry of Health.

Benin is currently in the process of implementing a decentralization policy, under which water supply and sanitation becomes responsibility of the 77 municipalities, which count between 25,000 and 600,000 inhabitants. Each municipality is headed by an elected council and a mayor. According to Law No. 97-029 of 1999 on the organization of municipalities, they have full responsibility to provide drinking water and sanitation. The law also provides for the municipalities' right to request technical assistance from the national level or the private sector. Furthermore, the national government is responsible for the transfer of the necessary financial resources for the execution of the tasks to the municipalities.

In rural and semi-urban areas, the General Water Authority (DGEau) under the Ministry of Energy and Water is expected to implement the national policies, to coordinate water use for different purposes and to promote Integrated Water Resources Management. In addition, DGEau has the task to set up and maintain a database on water resources and their mobilization. In order to ensure that the national policies are implemented at the local level, DGEau is represented by 11 Water Service divisions and uses six Department divisions of the Ministry of Energy and Water. Under the framework of decentralization, responsibilities were shifted from DGEau to its local divisions.

There is no independent agency for economic regulation of the water and sanitation sector. The national 2007 Growth Strategy for Poverty Reduction calls for the establishment of such an authority.

=== Service provision ===
Since the decentralization process, the municipalities and their established Water User Associations became responsible for operation and maintenance of water supply and sanitation. In rural and semi-urban areas, they receive support by DGEau. In urban and peri-urban areas, the National Water Society of Benin (SONEB) has been assigned to assure urban water supply and waste water treatment on behalf of local authorities SONEB supplied 69 urban districts in 2007. Eighty percent of the urban water supply demand is concentrated in Cotonou, Porto-Novo, Parakou and Abomey/Bohicon. Like DGEau, SONEB is placed under the Ministry of Energy and Water. SONEB is a public company, but autonomous in decision-making and financial administration.

Concerning sanitation, the Hygiene and Basic Sanitation Authority provides sanitation in public places like schools and health centers. The authority shares responsibility for sanitation with SONEB, communities and departments of the Ministry of Environment, Housing and Urbanism and the Ministry of Public Works and Transportation.

=== Other functions ===
Private sector: In rural areas, private sector participation is supported under the PADEAR strategy. For instance, the private drilling companies FORAG and FORATECH install about 1,000 new water points per year and private operators are also involved in maintenance activities. Besides this, private planning offices prepare feasibility studies and supervise the construction of facilities. Local artisans take over odd jobs. In urban areas, no private participation of SONEB is anticipated. However, in Cotonou the private company SIBEAU operates the only wastewater treatment plant in the country.

Non-governmental organizations: Many non-governmental organizations (NGOs) are active in Benin. They usually inform, advise and support the communities concerning their water supply responsibilities.

== Economic efficiency ==
Economic efficiency of water supply can be measured through several indicators. In Benin however, access to the respective data, in the case that they exist, is difficult. However, a frame contract (contract plan) for the period 2008–2010 between SONEB and the Ministry in charge of water has been signed January 2008. It contains an indicator set allowing to measure achievements of objectives of the urban water strategy adopted in 2007. SONEB documents these achievements in the yearly sector review.

One established indicator is the share of non-revenue water (NRW), water which is produced but not billed due to several reasons like leakage and illegal connections. According to the Beninese Ministry of Economic and Financial Development, NRW of SONEB was 21% in 2004. Although there is no agreement on appropriate levels of NRW among professionals, Tynan and Kingdom propose a best practice target of 23% in developing countries. According to the figures of the ministry, SONEB complies with that target.

== Financial aspects ==
=== Tariffs and cost recovery ===
Urban and peri-urban areas A tariff reform has been adopted in July 2009, based on a tariff study conducted in 2006. A preferential connection fee has been fixed at 50.000 CFA in the tariff system. There is no distinction between the different types of consumers (residential, commercial, industrial), but two block tariffs according to the amount of water consumption.

Before the tariff reform, US$0.41 per m³ without additional taxes was charged for the first five m³. For consumption exceeding five m³, the tariff was US$1.03 including taxes per m³. The tariff structure had been active since 2002. In addition, a fixed tariff of US$0.99 for the maintenance of a water meter is added. According to a thesis, tariffs cover most of the capital costs and all operating costs. In 2004, the revenue generated by water sales was US$16.7 million.

Rural and semi-urban areas Where AUE operate and maintain the services, they are expected to bear the costs of these tasks. According to the Danish International Development Agency (DANIDA), the sale of water can be very profitable and cover operation and maintenance costs. Water consumption is usually charged in the case of existing rural water supply schemes. Charging tariffs is less common if wells or hand pumps are used. A 2004 World Bank study assumes an average rural water tariff of US$1.04 (500 CFA) per m³ and equally concludes that this tariff usually covers operation and maintenance costs, including replacement. The study also mentions that in most cases the potable water is only used for cooking and drinking and alternate sources are used for other needs. It assumes an average consumption of only 5 L/p/d from improved sources. Consequently, water tariffs are affordable for most households.

=== Investment and financing ===
Substantial Investments in the country's water sector have been made since the 1980s. Investments in sanitation have started much later and have been lower. Despite this, there has been no review of sector investments until 2004.

Since 2002, the financial resources allocated to the Ministry of Energy and Water follow a three-year program budget, focusing on a unification of all funding (operational and investment costs) and a better replicability of the expenditures and its impacts.

It is difficult to draw up a comprehensive analysis of public expenditures in the water sector. The following figures derive from a 2004 World Bank study, which uses several budgetary documents. Since only the expenditure of the DGEau is shown, investment in urban areas is not included.

Executed Budget of DGEAu according to funding source in million US-Dollar
	1997	1998	1999	2000	2001	2002
Domestic	1.01	0.88	0.87	0.86	0.87	2.17
External	10.86	10.34	6.32	8.59	6.08	6.40
Total	11.87	11.22	7.19	9.45	6.96	8.57

The share of domestic funding increased from 9% in 1997 to 25% in 2002. However, the sector still depends strongly on external funding. Overall expenditure decreased from US$11.87 million in 1997 to US$8.57 million in 2002. The share of total government spending to the sector varied between 1.2 and 3.5%.

The Ministry of Economic and Financial Development reported in 2006 that there is no appropriate mechanism for the development of the urban water supply. External support is indispensable for the implementation of investment programs.

In 2009, the Ministry of Energy and Water and SONEB reported that corruption is a huge threat for the sector development. Financial resources often disappear into the pockets of politicians and contractors. Construction contracts often include inflated costs. Especially in rural areas, bribery of local officials is a common practice to ensure water supply.

==== Financing the latest national strategies ====
Rural and semi-urban areas The necessary financial resources to reach the MDGs in rural and semi-urban areas from 2006 to 2015 have been estimated to about US$396 million (189 billion CFA) or US$40 million per year. The Ministry of Economic and Financial Development concludes that the MDGs will not be achieved if the expenditures for the sector continue in the same amounts as in the years 2002 to 2005. However, if all available resources are mobilized, Benin will be able to reach the MDGs concerning rural water supply.

Urban and peri-urban areas The required financial resources to finance the achievement of the MDGs in urban and peri-urban areas have been estimated to be about US$400 million (191 billion CFA) or US$40 million per year from 2006 to 2015. The implementation of the 2006-2015 strategy to reach the MDGs in urban areas is expected to be financed by the national state, municipalities, development partners, financial institutions and SONEB. For small and medium water systems, financing will be provided by the municipalities, by the central state through public budgets, and by development partners. Large systems will be financed by the national state, municipalities, development banks and development agencies through credits and loans. Peri-urban areas and people with lower incomes will receive subsidies and donations with the help of development partners.

SONEB will finance investments for maintenance and rehabilitation of electromechanical installations with its own financial resources. Therefore, it is planned to improve the self-financing of SONEB through an appropriate tariff system and other measures.

Sanitation In order to achieve the MDGs concerning sanitation, the Ministry of Economic and Financial Development estimates that US$218 million (104 billion CFA) or US$22 million per year will be needed from 2006 to 2015.

==== Public-private partnership with small water providers in rural areas ====
A key challenge faced by water authorities is how to manage their service delivery obligations to rural communities. Even in decentralized sectors the water authorities may find it hard to provide services to remote rural communities. Benin decentralized its water services in 1999 and ownership of assets and responsibility for water provision passed to the “communes” (districts). The Direction Generale D’Eau has developed a Guide for communes in developing water services for rural areas and a suite of contractual and bidding documents to be used in the different contexts discussed in this guide. The legal framework prescribes that where there is a water post with or without network connected then the communes should delegate the provision of water to a water service provider or to the water users association.

== External cooperation ==
The 1992 demand-responsive strategy for rural water supply and sanitation (see above) has been implemented since 1993 with the strong help of external development partners in several departments. The different programs are summarized under the Assistance Program for the Development of the Water supply and Sanitation sector in Rural areas (PADEAR).

=== Danish International Development Agency (DANIDA) ===
DANIDA was the first development partner, which together with the World Bank financed the implementation of the 1992 strategy in the departments of Zou and Atlantique in 1993. Five years later, PADEAR financed by DANIDA started in the departments of Alibori and Borgou.

The Second Phase of the Water and Sanitation Sector Programme Support began in 2005 and was expected to end in 2010. The objective of the program is to reduce poverty in rural and semi-urban areas through improved water supply coverage, promotion of hygiene and basic sanitation and sustainable water resources use. The program consists of the five components sector budget support, institutional support, water supply and hygiene education, sanitation and support to the private sector. The total budget is about US$65 million (DKK 306.4 million).

=== French Development Agency ===
The French Development Agency (AFD) contributes about USD22 million (EUR13.8 million) to the program budget 2005-2008, which aims to fight poverty and to ensure improved access to water supply and sanitation. Besides a contribution to the program budget of the Collines Department, the program support includes a component to support the methodology of the program budgets for objectives (BPO) and decentralization, among others, and another component to assist the definition of a sustainable administration policy of rural water supply schemes.

=== Germany ===
The German development partners Deutsche Gesellschaft für Technische Zusammenarbeit (GTZ) and German Development Bank (KfW) financed PADEAR in the departments of Oueme and Mono in 1996. Since 2001, they also financed PADEAR in five municipalities of the Atakora Department and two municipalities of the Donga Department. In addition, the German development cooperation supports urban water supply through SONEB and its regional branches.

=== The Netherlands ===
Thanks to the Netherlands' support, more than 300,000 people were provided with new water points. From 2007 to 2011, the Netherlands finance a program to improve rural water supply and sanitation. The national government of Benin also received funds for the implementation of a hand washing campaign. In addition, the gradual implementation of decentralization to local institutions and municipalities is supported.

=== World Bank ===
Since 2003, the World Bank has supported the Republic of Benin through Poverty Reduction Support Credits (PRSCs). The first (2004–2005) and the second (2005–2006) PRSCs, which together provided US$50 million were both designed to help the implementation of the 2002 Poverty Reduction Strategy Paper and included support for improving water supply.

Second Decentralized City Management Together with the French Development Agency, the World Bank contributes to the Second Decentralized City Management program, which started in 2005 and is expected to end in 2010. The program's objective is to increase access to infrastructure and basic services in the Beninese cities of Cotonou, Porto-Novo, Parakou, Abomey-Calavi, Kandi and Lokossa. Under the program, basic infrastructure including sewerage is rehabilitated and/or constructed. Community participation and integration is supported, in particular in poor neighborhoods.

Water and Sanitation Program The World Bank's multi-donor partnership Water and Sanitation Program (WSP) is active in Benin and has established a country presence in 2004. The activities focus on the implementation of a strategy to reach the MDGs, in particular in rural areas, where the WSP supports the development and implementation of a communication action plan and a maintenance pilot project. Together with other development partners, the WSP seeks to introduce a strategy for urban water supply and sanitation. In addition, the WSP helps to develop a national hand washing initiative. The WSP works in a close partnership with the World Bank's Water and Urban Unit - West Africa and national development agencies.
