= Le Guide du Dahomey =

Newspaper (1920–1922)

Le Guide du Dahomey was a short-lived but influential newspaper in Dahomey. The paper was published weekly from Cotonou between 1920 and 1922 over 88 issues under the editorship of Dorothée Lima and Jean Adjovi. Its critical tone and regular production paved the way for the expansion of Dahomean media from the 1920s onwards.

== See also ==
- La Voix du Dahomey
- List of newspapers in Benin
