= La Nation (Benin) =

Benin newspaper

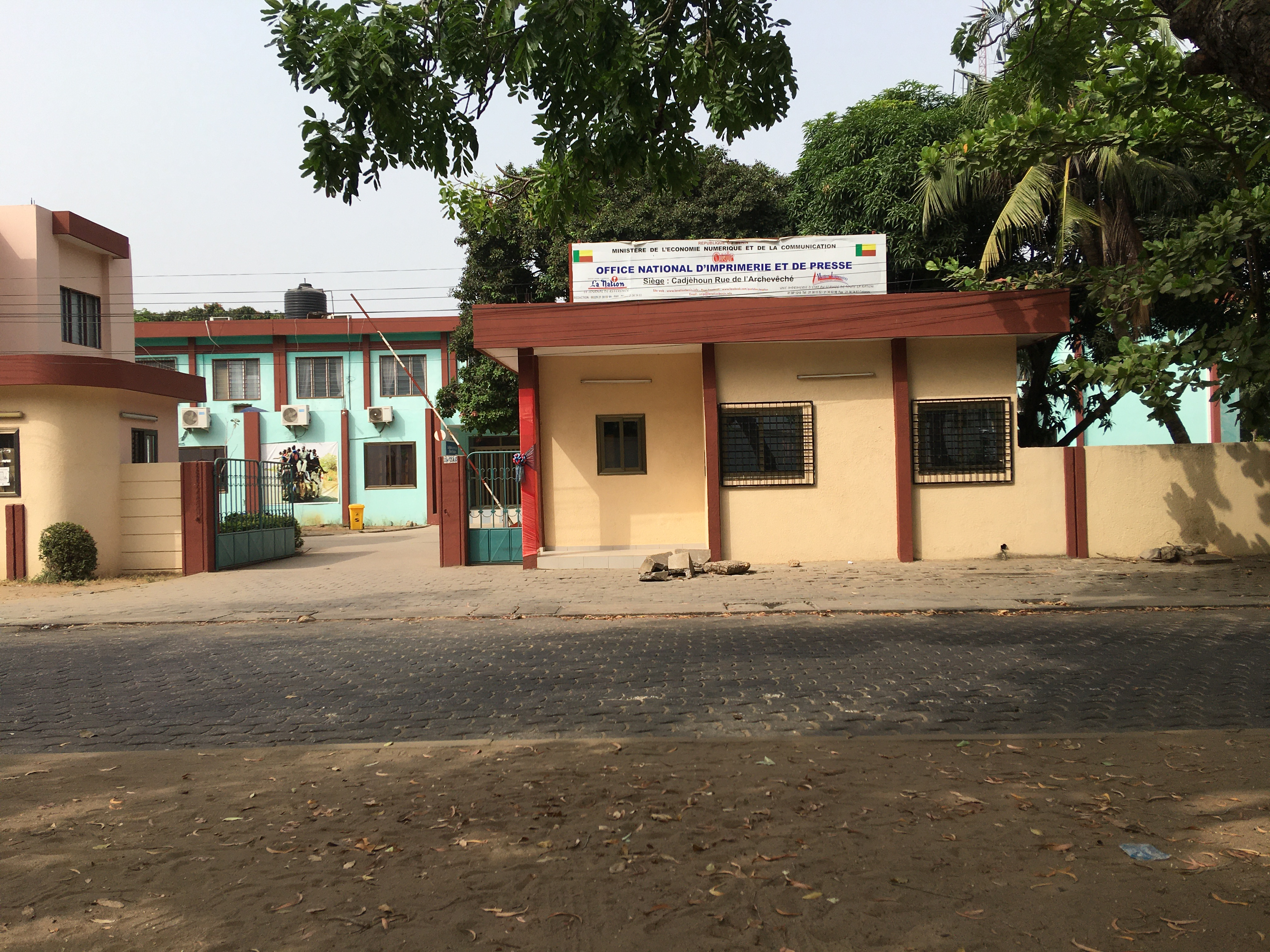
Entrance to the headquarters of the Beninese newspaper 'La Nation' and ONIP in Cotonou, Benin

La Nation is the government-owned newspaper of Benin. It was renamed from Ehuzu during the transition to democracy in Benin.

== See also ==
- List of newspapers in Benin
