= Noël Koumba Koussey =

Beninois politician and diplomat

Noël Koumba Koussey is a Beninois politician and diplomat.

== Biography ==
An opponent of the Kérékou regime, he participated in the struggles for multi-party democracy in Benin. In 1990 he was a member of the politburo of the Communist Party of Dahomey (from 1993, the Communist Party of Benin CPB). In the 1995 general election, he was elected as a representative of the CPB and served as a Deputy in the National Assembly from April 1995 to April 1999.

He served as ambassador to Niger, with additional jurisdiction for Mali and Burkina Faso, until August 2020.
