= List of newspapers in Benin =

This is an incomplete list of newspapers published in colonial Dahomey and modern Benin, ordered by date of establishment (where known).

== Colonial era ==
- L'Echo du Dahomey - established 1905
- Recadaire de Behanzin - established 1915
- Le Guide du Dahomey - 1920-22
- Le Messager Dahoméan - established 1920
- La Voix du Dahomey - 1927-1950s
- Le Phare du Dahomey - established 1929
- La Presse Porto-Novienne - 1931 to date
- La Revue Porto-Novoienne, La Quinzaine Dahoméennee - established 1932
- L'Etoile du Dahomey - established 1932
- L'Echo des Cercles du Dahomey - established 1933
- La Dépeche Dahoméenne - established 1938

== Modern Benin ==
- La Nation - formerly Ehuzu
- La Nouvelle Tribune
- Décryptage

== See also ==
- Media of Benin
- List of radio stations in Africa: Benin

== Bibliography ==
- W. Joseph Campbell (1998). Emergent Independent Press in Benin and Côte D'Ivoire. Praeger Publishers. ISBN 978-0-275-96309-5.
- "Benin: Directory: the Press". Africa South of the Sahara 2004. Regional Surveys of the World. Europa Publications. 2004. p. 84+. ISBN 1857431839.
