= Ganvie =

- Village
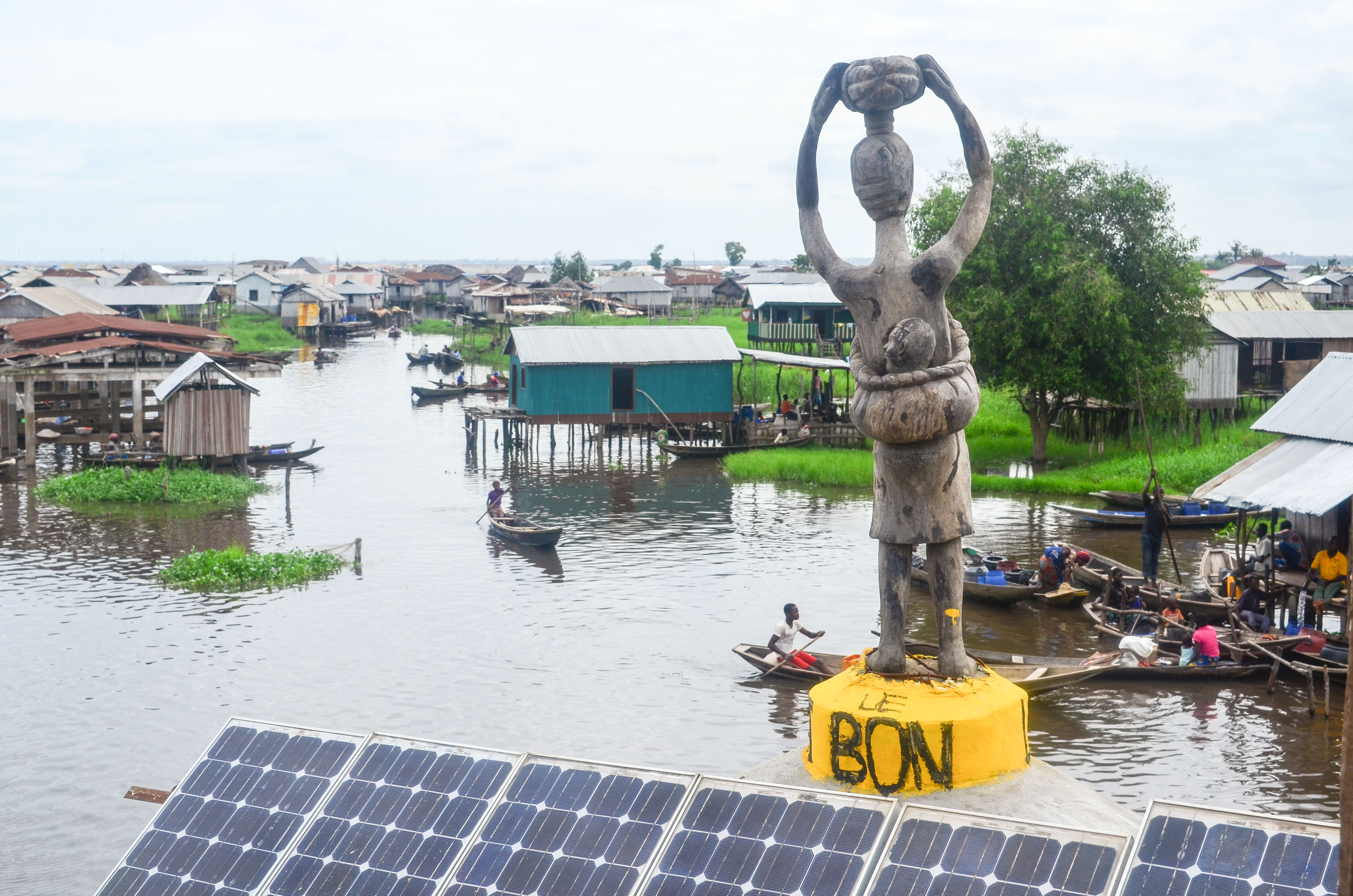

- Location in Benin
- Coordinates: 6°28′N 2°25′E
- Country: Benin
- Department: Atlantique Department
- Time zone: UTC+1 (WAT)

Ganvie is a lake village in Benin, Africa, lying in Lake Nokoué, near Cotonou. With a population of around 20,000 people, it is probably the largest lake village in Africa and is very popular with tourists.

The village was created in the sixteenth or seventeenth centuries by the Tofinu people who took to the lake to avoid Fon warriors who were taking people hostage to sell them to European enslavers. Making the shallow waters and islands of Lake Nokoue a haven, the Ganvie villagers are often referred to as "water men" and the area itself is often called the "Venice of Africa."

Originally based on farming, the village's main industries other than tourism are now fishing and fish farming. The only means of transportation to and from the village is through wooden boats.

The village was added to the UNESCO World Heritage Tentative List on October 31, 1996 in the Cultural category.

Ganvie, like many areas of Benin, is home to a constituent monarchy.

== Etymology ==
Early Fon people moved pursued by Aja people for slavery. They found refuge in the middle of the lake thanks to deities that protected them. Therefore the place was called 'Ganvie', "I was rescued here" in Fon language.

== Gallery ==
Boating through Ganvie

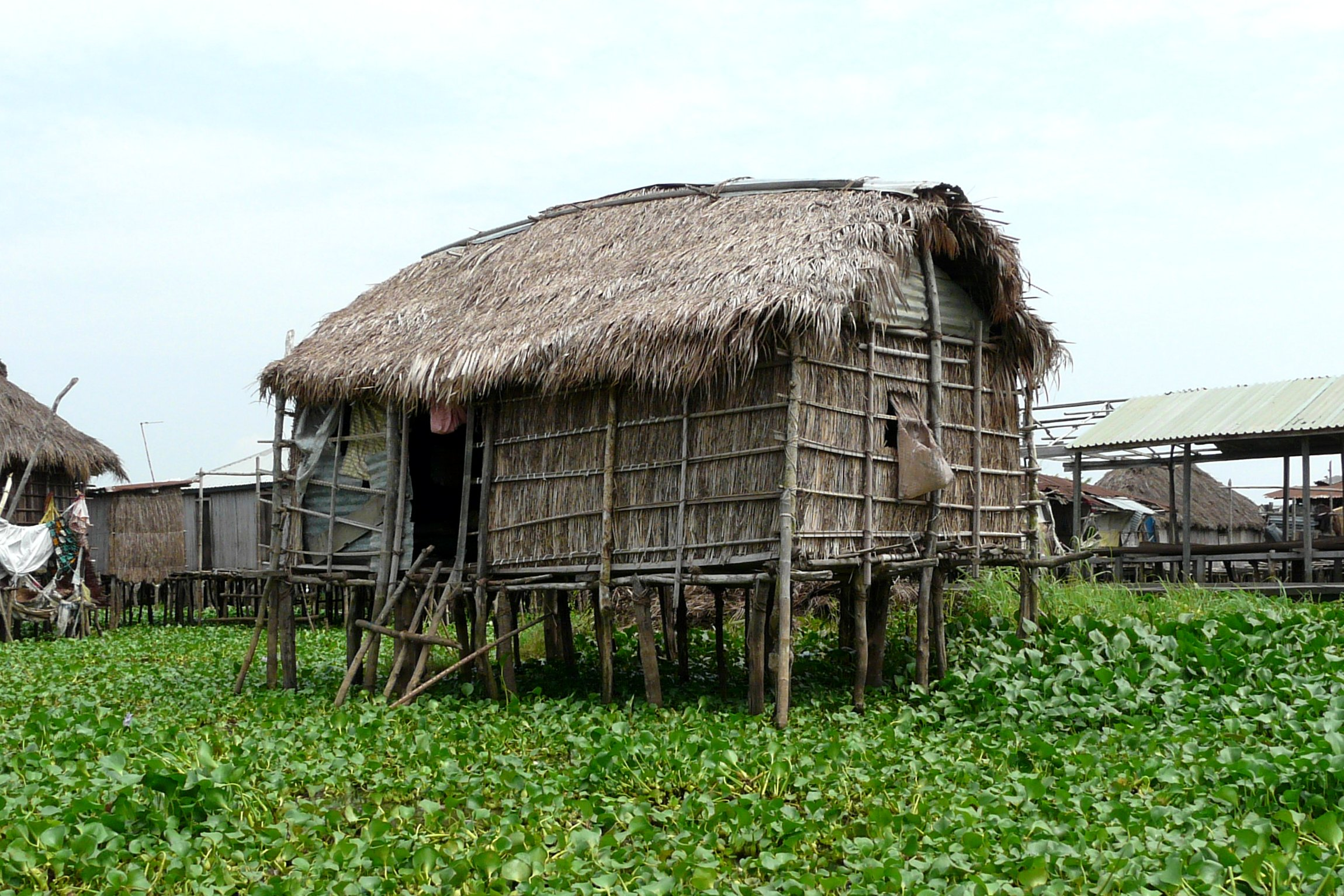
House

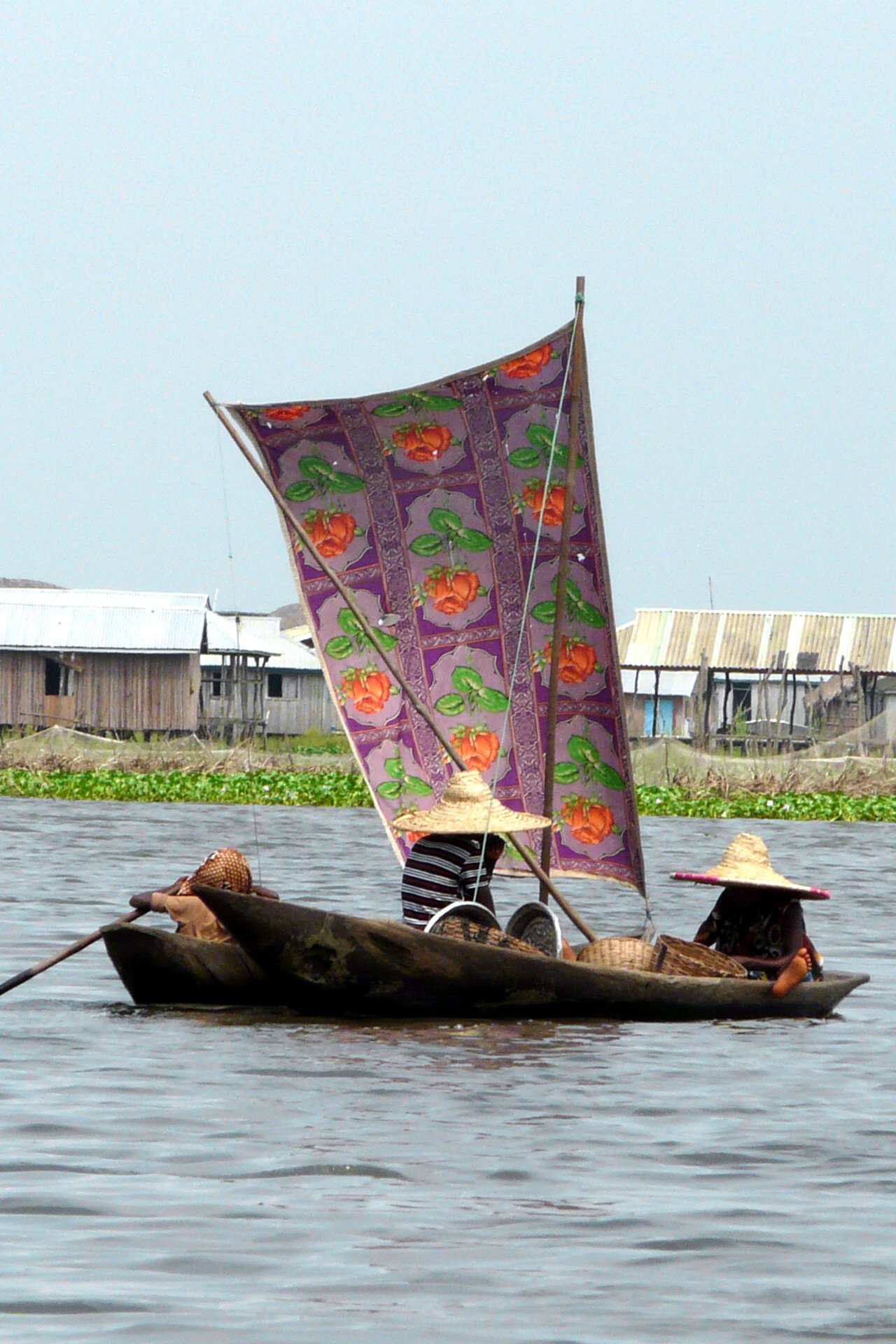
Boat

== See also ==
- Makoko
- Stilt house
