= Union for Homeland and Labour =

Political party in Benin

Union for Homeland and Labour Union pour la Patrie et le travail
- Leader: Martin Dohou Azonhiho
- Founded: September 1997
- Ideology: Socialism
- Political position: Left-wing

Union for Homeland and Labour (French: Union pour la Patrie et le travail, UPT) is a left-wing political party in Benin. Its president is Col. Martin Dohou Azonhiho, who was a leading ideologist of Mathieu Kérékou's socialist government in the 1980s. UPT supported former president Kérékou.

Together with five other parties, the UPT formed a coalition called the Acting Forces of Change in February 2009; this coalition was intended to support President Yayi Boni.
