= Aero Benin =

Airline of Benin

IATA	ICAO	Call sign
EM	AEB	AEROBEN
- Founded: 2002
- Ceased operations: July 2012 (inactive since)
- Hubs: Brazzaville (Congo) - Maya-Maya airport
- Secondary hubs: Cotonou, Ouagadoudou
- Destinations: Bamako, Cotonou, Ouagadoudou, Pointe Noire, Brazzaville
- Headquarters: Bamako
- Website: Does not have a website

Aero Benin was an airline, based in Benin but registered in Germany, which carried out land and sea freight as well as passenger services. As of 8 April 2009 it is banned within the European Union and as of July 2012, it is inactive.

== Fleet ==
Aero Benin appeared not to have had a fleet of their own, rather they code-shared with Boeing 727 aircraft (and Boeing 737 aircraft for flights between N'Djamena and Cotonou)

== Destinations ==
Aero Benin flew the following routes:

Brazzaville-

- Cotonou
- Johannesburg
- Libreville
- N'Djamena

Cotonou-

- Libreville
- Brazzaville
- Senou

Johannesburg-

- Brazzaville

Libreville-

- Brazzaville
- Cotonou

N'Djamena-

- Cotonou

Senou-

- Cotonou
