= Martin Azonhiho =

Beninese politician

Col. Martin Dohou Azonhiho was a Beninese politician, native of Abomey. He was a confrontational, much-feared, and ultra-radical minister of information and ideologue in the leftist government of Mathieu Kérékou from 1974 to 1982. He is said to have played a part in the 1975 assassination of his primary rival within the government, Maj. Michel Aikpé.

After his demotion, he served in a series of provincial posts and junior ministerial assignments. After political liberalization in the late 1980s and early 1990s, he briefly rejoined the cabinet and registered his own political party, the Union for Homeland and Labour (UPT), in September 1997.

Following the resignation of Pierre Osho, Azonhiho was appointed Minister of State for Defense on January 27, 2006. After newly elected president Yayi Boni took office on April 6, Azonhiho was replaced by Issifou Koguidro.

== Quote ==
- "If by the end of the month, Jehovah's Witnesses do not shout the revolutionary slogans, do not sing the national anthem, do not respect the flag, I am going to expel all the expatriate representatives of Jehovah's Witnesses, these licensed agents of the CIA." (16 April 1976)
