= La Presse Porto-Novienne =

French language paper in Benin

Le Presse Porto-Novienne
- Type: Weekly
- Founder: Vincent Moreira Pinto
- Founded: 1931
- Language: French/Yoruba
- Headquarters: Porto-Novo

La Presse Porto-Novienne ('Porto-Novo Press') was a French language weekly republican socialist newspaper published from Porto-Novo, Dahomey (present-day Benin). The newspaper was founded in 1931 by Vincent Moreira Pinto. It carried subtitles in Yoruba language, and had a Yoruba language section (one of very few newspapers at the time to include material in an African language).

La Presse Porto-Novienne had an edgy, militant evocation of journalism. It was denied government subsidies, as it was branded as 'extremist'.

== See also ==
- List of newspapers in Benin
