= Mineral industry of Benin =

The mineral industry, which is limited to the production of cement, clay, gold, sand, and gravel, does not play a significant role in the Benin's economy.

Cement was produced by Ciments du Benin S.A., Société des Ciments d’Onigbolo, and Société des Ciments du Benin. These companies had a combined cement production capacity of 1.43 million metric tons per year (Mt/yr). Gold was produced by artisanal miners from gold veins near the villages of Kwatena and Tchantangou, in the Atakora Mountains in northwestern Benin, and from alluvial sediments along the Perma River and its tributaries.

Benin ceased petroleum production from its Seme oilfield in 1998; however, at least one company, Kosmos Energy LLC of the United States, explored for petroleum in 2006. Kosmos, through its subsidiary Kosmos Energy Benin HC, had a 40% working interest in an exploration license for Block 4, which is located about 30 kilometers (km) offshore Benin. Kosmos’ venture partners were Kerr-McGee Benin Consortium S.A. (an affiliate of Kerr-McGee Corporation of the United States) (40%) and Petronas Carigali Overseas Sdn Bhd of Malaysia (20%). In 2006, the partners conducted a 1,472-square-kilometer (km2) three-dimensional (3D) seismic survey of the Block’s most prospective areas and were in the process of interpreting and reprocessing existing 3D seismic data.
