= La Voix du Dahomey =

La Voix du Dahomey was a newspaper that was important in attempting to resist French colonial rule in Dahomey. The paper was published fortnightly between 1927 and the 1950s with an early circulation of only about 2000 but with a much larger readership and influence. Criticism of France was hidden beneath effusive protestations of loyalty to Paris. In 1936, the editors and directors of the paper were brought before a court by the colonial powers.

The editor of the paper was José Firmino Santos.

== See also ==
- Le Guide du Dahomey
- List of newspapers in Benin
