= Coat of arms of Benin =

Versions
- Lesser version
- Armiger: Republic of Benin
- Adopted: 1990 (1964)
- Crest: Two cornucopias sable, ears of corn coming therefrom;
- Shield: Quarterly,1, Argent, a Somba Castle Or, 2, Argent, a Star of Benin proper, 3, Argent, a Palm Tree vert charged with fruit gules, 4, Argent, a ship sable sailing on a sea azure with a sewn upon the line of quartering a lozenge gules
- Supporters: Two panthers or spotted
- Motto: Fraternité, Justice, Travail "Fraternity, Justice, Labour"

The coat of arms or national seal of Benin, originally introduced in 1964, was readopted in 1990 after being replaced in 1975.

At the top of the emblem is the national crest that consists of two horns with corn in the ear and filled with sand. These are reputed to stand for prosperity. Below the crest is a shield that contains the actual coat of arms of Benin.

The shield is broken into four quadrants. The top left quadrant contains a castle in the style of the Somba, representative of the history of Benin. In the top right quadrant, is the Star of Benin, the highest award of the nation. Below this is a ship, that stands for the arrival of Europeans in Benin. In the lower left quadrant is a palm tree.

The shield is supported by a pair of leopards, the national animal of Benin. Below the shield is the motto of Benin (Fraternity, Justice, Labour) in French.

== Official description ==
The constitution of Benin puts for the blazon of the coat of arms as follows:

- Quarterly,
1. In the first quarter a Somba castle or;
2. In the second argent the Star of Benin proper, which is a Maltese cross azure, anglé of rays argent and in fess point sable;
3. In the third quarter argent a palm tree vert charged with a fruit gules;
4. In the fourth quarter argent a ship sable sailing on a sea azure with a sewn upon the line of quartering a lozenge gules
- Supporters: two panthers or spotted;
- Above the shield: two cornucopias sable, ears of corn coming therefrom;
- Motto: Fraternité - Justice - Travail in letters sable on a scroll.

== People's Republic of Benin (1975–1990) ==
Coat of arms of the People's Republic of Benin (1975–1990).

In 1975, the People's Republic of Benin (as the country was then known – see history of Benin for more details) adopted a new coat of arms which reflected the country's adherence to Marxism–Leninism. The symbolism of the flag was as follows:

- Green symbolized the nature of the country
- The red star symbolized socialism
- The corn cobs represented agriculture and farmers
- The cog-wheel represented industry and the working class

The coat of arms also featured the initials of the country: RPB (French: République populaire du Bénin).

== Gallery ==
Royal coat of arms of King Béhanzin of Dahomey (c. 1890–1894)

Coat of arms of French Dahomey (the end of the 19th century–1958)

Coat of arms of the Republic of Dahomey (1958–1964)
