= Communist Party of Benin =

Political party in Benin

Communist Party of Benin Parti Communiste du Bénin
- Abbreviation: PCB
- First Secretary: Philippe Noudjenoume
- Founder: Pascal Fantodji
- Founded: 1977
- Preceded by: Union of Communists of Dahomey
- Headquarters: Porto-Novo
- Newspaper: La Flamme
- Ideology: Communism; Marxism–Leninism; Stalinism; Hoxhaism; Anti-revisionism
- Political position: Far-left
- International affiliation: ICMLPO

Website
- www.la-flamme.org

The Communist Party of Benin (French: Parti Communiste du Bénin) is an anti-revisionist Marxist–Leninist communist party in Benin. PCB was founded in 1977 by the Union of Communists of Dahomey. The party was initially called Communist Party of Dahomey (Parti Communiste du Dahomey). The first secretary of the party is Philippe Noudjenoume. PCB publishes La Flamme.

PCB was an illegal party, working in a clandestine manner against the Kérékou regime, and was only legally recognized on September 17, 1993.

During the Cold War, the party was pro-Albanian. PCB is associated with the International Conference of Marxist–Leninist Parties and Organizations (Unity & Struggle).

In the legislative elections of 1995, Noël Koumba Koussey was to the National Assembly for the PCB.

In the 1996 presidential elections, PCB candidate Pascal Fantodji got 17,977 votes (1.08%).

In 1998, Magloire Yansunnu was expelled. In 1999, Yansunnu formed the Marxist–Leninist Communist Party of Benin.

== See also ==
- List of anti-revisionist groups
