= Union for the Nation =

Political party in Benin

Union for the Nation (French: Union pour la Nation) is a political party in Benin. The general secretary of the party (as of 2000) is Alexandre Hountondji.
