= List of governors of São João Baptista de Ajudá =

This article lists the governors of Fort of São João Baptista de Ajudá (1680–1961), former Portuguese colonial fort located in the city of Ouidah, in the present day nation of Benin.

== List ==
Tenure	Incumbent	Notes
1680 to ????	Jacinto de Figueiredo e Abreu, Governor	Governor of Portuguese São Tomé and Príncipe authorized to erect a fort in the city of Hweda
17?? to ????	Abandoned	
1721 to 1730	Re-foundation of the fort as São João Baptista de Ajudá, under the Portuguese colony of Brazil	
1721 to 1730	Francisco Pereira Mendes, Governor	
1730	Under Companhia de Cacheu e Cabo Verde	
1730 to 1732	Francisco Pereira Mendes, Governor	
17?? to 1736	Manuel Correia da Cunha, Governor	
17?? to 1743	João Basílio, Governor	
17?? to 1746	Martinho de Cunha Barbosa, interim Governor	
1746 to 1746	Francisco Nunes Pereira, Governor	Usurper
1746 to 1746	Francisco do Espírito Santo, interim Governor	
1746 to 17??	Filipe José de Gouveia, Governor	
17?? to 1752	..., Governor	
1752 to 1759	Teodósio Rodrigues da Costa, Governor	
1759 to 1760	António Nunes de Gouveia, interim Governor	
1760 to 17??	Félix José de Gouveia, Governor	
17?? to 1790	..., Governor	
1790 to 1797	Francisco António da Fonseca e Aragão	
April 1797 to ????	Manuel Bastos Varela Pinto Pacheco	
???? to 1817	..., Governor	
1817 to 18??	Francisco Félix de Sousa, Governor	1st Term
1844 to 1845	Joaquim José Libânio, Governor	
1839 to 1845	..., Governor	
1845 to 1847/1848	Francisco Félix de Sousa, Governor	2nd Term
1849 to 18??	Quaresma, Governor	
1851 to 1851	Alferes Elerpech, Governor	
1851 to 8 May 1858	Isidoro Félix de Sousa, subordinate Governor	
1852 to 1853	João Justino da Costa, Governor	
1853 to 1858	José Pinheiro de Sousa, Governor	
1858 to 1858	Francisco Félix de Sousa, Governor	3rd Term
1858 to 1861	Abandoned	
1861 to 1865	Ceded to French missionaries by the rulers of Dahomey	
23 February 1865	Reclaimed by Portugal, under the governors of Portuguese São Tomé and Príncipe	
1865 to 1868	José Maria Borges de Sequeira, Governor	
1868 to 1869	Vital de Bettencourt de Vasconcellos Côrte-Real do Canto, Governor	
1869 to ?1872	Abandoned	
?1872 to 187?	António Joaquim, Governor	
187? to 1878	Augusto Frutuoso de Figueiredo de Barros, Governor	
1878 to 1879	Lourenço da Rocha, Governor	
1879 to 1881	Lieutenant António José Machado, Governor	
1881 to 1883	..., Governor	
1883 to 1885	Lieutenant Fernando Gonçalves, Governor	
1885 to 1885	Bernardo Francisco Luís da Cruz, Governor	
1885 to 1885	Lieutenant José Gomes de Sousa, Governor	
1885 to 1886	Lieutenant Francisco Rego, Governor	
1886 to 1887	Major António Domingues Cortez da Silva Curado, Governor	
1887 to 1888	Manuel Francisco Rodrigues Guimarães, Governor	
1888 to 1888	Captain Vicente da Rosa Rolim, Governor	1st Term
1888 to 1890	Manuel José Ferreira dos Santos, Governor	1st Term
1890 to 1890	Carolino Acácio Cordeiro, Governor	
1890 to 1893	Captain Vicente da Rosa Rolim	2nd Term
1893 to 189?	Manuel José Ferreira dos Santos, Governor	2nd Term
1897 to 1898	Lieutenant ...Campos, Governor	
1898 to ????	Lieutenant ... Nunes de Aguiar, Governor	
1900 to 19??	Lieutenant António Mendes da Costa, Governor	
19?? to 1905	Lieutenant João de Deus Pires, Governor	
1905 to 1906	Joaquim Luís de Carvalho, Governor	
1906 to 1909	..., Governor	
1909 to 1911	Sebastião Lousada, Governor	
1911 to 1911	Cândido João de Barros, Governor	
1911 to 1912	Guilherme Spínola de Melo, Governor	
1912 to 19??	..., Governor	
19?? to 1928	Lieutenant Viriato Henrique dos Anjos Garcez, Governor	
1928 to 1931	Captain Joaquim Sinel de Cordes, Governor	
1932 to 1938	Captain Miguel Maria Pupo Correia, Governor	1st Term
1938 to 1941	Captain José Pimenta Segurado de Avelar Machado, Governor	
1941 to 1942	Jean-Louis Bourjac, Governor	Self-proclaimed; not recognized by Portugal
1942 to 1944	José de Vasconcelos e Sá Guerreiro Nuno, interim Governor	1st Term
1944 to 1946	Captain Carlos Alberto de Serpa Soares, Governor	
1946 to 1946	José de Vasconcelos e Sá Guerreiro Nuno, Governor	2nd Term
1946 to 1951	Captain Miguel Maria Pupo Correia, Governor	2nd Term
1951 to 1954	António João Teles Pereira de Vasconcelos, Administrator	
1954 to 1956	Ernesto António Pereira Enes, Administrator	
1956 to 1 August 1961	António Agostinho Saraiva Borges, Intendant	
1 August 1961	Annexed by the Republic of Dahomey	
1975	Annexation recognized by Portugal	

== See also ==
- History of Benin
- French Dahomey
  - List of colonial governors of Dahomey
- List of presidents of Benin
- List of prime ministers of Benin

== Sources ==
- http://www.vdiest.nl/Africa/benin.htm
- https://web.archive.org/web/20050131222928/http://www.geocities.com/CapitolHill/Rotunda/2209/Sao_Joao_Baptista.html
