= List of ecoregions in Benin =

The following is a list of ecoregions in Benin, according to the Worldwide Fund for Nature (WWF).

== Terrestrial ecoregions ==
=== Tropical and subtropical moist broadleaf forests ===
- Eastern Guinean forests
- Nigerian lowland forests

=== Tropical and subtropical grasslands, savannas, and shrublands ===
- Guinean forest–savanna mosaic
- West Sudanian savanna

== Freshwater ecoregions ==
=== Nilo-Sudan ===
- Bight Coastal
- Lower Niger-Benue
