= Pascal Fantodji =

Beninese politician (died 2010)

Pascal Fantodji (died 5 April 2010) was a Beninese professor and founder of the Communist Party of Benin (PCB). In the Benin presidential election of 1996, Fantodji received 1.08 percent of the vote (failing to qualify for the second round).
