= General Confederation of the Workers of Benin =

Trade union centre in Benin

CGTB
- General Confederation of the Workers of Benin
- Confédération Générale des Travaillaurs du Bénin
- Headquarters: Cotonou, Benin
- Location: Benin
- Key people: Pascal Todjinou, secretary general
- Affiliations: ITUC

The General Confederation of the Workers of Benin (CGTB) is a trade union centre in Benin. It is affiliated with the International Trade Union Confederation.

== See also ==
- Trade unions in Benin
