= Union of Communists of Dahomey =

Union of Communists of Dahomey Union des communistes du Dahomey
- Founded: 1976
- Dissolved: 1977
- Succeeded by: Communist Party of Dahomey
- Ideology: Communism; Marxism-Leninism; Hoxhaism; Anti-revisionism
- Political position: Far-left

The Union of Communists of Dahomey (French: Union des communistes du Dahomey) was a communist party in Benin. UCD was founded in 1976. In 1977 UCD gave birth to the Communist Party of Dahomey.

== See also ==
- List of anti-revisionist groups
