= Hugues Comlan Sossoukpè =

Beninese journalist

- Citizenship: Benin
- Occupation: Journalist
- Employer: Olofofo
- Criminal charges: Inciting rebellion Inciting hatred and violence Harassment through electronic communication Apologising for terrorism

Hugues Comlan Sossoukpè is a Beninese journalist and human rights activist. The director of the online investigative outlet Olofofo, he formerly served as the secretary general of the Beninese Association of Web Activists. A refugee in Togo since 2021, in 2025 Sossoukpè was abducted from Côte d'Ivoire and extradited to Benin on terrorism charges which have been criticised by human rights organisations.

== Career ==
Sossoukpè was known for using social media to promote his activism, with 69, 000 followers on Facebook. He went on to establish his own online news outlet, Olofofo, and served for a time as the secretary general of the Beninese Association of Web Activists. Sossoukpè often wrote articles denouncing government scandals, and in particular the President of Benin, Patrice Talon. In 2019, after criticising the results of parliamentary elections, Sossoukpè fled to Togo, where he received refugee status in 2021. Olofofo was formally banned by Beninese authorities in March 2025.

== Arrest and extradition ==
On 8 July 2025, Sossoukpè travelled from Togo to Abidjan, Côte d'Ivoire, where he was invited to attend the inaugural Ivoire Tech Forum by Rockya Fofana, the deputy chief of staff of the Ministry of Digital Transition and Digitisation as a "recognised journalist in the sub-region". Overnight on 10 and 11 July, Sossoukpè was arrested in his hotel room and transported directly to Félix Houphouët-Boigny International Airport, where he was extradited via a chartered plane to Cotonou, Benin. Later on 11 July, he was reported missing by family members who had been unable to contact him. Initial media reports erroneously reported that he had been arrested in Togo.

Local media in Benin reported that Sossoukpè had been presented before the Court for the Repression of Economic Offences and Terrorism on 11 July before being detained at a prison in Ouidah, though this was not initially confirmed by either Beninese or Ivorian authorities. Banouto also reported that an international arrest warrant had been issued for Sossoukpè by the Beninese judiciary. Sossoukpè made a further court appearance on 14 July, with his lawyers confirming that he had been charged with inciting rebellion; inciting hatred and violence; harassment through electronic communication; and apologising for terrorism. A Judge for Liberty and Detention remanded Sossoukpè for the duration of the investigation in Ouidah.

In September 2025, Reporters Without Borders reported that Ali Moumouni, an Olofofo contributor and colleague of Sossoukpè's, had been detained since 16 July, a week after Sossoukpè's arrest. He remains in pre-trial detention as of October 2025.

On 19 December 2025, the President of the Investigation Commission of the Court for the Suppression of Economic Offences and Terrorism published an avis aux avocats stating that a hearing would be held in respect of Sossoukpè's case on 26 December.

=== Response ===
Sossoukpè's legal team argued that he should not have been extradited to Benin due to his status as a refugee in Togo, and argued due process had not been followed as he had not been presented before an Ivorian magistrate before being extradited from Côte d'Ivoire. The Beninese College of Lawyers, which included members of Sossoukpè's legal team, denounced his arrest as an abuse of procedure.

The Union of Journalists for African Free Press issued a statement on 12 July 2025 expressing concern about news of Sossoukpè's arrest and called on Ivorian and Beninese authorities to confirm his current status and what charges had been made against him. Later that day, a Beninese government spokesperson confirmed for the first time that Sossoukpè had been extradited from Côte d'Ivoire and had been presented before the police, special prosecutor, and judges.

Human rights organisations criticised Sossoukpè's extradition. Front Line Defenders expressed concern that his detention was due to his human rights activism. The West African Network of Human Rights Defenders called on the Ivorian government to respect the 1951 Geneva Convention by offering to protection to Sossoukpè due to his status as a refugee.

In Côte d'Ivoire, media outlets including Le Nouveau Reporter criticised the decision of the Ivorian government to extradite a refugee journalist to their country of origin, particularly given Benin's human right record. The Committee to Protect Journalists called on Beninese authorities to release Sossoukpè; the International Federation of Journalists condemned his arrest and extradition as violating international protocols on the rights of the refugees.

On 24 July 2025, the Ivorian government released its first statement on Sossoukpè's extradition; Minister of Communication Amadou Coulibaly stated the country had exercised the warrant in the "normal course of judicial cooperation between our two countries". Coulibaly also said that the Ivorian government had not been aware of Sossoukpè's status as a refugee.

In 2026, Reporters Without Borders referred Sossoukpè's case to the Court of Justice of ECOWAS, citing the actions of the Beninese and Ivorian authorities as "serious violations of the law". In July 2026, a group of 50 West African journalists launched a call for his release to mark a year since his arrest. On 6 August 2026, Sossoukpè's lawyer filed an application for provisional release, which was denied on 24 August.

On 30 September 2026, Reporters Without Borders visited Sossoukpè at the civil prison in Ouidah. It subsequently released a statement raising concerns about the conditions he was confined in, including lacking a refrigerator, a television or a radio; not receiving follow-up medical treatment to manage asthma and eye problems; and visitation remaining limited.
