= Michel Aikpé =

Former minister in Benin

Michel Aikpé (1942 – 20 June 1975) was the Minister of Interior of Benin Republic and second in command in the first government of Mathieu Kérékou, from 1972 to 1975. He was assassinated in 1975 by Martin Dohou Azonhiho under instruction from President Mathieu Kérékou for having political ambitions but the official reason was that he was having an affair with Kérékou's wife. He hailed from Abomey, the historical capital of Benin Republic. Aikpé was a member of the military junta who, along with Janvier Assogba, Michel Alladaye, toppled the civilian government headed by President Justin Ahomadégbé-Tomêtin in 1972. The Junta then handed power to Major Mathieu Kérékou in 1972.
