= Marxist–Leninist Communist Party of Benin =

Political party in Benin

Marxist-Leninist Communist Party of Benin Parti communiste marxiste-léniniste du Bénin
- Founder: Magloire Yansunnu
- Founded: 1999
- Banned: 2019
- Split from: PCB
- Headquarters: Cotonou
- Ideology: Communism; Marxism-Leninism; Hoxhaism; Anti-revisionism
- Political position: Far-left

The Marxist–Leninist Communist Party of Benin (French: Parti communiste marxiste-léniniste du Bénin) is a Marxist-Leninist and Hoxhaist party in Benin led by Magloire Yansunnu. PCMLB was founded in Cotonou February 20, 1999. Yansunnu had been expelled from the Communist Party of Benin in 1998 following an internal schism in that party.

PCMLB was the 112th political party to be legally registered in Benin.

== See also ==
- List of anti-revisionist groups
