= Pierre Osho =

Beninese politician

Pierre Osho (born May 5, 1945) is a Beninese politician. He was the Minister of Foreign Affairs of Benin from April 1996 to May 1998, then Minister of Defense from May 1998 to January 2006, when he resigned.

Osho submitted his resignation to President Mathieu Kérékou on January 11, 2006, and was succeeded as Defense Minister by Martin Dohou Azonhiho later in the month.
