= .bj =

Top-level Internet domain for Benin

- Introduced: 18 January 1996
- TLD type: Country code top-level domain
- Status: Active
- Registry: Network Information Center – Benin
- Sponsor: Autorité de Régulation des Communications Électroniques et de la Poste (Benin)
- Intended use: Entities connected with Benin
- Actual use: Gets a little bit of use in Benin
- Registration restrictions: Need administrative contact in Benin
- Structure: Registrations are available directly at the second level, or at third level beneath some second-level labels
- DNSSEC: Yes
- Registry website: www.nic.bj

.bj is the Internet country code top-level domain (ccTLD) for Benin administered by the ARCEP Benin.

== History ==
The .bj ccTLD was registered on 18 January 1996.

== Naming ==
Despite having no "j" in its name in any of its official languages, Benin was allocated .bj as the other possible codes .be, .bn, and .bi had already been allocated to other entities.

== Structure ==
Registrations are possible at second level as well as a number of third level domains.

List of third level domains
Third level domain	Intended purpose
.com.bj	Businesses
.org.bj	NGOs, non-profits and associations
.tourism.bj	Entities related to tourism
.info.bj	Printed or audiovisual media
.edu.bj	Primary and secondary educational institutions
.univ.bj	Universities
.assur.bj	Insurance companies
.net.bj	Telecommunication and network companies
.architectes.bj	Architects
.avocats.bj	Lawyers
.resto.bj	Restaurants
.restaurant.bj	Restaurants
.gouv.bj	Governments and related entities
.loisirs.bj	Hobbies and leisure
.agro.bj	Agriculture
.econo.bj	Finance and economy
.eco.bj	Environmental
.santé.bj	Health related
.hotels.bj	Hotels

Alphanumeric terms made up of letters of the French alphabet from A to Z, digits from 0 to 9, and hyphens are allowed in domain names.

Domain names that are composed of a single character, are composed of two letters only, or begin or end with a hyphen cannot be registered.

== See also ==
- Telecommunications in Benin
- Republic of Dahomey
