= Human rights in Benin =

The human-rights situation in Benin is considered to be generally above average for sub-Saharan Africa.

A 2012 U.S. report commended Benin "for continuing the transition to democracy" and applauded "the legislative work of recent years to pass and enforce laws regarding domestic violence against women, official corruption, torture, and other crimes", as well as "the establishment of human rights institutions including the human rights Ombudsman and the National Council for the Promotion of Gender Equity and Equality".

The report expressed continued concern, however, "about continuing reports of high levels of violence and abuse by security services, including the police, as well as harsh prison conditions and long pre-trial detention periods", as well as "by reports of serious restrictions on the right to strike in the public sector and authorities' frequent anti-union statements, fueling social tensions and protest actions". In addition, the report noted "the government's slow progress in addressing the worst forms of child labor".

== Historical background ==
Historical ratings
Year	Political rights	Civil liberties	Status	President^{2}
1972	7	5	Not Free	Mathieu Kérékou
1973	7	5	Not Free	Mathieu Kérékou
1974	7	6	Not Free	Mathieu Kérékou
1975	7	7	Not Free	Mathieu Kérékou
1976	7	7	Not Free	Mathieu Kérékou
1977	7	7	Not Free	Mathieu Kérékou
1978	7	7	Not Free	Mathieu Kérékou
1979	7	6	Not Free	Mathieu Kérékou
1980	7	6	Not Free	Mathieu Kérékou
1981	7	6	Not Free	Mathieu Kérékou
1982^{3}	7	6	Not Free	Mathieu Kérékou
1983	7	6	Not Free	Mathieu Kérékou
1984	7	7	Not Free	Mathieu Kérékou
1985	7	7	Not Free	Mathieu Kérékou
1986	7	7	Not Free	Mathieu Kérékou
1987	7	7	Not Free	Mathieu Kérékou
1988	7	7	Not Free	Mathieu Kérékou
1989	7	7	Not Free	Mathieu Kérékou
1990	6	4	Partly Free	Mathieu Kérékou
1991	2	3	Free	Nicéphore Soglo
1992	2	3	Free	Nicéphore Soglo
1993	2	3	Free	Nicéphore Soglo
1994	2	3	Free	Nicéphore Soglo
1995	2	2	Free	Nicéphore Soglo
1996	2	2	Free	Mathieu Kérékou
1997	2	2	Free	Mathieu Kérékou
1998	2	2	Free	Mathieu Kérékou
1999	2	3	Free	Mathieu Kérékou
2000	2	2	Free	Mathieu Kérékou
2001	3	2	Free	Mathieu Kérékou
2002	3	2	Free	Mathieu Kérékou
2003	2	2	Free	Mathieu Kérékou
2004	2	2	Free	Mathieu Kérékou
2005	2	2	Free	Mathieu Kérékou
2006	2	2	Free	Yayi Boni
2007	2	2	Free	Yayi Boni
2008	2	2	Free	Yayi Boni
2009	2	2	Free	Yayi Boni
2010	2	2	Free	Yayi Boni
2011	2	2	Free	Yayi Boni
2012	2	2	Free	Yayi Boni
2013	2	2	Free	Yayi Boni
2014	2	2	Free	Yayi Boni
2015	2	2	Free	Yayi Boni
2016	2	2	Free	Yayi Boni
2017	2	2	Free	Patrice Talon
2018	2	2	Free	Patrice Talon
2019	4	2	Partly Free	Patrice Talon
2020	4	2	Partly Free	Patrice Talon
2021	5	3	Partly Free	Patrice Talon
2022	5	3	Partly Free	Patrice Talon
2023	4	3	Partly Free	Patrice Talon

Benin was formerly a French colony known as Dahomey, which won its independence in 1960. From 1972 to 1990 it was a Marxist–Leninist state that was ruled by dictator Mathieu Kérékou, who took power in a coup. Under Kérékou, the country had no freedom of speech or of the press and a very poor human-rights record. It changed its name to the People's Republic of Benin in 1975. In 1990 the word "People's" was removed from the country's official name, and in December 1991 a new constitution was ratified with the goal of establishing a nation in which "the rule of law, fundamental rights, public liberties, human dignity and justice are guaranteed, protected and promoted as the prerequisite for the harmonious development of each Benin citizen".

Under the new constitution, democracy was restored in Benin in 1991. In the elections held that year, Kérékou lost to Nicéphore Soglo and accepted the results of the vote. He was returned to power in the 1996 elections and re-elected in 2001; the 2006 elections, in which Kérékou did not run, was considered free and fair.

Increasingly since 1991, Benin has been generally regarded as having considerably higher human-rights standards than most other African countries. It has been written that Benin "appears to be one of the leading democracies in Africa", but that the many human rights NGOs in the country, which date back to the transitional period, "do not network among themselves", so that "it is normal for organizations working in the same area to not know each other", resulting in a "duplication of efforts". At the 47th Ordinary Session of the African Commission on Human and Peoples' Rights in 2010, the Attorney General of Benin, Victor Topanou declared that "today there is evident political will to ensure the success of the culture of human rights", citing recent efforts to alleviate poverty through micro-credit policies, to improve access to justice by constructing of new law courts and prisons, and to increase food rations and health care in prisons.

Benin is a signatory of the following international agreements: African (Banjul) Charter on Human and People's Rights; Convention Against Torture and Other Cruel, Inhumane, or Degrading Treatment or Punishment; Convention on Elimination of All Forms of Discrimination Against Women; Convention on the Rights of the Child; International Convention on Elimination of All Forms of Racial Discrimination; International Covenant Economic, Social and Cultural Rights; and International Covenant on Civil and Political Rights.

The following is a chart of Benin's ratings since 1972 in the Freedom in the World reports, published annually by Freedom House. A rating of 1 is "free"; 7, "not free".^{1}

== Basic rights ==
Discrimination based on race, gender, disability, language, and social status is prohibited by the constitution and laws; however, women and disabled people continue to experience discrimination, and the government does little to combat it.

Although Benin's constitution and laws guarantee freedom of speech and of the press, these rights are sometimes denied. The government's Office of Radio and Television (ORTB) has supposedly restricted broadcasts that were critical of the government; the government blocked the signal of a French radio station that reported in 2010 on efforts by members of the National Assembly to impeach President Yayi; and a mass purchase, supposedly by government agents, was made of copies of newspapers that reported on a corruption case. Many journalists engage in self-censorship, and a number of them have been sued for libel, although judges tend to choose not to prosecute them. "Abuse" of the freedom of expression is punishable by imprisonment with hard labor. Still, there is an active media that is often critical of the government, although its reach is limited, partly owing to illiteracy. The most influential news media are owned by the government. Some private media receive government aid. In 2025, Hugues Comlan Sossoukpè, a journalist and human rights activist who had previously fled Benin was extradited from Ivory Coast to Benin on an international arrest warrant that was suggested to be linked to his activism and journalism.

There is an unrestricted right of access to the Internet, but it is unavailable in most places. The government does not interfere with academic or cultural activities, and generally respects the right to freedom of assembly, although it sometimes refuses permits for gatherings by opposition groups and others. In 2010, the government prohibited several public gatherings, including demonstrations by union members concerned about corruption and other issues. Benin's constitution and laws guarantee the right to move freely around the country, travel abroad, emigrate and repatriate, and these rights are generally honored, although there are checkpoints around the country that block movement and that are used by police and gendarmes to demand bribes. Although minors require documentation when traveling abroad in order to avoid trafficking, the uneven enforcement of this requirement results in continued trafficking.

In accordance with its constitution, Benin is a secular state in which religious freedom is guaranteed to all and in which public schools are not permitted to give religious instruction (although private religious schools are permitted). In Benin, where at the 2002 census the population was 27 percent Roman Catholic, 24 percent Muslim, 17 percent Voudon (Voodoo), 6 percent other indigenous faiths, and 5 percent Celestial Christian, and where the national holidays include both Christian and Muslim holy days, "respect for religious differences was widespread at all levels of society and in all regions", according to a 2011 U.S. government report, although there was "occasional conflict between Voodoo practitioners and Christians over Voodoo initiation practices, requiring intervention by police".

Corruption exists in virtually all sectors and levels of government in Benin. There is a government agency called the Watchdog to Combat Corruption, whose ostensible purpose is to address this problem.

== Women's rights ==
The state of women's rights in Benin has improved markedly since the restoration of democracy and the ratification of the Constitution, and the passage of the Personal and Family Code in 2004, both of which overrode various traditional customs that systematically treated women unequally. Still, inequality and discrimination persist. Polygamy and forced marriage are illegal but still occur. Enforcement of the law against rape, the punishment for which can be up to five years in prison, is hampered by corruption, ineffective police work, and fear of social stigma. Police incompetence results in most sexual offenses being reduced to misdemeanors. Domestic violence is widespread, with penalties of up to 3 years in prison, but women are reluctant to report cases and authorities are reluctant to intervene in what are generally considered private matters.

Female genital mutilation has been described as "the worst substantial human rights violation in Benin". About 13 percent of women and girls have been subjected to it (over 70 percent in some regions and tribes), but the law against it is rarely enforced. Prostitution, especially child prostitution, is also common, with the clients often being sex tourists. Sexual harassment is also common, with many female students being abused by their teachers. Although it is a criminal offense punishable by up to two years in prison, enforcement is slack. Local customs which are unfavorable to women no longer have the force of law in Benin, where women enjoy equal rights under the constitution, including in matters related to marriage and inheritance. Still, they experience a great deal of social and employment discrimination owing to traditional attitudes about sex roles, and have a much harder time obtaining credit and when widowed do not have the right to manage their own property. Women in rural areas play subordinate roles and do a great deal of hard labor.

Women who have experienced discrimination or abuse can seek assistance from Women in Law and Development-Benin, the Female Jurists Association of Benin (AFJB), and the Women's Justice and Empowerment Initiative through Care International's Empower Project. A 2012 U.S. report commended Benin for establishing the National Council for the Promotion of Gender Equity and Equality.

== Children's rights ==
The National Commission for Children's Rights and the Ministry of Family are charged with promoting children's rights.

Children become citizens through birth in Benin or birth to parents who are citizens of Benin. Many people's births have not been recorded, which can result in denial of education, health care, and other services. Primary school is compulsory, though many girls do not go to school. Child marriage is widespread, although marriage by children under 14 is technically illegal, with marriage of those between 14 and 17 permitted if the parents give their consent.

In accordance with tribal customs, children are often killed at birth for various reasons – for example, one of a pair of twins is killed because twins are traditionally considered witches. Children who are born prematurely or who do not cry at their birth are also considered witches. The main reason for murdering these children is that they are regarded as sources of misfortune. One report describes the infanticide as follows: "As soon as the child is born in a way considered to make them a witch or abnormal, the head of the family gives the baby to an executioner. The different techniques used to kill newborns are atrocious. The baby is often crashed against a tree before he is buried or is slaughtered. Some child witches or abnormal children are not killed. They are generally abandoned, sold, or given to a family famous for keeping such children. They keep these children not for love but to be used later on as means of exchange as a domestic slave. These children have to survive by begging." The same report notes that while the law of Benin does not explicitly forbid infanticide, it prohibitis homicide, meaning that the murder of infants can be prosecuted as murder. Yet such cases rarely come to court because of respect for traditional beliefs and customs and/or because of the difficulty of gathering the necessary evidence.

Another custom that is still common is that of placing a poor child with a well-off family as a domestic servant, a situation that often results in sexual and labor exploitation and in trafficking. This practice is called "vidomègon". Other problems include child prostitution, which often involves street children, and child labor. There are a number of street children, many of whom do not attend school or have access to medical care.

A 2004 report underscores that in rural Benin, where violence against children is widespread, it is parents who play the leading role in this abuse, noting that they are responsible for "the murder of their children who are not born in a 'normal way'; they themselves ask the primary school teachers to beat their children; they ask policemen to inflict corporal punishment on their children who do wrong; they sell their children to child traffickers....Some of the children who are victims of violence committed by a member of the family or a state officer are not even aware of the fact that what they endure is blameful. Many cases of violence remain unknown because the victims do not denounce them or just because they consider them to be normal." The government has made efforts to improve the life of children in Benin, but the situation is still dire.

The Minors Protection Brigade was created in 1983 and "is mandated to act whenever children are in moral or physical danger. It carries out actions to prevent youth delinquency. It has progressively become an institution where problems involving children are settled in a friendly way. According to its officers, its role is more of a social nature today."

Benin is not a signatory of the 1980 Hague Convention on the Civil Aspects of International Child Abduction, but it ratified the UN Convention on the Rights of the Child in 1990, the African Charter on the Rights and Welfare of the Child in 1996, and the Convention no. 182 of ILO in 2004.

== Disabled rights ==
There is no law banning discrimination against disabled individuals, although the government, under the law, is supposed to care for such persons. Nor is there any law requiring any buildings, public or otherwise, to be wheelchair-accessible. There is little in the way of institutional help for disabled people, who generally support themselves through begging. There are, however, protections in the labor law for disabled workers.

== LGBT rights ==
In a 2012 report, the U.S. noted Benin's rejection of a previous recommendation that it "decriminalize sexual relations between consenting, same-sex individuals" and expressed continued concern "about LGBT citizens in Benin", asking: "What services or educational programs do you have in place to ensure the safety and wellbeing of LGBT citizens?" The report called on Benin to "[d]ecriminalize sexual relations between consenting, same-sex individuals and establish educational programs and appropriate policies for police that promote the personal security of all Benin citizens regardless of sexual orientation".

== HIV/AIDS rights ==
It is illegal to discriminate against people based on HIV status, and overt instances of such discrimination are reportedly not frequent.

== Minority rights ==
There is no majority ethnic group in Benin. A range of ethnic groups is represented in the public sector.

== Rights of refugees and asylum seekers ==
There is a system for protecting refugees, of which the country held about 7,300 at the end of 2010, most of them from Togo. Benin works with the UNHCR and other groups to assist such individuals. Those who do not qualify as refugees are invited to apply for residence permits.

== Employees' rights ==
Workers are allowed to unionize and to strike, although they are required to provide three days' notice of strikes and the government can prohibit them for a variety of reasons. Workers, except for those in merchant shipping, are also entitled to bargain collectively. There is a National Consultation and Collective Bargaining Commission that takes part in such negotiations. Forced labor is illegal, although it exists in a number of sectors, with children often involved. Children under 12 may not work at any job; those between 12 and 14 may do light work or hold domestic jobs. But these restrictions are not fully enforced, and in reality children as young as seven work in farms, businesses, construction, markets, and other settings, with some being indentured to "agents" and put to work in other countries.

Owing to a shortage of inspectors, the labor code is enforced poorly and only in the so-called formal sector. There is a minimum wage but it is very low, and there are various restrictions on working hours and the like but these are generally only enforced in the "formal sector". Health and safety standards are not enforced effectively either.

== Rights of persons under arrest ==
Arbitrary arrest is illegal, but it occurs. The police and gendarmerie are ill-equipped and ill-trained, although the government has made efforts to improve the situation. Under the constitution, defendants cannot be arrested without warrants and evidence and must be arraigned by a judge within 48 hours, but these rules are not always observed. Defendants' right to prompt judicial determination is generally respected, however, as is the right to prompt representation and family visits.

There is a problem with acts of violence committed by mobs against suspected criminals whom they feel have been inadequately punished by the courts; the members of such mobs are often not arrested. One report notes that the spread of this practice in Benin has been influenced by its earlier use in Nigeria.

Although Benin's constitution and laws ban torture, it does occur, and detainees are often beaten. In 2010, Adam Yessoufa died in custody after a reported beating by security forces. No information about the matter was released to the public and no charges were brought against anyone. A 2004 report observed that acts of brutal physical abuse by authorities routinely go unpunished in Benin. The report further noted that "law enforcement officials do not hesitate to use handcuffs and butts of cigarettes to master their own family members or relatives", citing the case of a member of the gendarmerie who handcuffed his wife and used tear gas on her.

== Rights of persons on trial ==
Trials are often delayed because of overcrowded dockets and inadequate staff and facilities. Although the judiciary is supposed to be independent, it is susceptible to influence by other branches of government. There is widespread corruption. Defendants have the usual rights under French civil law and local customs, including the right to jury trial, the presumption of innocence, the right to an attorney, the right to confront witnesses, and the right to appeal. These rights are generally respected. The fact that young defendants are not tried in juvenile courts represents a violation of international norms.

== Rights of inmates ==
Benin's prisons are overcrowded, with one of them housing a number of inmates that is six times its official capacity. Among the other problems in Benin's prisons are malnutrition, disease, poor sanitation, inadequate medical care, and a lack of ventilation. Juveniles are often imprisoned with adults. Human-rights monitors are allowed to visit prisons. Many women are imprisoned with their children and give birth in prison without a doctor present. A 2008 report by IRIN noted that "[p]rison conditions in Benin are so deplorable that they were, alongside police brutality, one of two reasons that compelled the international human rights watchdog Amnesty International to list the country in its annual State of the World's Human Rights report for the first time in 2008". A U.S. government report in 2012 called on Benin to "[i]mprove the conditions of prisons and other places of detention and reduce overcrowding by building more prisons or reducing the length of pre-trial detention". A 2012 report by ACAT-Benin made similar recommendations.

Capital punishment is still officially legal in Benin, and convicts are still sentenced to death, but no executions have taken place since 1987.

== See also ==
- Freedom of religion in Benin
- Human trafficking in Benin
- LGBT rights in Benin
- Politics of Benin

== Notes ==
1.Note that the "Year" signifies the "Year covered". Therefore the information for the year marked 2008 is from the report published in 2009, and so on.
2.As of January 1.
3.The 1982 report covers the year 1981 and the first half of 1982, and the following 1984 report covers the second half of 1982 and the whole of 1983. In the interest of simplicity, these two aberrant "year and a half" reports have been split into three year-long reports through interpolation.
