= Trade unions in Benin =

- National organization(s): CSA, CGTB, UNSTB
- Regulatory authority: Ministry of Labour
- Primary legislation: Benin Labour Code

Global Rights Index
- 4 Systematic violations of rights

International Labour Organization
- Benin is a member of the ILO

Convention ratification
- Freedom of Association: 12 December 1960
- Right to Organise: 16 May 1968

Trade unions in Benin operate in relative freedom, with approximately 75% of the formal sector being unionized. There are, however, concerns expressed by the International Labour Organization (ILO) and the International Trade Union Confederation (ITUC) about the discrepancies between the government's Labour Code and the labour practices outlined by ILO Conventions 87 (Freedom of Association) and 98 (Right to Organize) - specifically the right of unions to form without government approval, the right of seafarers to organize or strike, and restrictions on strikes.

== History ==
During the Communist era from 1972 to 1990, the trade union movement was organized in line with the professed Marxist-Leninist principles of the People's Revolutionary Party of Benin (PRPB). However, with the shift to a multi-party democracy in the 1990s, the trade union movement split into various entities.

== National bodies ==
There are three main national trade union centers in Benin. The National Union of the Unions of the Workers of Benin (UNSTB) was the sole trade union organization during the rule of the PRPB, having absorbed all former trade unions in 1974. The Autonomous Trade Unions Centre (CSA) formed with the rise of the multi-party system, and amid fears that the UNSTB would be unable to separate itself from the previous political powers. The third trade union center is the General Confederation of the Workers of Benin.

== Trade union concerns ==
Although Benin has ratified a number of the ILO "core conventions", there are notable deficiencies in the application of labour practices as espoused by the labour movement. In particular a 2004 report by ITUC (previously ICFTU) draws attention to the lack of women's equality in the workforce, the use of child labour, and the ongoing problem of forced labour.
