= Lake Nokoué =

Lake in Benin

- Denham Waters
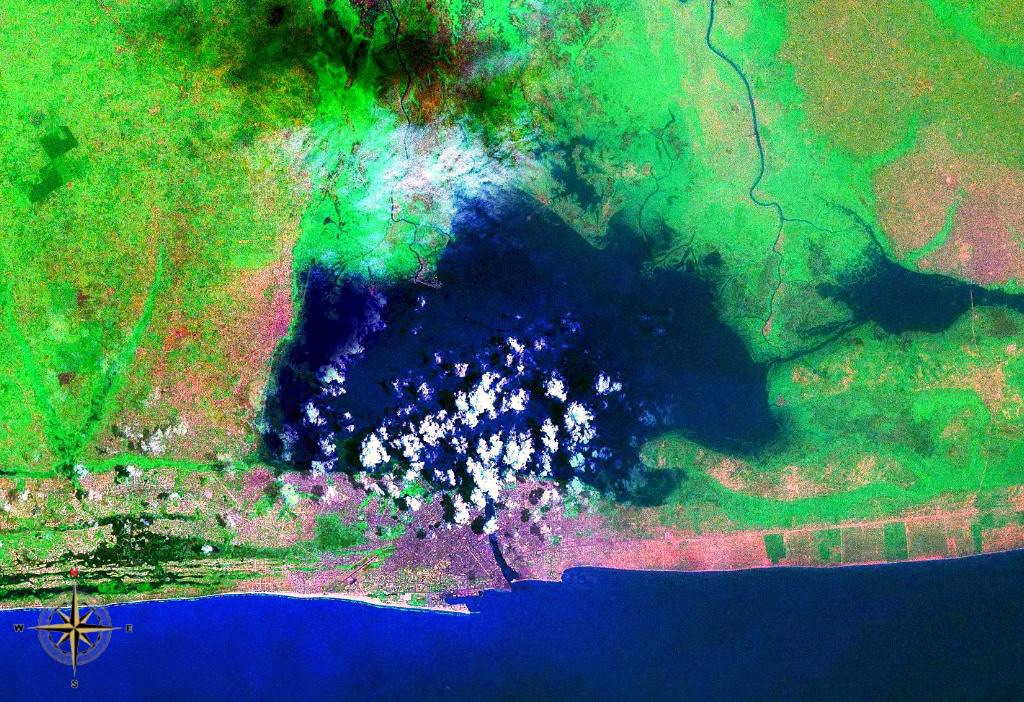
- Lake Nokoué seen from space (false colour)

- Location within Benin
- Coordinates: 6.433333°N 2.45°E
- Basin countries: Benin
- Max. length: 20 km (12 mi)
- Max. width: 11 km (6.8 mi)

Lake Nokoué is a lake in the southern part of Benin. It is 20 km (12 mi) wide and 11 km (6.8 mi) long and covers an area of 4,900 ha (12,000 acres). The lake is partly fed by the Ouémé River and the Sô River, both of which deposit sediments from throughout the region in the lake.

The city of Cotonou sits on the southern border of the lake. Sections of the population of Cotonou have been displaced by coastal and lake flooding. On the northern edge of the lake is the town of Ganvié.

== Economy ==
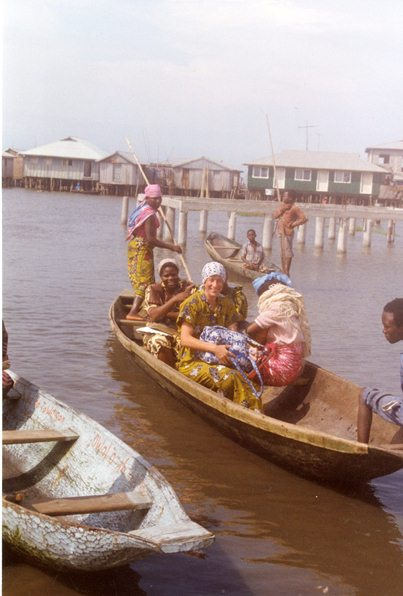
Mennonite missionary in a dugout canoe, similar to the ones used by local artisanal fishermen

Because of its diverse wildlife, the lake provides an important source of food and economic activity for these towns. Fishing is best when water is low between November and June. Fishing is typically of 30 species of fish, with fish from the Cichlid, Clupeidae and Penaeidae families making 85% of the catch. The fishery became more stressed during the 1990s, as more people began fishing on the lake. Fishing is typically artisanal, with small crew dugout canoes catching small batches of fish. The estimated fish production of the lake is 2 tonnes per hectare per year.

The lake is also used for Acadja, a type of fish breeding facility.

== Hydrology ==
The lake, in large part, is a lagoon. With the surrounding low-lying topography, the lake is expected to double in size and flood as the current global climate change gradually affects the sea level. This development carries a risk of future salinisation, which will make the freshwater lake more brackish and potentially change its ecology. Different sections of the lake currently alternate between freshwater and brackish ecosystems at an average depth of 1.5 m (4 ft 11 in). Normal temperatures throughout the lake are between 27 and 29 °C (81 and 84 °F).

The lake is a site of deposition of both pesticides and heavy metals from upstream industry and human habitation. Though the pesticides are only present in fish at less than toxic levels, the heavy metals in the waters can reach levels in fish both unhealthy for humans and the fish.

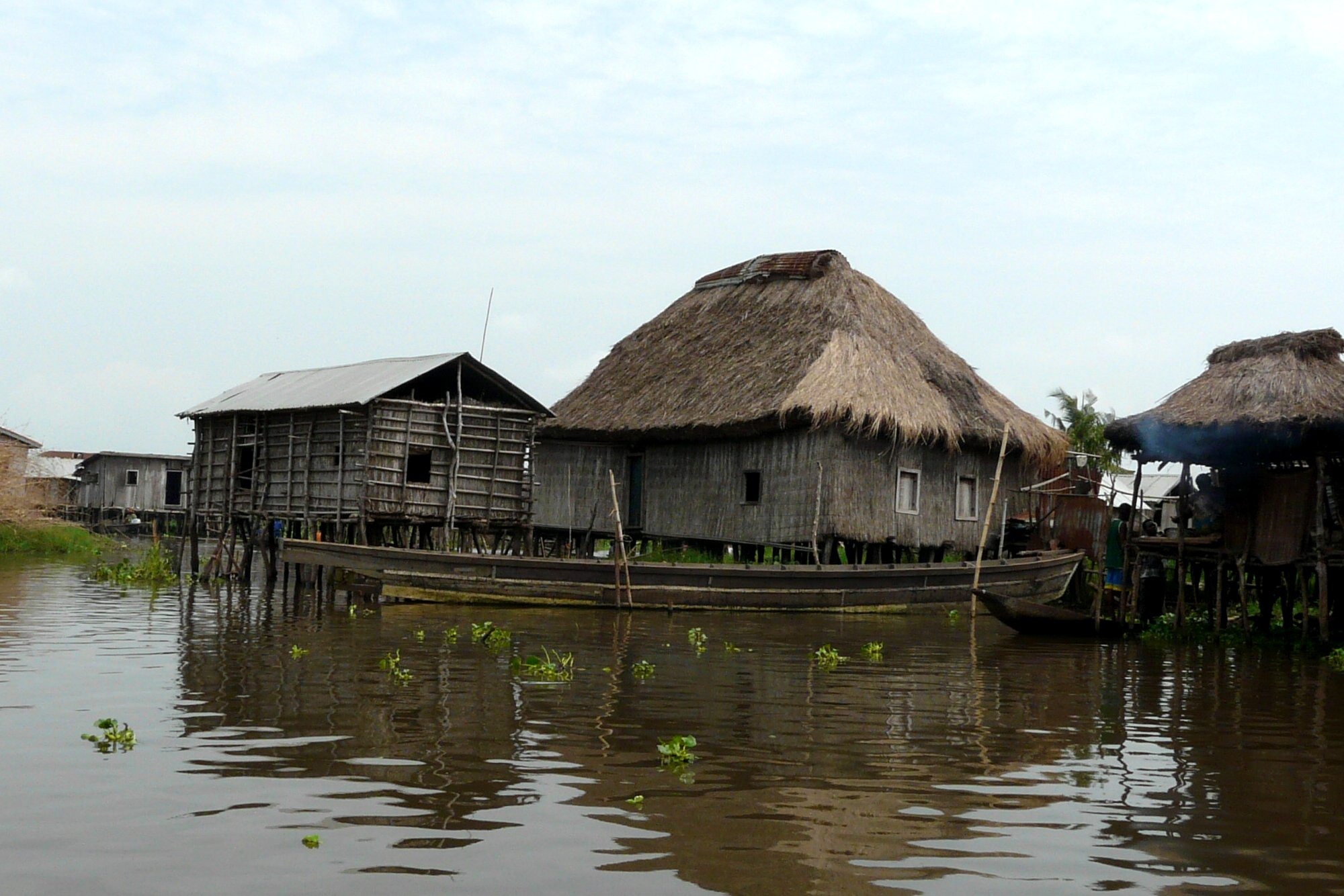
The lake village of Ganvie on its northern shore

== Geology ==
The floor of the lake is a mixture of sand, muddy-sand and mud layers.

== Ecology ==
Lake Nokoué has at least 78 species of fish. A number of bird species exploit the wide variety of fish as food, as well as species of otter.
