= National Union of the Unions of the Workers of Benin =

UNSTB
- National Union of the Unions of the Workers of Benin
- Union Nationale des Syndicats des travailleurs du Bénin
- Founded: 1974
- Headquarters: Cotonou, Benin
- Location: Benin
- Members: ~40,000
- Key people: Nicodéme Julian Codjo Assogba
- Affiliations: ITUC

The National Union of the Unions of the Workers of Benin (UNSTB) was, from its founding in 1974 until the 1990s, the sole union federation in Benin. It was originally closely related to the People's Revolutionary Party of Benin (PRPB).

The UNSTB is affiliated with the International Trade Union Confederation.

== See also ==
- Trade unions in Benin
