= L'Aube nouvelle =

National anthem of Benin

English: The New Dawn
- National anthem of Benin
- Lyrics: Father Gilbert Jean Dagnon
- Music: Father Gilbert Jean Dagnon
- Adopted: 30 July 1960

Audio sample
- U.S. Navy Band instrumental version: file; help

"L'Aube nouvelle" ("The New Dawn") is the national anthem of Benin. Written and composed by Father Gilbert Jean Dagnon, it was adopted upon independence of the Republic of Dahomey from France in 1960.

After Dahomey became the People's Republic of Benin in 1975, the anthem was retained, but the words Dahomey and Dahoméen were changed to Bénin and Béninois.

== Lyrics ==
The first verse and chorus is usually only performed at official occasions.

=== French original ===
French lyrics

Refrain:
Enfants du Bénin, debout !
La liberté d'un cri sonore
Chante aux premiers feux de l'aurore;
Enfants du Bénin, debout !

I
Jadis à son appel, nos aïeux sans faiblesse
Ont su avec courage, ardeur, pleins d'allégresse
Livrer au prix du sang des combats éclatants.
Accourez-vous aussi, bâtisseurs du présent,
Plus forts dans l'unité, chaque jour à la tâche,
Pour la postérité, construisez sans relâche !

Refrain

II
Quand partout souffle un vent de colère et de haine,
Béninois, sois fier, et d'une âme sereine,
Confiant dans l'avenir, regarde ton drapeau !
Dans le vert tu liras l'espoir du renouveau,
De tes aïeux le rouge évoque le courage;
Des plus riches trésors le jaune est le présage.

Refrain

III
Tes monts ensoleillés, tes palmiers, ta verdure,
Cher Bénin, partout font ta vive parure.
Ton sol offre à chacun la richesse des fruits.
Bénin, désormais que tes fils tous unis
D'un fraternel élan partagent l'espérance
De te voir à jamais heureux dans l'abondance.

Refrain

English translation

Chorus:
Children of Benin, arise!
The resounding cry of freedom
Is heard at the first light of dawn,
Children of Benin, arise!

I
Formerly, at her call, our ancestors
With strength, courage, ardour, and full of joy,
Knew how to engage in mighty battles, but at the price of blood.
Builders of present, you too, join forces
Each day for the task stronger in unity.
Build without ceasing for posterity.

Chorus

II
When all around there blows a wind of anger and hate:
Citizen of Benin be proud, and in a calm spirit
Trusting in the future, behold your flag!
In the green you read hope of spring;
The red signifies the courage of your ancestors;
The yellow foretells the greatest treasures.

Chorus

III
Beloved Benin, your sunny mountains, palm trees, and green pastures
Show everywhere your brightness;
Your soil offers everyone the richest fruits.
Benin, from henceforth your sons are united
With one brotherly spirit sharing the hope of seeing you
Enjoy abundance and happiness forever.

Chorus

=== In local languages ===
Fon lyrics

Hanyìyi:
Benin tó vì lè mì, mi sité!
Oó mi sité b’á nyi mi désú.
Ayi dò hùnhon dayi
Djiwè mi bo fon.

I
Hein sin hwéxónú wè yôlô
Éyè ko sô akpakpa togbo miton
Lè bô yé ko djè godomin lobo
Kpankon bô vankan kpo xominhunhun kpán,
Boyi sozonou bô kandjo
Kon yanyi bi vanyan vanyan.

Hanyìyi

II
Bénin lidótétó din ton lè mi
Lo kan wézoun wá, mi sè takplé
Bó man só kanlan gbéo,
Ma mon gan do wa toyè zô,
Nou é nanyi ta bonou vivoù vivou miton
Lè kan nan wa mon gouton ba doula.

Hanyìyi

III
Homin sin kpodo wangbènoumin
Djohon do yinyi wè ló kèlô
Fji tchobô bénin vi,
Ma lin noudé oo vòbo go bèlèo,
Ogo bonou noudé ma gba ayi donouwéo
Ado kounon houn só winyan oo.

Hanyìyi

IV
Vèdédji do sohou bo kpon asiyà tówé,
Sin ton amamou lò niyi noukou dido towé,
Bô vôvô lò filin wé ta é togbo towé
Yé ko siyin sin houéhonou lé,
Koklodjonon lô ka nan djidé wédô,
Odôkoun lo ana wa mon dodoo.

Hanyìyi

V
Bénin to tché é ô, o só é wésivô
Non bala ta nan yênin nin lé o
Dékan man do hiha, ayi kougban é do
Agbafa fa lé wè sô do matcho nouwé,
Ayondèkpè bo kénou hounou bi non bawé, guélési dé kou non hokan dayi
Towédji tcho bo non mon noudou dou oo

Hanyìyi

VI
Oo Béninn, vito wélê ni do gbékpo
Bo só noukon yiyi nou,
Di nonvi nonvi dohoun, bo donoukou dô wô nan djê,
Wô nan djêbo wô nan djê
Bô vivoù vivou towé lè nan wa mon dou,
Dè é mi kon non honou wé tègbè lé éé ka nin.

Hanyìyi

Yoruba lyrics

Egbe:
Awọn ọmọ Benin, dide!
Igbe igbe olominira
Ti gbọ ni owurọ akọkọ ti owurọ,
Awọn ọmọ Benin, dide!

I
Ni iṣaaju, ni ipe rẹ, awọn baba wa
Mọ bi o ṣe le kopa ninu awọn ogun alagbara
Pẹlu agbara, igboya, igboya, o si kun fun ayọ, ṣugbọn ni idiyele ẹjẹ.
Awọn akọle ti asiko, iwọ paapaa, darapọ mọ ipa
Ni ọjọ kọọkan fun iṣẹ-ṣiṣe ni okun sii ni iṣọkan.
Kọ laisi diduro fun iran-iran.

Egbe

II
Nigbati gbogbo ayika wa nfẹ afẹfẹ ibinu ati ikorira:
Ara ilu ti Benin jẹ igberaga, ati ni ẹmi idakẹjẹ
Gbẹkẹle ọjọ iwaju, kiyesi asia rẹ!
Ninu alawọ ewe o ka ireti orisun omi;
Pupa n tọka igboya ti awọn baba nla rẹ;
Awọn ofeefee sọ asọtẹlẹ awọn iṣura nla julọ.

Egbe

III
Olufẹ Benin, awọn oke-nla rẹ ti oorun, awọn igi-ọpẹ, ati awọn koriko alawọ ewe
Fi imọlẹ rẹ han nibikibi;
Ilẹ rẹ nfun gbogbo eniyan ni awọn eso ọlọrọ.
Benin, lati isinsinyi awọn ọmọ rẹ wa ni iṣọkan
Pẹlu ẹmi arakunrin kan pin ireti ti ri ọ
Gbadun opo ati idunnu lailai.

Egbe
