= Telecommunications in Benin =

Telephones - main lines in use: 110,300 (2007)
country comparison to the world: 137

Telephones - mobile cellular: 1,895 million (2007)
country comparison to the world: 114

Telephone system:
general assessment: inadequate; fixed-line network characterized by aging, deteriorating equipment with fixed-line teledensity stuck at 1 per 100 persons; mobile-cellular telephone subscribership is increasing
domestic: system of open-wire, microwave radio relay, and cellular connections; multiple mobile-cellular providers
international: country code - 229; landing point for the SAT-3/WASC fiber-optic submarine cable that provides connectivity to Europe and Asia; satellite earth stations - 7 (Intelsat-Atlantic Ocean) (2007)

Radio broadcast stations: AM 1, FM 34, shortwave 1 (2007)

Radios: 620,000 (1997)

Television broadcast stations: 6 (2007)

Televisions: 60,000 (1997)

Internet Hosts: 848 (2008)
country comparison to the world: 157

Internet Users: 150,000 (2007)
country comparison to the world: 137

Country codes: .bj

== See also ==
- Benin
