= 2004 African Cup of Nations squads =

Below is a list of squads used in the 2004 African Cup of Nations.

== Group A ==
=== DR Congo ===
Head coach: (England) Mick Wadsworth

No.	Pos.	Player	Date of birth (age)	Caps	Club
1	GK	Paulin Tokala Kombe	26 March 1977 (aged 26)		(Angola) Primeiro Agosto
2	DF	Félix Mwamba Musasa	25 December 1976 (aged 27)		(South Africa) Orlando Pirates
3	DF	Camille Muzinga	6 December 1980 (aged 23)		(Belgium) Lokeren
4	DF	Cyrille Mubiala Kitambala	7 July 1974 (aged 29)		(South Africa) Ajax Cape Town
5	DF	Jean-Paul Kamudimba	16 March 1982 (aged 21)		(France) Nice
6	MF	Trésor Luntala	31 May 1982 (aged 21)		(Switzerland) Grasshoppers
7	FW	Dieudonné Kalilulika	1 October 1983 (aged 20)		(Democratic Republic of the Congo) TP Mazembe
8	MF	Kangama Ndiwa	28 February 1984 (aged 19)		(England) Bolton Wanderers
9	FW	Lomana LuaLua	28 December 1980 (aged 23)		(England) Newcastle United
10	MF	Alain Masudi	12 February 1978 (aged 25)		(Austria) Sturm Graz
11	FW	Musasa Kabamba	30 June 1982 (aged 21)		(South Africa) Kaizer Chiefs
12	MF	Franck Matingou	4 December 1979 (aged 24)		(France) Bastia
13	MF	Ngoy Bomboko	21 May 1977 (aged 26)		(Democratic Republic of the Congo) TP Mazembe
14	DF	Michel Dinzey Sinda	15 October 1972 (aged 31)		(Germany) Eintracht Braunschweig
15	DF	Hérita Ilunga	25 February 1982 (aged 21)		(France) Saint-Étienne
16	GK	Papy Lukata Shumu	23 April 1978 (aged 25)		(Angola) Aviação
17	FW	Merlin Mpiana	17 July 1982 (aged 21)		(Romania) Oțelul Galați
18	MF	Marcel Kimemba Mbayo	24 April 1978 (aged 25)		(Turkey) Gençlerbirliği
19	FW	Biscotte Mbala Mbuta	7 April 1985 (aged 18)		(Democratic Republic of the Congo) Motema Pembe
20	DF	Bijou Kisombe Mundaba	29 September 1976 (aged 27)		(Democratic Republic of the Congo) Vita Club
21	MF	Olivier Nzuzi Niati Polo	16 September 1980 (aged 23)		(Austria) SW Bregenz
22	GK	Muteba Kidiaba	1 February 1976 (aged 27)		(Democratic Republic of the Congo) TP Mazembe

=== Guinea ===
Head coach: (France) Michel Dussuyer

No.	Pos.	Player	Date of birth (age)	Caps	Club
1	GK	Mohamed Keita	1 January 1980 (aged 24)		(Guinea) Kaloum
2	MF	Pascal Feindouno	27 February 1981 (aged 22)		(France) Bordeaux
3	MF	Abdoul Salam Sow	13 August 1970 (aged 33)		(Qatar) Al-Ittihad
4	DF	Mamadi Kaba	15 June 1982 (aged 21)		(Guinea) Kaloum
5	DF	Bobo Baldé	5 October 1975 (aged 28)		(Scotland) Celtic
6	DF	Almamy Schuman Bah	24 August 1974 (aged 29)		(France) Metz
7	FW	Fodé Mansare	3 September 1981 (aged 22)		(France) Montpellier
8	DF	Kanfoury Sylla	7 July 1980 (aged 23)		(Belgium) Charleroi
9	FW	Sambégou Bangoura	3 April 1982 (aged 21)		(Belgium) Standard Liège
10	FW	Titi Camara	17 November 1972 (aged 31)		(Qatar) Al-Siliya
11	FW	Souleymane Youla	29 November 1982 (aged 21)		(Turkey) Gençlerbirliği
12	DF	Kader Camara	18 March 1982 (aged 21)		(Belgium) Cercle Brugge
13	DF	Ibrahima Sory Conte	3 June 1981 (aged 22)		(Belgium) Lokeren
14	MF	Ousmane N'Gom Camara	26 May 1975 (aged 28)		(Belgium) KSK Heusden-Zolder
15	MF	Sékou Oumar Drame	23 December 1973 (aged 30)		(United Arab Emirates) Dubai CSC
16	GK	Kémoko Camara	4 May 1975 (aged 28)		(Israel) Bnei Sakhnin
17	DF	Morlaye Soumah	4 November 1971 (aged 32)		(France) Bastia
18	MF	Abdoulaye Kapi Sylla	15 September 1982 (aged 21)		(France) Tours
19	MF	Mangué Camara	15 September 1982 (aged 21)		(Guinea) Kaloum
20	MF	Abdoul Karim Sylla	10 January 1981 (aged 23)		(Belgium) Lokeren
21	FW	Alhassane Keita	26 June 1983 (aged 20)		(Switzerland) Zürich
22	GK	Abdallah Bah	30 November 1975 (aged 28)		(France) Nice

=== Rwanda ===
Head coach: (Serbia and Montenegro) Ratomir Dujković

No.	Pos.	Player	Date of birth (age)	Caps	Club
1	GK	Patrick Mbeu	9 March 1986 (aged 17)		(Rwanda) APR
2	MF	Jean-Paul Habyarimana	17 August 1982 (aged 21)		(Rwanda) APR
3	DF	Hamad Ndikumana	5 October 1978 (aged 25)		(Belgium) Gent
4	DF	Abdul Sibomana	10 December 1981 (aged 22)		(Rwanda) APR
5	DF	Léandre Bizagwira	9 June 1981 (aged 22)		(Rwanda) Kiyovu Sport
6	MF	Frédéric Rusanganwa	4 April 1980 (aged 23)		(Rwanda) APR
7	DF	Canisius Bizimana	15 January 1984 (aged 20)		(Rwanda) Mukura Victory Sports
8	MF	Michel Kamanzi	22 September 1974 (aged 29)		(Germany) SG 06 Betzdorf
9	MF	Joao Elias	12 December 1973 (aged 30)		(Belgium) Kortrijk
10	FW	Jimmy Gatete	11 December 1982 (aged 21)		(Rwanda) APR
11	FW	Olivier Karekezi	25 May 1983 (aged 20)		(Rwanda) APR
12	FW	Henri Munyaneza	19 June 1984 (aged 19)		(Belgium) Eendracht Aalst
13	DF	Elias Ntaganda	1 January 1982 (aged 22)		(Rwanda) APR
14	FW	Saïd Abed Makasi	20 August 1982 (aged 21)		(Belgium) Brussels
15	FW	Désiré Mbonabucya	25 February 1977 (aged 26)		(Belgium) Sint-Truidense
16	MF	Eric Nshimiyimana	8 May 1972 (aged 31)		(Rwanda) APR
17	FW	Jean Lomani	27 July 1982 (aged 21)		(Zambia) Power Dynamos
18	GK	Ramadhani Nkunzingoma	2 September 1977 (aged 26)		(Rwanda) APR
19	MF	Karim Kamanzi	29 September 1979 (aged 24)		(Belgium) Visé
20	MF	Jimmy Mulisa	3 April 1984 (aged 19)		(Rwanda) APR
21	DF	Jean Rémy Bitana	5 May 1984 (aged 19)		(Rwanda) Rayon Sport
22	GK	Jean-Claude Ndagijimana	26 November 1984 (aged 19)		(Rwanda) Rayon Sport

=== Tunisia ===
Head coach: (France) Roger Lemerre

No.	Pos.	Player	Date of birth (age)	Caps	Club
1	GK	Ali Boumnijel	13 April 1966 (aged 37)		(France) Rouen
2	DF	Khaled Badra	8 April 1973 (aged 30)		(Tunisia) Espérance
3	DF	Karim Haggui	20 January 1984 (aged 20)		(Tunisia) Étoile du Sahel
4	DF	Alaeddine Yahia	26 September 1981 (aged 22)		(France) Guingamp
5	FW	Ziad Jaziri	12 July 1978 (aged 25)		(Turkey) Gaziantepspor
6	DF	Hatem Trabelsi	25 January 1977 (aged 26)		(Netherlands) Ajax
7	FW	Imed Mhedhebi	22 March 1976 (aged 27)		(Tunisia) Étoile du Sahel
8	MF	Mehdi Nafti	28 November 1978 (aged 25)		(Spain) Racing de Santander
9	FW	Najeh Braham	20 May 1977 (aged 26)		(Germany) Eintracht Trier
10	MF	Kaies Ghodhbane	7 January 1976 (aged 28)		(Turkey) Diyarbakırspor
11	FW	Francileudo dos Santos	20 March 1979 (aged 24)		(France) Sochaux
12	MF	Jawhar Mnari	8 November 1976 (aged 27)		(Tunisia) Espérance
13	MF	Riadh Bouazizi	8 April 1973 (aged 30)		(Turkey) Gaziantepspor
14	MF	Adel Chedli	16 September 1976 (aged 27)		(France) Sochaux
15	DF	Radhi Jaïdi	30 August 1975 (aged 28)		(Tunisia) Espérance
16	GK	Khaled Fadhel	29 September 1976 (aged 27)		(Tunisia) Sfaxien
17	FW	Mohamed Jedidi	10 September 1978 (aged 25)		(Tunisia) Étoile du Sahel
18	MF	Selim Ben Achour	8 September 1981 (aged 22)		(France) Paris Saint-Germain
19	DF	Anis Ayari	16 February 1982 (aged 21)		(Tunisia) Stade Tunisien
20	DF	Jose Clayton	21 March 1974 (aged 29)		(Tunisia) Espérance
21	DF	Karim Saidi	24 March 1983 (aged 20)		(Tunisia) Club Africain
22	GK	Khaled Azaiez	30 October 1976 (aged 27)		(Tunisia) Club Africain

== Group B ==
=== Burkina Faso ===
Head coach: (France) Jean-Paul Rabier

No.	Pos.	Player	Date of birth (age)	Caps	Club
1	GK	Mohamed Kaboré	31 December 1980 (aged 23)		(Burkina Faso) Étoile Filante de Ouagadougou
2	DF	Moussa Ouattara	31 December 1981 (aged 22)		(France) Créteil
3	FW	Patrick Zoundi	19 July 1982 (aged 21)		(Belgium) Lokeren
4	DF	Jean-Michel Liade Gnonka	1 March 1980 (aged 23)		(Algeria) Kouba
6	MF	Rahim Ouédraogo	8 October 1980 (aged 23)		(Netherlands) Twente
7	DF	Amadou Coulibaly	31 December 1984 (aged 19)		(Burkina Faso) RC Bobo
8	MF	Mahamoudou Kéré	1 February 1982 (aged 21)		(Belgium) Charleroi
9	FW	Moumouni Dagano	3 January 1981 (aged 23)		(France) Guingamp
10	FW	Abdoulaye Cissé	24 December 1983 (aged 20)		(France) Montpellier
11	FW	Tanguy Barro	13 September 1982 (aged 21)		(France) Chamois Niortais
12	MF	Saïdou Panandétiguiri	22 March 1984 (aged 19)		(France) Bordeaux
13	MF	Bèbè Kambou	1 July 1982 (aged 21)		(France) Louhans-Cuiseaux
14	FW	Dieudonné Minoungou	25 June 1981 (aged 22)		(France) Tours
15	DF	Ousmane Traoré	7 March 1977 (aged 26)		(France) Lorient
16	GK	Abdoulaye Soulama	21 February 1984 (aged 19)		(Burkina Faso) ASF Bobo
17	MF	Amadou Tidiane Tall	22 June 1975 (aged 28)		(Burkina Faso) Étoile Filante
18	MF	Amadou Touré	23 December 1979 (aged 24)		(Belgium) Mons
19	DF	Mohamed Ali Diallo	5 May 1978 (aged 25)		(Burkina Faso) ASFA Yennenga
20	MF	Amara Ahmed Ouattara	21 October 1983 (aged 20)		(Burkina Faso) RC Kadiogo
21	FW	Toussaint Natama	31 October 1982 (aged 21)		(Belgium) Westerlo
22	GK	Daouda Compaoré	6 January 1973 (aged 31)		(Burkina Faso) ASFA Yennenga

=== Kenya ===
Head coach: Jacob Mulee

No.	Pos.	Player	Date of birth (age)	Caps	Club
1	GK	Francis Onyiso Okoth	16 November 1972 (aged 31)		(Kenya) Ulinzi Stars
2	DF	George Japhet Waweru	12 October 1978 (aged 25)		(Kenya) Tusker
3	DF	Kassim Issa	21 December 1975 (aged 28)		(Kenya) Mumias Sugar
4	DF	Musa Otieno	29 December 1973 (aged 30)		(South Africa) Santos
5	MF	Thomas Juma Oundo	23 September 1976 (aged 27)		(Sweden) Friska Viljor
6	MF	Anthony Mathenge Gitau	23 October 1978 (aged 25)		(Kenya) Thika United
7	MF	Titus Mulama	6 August 1980 (aged 23)		(Kenya) Mathare United
8	DF	Adam Shaban Wesa	28 February 1983 (aged 20)		(Kenya) Mathare United
9	FW	Mike Okoth Origi	16 November 1967 (aged 36)		(Belgium) Heusden-Zolder
10	MF	John Muiruri	10 October 1979 (aged 24)		(Belgium) Gent
11	FW	John Wamalwa Baraza	3 June 1974 (aged 29)		(Sweden) IF Sylvia
12	FW	Maurice Sunguti	6 October 1977 (aged 26)		(Sweden) Friska Viljor
13	GK	Willis Ochieng	10 October 1981 (aged 22)		(South Africa) Free State Stars
14	DF	Andrew Oyombe Opiyo	24 February 1985 (aged 18)		(Kenya) Tusker
15	DF	Philip Opiyo	27 February 1979 (aged 24)		(South Africa) Free State Stars
16	FW	James Omondi	30 December 1980 (aged 23)		(Kenya) Thika United
17	MF	Robert Mambo Mumba	25 October 1978 (aged 25)		(Belgium) Gent
18	FW	Dennis Oliech	2 February 1985 (aged 18)		(Qatar) Al-Arabi
19	FW	Emmanuel Ake	11 June 1980 (aged 23)		(Denmark) AB
20	MF	Walter Odede Amimo	11 November 1974 (aged 29)		(Kenya) Mathare United
21	DF	Moses Nyandusi Gikenyi	19 November 1972 (aged 31)		(Seychelles) St Michel United
22	GK	Duncan Ochieng	31 August 1978 (aged 25)		(Kenya) Mathare United

Since participation in CAN 2004, the Kenyan goalkeepers received real numbers 1, 13 and 22.

=== Mali ===
Head coach: (France) Henri Stambouli

No.	Pos.	Player	Date of birth (age)	Caps	Club
1	GK	Mahamadou Sidibè	4 October 1978 (aged 25)		(Greece) Egaleo
2	DF	Souleymane Diamoutene	30 January 1983 (aged 20)		(Italy) Perugia
3	DF	Fousseni Diawara	28 August 1980 (aged 23)		(France) Stade Lavallois
4	DF	Adama Coulibaly	9 October 1980 (aged 23)		(France) Lens
5	DF	Brahim Thiam	24 February 1974 (aged 29)		(France) Istres
6	MF	Mahamadou Diarra	18 May 1981 (aged 22)		(France) Lyon
7	FW	Mamady Sidibé	18 December 1979 (aged 24)		(England) Gillingham
8	MF	Bassala Touré	21 February 1976 (aged 27)		(Greece) Kerkyra
9	FW	Sédonoudé Abouta	1 January 1981 (aged 23)		(Mali) Djoliba
10	MF	Soumaila Coulibaly	15 April 1978 (aged 25)		(Germany) SC Freiburg
11	MF	Djibril Sidibé	23 February 1982 (aged 21)		(France) Châteauroux
12	MF	Seydou Keita	16 January 1980 (aged 24)		(France) Lens
13	DF	Ibrahima Koné	6 October 1977 (aged 26)		(Senegal) ASC Jeanne d'Arc
14	MF	David Coulibaly	21 January 1978 (aged 26)		(France) Châteauroux
15	FW	Abdoulaye Demba	2 November 1976 (aged 27)		(Belgium) Eendracht Aalst
16	GK	Cheick Bathily	10 October 1982 (aged 21)		(Mali) Djoliba
17	DF	Sammy Traoré	25 February 1976 (aged 27)		(France) Nice
18	MF	Mohamed Sissoko	22 January 1985 (aged 19)		(Spain) Valencia
19	FW	Frédéric Kanouté	2 September 1977 (aged 26)		(England) Tottenham Hotspur
20	FW	Dramane Traoré	17 June 1982 (aged 21)		(Egypt) Ismaily
21	DF	Mamary Traoré	29 April 1980 (aged 23)		(France) Grenoble
22	GK	Fousseiny Tangara	12 June 1978 (aged 25)		(France) Mantes

=== Senegal ===
Head coach: (France) Guy Stéphan

No.	Pos.	Player	Date of birth (age)	Caps	Club
1	GK	Tony Sylva	17 May 1975 (aged 28)		(France) Monaco
2	DF	Omar Daf	12 February 1977 (aged 26)		(France) Sochaux
3	DF	Ibrahima Faye	22 October 1979 (aged 24)		(Belgium) Gent
4	DF	Pape Malick Diop	29 December 1974 (aged 29)		(France) Lorient
5	DF	Souleymane Diawara	24 December 1978 (aged 25)		(France) Sochaux
6	MF	Aliou Cissé (c)	24 March 1976 (aged 27)		(England) Birmingham City
7	FW	Henri Camara	10 May 1977 (aged 26)		(England) Wolverhampton Wanderers
8	DF	Sylvain N'Diaye	25 June 1976 (aged 27)		(France) Marseille
9	FW	Diomansy Kamara	8 November 1980 (aged 23)		(Italy) Modena
10	MF	Lamine Sakho	28 September 1977 (aged 26)		(England) Leeds United
11	FW	El Hadji Diouf	15 January 1981 (aged 23)		(England) Liverpool
12	FW	Frédéric Mendy	6 November 1981 (aged 22)		(France) Saint-Étienne
13	DF	Lamine Diatta	2 July 1975 (aged 28)		(France) Rennes
14	FW	Ousmane N'Doye	12 March 1978 (aged 25)		(France) Toulouse
15	MF	Salif Diao	10 February 1977 (aged 26)		(England) Liverpool
16	GK	Omar Diallo	28 September 1972 (aged 31)		(Senegal) ASC Diaraf
17	DF	Ferdinand Coly	9 October 1973 (aged 30)		(Italy) Perugia
18	FW	Mamadou Niang	13 October 1979 (aged 24)		(France) Strasbourg
19	MF	Papa Bouba Diop	28 January 1978 (aged 25)		(France) Lens
20	MF	Abdoulaye Faye	26 February 1978 (aged 25)		(France) Lens
21	DF	Habib Beye	19 October 1977 (aged 26)		(France) Marseille
22	GK	Kalidou Cissokho	28 August 1978 (aged 25)		(Senegal) ASC Jeanne d'Arc

== Group C ==
=== Algeria ===
Head coach: Rabah Saadane

No.	Pos.	Player	Date of birth (age)	Caps	Club
1	GK	Hichem Mezaïr	16 October 1976 (aged 27)	24	(Algeria) USM Alger
2	MF	Abdelnasser Ouadah	13 September 1975 (aged 28)	1	(France) Ajaccio
3	DF	Moulay Haddou	14 June 1975 (aged 28)		(Algeria) MC Oran
4	DF	Samir Beloufa	27 August 1979 (aged 24)	1	(Belgium) Mouscron
5	DF	Salim Aribi	16 December 1974 (aged 29)	10	(Algeria) USM Alger
6	MF	Yazid Mansouri	25 February 1978 (aged 25)	16	(England) Coventry City
7	FW	Abdelmalek Cherrad	14 January 1981 (aged 23)	7	(France) Nice
8	MF	Nacereddine Kraouche	27 August 1979 (aged 24)	28	(Belgium) Gent
9	FW	Nassim Akrour	10 July 1974 (aged 29)	15	(France) Troyes
10	MF	Djamel Belmadi (c)	27 March 1976 (aged 27)	13	(Qatar) Al-Gharafa
11	FW	Mansour Boutabout	20 September 1978 (aged 25)	3	(France) Guegnon
12	GK	Lounès Gaouaoui	28 September 1977 (aged 26)	11	(Algeria) JS Kabylie
13	DF	Brahim Zafour	30 November 1977 (aged 26)	27	(Algeria) JS Kabylie
14	FW	Farès Fellahi	13 May 1975 (aged 28)	7	(Algeria) ES Sétif
15	MF	Karim Ziani	17 August 1982 (aged 21)	4	(France) Troyes
16	GK	Mohamed Benhamou	17 December 1979 (aged 24)	0	(France) Paris Saint-Germain
17	DF	Samir Zaoui	6 June 1976 (aged 27)	7	(Algeria) ASO Chlef
18	DF	Slimane Raho	21 October 1975 (aged 28)	26	(Algeria) JS Kabylie
19	MF	Maamar Mamouni	26 February 1976 (aged 27)	20	(Belgium) La Louvière
20	MF	Fodil Hadjadj	18 April 1983 (aged 20)	4	(France) Nantes
21	DF	Antar Yahia	21 March 1982 (aged 21)	1	(France) Bastia
22	MF	Hocine Achiou	27 April 1979 (aged 24)	6	(Algeria) USM Alger

=== Cameroon ===
Coach: (Germany) Winfried Schafer

No.	Pos.	Player	Date of birth (age)	Caps	Club
1	GK	Carlos Kameni	18 February 1984 (aged 19)		(France) Le Havre
2	DF	Joël Perrier-Doumbé	27 September 1978 (aged 25)		(France) Auxerre
3	DF	Bill Tchato	14 May 1975 (aged 28)		(Germany) 1. FC Kaiserslautern
4	DF	Rigobert Song	1 July 1976 (aged 27)		(France) Lens
5	MF	Timothée Atouba	17 February 1982 (aged 21)		(Switzerland) Basel
6	DF	Pierre Njanka	15 March 1975 (aged 28)		(France) Sedan
7	MF	Modeste M'Bami	9 October 1982 (aged 21)		(France) Paris Saint-Germain
8	DF	Geremi	20 December 1978 (aged 25)		(England) Chelsea
9	FW	Samuel Eto'o	10 March 1981 (aged 22)		(Spain) Mallorca
10	FW	Patrick M'Boma	15 November 1970 (aged 33)		(Japan) Tokyo Verdy
11	FW	Pius N'Diefi	5 July 1975 (aged 28)		(Qatar) Al Ittihad
12	MF	Falemi Ngassam	5 May 1974 (aged 29)		(Romania) Steaua București
13	DF	Lucien Mettomo	19 April 1977 (aged 26)		(Germany) 1. FC Kaiserslautern
14	MF	Jean Makoun	29 May 1983 (aged 20)		(France) Lille
15	DF	Gustave Bahoken	13 June 1979 (aged 24)		(France) Angers
16	GK	Patrick Tignyemb	14 June 1985 (aged 18)		(Cameroon) Tonnerre Yaoundé
17	GK	Mathurin Kameni	4 February 1978 (aged 25)		(Cameroon) Coton Sport
18	FW	Mohamadou Idrissou	8 March 1980 (aged 23)		(Germany) Hannover 96
19	MF	Eric Djemba-Djemba	4 May 1981 (aged 22)		(England) Manchester United
20	MF	Salomon Olembe	8 December 1980 (aged 23)		(England) Leeds United
21	MF	Valéry Mezague	8 December 1983 (aged 20)		(France) Montpellier
22	MF	Daniel Kome	19 May 1980 (aged 23)		(Spain) Numancia

=== Egypt ===
Head coach: Mohsen Saleh

No.	Pos.	Player	Date of birth (age)	Caps	Club
1	GK	Nader El-Sayed	31 December 1972 (aged 31)		(Egypt) Al-Ittihad
2	DF	Amr Fahim	4 October 1976 (aged 27)		(Egypt) Ismaily
3	DF	Wael El-Quabbani	2 September 1976 (aged 27)		(Egypt) Zamalek
4	DF	Emad El Nahhas	15 February 1976 (aged 27)		(Egypt) Ismaily
5	DF	Abdel-Zaher El-Saqua	30 January 1974 (aged 29)		(Turkey) Gençlerbirliği
6	DF	Wael Gomaa	3 August 1975 (aged 28)		(Egypt) Al-Ahly
7	MF	Ahmed Fathy	10 November 1984 (aged 19)		(Egypt) Ismaily
8	MF	Tamer Abdel Hamid	27 October 1975 (aged 28)		(Egypt) Zamalek
9	FW	Mido	23 February 1983 (aged 20)		(France) Marseille
10	FW	Ahmed Belal	20 August 1980 (aged 23)		(Egypt) Al-Ahly
11	MF	Tarek El-Said	5 April 1978 (aged 25)		(Egypt) Zamalek
12	MF	Mohamed Barakat	20 November 1976 (aged 27)		(Qatar) Al-Arabi
13	DF	Tarek El-Sayed	9 October 1978 (aged 25)		(Egypt) Zamalek
14	MF	Hazem Emam	10 May 1975 (aged 28)		(Egypt) Zamalek
15	DF	Besheer El-Tabei	24 February 1976 (aged 27)		(Egypt) Zamalek
16	GK	Abdel Wahed Al Sayed	3 June 1977 (aged 26)		(Egypt) Zamalek
17	MF	Ahmed Hassan	2 May 1975 (aged 28)		(Turkey) Beşiktaş
18	MF	Hossam Ghaly	15 December 1981 (aged 22)		(Netherlands) Feyenoord
19	FW	Abdel Haleem Ali	24 October 1973 (aged 30)		(Egypt) Zamalek
20	MF	Hadi Khachaba	19 December 1972 (aged 31)		(Egypt) Al-Ahly
21	MF	Hany Said	22 April 1980 (aged 23)		(Italy) Fiorentina
22	GK	Essam Mahmoud	20 June 1977 (aged 26)		(Egypt) ENPPI

=== Zimbabwe ===
Coach: Sunday Marimo

No.	Pos.	Player	Date of birth (age)	Caps	Club
1	GK	Energy Murambadoro	27 June 1982 (aged 21)		(Zimbabwe) CAPS United
2	DF	Dumisani Mpofu	20 December 1973 (aged 30)		(South Africa) Bush Bucks
3	MF	Esrom Nyandoro	6 February 1980 (aged 23)		(Zimbabwe) Amazulu
4	DF	Bekhitemba Ndlovu	9 August 1976 (aged 27)		(Zimbabwe) Highlanders
5	DF	Dazzy Kapenya	22 April 1976 (aged 27)		(Zimbabwe) Sporting Lions
6	DF	Kaitano Tembo	22 July 1970 (aged 33)		(South Africa) SuperSport United
7	MF	Leo Kurauzvione	5 December 1981 (aged 22)		(Zimbabwe) Dynamos
8	MF	Lazarus Muhone	31 August 1976 (aged 27)		(Zimbabwe) Black Rhinos
9	FW	Agent Sawu	24 October 1974 (aged 29)		(Zimbabwe) Dynamos
10	FW	Wilfred Mugeyi	4 July 1969 (aged 34)		(South Africa) Ajax Cape Town
11	MF	Charles Yohane	26 August 1973 (aged 30)		(South Africa) Wits University
12	FW	Peter Ndlovu	25 February 1973 (aged 30)		(England) Sheffield United
13	FW	Adam Ndlovu	26 June 1970 (aged 33)		(South Africa) Dynamos
14	DF	George Mbwando	20 October 1975 (aged 28)		(Germany) Alemannia Aachen
15	MF	Ronald Sibanda	29 August 1976 (aged 27)		(Zimbabwe) Amazulu
16	GK	Tapuwa Kapini	17 July 1984 (aged 19)		(Zimbabwe) Highlanders
17	DF	Harlington Shereni	6 July 1975 (aged 28)		(France) Guingamp
18	MF	Alois Bunjira	29 March 1975 (aged 28)		(South Africa) Wits University
19	GK	Ephrahim Mazarura	24 November 1986 (aged 17)		(Zimbabwe) Black Rhinos
20	MF	Tinashe Nengomasha	2 September 1982 (aged 21)		(South Africa) Kaizer Chiefs
21	FW	Joel Lupahla	26 April 1977 (aged 26)		(Cyprus) AEP Paphos
22	DF	Dickson Choto	19 March 1981 (aged 22)		(Poland) Legia Warsaw

== Group D ==
=== Benin ===
Coach: (Ghana) Cecil Jones Attuquayefio

No.	Pos.	Player	Date of birth (age)	Caps	Club
1	GK	Rachad Chitou	18 September 1976 (aged 27)		(Benin) Dragons
2	MF	Moussa Latoundji	13 August 1978 (aged 25)		(Germany) Energie Cottbus
3	DF	Adigo Dinalo	25 July 1972 (aged 31)		(Germany) Schönberg 95
4	DF	Samuel Emmanuel Suka	10 September 1983 (aged 20)		(Ghana) Liberty Professionals
5	DF	Damien Chrysostome	24 May 1982 (aged 21)		(Italy) Padova
6	MF	Jonas Okétola	27 August 1983 (aged 20)		(Benin) Dragons
7	MF	Romuald Boco	8 July 1985 (aged 18)		(France) Chamois Niortais
8	DF	Tony Toklomety	8 March 1984 (aged 19)		(Israel) Maccabi Netanya
9	FW	Laurent Djaffo	5 November 1970 (aged 33)		Unattached
10	FW	Oumar Tchomogo	7 January 1978 (aged 26)		(France) Guingamp
11	FW	Mouritala Ogunbiyi	10 October 1982 (aged 21)		(Nigeria) Enyimba International
12	DF	Félicien Singbo	25 October 1980 (aged 23)		(Scotland) Airdrie United
13	DF	Moustapha Agnidé	1 January 1981 (aged 23)		(France) Lorient
14	MF	Alain Gaspoz	16 May 1970 (aged 33)		(Switzerland) Aarau
15	DF	Anicet Adjamossi	15 March 1984 (aged 19)		(France) Bordeaux
16	GK	Maxime Agueh	1 April 1978 (aged 25)		(France) ASOA Valence
17	DF	Sylvain Remy	15 November 1980 (aged 23)		(France) Clermont
18	DF	Seydath Tchomogo	13 August 1985 (aged 18)		(Benin) Lions de l'Atakory
19	MF	Jocelyn Ahouéya	19 December 1985 (aged 18)		(Benin) Mogas 90
20	MF	Oladipupo Wassiou	17 December 1983 (aged 20)		(Benin) JS Pobe
21	FW	Rodrigue Akpakoun	16 December 1974 (aged 29)		Unattached
22	FW	Moussoro Kabirou	1 September 1983 (aged 20)		(France) Pau

=== Morocco ===
Coach: Badou Zaki

No.	Pos.	Player	Date of birth (age)	Caps	Club
1	GK	Khalid Fouhami	25 December 1972 (aged 31)		(Portugal) Académica de Coimbra
2	DF	Walid Regragui	23 September 1975 (aged 28)		(France) Ajaccio
3	DF	Akram Roumani	1 April 1978 (aged 25)		(Belgium) Genk
4	DF	Abdeslam Ouaddou	1 November 1978 (aged 25)		(France) Rennes
5	DF	Talal El Karkouri	8 July 1976 (aged 27)		(France) Paris Saint-Germain
6	DF	Noureddine Naybet	10 February 1970 (aged 33)		(Spain) Deportivo La Coruña
7	FW	Jaouad Zaïri	14 April 1982 (aged 21)		(France) Sochaux
8	MF	Abdelkarim Kissi	5 May 1980 (aged 23)		(Russia) Rubin Kazan
9	FW	Nabil Baha	12 October 1982 (aged 21)		(Portugal) Naval
10	MF	Mourad Hdiouad	10 September 1976 (aged 27)		(Bulgaria) Litex Lovech
11	FW	Moha	12 September 1977 (aged 26)		(Spain) Osasuna
12	GK	Tarik El Jarmouni	30 December 1977 (aged 26)		(Morocco) FAR
13	MF	Houssine Kharja	9 November 1982 (aged 21)		(Italy) Ternana
14	FW	Mustapha Bidoudane	18 June 1976 (aged 27)		(Morocco) Raja Casablanca
15	MF	Youssef Safri	13 January 1977 (aged 27)		(England) Coventry City
16	FW	Youssef Mokhtari	5 March 1979 (aged 24)		(Germany) Wacker Burghausen
17	FW	Marouane Chamakh	10 January 1984 (aged 20)		(France) Bordeaux
18	MF	Hassan Alla	24 November 1980 (aged 23)		(Morocco) Mouloudia Oujda
19	MF	Jamal Alioui	2 June 1982 (aged 21)		(Italy) Perugia
20	FW	Youssef Hadji	25 February 1980 (aged 23)		(France) Bastia
21	MF	Tariq Chihab	22 November 1975 (aged 28)		(Switzerland) Zürich
22	GK	Nadir Lamyaghri	13 February 1976 (aged 27)		(Morocco) Wydad

=== Nigeria ===
Head coach: Christian Chukwu

No.	Pos.	Player	Date of birth (age)	Caps	Club
1	GK	Vincent Enyeama	29 August 1982 (aged 21)		(Nigeria) Enyimba
2	MF	Joseph Yobo	6 September 1980 (aged 23)		(England) Everton
3	DF	Celestine Babayaro	29 August 1978 (aged 25)		(England) Chelsea
4	FW	Nwankwo Kanu	1 August 1976 (aged 27)		(England) Arsenal
5	DF	Isaac Okoronkwo	1 May 1978 (aged 25)		(England) Wolverhampton Wanderers
6	DF	Joseph Enakarhire	6 November 1982 (aged 21)		(Belgium) Standard Liège
7	FW	John Utaka	8 January 1982 (aged 22)		(France) Lens
8	FW	Yakubu	22 November 1982 (aged 21)		(England) Portsmouth
9	FW	Victor Agali	12 December 1978 (aged 25)		(Germany) Schalke 04
10	MF	Jay-Jay Okocha	14 August 1973 (aged 30)		(England) Bolton Wanderers
11	MF	Garba Lawal	22 May 1974 (aged 29)		(Sweden) Elfsborg
12	GK	Greg Etafia	30 September 1982 (aged 21)		(South Africa) Moroka Swallows
13	FW	Pius Ikedia	11 January 1980 (aged 24)		(Netherlands) Groningen
14	MF	Seyi Olofinjana	30 June 1980 (aged 23)		(Norway) Brann
15	DF	George Abbey	20 October 1978 (aged 25)		(England) Macclesfield Town
16	DF	Ifeanyi Udeze	21 July 1980 (aged 23)		(Greece) PAOK
17	FW	Julius Aghahowa	12 February 1982 (aged 21)		(Ukraine) Shakhtar Donetsk
18	DF	Romanus Orjinta	12 August 1981 (aged 22)		(Nigeria) Enyimba International
19	MF	Prince Ikpe Ekong	5 October 1978 (aged 25)		(Italy) Reggina
20	FW	Peter Odemwingie	15 July 1981 (aged 22)		(Belgium) La Louvière
21	FW	Emmanuel Ifeanyi Ekwueme	6 June 1982 (aged 21)		(Poland) Wisła Płock
22	GK	Austin Ejide	8 April 1984 (aged 19)		(Tunisia) Étoile du Sahel

=== South Africa ===
Head coach: April Phumo

No.	Pos.	Player	Date of birth (age)	Caps	Club
1	GK	André Arendse	27 June 1967 (aged 36)		(South Africa) Mamelodi Sundowns
2	DF	Thabang Molefe	11 April 1979 (aged 24)		(France) Le Mans
3	DF	Jacob Lekgetho	24 March 1974 (aged 29)		(Russia) Lokomotiv Moscow
4	DF	Aaron Mokoena	25 November 1980 (aged 23)		(Belgium) Genk
5	DF	Mbulelo Mabizela	16 September 1980 (aged 23)		(England) Tottenham Hotspur
6	MF	McBeth Sibaya	25 November 1977 (aged 26)		(Russia) Rubin Kazan
7	DF	David Kannemeyer	8 July 1977 (aged 26)		(South Africa) Kaizer Chiefs
8	MF	Bennett Mnguni	18 March 1974 (aged 29)		(Russia) Rostov
9	FW	Toni Nhleko	24 July 1979 (aged 24)		(United States) Dallas Burn
10	MF	Stanton Fredericks	13 June 1978 (aged 25)		(South Africa) Kaizer Chiefs
11	MF	Jabu Pule	11 July 1980 (aged 23)		(South Africa) Kaizer Chiefs
12	MF	Teboho Mokoena	10 July 1974 (aged 29)		(South Africa) Jomo Cosmos
13	MF	Benson Mhlongo	9 November 1980 (aged 23)		(South Africa) Wits University
14	FW	Siyabonga Nomvethe	2 December 1977 (aged 26)		(Italy) Udinese
15	MF	Sibusiso Zuma	23 June 1975 (aged 28)		(Denmark) Copenhagen
16	GK	Emile Baron	17 June 1979 (aged 24)		(Norway) Lillestrøm
17	DF	Neil Winstanley	25 August 1976 (aged 27)		(South Africa) Wits University
18	MF	Delron Buckley	7 December 1977 (aged 26)		(Germany) VfL Bochum
19	MF	John Moshoeu	18 December 1965 (aged 38)		(South Africa) Kaizer Chiefs
20	DF	Tony Coyle	29 October 1976 (aged 27)		(Russia) Rostov
21	FW	Patrick Mayo	15 May 1973 (aged 30)		(South Africa) Kaizer Chiefs
22	GK	Wayne Roberts	14 August 1977 (aged 26)		(South Africa) Wits University
