= List of Beninese people =

This article contains a list of notable Beninese people, in order by profession, followed by alphabetical order by last name. To be included in this list, the person must have a Wikipedia article.

== Actors, musicians, and entertainers ==
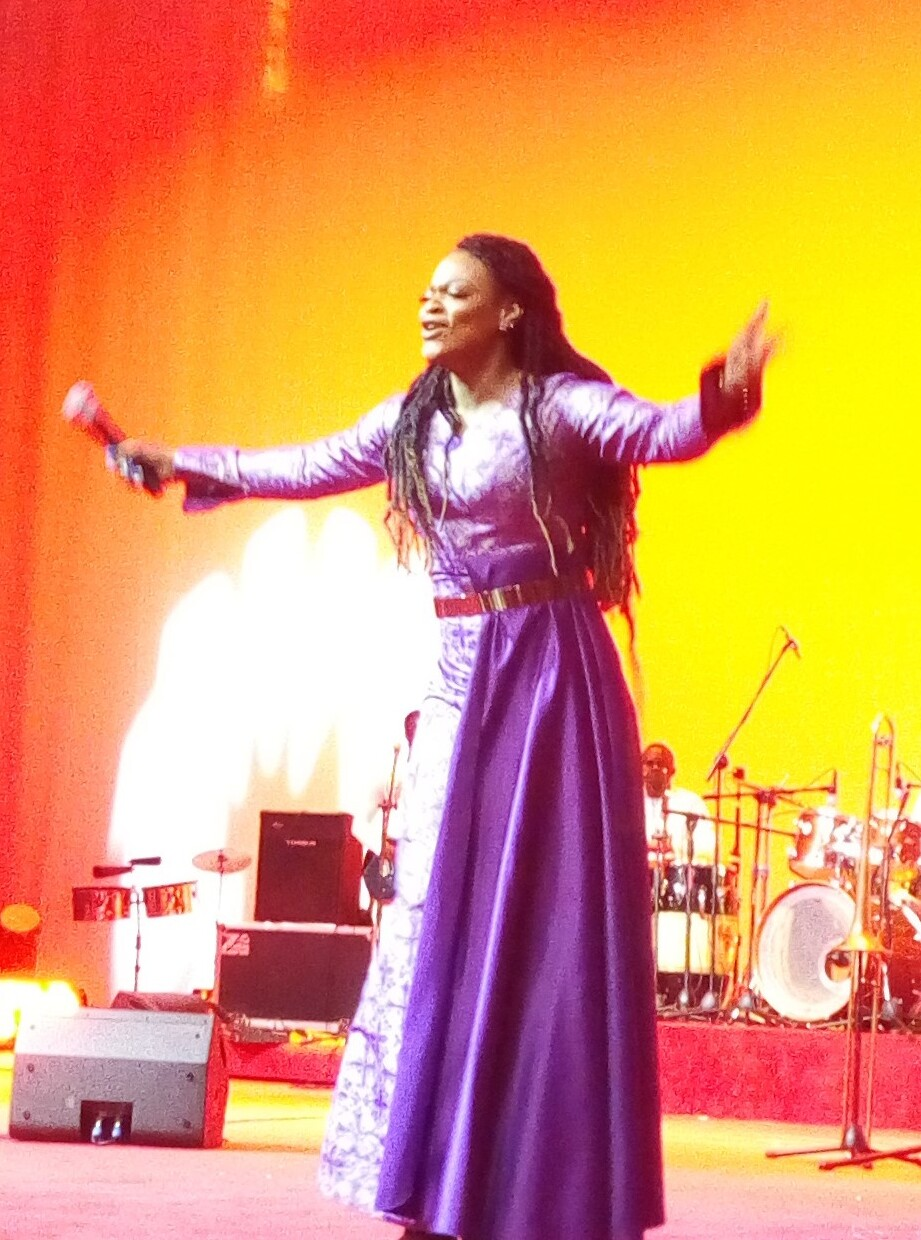
Zeynab Habib (born 1975)

- Marcelline Aboh (1940–2017), also known as Détin Bonsoir, filmmaker and actress
- Bella Agossou (born 1981), Beninese-born Spanish actress
- Angélique Kidjo (born 1960), Beninese-born French musician and actress
- Zeynab Habib (born 1975) Ivorian-born Beninese and Yoruba singer
- Djimon Hounsou (born 1964) Beninese-born American actor
- Eléphant Mouillé (born 1969) actor, singer
- Pipi Wobaho, actor, singer, comedian

== Politicians, activists, and political leaders ==
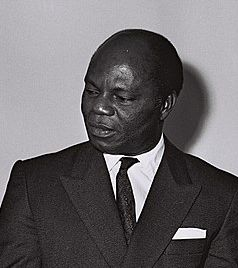
Justin Ahomadégbé-Tomêtin (1917–2002)

- Sikiratou Aguêmon (born 1948), politician and lawyer
- Justin Ahomadégbé-Tomêtin (1917–2002), president of the National Assembly of Dahomey, from 1959 to 1960
- Alphonse Alley (1930–1987), army officer and political figure
- Bruno Amoussou (born 1939), president of the National Assembly of Benin, from 1995 to 1999
- Sourou-Migan Apithy (1913–1989), president of Dahomey, from 1964 to 1965
- Martin Azonhiho, politician
- Rogatien Biaou (born 1952), politician and diplomat
- Thomas Boni Yayi (born 1951), president of Benin, from 2006 to 2016
- Corinne Amori Brunet, diplomat and politician
- Tahirou Congacou (1911–1993), president of the National Assembly of Dahomey, from 1964 to 1965
- Grace d'Almeida (1951–2005), lawyer, feminist, and human rights activist
- Mariam Boni Diallo (born 1952), minister of Foreign Affairs, from 10 April 2006 to 17 June 2007
- Frédéric Dohou (born 1961), politician
- Pascal Fantodji (?–2010), founder of the Communist Party of Benin (PCB), former professor
- Jerome Sacca Kina Guezere (1952–2005), politician
- Adrien Houngbédji (born 1942), politician
- Simon Idohou (born 1950), politician
- Mathieu Kérékou (1933–2015), president of Benin, from 1996 to 2006
- Maurice Kouandété (1932–2003), military officer and politician
- Hubert Maga (1916–2000), Dahomey politician, former president
- Théophile Nata (1947–2022), politician
- Pierre Osho (born 1945), politician
- Orou Gabé Orou Sego, politician
- Ismaël Tidjani Serpos, politician
- Seïdou Mama Sika (born 1949), politician
- Christophe Soglo (1909–1983), military officer and political leader
- Nicéphore Soglo (born 1934), politician
- Rosine Vieyra Soglo (1934–2021), politician
- Émile Derlin Zinsou (1918–2016), politician and physician, former president

== Sports people, and athletes ==
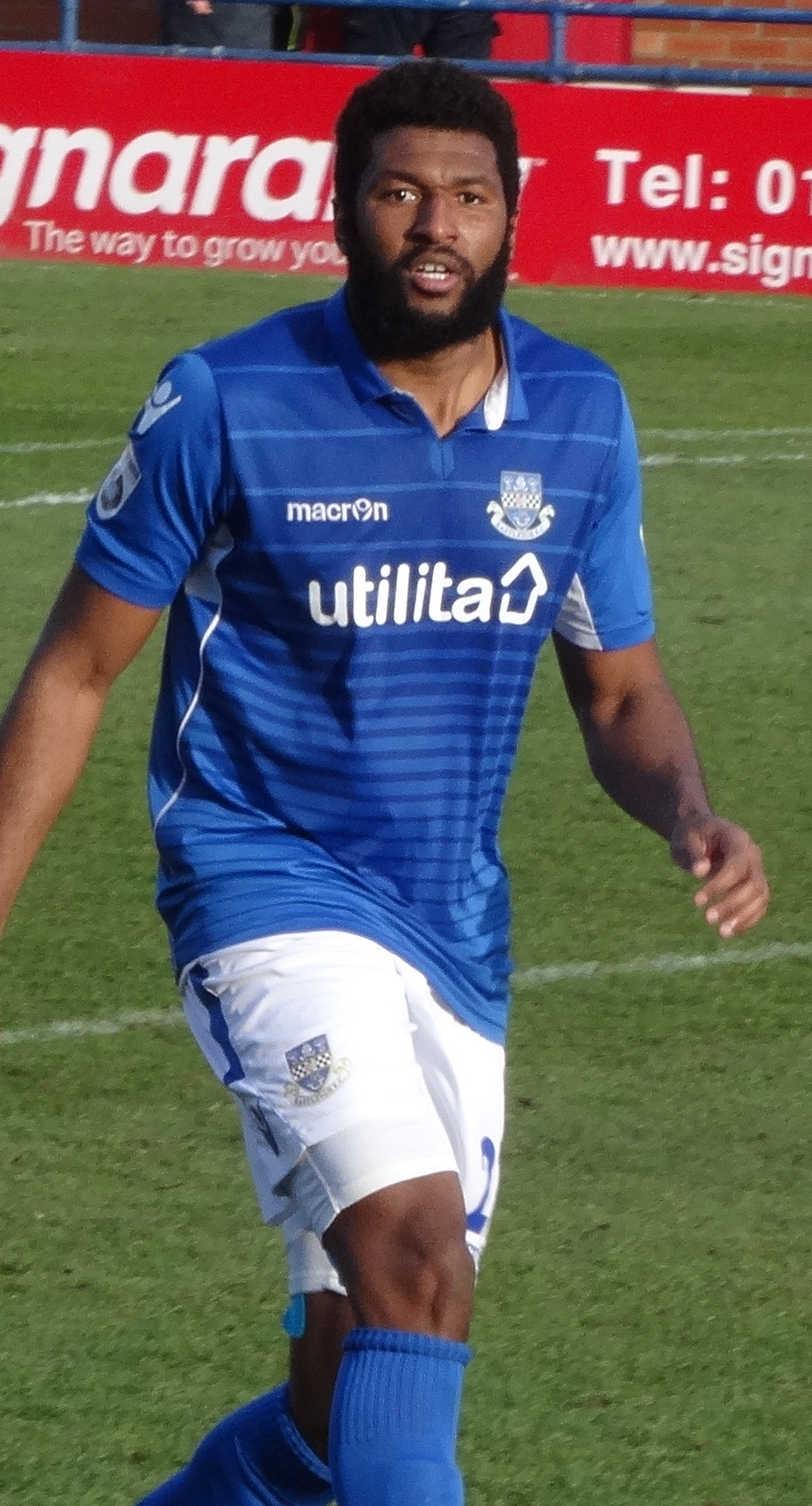
Réda Johnson (born 1988)

=== Footballers ===
- Dinalo Adigo (born 1972), former footballer and coach
- Anicet Adjamossi (born 1984), footballer
- Moustapha Agnidé (born 1981), footballer
- Maxime Agueh (born 1978), footballer
- Jocelyn Ahouéya (born 1985), footballer
- Rodrigue Akpakoun (born 1974), footballer
- Noëlle Amouzoun (born 1998), footballer
- Romuald Boco (born 1985), footballer
- Rachad Chitou (born 1976), footballer
- Damien Chrysostome (born 1982), footballer
- Laurent D'Jaffo (born 1970), footballer
- Alain Gaspoz (born 1970), footballer
- Aude Gbedjissi (born 1998), footballer
- Yolande Gnammi (born 2000), footballer
- Réda Johnson (born 1988), footballer
- Moussoro Kabirou (born 1983), footballer
- Moussa Latoundji (born 1978), former footballer, team manager
- Mouritala Ogunbiyi (born 1982), footballer
- Jonas Okétola (born 1983), footballer
- Wassiou Oladipupo (born 1983), footballer
- Sylvain Remy (born 1980), footballer
- Stéphane Sessègnon (born 1984), footballer
- Félicien Singbo (born 1980), footballer
- Samuel Emmanuel Suka (born 1983), footballer
- Oumar Tchomogo (born 1978), footballer
- Séïdath Tchomogo (born 1985), footballer
- Tony Toklomety (born 1984), footballer

=== Gymnasts ===
- Amdivie Kouhounha (born 2001), gymnast

=== Referees ===
- Coffi Codjia (born 1967), football referee

=== Swimmers ===
- Ionnah Eliane Douillet (born 2007), swimmer
- Gloria Koussihouede (born 1989), swimmer
- Alexis Kpadi (born 2005), swimmer
- Nafissath Radji (born 2002), swimmer
- Laraïba Seibou (born 2000), swimmer

== Writers ==
- Olympe Bhely-Quenum (born 1928), writer, journalist and magazine editor
- Lucille Clifton (1936–2010) American poet, of Benin heritage
- Jacob Egharevba (1893–1981) historian, traditional chief
- Paulin J. Hountondji (1942–2024), philosopher
- Karelle Vignon Vullierme (born 1987), food blogger

== Others ==
- Bernardin Gantin (1922–2008), Catholic cardinal
- Kojo Tovalou Houénou (1887–1936), Pan-Africanist intellectual and doctor
- Conceptia Ouinsou (1942–2011), lawyer, educator and politician
- Zomahoun Idossou Rufin (born 1964), Benin ambassador to Japan
- Arlette Dagnon Vignikin (born 1951), Benin ambassador to Scandinavia
