= Vignon =

Vignon is a surname. Notable people with the name include:

- Adjé Adjeoda Vignon (born 1955), Togolese sprinter
- Charlotte Vignon (1639–1700), French still life painter
- Claude Vignon (1593–1670), French painter, printmaker and illustrator
- Corinne Vignon (born 1963), French politician, member of the French National Assembly
- Élodie Vignon (born 1984), French pianist
- Jean-Jacques Vignon (born 1933), French rower
- Madame Vignon, French fashion designer
- Philippe Vignon (born 1942), French field hockey player
- Victor Vignon (1847–1909), French Impressionist landscape painter & graphic artist
- Karelle Vignon Vullierme, food blogger living in Dakar, Senegal

== See also ==
- Le Vignon-en-Quercy
