= Bekithemba =

Bekithemba is a Zimbabwean male given name. Notable people with the name include:

- Bhekithemba Maxwell Lubisi (1986–2023), South African politician
- Bekithemba Mpofu (born 1973), Zimbabwean real estate developer, academic and politician
- Bekithemba Ndlovu (born 1976), Zimbabwean footballer
