= Pfungwa =

Pfungwa is a Zimbabwean masculine given name. Notable people with the name include:

- Pfungwa Dziike (born 1972), Zimbabwean sculptor
- Pfungwa Mahefu (born 1982), Zimbabwean tennis player
