= Bizimana =

Bizimana is a surname. Notable people with the surname include:

- Augustin Bizimana (1954–2000), Rwandan politician
- Canesius Bizimana (born 1984), Rwandan footballer
- Didier Bizimana (born 1975), Burundian footballer
- Djihad Bizimana (born 1996), Rwandan footballer
- Édouard Bizimana (born 1968), Burundian diplomat and politician
- Jean-Damascène Bizimana (born 1950s), Rwandan diplomat
- Yusuf Bizimana (born 2000), British runner
