= Odede =

Odede is a surname. Notable people with the surname include:

- Elijah Odede (born 2007), Nigerian footballer
- Kennedy Odede (born 1984), Kenyan social entrepreneur and author
- Walter Odede (born 1974), Kenyan footballer
- Ọranyan (fl. 1200-1300s), legendary Yoruba king also known as Odede
