= Opiyo =

Opiyo is a surname. Notable people with the surname include:

- Levis Opiyo, Kenyan goalkeeper
- Nicholas Opiyo (born 1980), Ugandan human rights lawyer
- Peter Opiyo, Kenyan midfielder
- Philip Opiyo (born 1979), Kenyan footballer
- Samson Opiyo (born 1996), Kenyan para-athlete
