= Kamanzi =

Kamanzi is a surname. Notable people with the surname include:

- Didier Kamanzi, Rwandan actor
- Ernest Kamanzi, Rwandan politician
- Frank Mushyo Kamanzi, Rwandan United Nations official
- Karim Kamanzi (born 1983), Rwandan footballer
- Michel Kamanzi (born 1979), Rwandan footballer
- Warren Kamanzi (born 2000), Norwegian footballer
- Yves Kamanzi (born 1999), South African cricketer
