= Willis Ochieng =

Kenyan footballer (born 1981)

Personal information
- Full name: Willis Ochieng Oganyo
- Date of birth: 10 October 1981 (age 45)
- Place of birth: Mathare, Kenya
- Height: 1.90 m (6 ft 3 in)
- Position: Goalkeeper

Youth career
- 1997–2000: Chemelil Sugar

Senior career*
Years	Team	Apps	(Gls)
2001–2003	Mumias Sugar FC	51	(0)
2003–2005	Free State Stars	16	(0)
2006–2007	Skellefteå FF	0	(0)
2007–2010	IFK Mariehamn	16	(0)
2012	Western Stima	0	(0)

International career
2009	Kenya	5	(0)
- * Club domestic league appearances and goals

Willis Ochieng Oganyo (born 10 October 1981 in Mathare) is a Kenyan football player. The former goalkeeper is currently been involved with Gor Mahia, FCUK Zoo, Zetech clubs among others as a goalkeeper trainer. Owing to heavy accusations of match fixing, Gor Mahia and FCUK Zoo sacked him.

== Career ==
Ochieng played for Kenyan Premier League club Chemelil Sugar and Mumias Sugar FC, before moving to Free State Stars in South Africa where he played from 2003 to 2005. He joined Swedish club Skellefteå FF in 2006. In the middle of the 2007 season he moved to IFK Mariehamn and played eight matches for the club. The following year he started as the club's first keeper, but got injured in his sixth match which meant his season was over. He signed a three-year contract with the club after his first season in Finland.

Ochieng was reported to be playing for Tanzanian football club Simba. Finnish police is investigating the corruption case after he left IFK Mariehamn. Singaporean Wilson Raj Perumal is said to have paid 50 000 euros to Ochieng of possibly having allowed two times some easy goals. He signed a one-year contract with Western Stima as a free agent on 7 December 2012. It is reported he will play the role of goalkeeper coach as well as playing for the club.

Ochieng was part of the Kenyan squad that participated at the 2004 African Cup of Nations.
