= Charlotte Vignon =

French painter

- Born: 1639; Paris
- Died: c. 1700

Charlotte Vignon (1639 – c.1700) was a French still life painter.

Vignon was born in Paris as one of the children of the painter Claude Vignon and his first wife Charlotte de Leu, who was the daughter of the engraver Thomas de Leu. Her older siblings Philippe Vignon and Claude-Francois Vignon also became painters. Presumably she learned to paint with her family, but her unsigned oeuvre consists mostly of still life works in the manner of Louise Moillon. She married Joseph Régnault in 1655 and lived in Paris. In 1670, she was admitted to the Académie royale de peinture et de sculpture.

Her death is not recorded but she probably died around the same time as her brothers (1701-1703).

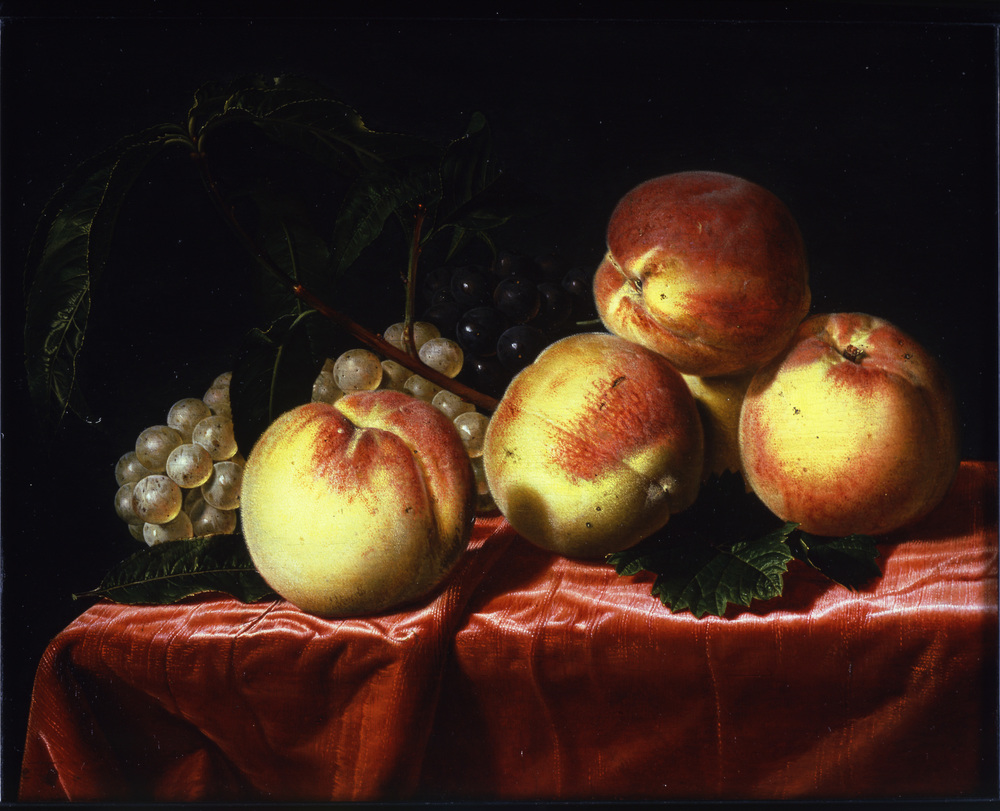
Peaches and Grapes on a Draped Table

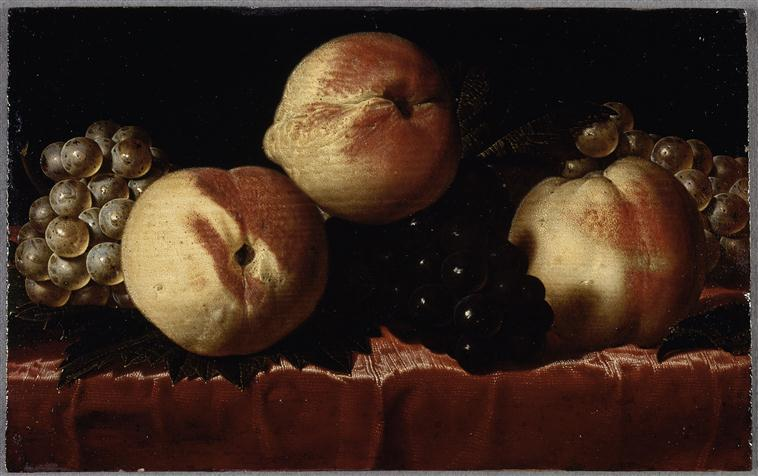
Peaches and Grapes, Rennes
