= Issa Kassim =

Kenyan footballer (born 1975)

Personal information
- Date of birth: 21 December 1975 (age 50)

Senior career*
Years	Team	Apps	(Gls)
- Mumias Sugar

International career
2000–2004	Kenya	26	(0)
- * Club domestic league appearances and goals

Issa Kassim (born 21 December 1975) is a Kenyan footballer. He played in 26 matches for the Kenya national football team from 2000 to 2004. He was also named in Kenya's squad for the 2004 African Cup of Nations tournament.
