= Ryan Adigo =

Beninese footballer (born 2001)

Personal information
- Full name: Ryan-Segon Adigo
- Date of birth: 15 April 2001 (age 25)
- Place of birth: Lübeck, Germany
- Height: 1.81 m (5 ft 11 in)
- Positions: Right winger; right back

Team information
- Current team: SGV Freiberg
- Number: 30

Youth career
- –2015: VfB Lübeck
- 2015–2017: Hamburger SV
- 2017–2020: Borussia Mönchengladbach

Senior career*
Years	Team	Apps	(Gls)
2020–2021	Borussia Mönchengladbach II	19	(0)
2021–2022	Würzburger Kickers	13	(0)
2022–2023	Phönix Lübeck	24	(0)
2023–2025	1. FC Lokomotive Leipzig	57	(5)
2025–	SGV Freiberg	16	(1)

International career^{‡}
2022–	Benin	1	(0)
- * Club domestic league appearances and goals as of 26 June 2026 ‡ National team caps and goals as of 8 June 2022

Ryan-Segon Adigo (born 15 April 2001) is a professional footballer who plays as a right winger or right back for Regionalliga Südwest club SGV Freiberg. Born in Germany, he plays for the Benin national team.

== Club career ==
On 7 September 2022, Adigo joined Regionalliga Nord club Phönix Lübeck after his former club Würzburger Kickers had suffered relegation from the 3. Liga.

== International career ==
Born in Germany, Adigo is Beninese by descent. He was called up to the Benin national team for matches in June 2022.

== Personal life ==
Adigo is the son of the retired Beninese footballer Dinalo Adigo.
