= Greg Etafia =

Nigerian football goalkeeper (born 1982)

Personal information
- Date of birth: 30 September 1982 (age 44)
- Place of birth: Auchi, Nigeria
- Height: 1.80 m (5 ft 11 in)
- Position: Goalkeeper

Senior career*
Years	Team	Apps	(Gls)
2000	NUB Kaduna		
2000–2001	Lobi Stars		
2001–2003	Plateau United		
2003–2015	Moroka Swallows	198	(0)
2019	Highlands Park	0	(0)

International career
2003	Nigeria	4	(0)

Managerial career
- 2016: Moroka Swallows (caretaker)
- 2016–2017: Cape Town All Stars
- * Club domestic league appearances and goals

Greg Etafia (born 30 September 1982) is a Nigerian former professional footballer who played as a goalkeeper.

== Playing career ==
Etafia played for Lobi Stars in the CAF Champions League and the Nigeria under-23 national team which participated in the 2000 Summer Olympics.

Etafia played for Moroka Swallows in South Africa from 2003 until 2015.

He made four appearances for the Nigeria national team.

== Coaching career ==
A few weeks after retiring in the summer 2015, it was announced that Etafia would continue at Moroka Swallows, but as a goalkeeper coach. On 8 March 2016, Etafia was appointed caretaker manager of the club for the rest of the season.

On 21 September 2016, Etafia moved to Cape Town All Stars, accepting a goalkeeper coaching position. Two months later, at the end of October 2016, Etafia was appointed caretaker once again. In his time in charge, Etafia moved All Stars off the bottom of the standings to the first position of safety in 14th place, while guiding the club to the last 32 of the Nedbank Cup. In the beginning of January 2017, the club announced that he would continue as the club's manager. However, he left the club few days later.

In May 2017, he joined Baroka F.C. as a goalkeeper coach. He left the club one year later, May 2018, when a new coach arrived with his own technical staff.

Four years after retiring from playing football, Etafia signed with Highlands Park F.C. on 17 July 2019.

On 7 October 2021, Etafia was appointed goalkeeper coach at TS Galaxy.
