= Jean-Paul Habyarimana =

Rwandan footballer

Personal information
- Date of birth: 17 August 1982 (age 44)

International career
Years	Team	Apps	(Gls)
2002–2004	Rwanda	3	(0)

Jean-Paul Habyarimana (born 17 August 1982) is a Rwandan footballer. He played in three matches for the Rwanda national football team from 2002 to 2004. He was also named in Rwanda's squad for the 2004 African Cup of Nations tournament.
