= Leo Kurauzvione =

Zimbabwean footballer (born 1981)

Personal information
- Date of birth: 5 December 1981 (age 44)
- Place of birth: Harare, Zimbabwe
- Height: 1.76 m (5 ft 9 in)
- Position: Midfielder

Senior career*
Years	Team	Apps	(Gls)
2002–2004	Dynamos		
2004–2005	Legia Warsaw	1	(0)
2005	Dynamos		
2006–2009	Shooting Stars		
2010–2012	Dynamos		
2011	→ Zimbabwe Saints (loan)		
2013–2015	Triangle United		

International career
2003–2005	Zimbabwe	11	(0)
- * Club domestic league appearances and goals

Leo Kurauzvione (born 5 December 1981 in Harare) is a Zimbabwean former professional footballer who played as a midfielder.

Kurauzvione played professional football in Zimbabwe and Poland, appearing for Dynamos F.C., Shooting Stars F.C. and Legia Warsaw.
