= Patrick Mbeu =

Rwandan footballer

Personal information
- Date of birth: 9 March 1986 (age 40)
- Place of birth: Cameroon
- Position: Goalkeeper

Senior career*
Years	Team	Apps	(Gls)
- APR

International career
2003	Rwanda	1	(0)
- * Club domestic league appearances and goals

Patrick Mbeu (born 9 March 1986) is a Rwandan former footballer who is last known to have played as a goalkeeper for APR.

== Career ==
Born in Cameroon, Mbeu was naturalized to play for Rwanda.

In 2007, he played for France at the Homeless World Cup.
