= Olivier Nzuzi =

Congolese footballer

Personal information
- Full name: Olivier Nzuzi Niati Polo
- Date of birth: 16 September 1980 (age 46)
- Place of birth: Kinshasa, Zaire
- Height: 1.73 m (5 ft 8 in)
- Position: Right winger

Senior career*
Years	Team	Apps	(Gls)
1997	FC Renaissance		
1997–1999	RWD Molenbeek	5	(1)
1999–2001	Excelsior Mouscron	31	(2)
2001–2002	Cercle Brugge	31	(8)
2002–2005	SW Bregenz	83	(8)
2005–2007	Sturm Graz	35	(9)
2007–2008	UR Namur	25	(3)
2010–2011	RFC Luingnois		
2011–2012	KSC Menen		
Total		210+	(31+)

International career
1997–2004	DR Congo	5	(0)
- * Club domestic league appearances and goals

Olivier Nzuzi Niati Polo (born 16 September 1980) is a Congolese football player.

He was part of the Congolese 2004 African Nations Cup team, who finished bottom of their group in the first round of competition, thus failing to secure qualification for the quarter-finals.
