= Andrew Oyombe =

Kenyan footballer (born 1985)

Personal information
- Full name: Andrew Oyombe Opiyo
- Date of birth: 24 February 1985 (age 41)
- Place of birth: Nairobi, Kenya
- Height: 1.82 m (6 ft 0 in)
- Position: Defender

Senior career*
Years	Team	Apps	(Gls)
- Tusker
2004–2006	Enköping	21	(1)
2007–2008	Gor Mahia		
2009	Mathare United		
2010	Sofapaka	3	(0)
2011	Skärhamns	4	(0)

International career
2004–2008	Kenya	13	(0)
- * Club domestic league appearances and goals

Andrew Oyombe (born 24 February 1985) is a Kenyan footballer. He played in 13 matches for the Kenya national football team from 2004 to 2008. He was also named in Kenya's squad for the 2004 African Cup of Nations tournament.

Oyombe moved to Sweden in 2004 after being given an opportunity by second-tier side Enköping. He went back to Kenya after a few years only to return to Sweden as a subsequently joining Skärhamns.
