= Frédéric Rusanganwa =

Rwandan footballer

Personal information
- Date of birth: 4 April 1980 (age 46)

Senior career*
Years	Team	Apps	(Gls)
- Mukura Victory
- APR

International career
2002–2004	Rwanda	2	(0)
- * Club domestic league appearances and goals

Frédéric Rusanganwa (born 4 April 1980) is a Rwandan footballer. He played in two matches for the Rwanda national football team from 2002 to 2004. He was also named in Rwanda's squad for the 2004 African Cup of Nations tournament.
