= Seïdou Mama Sika =

Beninese politician (born 1949)

Seïdou Mama Sika (born 1949 in Nikki, Benin) was the Minister of the Interior of Benin from February 9, 2005 until April 2006. He attended the Lycée Technique in Cotonou. He became an air brigade general in 1999.
