= Fousseiny Tangara =

Malian footballer (born 1978)

Personal information
- Date of birth: 12 June 1978 (age 48)
- Place of birth: Bamako, Mali
- Height: 1.83 m (6 ft 0 in)
- Position: Goalkeeper

Senior career*
Years	Team	Apps	(Gls)
1998–1999	FC Versailles 78		
1999–2000	CA Paris-Charenton		
2000–2001	FC Les Lilas		
2001–2005	FC Mantes	88	(0)
2005–2007	Amiens	7	(0)
2007	Lamia	8	(0)
2008	Gueugnon	7	(0)
2008–2009	AS Beauvais Oise	5	(0)
2009–2010	AC Amiens	17	(0)
2010–2011	US Centre Haine-Saint-Pierre		
2011–2015	Union sportive de Breteuil		

International career
2004–2006	Mali	21	(0)
- * Club domestic league appearances and goals

Fousseiny Tangara (born 12 June 1978) is a Malian former professional footballer who played as a goalkeeper.

== Early life ==
Tangara was born in Bamako. His parents moved to Vanves, Hauts-de-Seine, France when he was aged six months. He holds both Malian and French nationalities.

== Playing career ==
He began playing football with lower league sides FC Versailles 78, FC Les Lilas and FC Mantes, before moving up to play in Ligue 2 with Amiens SC.

He was part of the Malian 2004 Olympic football team, who exited in the quarter finals, finishing top of group A, but losing to Italy in the next round.
