= Claude Vignon =

French painter (1593–1670)

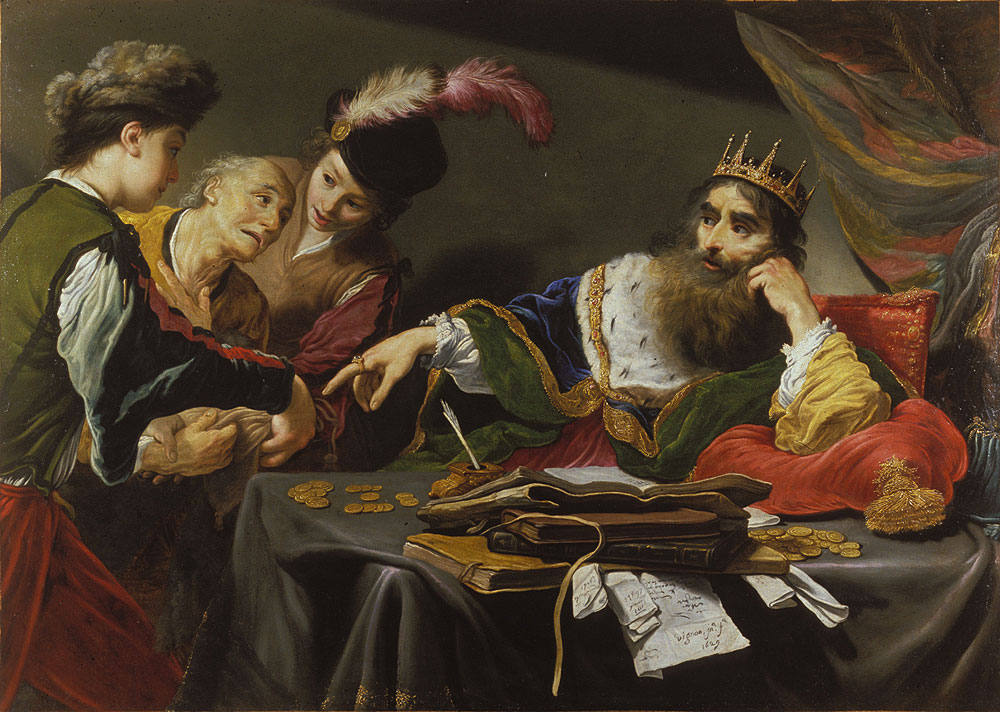
Parable of the Unforgiving Servant, 1629

Claude Vignon (19 May 1593 – 10 May 1670) was a French painter, printmaker and illustrator who worked in a wide range of genres. During a period of study in Italy, he became exposed to many new artistic currents, in particular through the works of Caravaggio and his followers, Guercino, Guido Reni and Annibale Caracci. A prolific artist, his work has remained enigmatic, contradictory and hard to define within a single term or style. His mature works are vibrantly coloured, splendidly lit and often extremely expressive. Vignon worked in a fluent technique, resulting in an almost electric brushwork. He particularly excelled in the rendering of textiles, gold and precious stones.

== Life ==
Claude Vignon was born into a wealthy family in Tours, Touraine, France. He received his initial artistic training in Paris from the Mannerist painter Jacob Bunel, a representative of the Second School of Fontainebleau. Although Vignon is not actually documented in Rome until 1618–19 he was probably based there throughout that decade. He likely travelled to Rome as early as 1609–10. Here he formed part of the French community of painters, including Simon Vouet and Valentin de Boulogne, both prominent members of the Caravaggisti, artists working in a style influenced by Caravaggio.

Vignon returned to his home country in 1616 where he became member of the Painter's Guild of Paris in that year. He travelled a second time to Rome the next year. He also visited Spain, where he was reportedly attacked by 8 bandits in Barcelona, one of whom wounded him in the face.

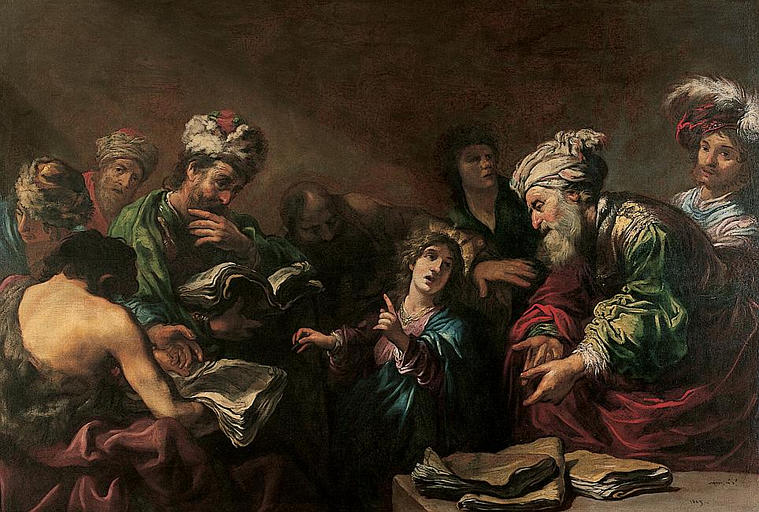
Christ among the doctors, 1623

Back in France in 1623, he married in 1624 Charlotte de Leu, the daughter of the engraver Thomas de Leu. Following his return to Paris he became one of the city's most respected, productive and successful artists. His patrons included King Louis XIII and Cardinal Richelieu. He also worked for ecclesiastical patrons as well as for private clients. He became a business associate of the print publisher and art dealer François Langlois. While the great decorative schemes of the day went to other painters such as Simon Vouet who had returned to France in 1627 and Philippe de Champaigne, Vignon continued to enjoy wide patronage and was highly sought after by the circle of the renowned literary salon of the Hôtel de Rambouillet. Anne, Duchesse de Longueville commissioned him to decorate the gallery at the Château du Thorigny between 1651 and 1653.

After the death of his first wife he married Geneviève Ballard in 1644. He is said to have fathered 35 children, 24 of whom are documented. Some of his children became painters in their father's workshop: amongst them his sons Claude the Younger (1633–1703) and Philippe (1638–1701) and his daughter Charlotte (1639–?).

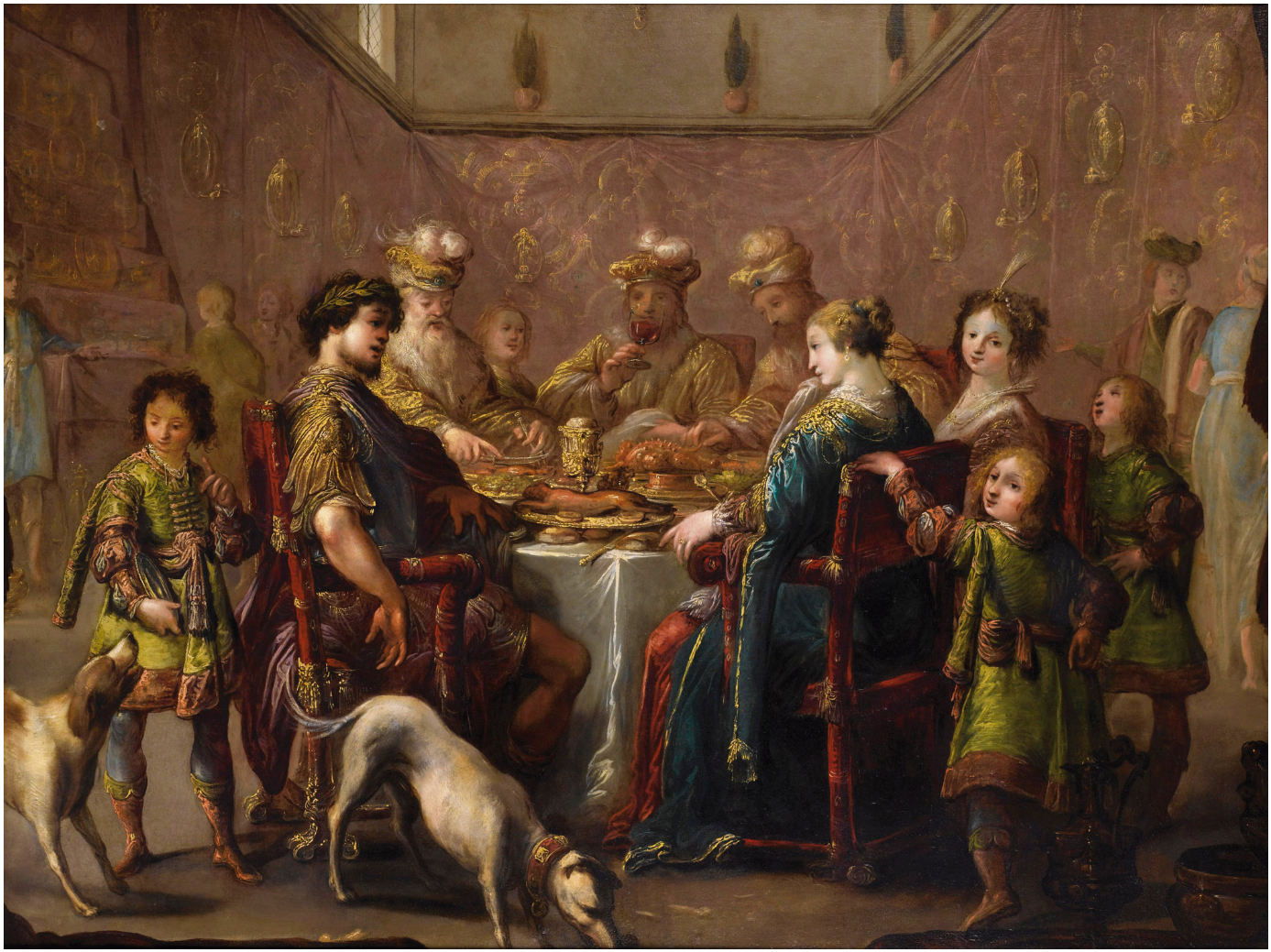
Banquet scene, 1630s

Vignon was admitted to the Académie royale de peinture et de sculpture in 1651. His last dated work is dated 1656.

== Work ==
Vignon painted portraits, genre scenes and religious works. Claude Vignon was a very versatile artist who assimilated elements of various styles from Mannerism to Venetian, Dutch and German art. Important influences on his style were the works of the Venetian Caravaggesque painter Domenico Fetti, the German Adam Elsheimer, and the Dutchmen Jacob Pynas, Pieter Lastman and many others. His style likely owes most to the eccentric style of Leonaert Bramer except that Vignon worked on a much grander scale than typically found in Bramer's paintings. Another important influence was Caravaggio's most direct follower Bartolomeo Manfredi. The multiple influences have made his work enigmatic, contradictory, complex and hard to define within a single term or style. Some art historians regard him as a precursor of Rembrandt.

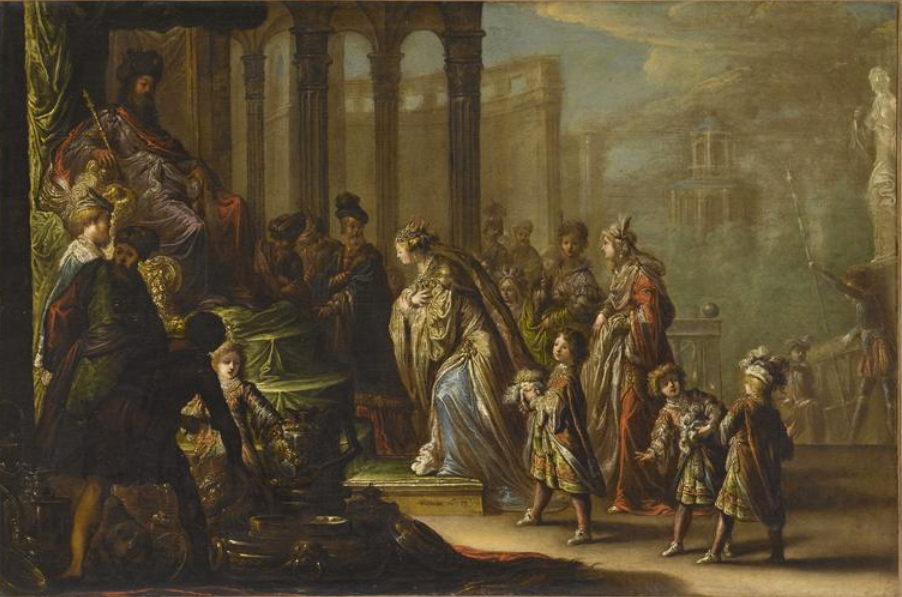
Solomon and the Queen of Sheba, 1624

He started out in a Mannerist style and was then influenced by Carravagism during his stay in Rome. In Rome he is known to have created a number of single figure paintings depicting male saints reading or writing. An example is the St. John the Evangelist (At Christie's on 25 May 2005, New York, lot 38). This composition is particularly Caravaggesque in its representation of the light source, which shines down onto St. John, thus illuminating his face and hands and casting the folds of his cloak into dynamic patterns of light and shadow.

By the 1620s his work had started to reflect elements of both Venetian colouring and Jacques Bellange's Northern Mannerist conventions. In the mid-1620s he vacillated between various styles, in some paintings showing a more Caravaggist bent such as in the Christ among the doctors (1623, Museum of Grenoble) or the Vision of St Jerome (1616, Nationalmuseum, Stockholm). Other works are more reserved, while some have a clear Baroque vigor such as the Triumph of St Ignatius (1628, Musée des Beaux-Arts d'Orléans). A pivotal work from this period is the Solomon and the Queen of Sheba (1624, Louvre), which displays his taste for the exotic and for theatrical arrangements and uses a thick, encrusted impasto, shot through with golden highlights and an unusual combination of colours.

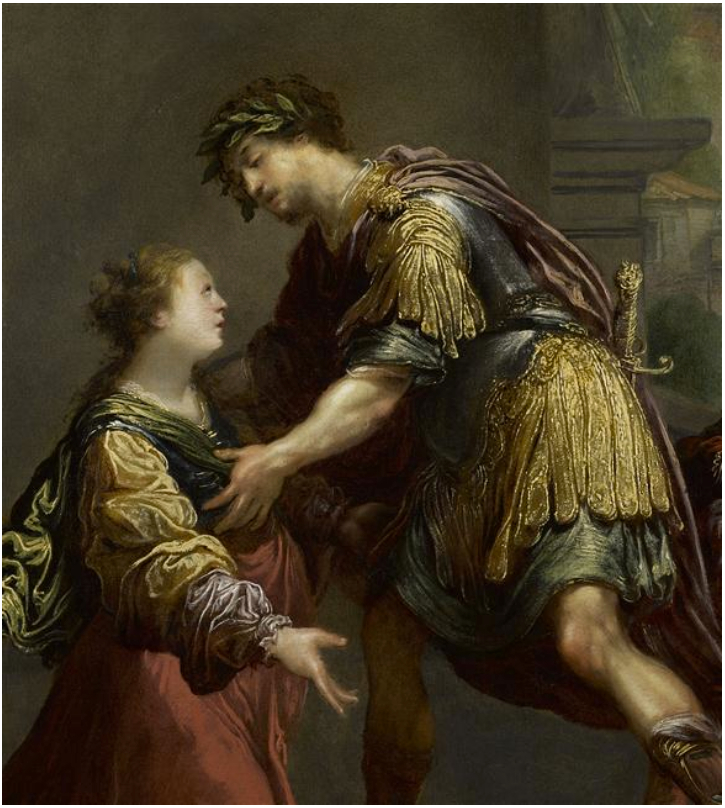
Pregnant young woman begging justice from a warrior

In the period 1630-1640 when the artist worked in Paris his palette became richer. He used rich tonalities, such as pink, blue, gold and bursts of red colour on soft gray background in his compositions. He relied on an original technique by executing his work in two successive stages: first he made a quick outline of the composition and then he painstakingly rendered the fabrics and jewelry, giving the material greater consistency and relief. It was by relying on this technique that Vignon was able to establish a great reputation for the speed at which he painted. It also allowed him to produce the great number of paintings for which he is known. The paintings of this period still hold reminiscences of Vignon's Caravaggesque period but are overlaid with a new decorative sensuality, which reflects a new sensibility emerging in Paris at that time. An example of a work of this period is the Banquet Scene (At Sotheby's on 22 June 2010 in Paris, lot 19).

His works of the period 1640–50 are characterised by their rich coloring, bejeweled surface and theatrical mannerism. His compositions are bathed in a strange, sepulchral moonlight and executed in shimmering, encrusted paint which sometimes takes on the appearance of intricately chased silver. It is for these characteristics that Vignon has sometimes been called a 'pre-Rembrandtist' painter.

Vignon was active as an etcher throughout his career. He showed the same high level of technical skill in his printed works as in his paintings. He was one of the most prominent printmakers in 17th century France. He also produced illustrations for publications by the French writers of the précieuses literary circle.
