= Ramadhani Nkunzingoma =

Rwandan footballer

Personal information
- Date of birth: 2 September 1977 (age 49)

International career
Years	Team	Apps	(Gls)
2002–2007	Rwanda	22	(0)

Ramadhani Nkunzingoma (born 2 September 1977) is a Rwandan footballer. He played in 22 matches for the Rwanda national football team from 2002 to 2007. He was also named in Rwanda's squad for the 2004 African Cup of Nations tournament.
