= Romanus Orjinta =

Nigerian footballer (1981–2014)

Personal information
- Date of birth: 12 August 1981
- Place of birth: Nigeria
- Date of death: 31 December 2014 (aged 33)
- Place of death: Enugu, Nigeria
- Height: 1.85 m (6 ft 1 in)
- Position: Defender

Senior career*
| Years | Team | Apps | (Gls) |
| 2000–2001 | Enugu Rangers | 32 | (13) |
| 2001–2002 | Julius Berger F.C. | | |
| 2003 | Enyimba International | | |
| 2004 | Lillestrøm SK | 0 | (0) |
| 2005–2008 | Heartland F.C. | | |
| 2008–? | Niger Tornadoes | | |

International career
| 2003–2004 | Nigeria | 13 | (0) |
- * Club domestic league appearances and goals

Romanus Orjinta (12 August 1981 – c. 31 December 2014) was a Nigerian professional footballer who played as a defender.

== Career ==
In 2003, Orjinta was the captain from Enyimba International before transferred to Lillestrøm SK. In 2007 through his Egyptian agent Mohamed Mohsen, the player was going to sign with the Egyptian club Zamalek but the club dismissed the contract with him after the medical examination found "health issues". On 26 August 2008, he returned to playing with Niger Tornadoes.

On New Year's Eve 2014, Orjinta was found dead in his home.

== Honours ==
Enyimba International

- CAF Champions League: 2003
