= Dazzy Kapenya =

Zimbabwean footballer (born 1976)

Dezidelio Kapenya
Personal information
- Full name: Dezidelio Kapenya
- Date of birth: 22 April 1976 (age 50)
- Position: Defender

Senior career*
Years	Team	Apps	(Gls)
–2002	Highlanders		
2003	Sporting Lions		
2004	Amazulu		
2004–2005	Manning Rangers		
2006	Highlanders		

International career
2000–2004	Zimbabwe	19	(0)
- * Club domestic league appearances and goals

Dezidelio Kapenya (born 22 April 1976) is a retired Zimbabwean football defender. A Zimbabwe international, he played at the 2000 and 2003 COSAFA Cup and the 2004 African Cup of Nations.
