= Jean Rémy Bitana =

Rwandan footballer

Personal information
- Date of birth: 5 May 1984 (age 42)
- Place of birth: Rubavu, Rwanda
- Height: 1.70 m (5 ft 7 in)
- Position: Defender

Senior career*
Years	Team	Apps	(Gls)
1999–2000	Etincelles		
2000–2006	Rayon Sports		

International career
2003–2004	Rwanda	5	(0)
- * Club domestic league appearances and goals

Jean Rémy Bitana (born 5 May 1984) is a Rwandan footballer who played five matches for the Rwanda national football team in 2003 and 2004, including three in the 2004 African Cup of Nations tournament.
