= Ibrahima Koné (footballer, born 1977) =

Malian footballer

Personal information
- Full name: Ibrahima Koné
- Date of birth: 6 October 1977 (age 49)
- Place of birth: Bamako, Mali
- Position: Defender

Senior career*
Years	Team	Apps	(Gls)
1997–2003	ES Darsalam Bamako		
2003–2005	ASC Jeanne d'Arc		
2005–2006	KS Dinamo Tirana	21	(0)
2006–2008	?		
2008–2009	Stade Malien de Bamako		

International career
1998–2006	Mali	2	(0)
- * Club domestic league appearances and goals

Ibrahima Koné (born 6 October 1977) is a Malian football player who last played for Stade Malien de Bamako.
