= Simon Idohou =

Beninese diplomat (born 1950)

Simon Bodéhoussè Idohou (born 23 May 1950) was the Permanent Representative (or Ambassador) for Benin to the United Nations from 2005 to 2006.

In the Armed Forces Health Service of Benin, Idohou was Director of the Electroradiology Service from 1991 to 1999, Director of the Armed Forces Teaching Hospital of Cotonou from 1996 to 1998, deputy director of the Armed Forces Health Service from 1999 to 2000, and Director of the Armed Forces Health Service from 2000 to 2002. He then became Director of the Centre for Medical Imaging in Cotonou in 2002, where he remained until his appointment as Permanent Representative to the UN. He presented his credentials to the Secretary-General of the United Nations on 8 September 2005, replacing Joel Wassi Adechi.

As Permanent Representative, Idohou sat on the United Nations Security Council in 2005 when Benin held one of the rotating positions. He was replaced as Permanent Representative by Jean-Marie Ehouzou in 2006.
