= Dumisani Mpofu =

Zimbabwean footballer (born 1973)

Personal information
- Date of birth: 20 December 1973 (age 52)
- Height: 1.86 m (6 ft 1 in)
- Position: Defender

Senior career*
Years	Team	Apps	(Gls)
–1996	Rufaro Rovers F.C.		
1997–1998	Blackpool		
1999–2001	CAPS United		
2001–2006	Bush Bucks		
2006–2008	Western Province United		

International career
1996–2006	Zimbabwe		
- * Club domestic league appearances and goals

Dumisani Mpofu (born 20 December 1973) is a retired Zimbabwean football defender. A Zimbabwe international, he played at the 1999, 2001, 2003 and 2004 and 2004 African Cup of Nations.
