= Thomas de Leu =

Engraver (1560–1612)

Thomas de Leu or Leeuw or Le Leup or Deleu (1560–1612) was a French engraver, publisher, and print dealer of Flemish origin.

== Life ==
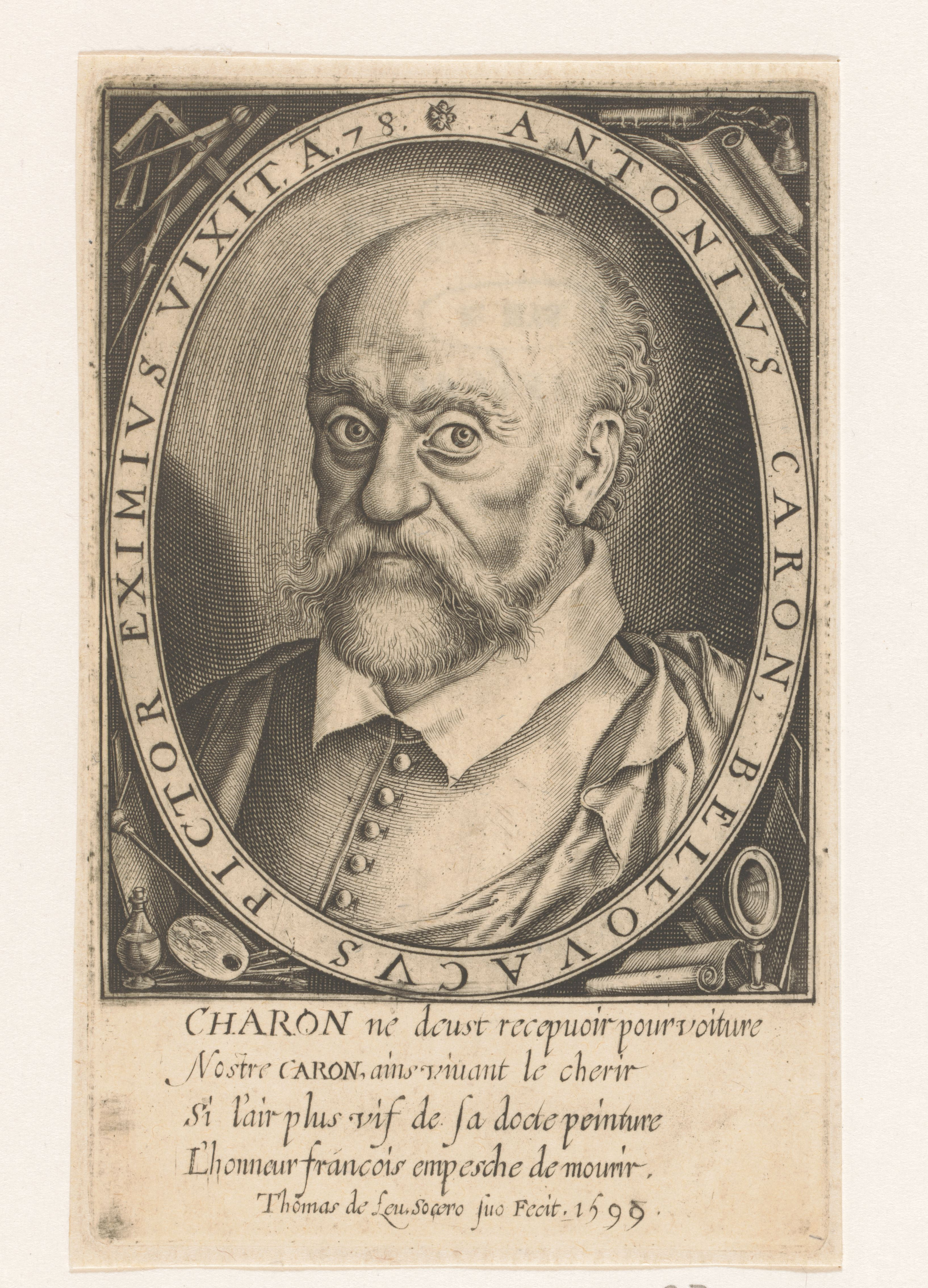
Antoine Caron, engraving by Thomas de Leu

He was the son of a print dealer in Oudenaarde and began his career in Antwerp, where he worked for Jean Ditmar (c. 1538–1603) and was influenced by the Wierix.

Sometime after 1576 and before 1580 he went to Paris to work for the painter and engraver Jean Rabel (1540/50–1603).

On 22 August 1583 he married Marie Caron, daughter of Antoine Caron, one of the principal painters of the Second School of Fontainebleau. Although it has been stated that he was thereby the brother-in-law of the engraver Léonard Gaultier, this is probably not the case.

In the Wars of Religion he managed to switch from the side of the Catholic League to that of Henry IV. As a result, he became enormously wealthy, running a highly productive workshop and publishing numerous prints by other artists. His apprentices included Jacques Honnervogt (fl 1608–1635) and Melchior Tavernier.

On 22 May 1605 he married Charlotte Bothereau. His daughter Charlotte married Claude Vignon. He died in Paris.

== Work ==
His first dated engraving is Justice (1579; Linzeler no. 57). He produced more than 300 plates of portraiture, including ones of Catherine de' Medici (Linzeler no. 255) and Sir Francis Drake, and many engravings on religious subjects, such as Christ in Blessing (1598; Linzeler no. 7) and a set of 25 plates depicting The Life of Saint Francis. He also provided illustrations for books.

Portraits engraved by Thomas de Leu

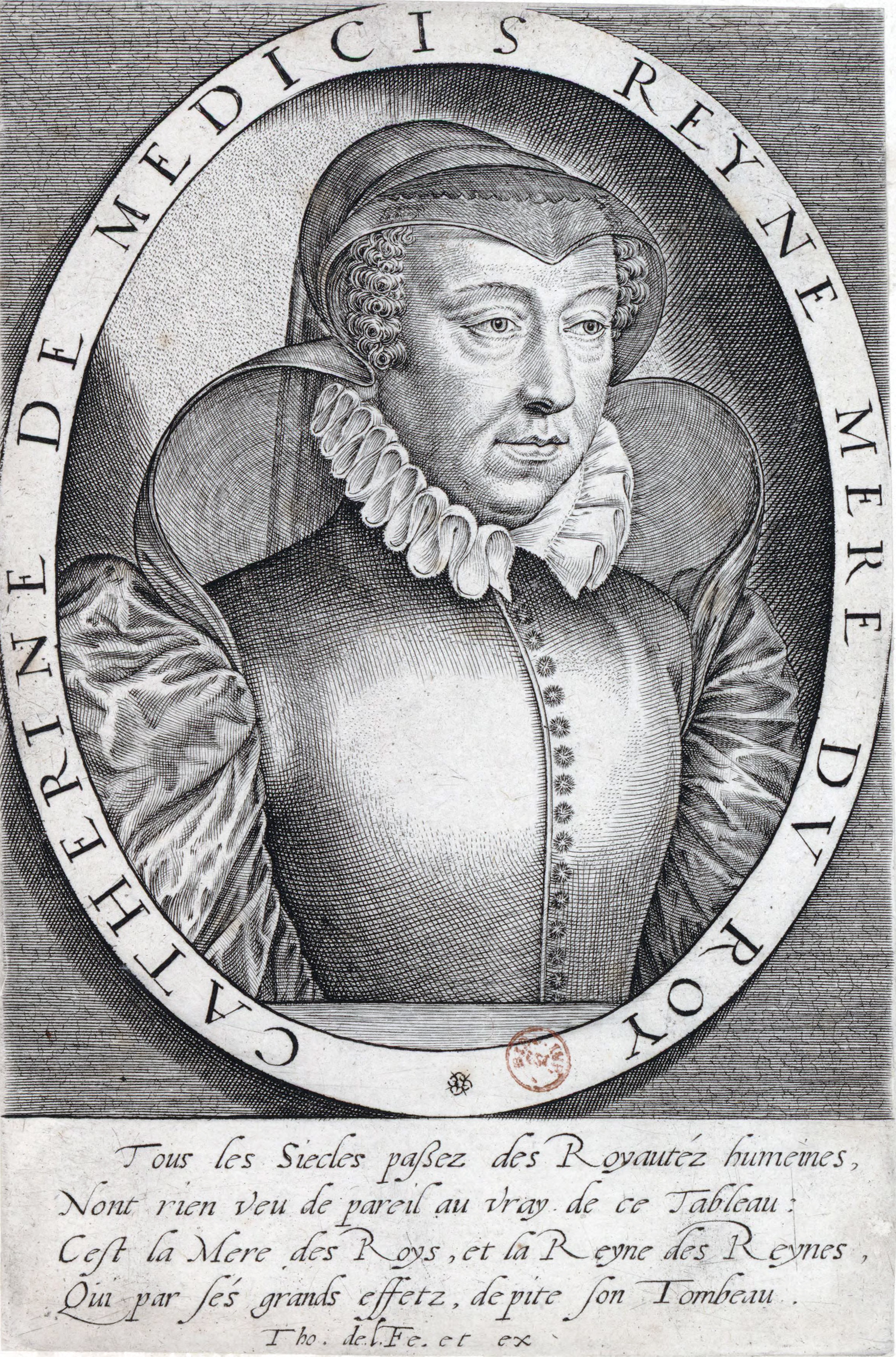
Catherine de Médicis

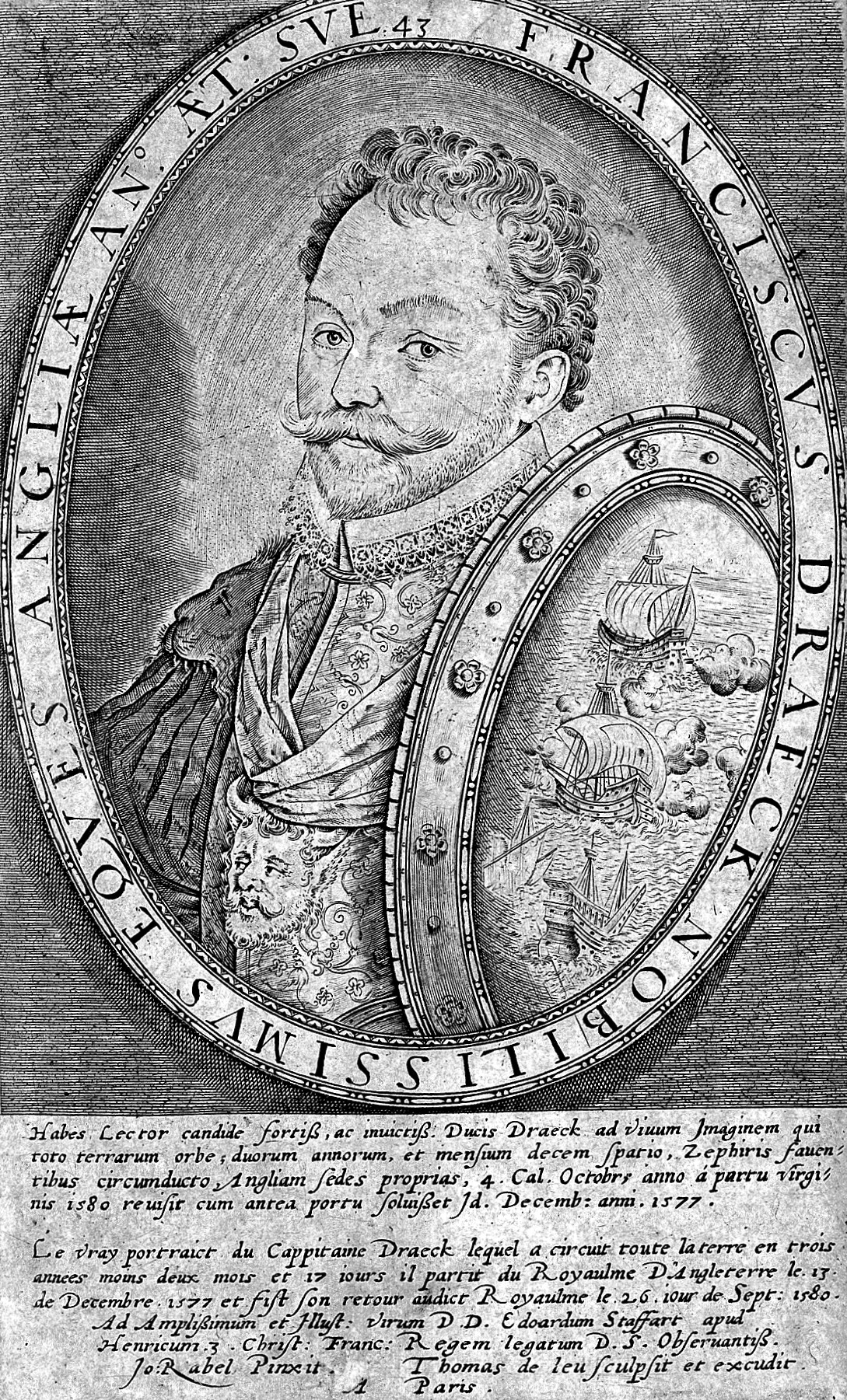
Sir Francis Drake, after Jean Rabel

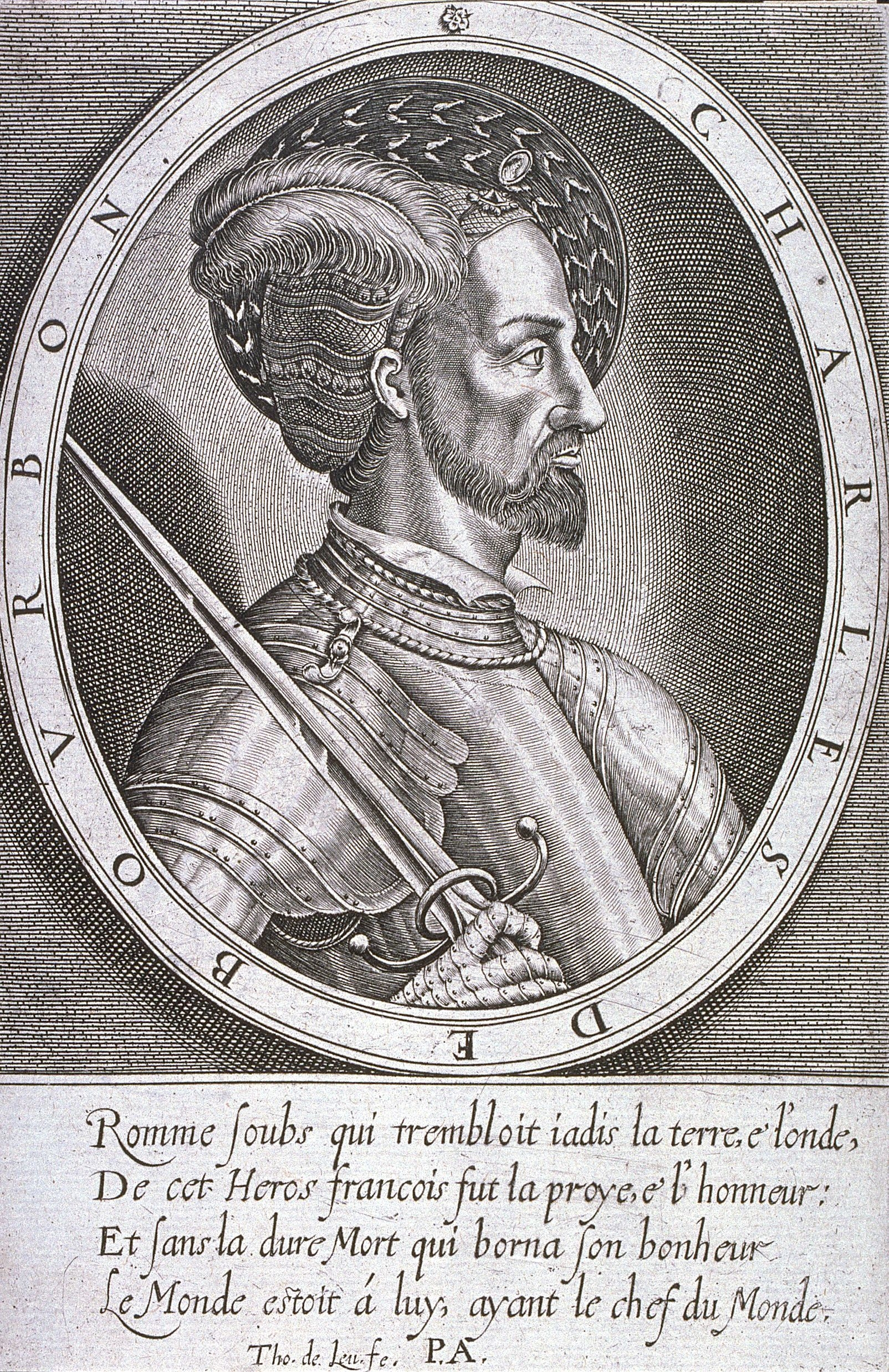
Charles III de Bourbon
Religious subjects engraved by Thomas de Leu

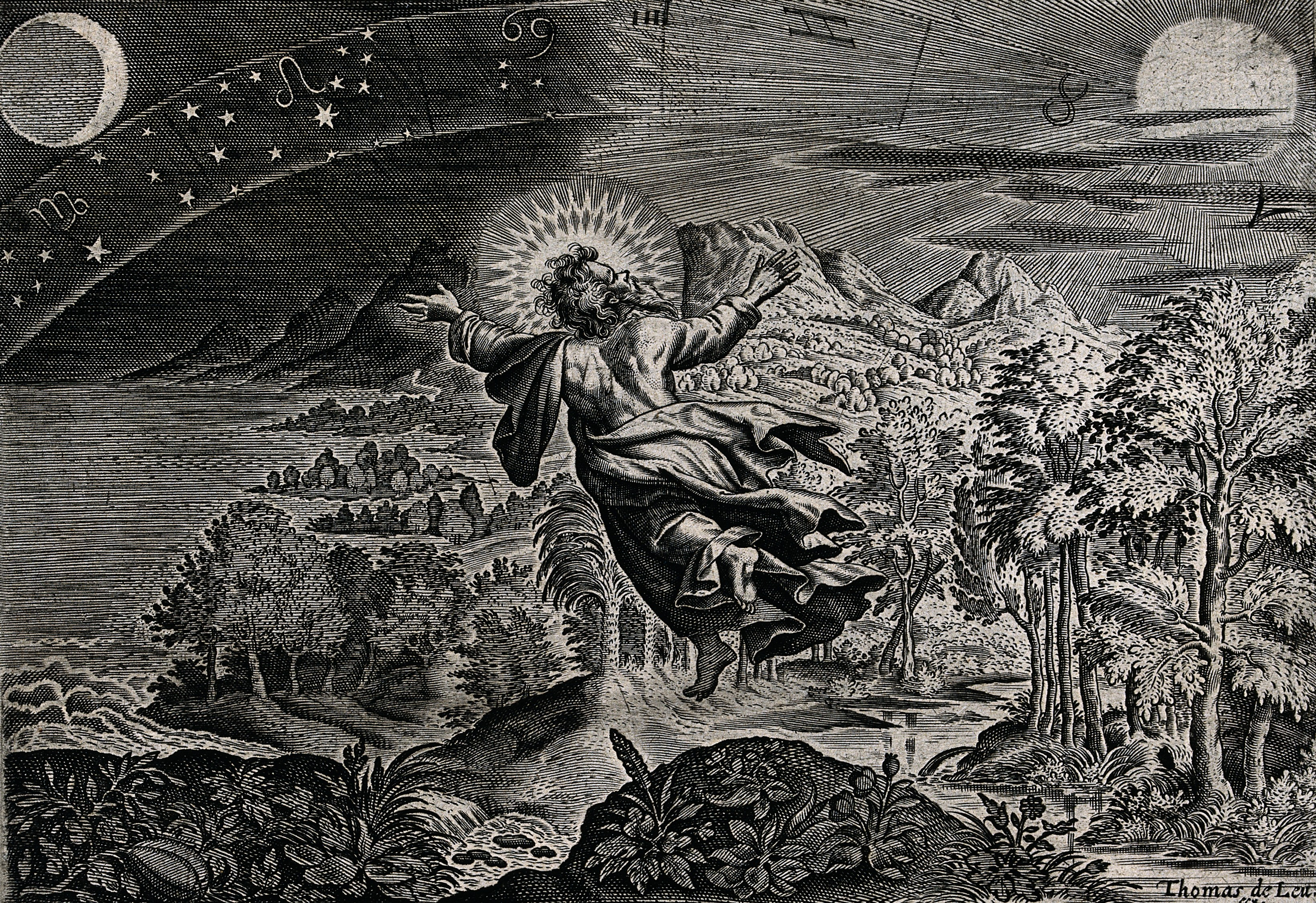
God creates the sun, moon, and stars

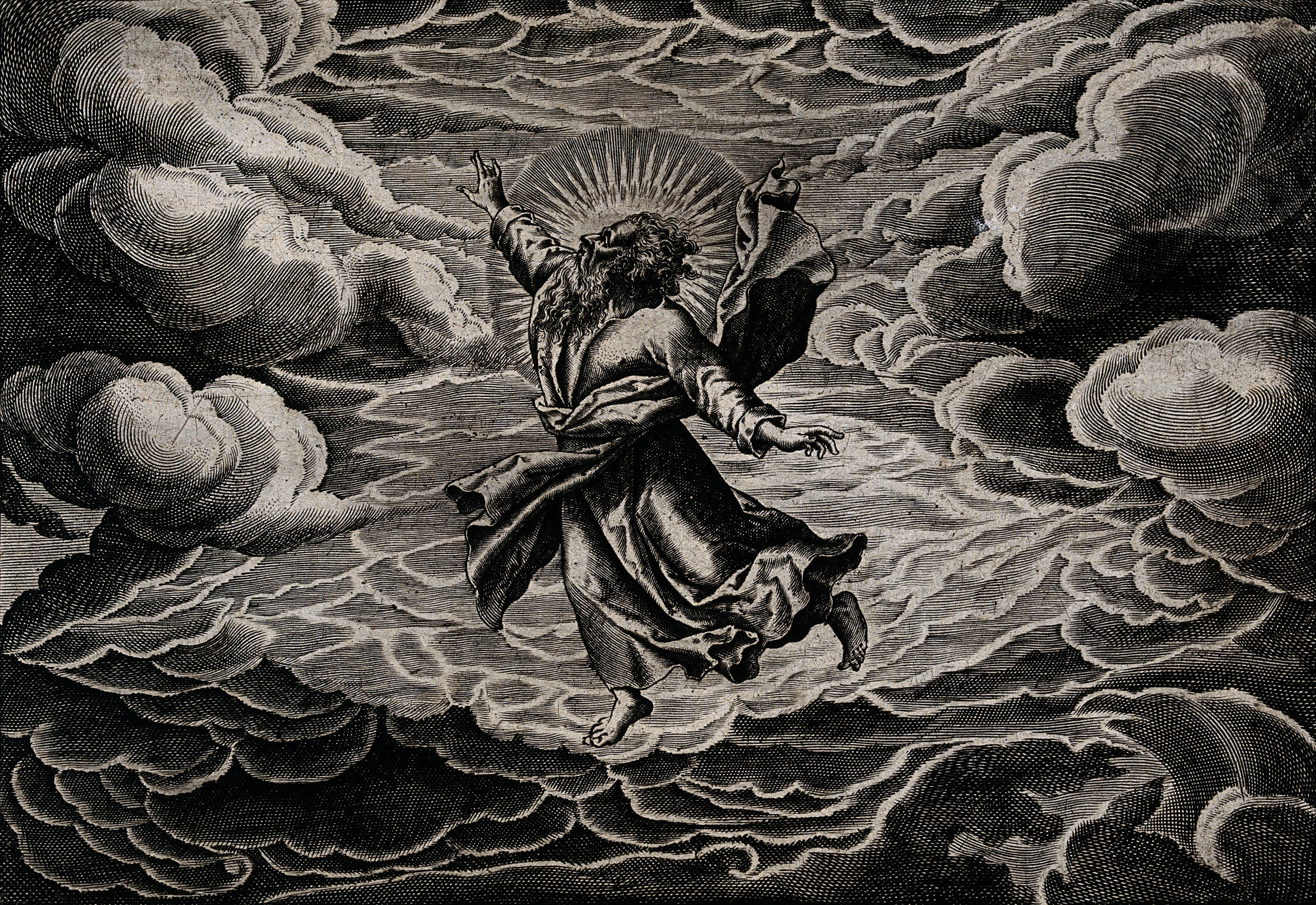
God, suspended in the clouds, creates light

== Bibliography ==
- Bassani, Paola Pacht (1996). "Vignon, Claude" in Turner 1996, vol. 32, pp. 509–510.
- Benezit (2006). "Leu, Thomas de", vol. 8, p. 915, in Benezit Dictionary of Artists. Paris: Gründ. ISBN 9782700030709.
- Grivel, Marianne (1986). Le Commerce de l'estampe à Paris au XVIIe siècle. Geneva: Droze. Listings at WorldCat.
- Grivel, Marianne (1996a). "Gaultier, Léonard" in Turner 1996, vol. 12, pp. 203–204.
- Grivel, Marianne (1996b). "Leu, Thomas de" in Turner 1996, vol. 19, p. 257.
- Linzeler, André; Aldhémar, Jean (1932–1938). Inventaire du fonds français: graveurs du seizième siècle. Paris: Maurice Le Garrec. Paris: Bibliothèque nationale. Listings at WorldCat.
- Préaud, Maxime; Pierre Casselle; Marianne Grivel; Corinne Le Bitouze (1987). Dictionnaire des éditeurs d'estampes à Paris sous l'Ancien Régime. Promodis. ISBN 2903181608.
- Turner, Jane, editor (1996). The Dictionary of Art, reprinted with minor corrections in 1998. New York: Grove. ISBN 9781884446009.
