= Sikiratou Aguêmon =

Beninese politician and lawyer (born 1948)

Sikiratou Kissira Aguêmon (born 8 March 1948) is a Beninese politician and lawyer. She was Minister of Commerce and Minister of Trade and Tourism in the last government of Nicéphore Soglo.

== Career ==
Aguêmon served as Minister of Commerce (1995) and Minister of Trade and Tourism (1995–1996) in the last government of Nicéphore Soglo. She is also a lawyer.
