= Dieudonné Kalulika =

Congolese footballer

Personal information
- Full name: Dieudonné Kalulika
- Date of birth: October 1, 1981 (age 45)
- Place of birth: Kinshasa, Zaire
- Height: 1.69 m (5 ft 7 in)
- Position: Midfielder

Senior career*
| Years | Team | Apps | (Gls) |
| 2003–2005 | TP Mazembe | | |
| 2005 | Heusden-Zolder | 21 | (6) |
| 2006 | K.V.S.K. United | | |
| 2006–2007 | FC Brussels | 26 | (4) |
| 2007 | K. Sint-Truidense V.V. | 7 | (0) |
| 2008 | K.S.V. Roeselare | 5 | (0) |
| 2008–2009 | C.S. Visé | | |
| 2012–2014 | Primeiro de Agosto | | |

International career^{‡}
| 2004–2006 | DR Congo | 12 | (4) |
- * Club domestic league appearances and goals as of July 2008 ‡ National team caps and goals as of December 2009

Dieudonné Kalulika (born October 1, 1981) is a Congolese former football player who last played for C.S. Visé.

== International career ==
He was part of the Congolese 2004 African Nations Cup team that finished bottom of their group in the first round of competition, thus failing to qualify for the quarter-finals.
