= Léandre Bizagwira =

Rwandan footballer (born 1977)

Personal information
- Date of birth: 15 May 1977 (age 49)

International career
Years	Team	Apps	(Gls)
2000–2004	Rwanda	14	(0)

Léandre Bizagwira (born 15 May 1977) is a former Rwandan footballer. He played in 14 matches for the Rwanda national football team from 2000 to 2004. He was also named in Rwanda's squad for the 2004 African Cup of Nations tournament.
