= George Japhet Waweru =

Kenyan footballer (born 1978)

Personal information
- Date of birth: 12 October 1978 (age 48)

International career
Years	Team	Apps	(Gls)
1999–2007	Kenya	41	(0)

George Japhet Waweru (born 12 October 1978) is a Kenyan footballer. He played in 41 matches for the Kenya national football team from 1999 to 2007. He was also named in Kenya's squad for the 2004 African Cup of Nations tournament.
