= Toussaint Natama =

Burkinabé footballer (1982–2024)

Personal information
- Date of birth: 31 October 1982
- Place of birth: Republic of Upper Volta
- Date of death: 18 August 2024 (aged 41)
- Height: 1.82 m (6 ft 0 in)
- Position: Forward

Senior career*
Years	Team	Apps	(Gls)
1998–2000	ÉF Ouagadougou		
2000–2001	Al Ittihad Alexandria Club		
2001–2004	Westerlo	20	(1)

International career
2001–2004	Burkina Faso	3	(0)
- * Club domestic league appearances and goals

Toussaint Natama (31 October 1982 – 18 August 2024) was a Burkinabé professional footballer who played as a forward for ÉF Ouagadougou, Al Ittihad Alexandria Club and Westerlo. At international level, he made three appearances for the Burkina Faso national team.

== Career ==
Born in the Republic of Upper Volta, Natama began playing football with local side ÉF Ouagadougou. He joined Egyptian Premier League side Al Ittihad Alexandria Club before moving to Belgium in 2001, where he signed a contract with Belgian Pro League side Westerlo.

Natama was selected to play for the Burkina Faso national team which would compete in the 2004 African Nations Cup finals in Tunisia, but was injured in a pre-tournament friendly against Guinea in Marseille, France. The injury left him in a coma for two weeks and with left-side paralysis that ended his football playing career.

== Death ==
Natama died on 18 August 2024, at the age of 41.
