= Noëlle Amouzoun =

Beninese footballer (born 1998)

Personal information
- Date of birth: 2 December 1998 (age 27)
- Place of birth: Bembèrèkè, Benin
- Positions: Defender; midfielder

Team information
- Current team: ES16

Senior career*
Years	Team	Apps	(Gls)
- Angers
- ES16

International career
- Benin
- * Club domestic league appearances and goals

Noëlle Amouzoun (born 2 December 1998) is a Beninese footballer who plays as a defender for French club ES16 and the Benin women's national team.

== Early life ==
Amouzoun is a native of Azovè, Benin.

== Career ==
In 2020, Amouzoun signed for French side Angers, becoming the first female Beninese player to play in Europe.

== Style of play ==
Amouzoun mainly operates as a midfielder and has been described as "like a certain Casemiro. His presence in front of the defense comforts and gives confidence to his partners. Noëlle is a defensive midfielder, but she has incredible dribbling skills. These ball controls and his dribbling reveal a high level. With the ball stuck to her foot, she dribbles past her opponents without any difficulty".

== Personal life ==
Amouzoun has worked as a youth manager.
