= Moses Gikenyi =

Kenyan footballer (born 1972)

Personal information
- Date of birth: 19 November 1972 (age 53)
- Position: Defender

Senior career*
Years	Team	Apps	(Gls)
- St Michel United

International career
2004	Kenya	2	(0)
- * Club domestic league appearances and goals

Moses Gikenyi (born 19 November 1972) is a Kenyan former footballer. He played in two matches for the Kenya national football team in 2004. He was also named in Kenya's squad for the 2004 African Cup of Nations tournament.

At the club level he played for St Michel United in Seychelles.
