= Walter Odede =

Kenyan footballer (born 1974)

Personal information
- Date of birth: 11 November 1974 (age 51)

Senior career*
Years	Team	Apps	(Gls)
- Mathare United
- Bandari

International career
2002–2003	Kenya	16	(0)
- * Club domestic league appearances and goals

Walter Odede (born 11 November 1974) is a Kenyan footballer. He played in 16 matches for the Kenya national football team in 2002 and 2003. He was also named in Kenya's squad for the 2004 African Cup of Nations tournament.
