= Samuel Emmanuel Suka =

Beninese footballer

Samuel Emmanuel Suka (born 10 September 1983) is a retired Beninese football player who last played for Liberty Professionals.

== International career ==
He was part of the Beninese 2004 African Nations Cup team, who finished bottom of their group in the first round of competition, thus failing to secure qualification for the quarter-finals.
