= Rodrigue Akpakoun =

Beninese footballer

Personal information
- Full name: Rodrigue Akpakoun
- Date of birth: 16 December 1974 (age 51)
- Place of birth: Cotonou, Benin
- Height: 1.77 m (5 ft 10 in)
- Position: Striker

Senior career*
Years	Team	Apps	(Gls)
1997–1998	Beaucaire	22	(6)
1998–1999	Sète	28	(9)
1999–2001	Alès	64	(20)
2001–2002	Reims	25	(3)
2002–2003	La Roche-sur-Yon	22	(4)
2004–2006	Martigues	27	(5)
Total		188	(47)

International career
2002–2004	Benin	5	(2)
- * Club domestic league appearances and goals

Rodrigue Akpakoun (born 16 December 1974) is a Beninese former professional footballer who played as a striker.

== Career ==
Akpakoun played several seasons in the lower tiers of French football, including spells at Stade de Reims and La Roche VF.

Akpakoun was part of the Beninese 2004 African Nations Cup team which finished bottom of its group in the first round of competition, thus failing to secure qualification for the quarter-finals.
