= Moustapha Agnidé =

Beninese footballer

Personal information
- Date of birth: 31 December 1981 (age 44)
- Place of birth: Ifangni, Benin
- Height: 1.80 m (5 ft 11 in)
- Position: Midfielder

Senior career*
Years	Team	Apps	(Gls)
1997–2000	Dragons de l'Ouémé		
2000–2001	Mogas 90 FC		
2001–2004	Lorient		
2004–2005	Vannes	12	(1)
2005–2008	AS Vitré	81	(6)
2008–2009	Quimper	14	(0)
2009–2010	GSI Pontivy		
2010–2014	Saint-Colomban Locminé		
2014–2015	US Montagnarde		
- * Club domestic league appearances and goals

Idrissou Moustapha Agnidé (born 31 December 1981) is a Beninese former professional footballer who played as a midfielder.

Agnidé played several seasons for AS Vitré in the Championnat de France amateur.

He played for the Benin national team at the 2004 African Cup of Nations.
