= Canesius Bizimana =

Rwandan footballer

Personal information
- Date of birth: 15 January 1984 (age 42)

Senior career*
Years	Team	Apps	(Gls)
- Mukura Victory

International career
2003–2004	Rwanda	3	(0)
- * Club domestic league appearances and goals

Canesius Bizimana (born 15 January 1984) is a Rwandan footballer. He played in three matches for the Rwanda national football team in 2003 and 2004. He was also named in Rwanda's squad for the 2004 African Cup of Nations tournament.
