= Karelle Vignon Vullierme =

Beninese food blogger

Karelle Vignon-Vullierme
- Born: 21 March 1987 (age 38); Paris, France
- Education: Moncton University in New Brunswick
- Occupation: CO-CEO of Les Gourmandises de Karelle
- Website: http://lesgourmandisesdekarelle.com

Karelle Vignon-Vullierme (born 21 March 1987) is a food blogger living in Dakar, the capital of Senegal since 2012. Of Beninese origin, she spent her childhood and adolescence in Paris, France. She has won a number of awards, including Best African Blogger and the Orange prize for women's digital entrepreneurship.

== Background ==
Vignon-Vullierme parents are both from Benin, her father is a journalist, and her mother is an accountant in Seine-et-Marne. Vignon-Vullierme graduated high school at Lycée Louis-Armand in France and then decided to pursue her information and communication studies at Moncton University in New Brunswick, Canada, where she graduated in Information Communication (ICOM) and met her future husband and business partner Olivier Vullierme. Vignon Vullierme then obtained a certificate in immigration and interethnic relations at the Québec University in Montréal. During this time, she was a daily columnist for a Montreal radio and weekly host of an African web-radio, broadcasting from Montreal. In 2012 after 6 years in Canada, she decided to go back to Senegal, where her husband's mom is from.

== Career ==
In Dakar, Vignon-Vullierme worked for a digital company and radio. Vignon-Vullierme worked in journalism and lived by her profession but she decided to go on another path and follow her passion for cooking. Vignon-Vullierme is not a chef because she has not received professional training but is an autodidact of home cooking, easy, fast, healthy and balanced. Vignon-Vullierme is now the CO-CEO of the blog Les Gourmandises de Karelle which is a virtual collection of homemade cooking recipes, founded in December 2013. Her blog is now also available on IOS and Android. Vignon-Vullierme publishes a recipe every Monday on her website which attracts 150,000 visitors every month. She has now 67 000 followers on Facebook and 44 600 on Instagram. The main goal of the blog Les Gourmandises De Karelle is to become one of the first French speaking blogs in the field of cooking in Africa. Since February 2017, Les Gourmandises de Karelle has entered into a collaboration with the Orange Network as part of a daily sending of tips and recipes by text messages in Senegal and in Mali. Les Gourmandises de Karelle are also mandated by various companies for the creation of food contents in text, photos and videos.

Karelle took part, in November 2019, in the shooting of the Netflix documentary "High on the hog". She presented Beninese cuisine from before slavery as well as today's Beninese cuisine.

In 2021, Karelle Vignon-Vullierme launched her first TV show named "Les gourmandises de Karelle" on the channel Cuisine. The TV show is broadcast throughout all French-speaking Africa.

== Awards ==
Vignon-Vullierme won the Linguère Digital Challenge in December 2016 and was voted blogger of the year in Senegal in 2016. She also won the Orange prize for women's digital entrepreneurship. In March 2017, Vignon-Vullierme was elected by a jury of professionals "African Food Influencer in French speaking countries" at Adicomdays. In 2018, she was elected Best African Blogger out of eight selected countries and she was one of 54 women entrepreneurs selected by the platform Women in Africa for the second forum held in late September in Marrakech, Morocco.
