= Philip Opiyo =

Kenyan footballer (born 1979)

Personal information
- Full name: Philip Opiyo Wire
- Date of birth: 27 February 1979 (age 47)
- Place of birth: Kenya
- Position: Defender

Senior career*
Years	Team	Apps	(Gls)
1999–2003	Mathare United		
2003	Tusker		
2003–2004	Free State Stars		
2004–2005	Umtata Bush Bucks		
2007–2008	Sofapaka		
2008–2011	Bandari		

International career
2001–2004	Kenya		
- * Club domestic league appearances and goals

Philip Opiyo (born 27 February 1979) is a former footballer who played professionally in South Africa and represented the Kenya national football team.

== Career ==
Opiyo made his Kenyan Premier League debut playing as a central defender for Mathare United in 1999. He played for Mathare United until 2003, finishing runner-up in the league's player of the year voting in 2001.

After a brief spell with Tusker in 2003, Opiyo moved to South Africa to sign with Premier Soccer League side Free State Stars. The following season he joined Umtata Bush Bucks, but he was suspended by the league following a failed drugs test in February 2005.

Opiyo returned to Kenya where he begin playing club football again with Sofapaka in 2007. A year later, he joined Bandari, where he would play until retiring.

Opiyo has made several appearances for Kenya, playing in the 2004 African Cup of Nations finals and four 2006 FIFA World Cup qualifying matches.
