= Zimbabwean names =

Zimbabwean names consist of a first or given name followed by a family name or surname, for example Panashe Mutsipa. The given names are influenced by the culture of the people, religious and Church involvement, and personal tastes. The first names may be in any of the vernacular languages of that country, English names or derived from English words.

== Naming customs ==
It is a common custom among the Shona and Ndebele people to give baby names that celebrate virtue such as: Nokutenda (with gratitude); Tatenda (we are grateful); Ruramai (be righteous).

There are also names that praise and worship God, such as: Kudakwashe (the Lord's will); Ruvarashe (the Lord's flower); Nokutenda (associated with faith); Vimbainashe (have faith in the Lord).

Traditionally names were also given that expressa parent or family feelings or the circumstances of the family or baby at the time of birth. For example, a family that was recently bereaved may name a new baby Munyaradzi, which means comforter, or Tanyaradzwa, which means we have been comforted, or Nunurai (rescue or save us); Tendai (be grateful); Tamayi (move from here), or Taurayi (speak out, speak up).

Examples of unisex names in Zimbabwe include Anashe, Panashe, Tamiranashe, Kunashe, and Tanyaradzwa.

== Who gives names ==
Names are typically given by the parents of the child when it is born. However names may also be given by grandparents and other relatives with the parents' consent. Traditionally when a person that is not a parent names a child, that person would pay a token sum of money or gift that allowed them to give a name to a child which is not their own.
