= Bekithemba Ndlovu =

Zimbabwean footballer (born 1976)

Personal information
- Date of birth: 9 August 1976 (age 50)
- Place of birth: Bulawayo, Rhodesia
- Height: 1.82 m (6 ft 0 in)
- Position: Defender

Team information
- Current team: Green Fuel (head coach)

Senior career*
Years	Team	Apps	(Gls)
–2004	Highlanders		
2004–2005	Moroka Swallows		
2005–2008	Silver Stars / Platinum Stars		
2009	Bantu Rovers		
2010	Gunners		
2011	Highlanders		

International career
2000–2006	Zimbabwe	21	(1)

Managerial career
- 2023-: Green Fuel
- * Club domestic league appearances and goals

Bekithemba Ndlovu (born 9 August 1976) is a retired Zimbabwean football defender. A Zimbabwe international, he played at the 2000, 2003 and 2004 COSAFA Cup and the 2004 African Cup of Nations.
