= Dinalo Adigo =

Beninese footballer

Personal information
- Full name: Cristiano Dinalo Adigo
- Date of birth: 25 July 1972 (age 54)
- Place of birth: Cotonou, Benin
- Height: 1.76 m (5 ft 9 in)
- Positions: Defender; midfielder

Team information
- Current team: Phönix Lübeck (Manager)

Youth career
- 1980–1982: Caïman du Zou
- 1983–1991: Mogas 90 FC

Senior career*
Years	Team	Apps	(Gls)
1991–1992	Mogas 90 FC		
1992–1993	Westerlo	0	(0)
1993–1995	Kickers Offenbach	59	(3)
1995–1997	Lok Altmark Stendal	55	(6)
1997–1999	SSV Reutlingen 05	27	(2)
1999–2007	FC Schönberg 95		

International career
2004–2006	Benin	17	(0)

Managerial career
- 2007–2010: FC Schönberg 95
- 2013–2019: FC Anker Wismar
- 2021–2023: Rostocker FC
- 2023–: Phönix Lübeck
- * Club domestic league appearances and goals

Cristiano Dinalo Adigo (born 25 July 1972) is a Beninese football coach and former player who coaches Phönix Lübeck.

== Playing career ==
Adigo was born in Cotonou. He played for Kickers Offenbach, including a DFB Pokal first round match against Hertha BSC in 1994.

He was part of the Benin national team at the 2004 African Nations Cup, which finished bottom of its group in the first round of competition, thus failing to secure qualification for the quarter-finals.

== Coaching career ==
After his retirement, on 1 July 2007, Adigo took the job as head coach of FC Schönberg 95 and was in his first season rice-champion of the Verbandsliga Mecklenburg-Vorpommern.

== Personal life ==
Adigo is the father of the Benin international footballer Ryan Adigo.
