= Maxime Agueh =

Footballer (born 1978)

Personal information
- Date of birth: 1 April 1978 (age 48)
- Place of birth: Lille, France
- Height: 1.90 m (6 ft 3 in)
- Position: Goalkeeper

Senior career*
Years	Team	Apps	(Gls)
1997–1999	Lille B	5	(0)
1998–1999	Luton Town	14	(0)
1999–2001	FC Denderleeuw EH	37	(0)
2001–2002	Saint-Marcellin	35	(0)
2002–2005	ASOA Valence	80	(0)
2005–2006	Acharnaikos	8	(0)
2006–2007	RFC Tournai	11	(0)
2007–2009	Gueugnon	12	(0)
2009–2010	Dunkerque	4	(0)
Total		206	(0)

International career
2005	Benin	9	(0)
- * Club domestic league appearances and goals

Maxime Agueh (born 1 April 1978) is a former professional footballer who played as a goalkeeper. Born in France, he played for the Benin national team internationally.

== Club career ==
Born in Lille, Agueh began his career with Lille OSC. On 1 July 1998, he signed for Luton Town F.C. where he played one year. In July 1999 he moved to Jupiler League club FC Denderleeuw EH where he stayed for two years

In summer 2001 Agueh returned to France, signing with Saint-Marcellin. He played one season here and signed with Championnat National club ASOA Valence. After three years with Valence, he signed 2005 for Acharnaikos F.C. In Greece played eight games in the Gamma Ethniki and signed in July 2006 with RFC Tournai for his second time in Belgium and played eleven games in the Jupiler League in the 2006–07 season. On 1 July 2007, after the end of the season, he signed with Ligue 2 club FC Gueugnon.

== International career ==
Agueh was part of the Benin national team's 2004 African Nations Cup team, which finished bottom of its group in the first round of competition, thus failing to qualify for the next round. He played his first game in 2003 against Nigeria.

== Personal life ==
His father Gabriel Kuessivi Agueh is Minister of Finance in Benin.
