= Sylvain Remy =

Beninese footballer

Sylvain Remy (born 15 November 1980) is a former Beninese football player, who last played for Clermont.

== International career ==
He was part of the Beninese 2004 African Nations Cup team, who finished bottom of their group in the first round of competition, thus failing to secure qualification for the quarter-finals.
