= Michel Kamanzi =

Rwandan footballer

Personal information
- Date of birth: 29 September 1979 (age 47)
- Place of birth: Bujumbura, Burundi
- Height: 1.80 m (5 ft 11 in)
- Position: Midfielder

Senior career*
Years	Team	Apps	(Gls)
- Rayon Sports
- SG Betzdorf
2004-2006	TuRU Düsseldorf	31	(2)
- TuSpo Richrath

International career
2000-2004	Rwanda	8	(1)
- * Club domestic league appearances and goals

Michel Kamanzi (born 29 September 1979) is a Rwandan former footballer who is last known to have played as a midfielder for TuSpo Richrath.

== Career ==
Kamanzi moved to Germany on the recommendation of a compatriot.

In 2004, Kamanzi signed for German fourth division side after playing for SG Betzdorf in the German fifth division.
