= Mumias Sugar F.C. =

Mumias Sugar FC
- Full name: Mumias Sugar Football Club
- Nickname: Musco
- Founded: 1977; 49 years ago
- Dissolved: 2007; 19 years ago
- Ground: Mumias Sports Complex; Mumias, Kenya
- Capacity: 10,000
- League: Kenyan Premier League
- 2006–07: Withdrew
Home colours

Mumias Sugar was a Kenyan football club formed in 1977 and based in Mumias. The home stadium was Mumias Sports Complex. It was a member of the top division in Kenyan football, but the club was disbanded midway of the 2007 season.

The club won the Kenyan President's Cup in 1996 and 1999, though the latter was revoked due to a match fixing-scandal.

The club was owned by the Mumias Sugar Company.

== Achievements ==
- Kenyan President's Cup: 2

1996, 1999

The club also won the Kenya Premier League 1999 but was handed to Tusker after they celebrated with their opponents on the last day allegedly claiming it was matchfixing.

== Legends ==
Charles Kimuyu, Evans Alemba, Mark Sirengo, Eric Lumiti, Bernard Onyango, Andrew Kortok, Patrick Mugata, Nick Yakhama, Steve 'Kush'Okumu, Abiud Ayuku, Ahmed Yusuf, Silvanus Otema, Ken Agwagi, Issah Kassim, Atnus Amache, Antony Shikubu, Shabaan salim, Abedi Mjumbe, Fidelis Odeke, Paul Murunga, Mukoshi, Harry Yakhama, Jackton Aimbo, Francis Chinjili, Tom Ochura, Evans Alusa, Mohammed Seif, Moses Okoth, Ken Angwa, Allan Wamunyinyi, Evans Alusa, Barnabas Lumbasi, Gilbert Okoth, Charles Namudeche, Edwin Mukabi, Alex Wafula, Philo, Ken Mukoya, Philo, Shikuku"Shughuli", David Akoi, Kijeshi, Gogo,

== Performance in Confederation of African Football competitions ==
- CAF Cup Winners' Cup: 1 appearance

1997 – First Round

- CAF Cup: 1 appearance

1999 – First Round
