= List of companies of Benin =

Location of Benin

Benin is a country in West Africa. It is bordered by Togo to the west, Nigeria to the east, and Burkina Faso and Niger to the north. A majority of the population live on its small southern coastline on the Bight of Benin, part of the Gulf of Guinea in the northernmost tropical portion of the Atlantic Ocean. The capital of Benin is Porto-Novo, but the seat of government is in Cotonou, the country's largest city and economic capital. Benin covers an area of 114,763 square kilometers and its population in 2015 was estimated to be approximately 10.88 million. Benin is a tropical, sub-Saharan nation, highly dependent on agriculture, with substantial employment and income arising from subsistence farming.

== Notable firms ==
This list includes notable companies with primary headquarters located in the country. The industry and sector follow the Industry Classification Benchmark taxonomy. Organizations which have ceased operations are included and noted as defunct.

Notable companies Status: P=Private, S=State; A=Active, D=Defunct
Name	Industry	Sector	Headquarters	Founded	Notes	Status	
Afrique Airlines	Consumer services	Airlines	Cotonou	2002	Airline, defunct 2006	P	D
Banque Internationale du Bénin	Financials	Banks	Cotonou	1990	National bank	P	A
Benin Golf Air	Consumer services	Airlines	Cotonou	2002	Airline, defunct 2012	P	D
Communauté Électrique du Bénin	Utilities	Conventional electricity	Cotonou	1968	Electricity	P	A
Compagnie Béninoise de Négoce et de Distribution (CBND)	Consumer services	Broadline retailers	Cotonou	1973	Trading and retail	P	A
COTAIR	Consumer services	Airlines	Cotonou	2008	Airline, defunct 2009	P	D
Financial Bank Benin	Financials	Banks	Cotonou	1996	Bank	P	A
La Poste du Bénin	Industrials	Delivery services	Cotonou	2004	Postal services	S	A
Royal Air	Consumer services	Airlines	Cotonou	2009	Charter airline, defunct 2012	P	D
Société Nationale de Commercialisation des Produits Pétroliers	Oil & gas	Exploration & production	Cotonou	1974	Petroleum	P	A
Trans Air Benin	Consumer services	Airlines	Cotonou	2000	Airline	P	A
Zircon Airways Benin	Consumer services	Airlines	Cotonou	2001	Airline, defunct 2002	P	D

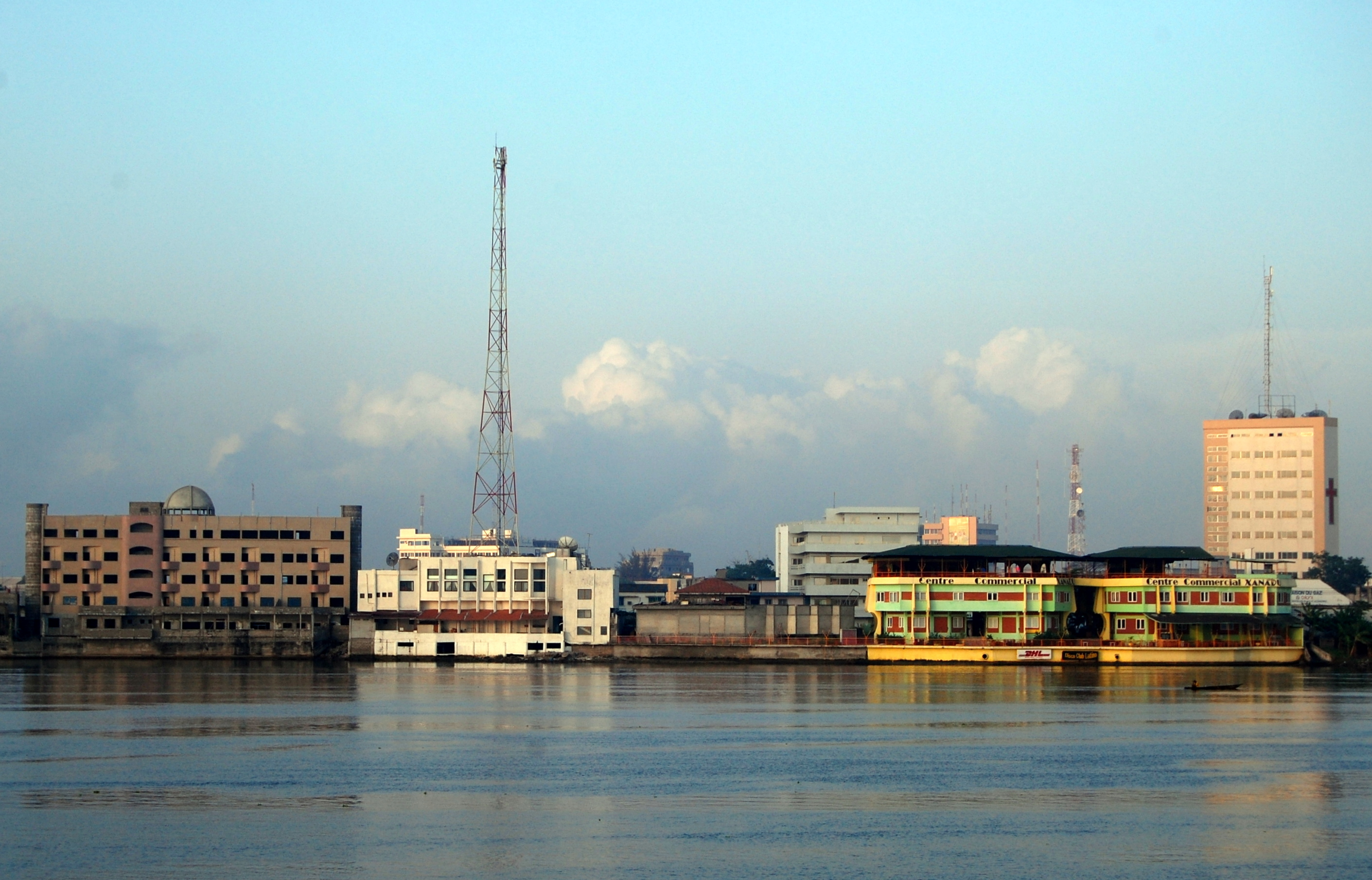
Cotonou is the largest city and economic capital of Benin.

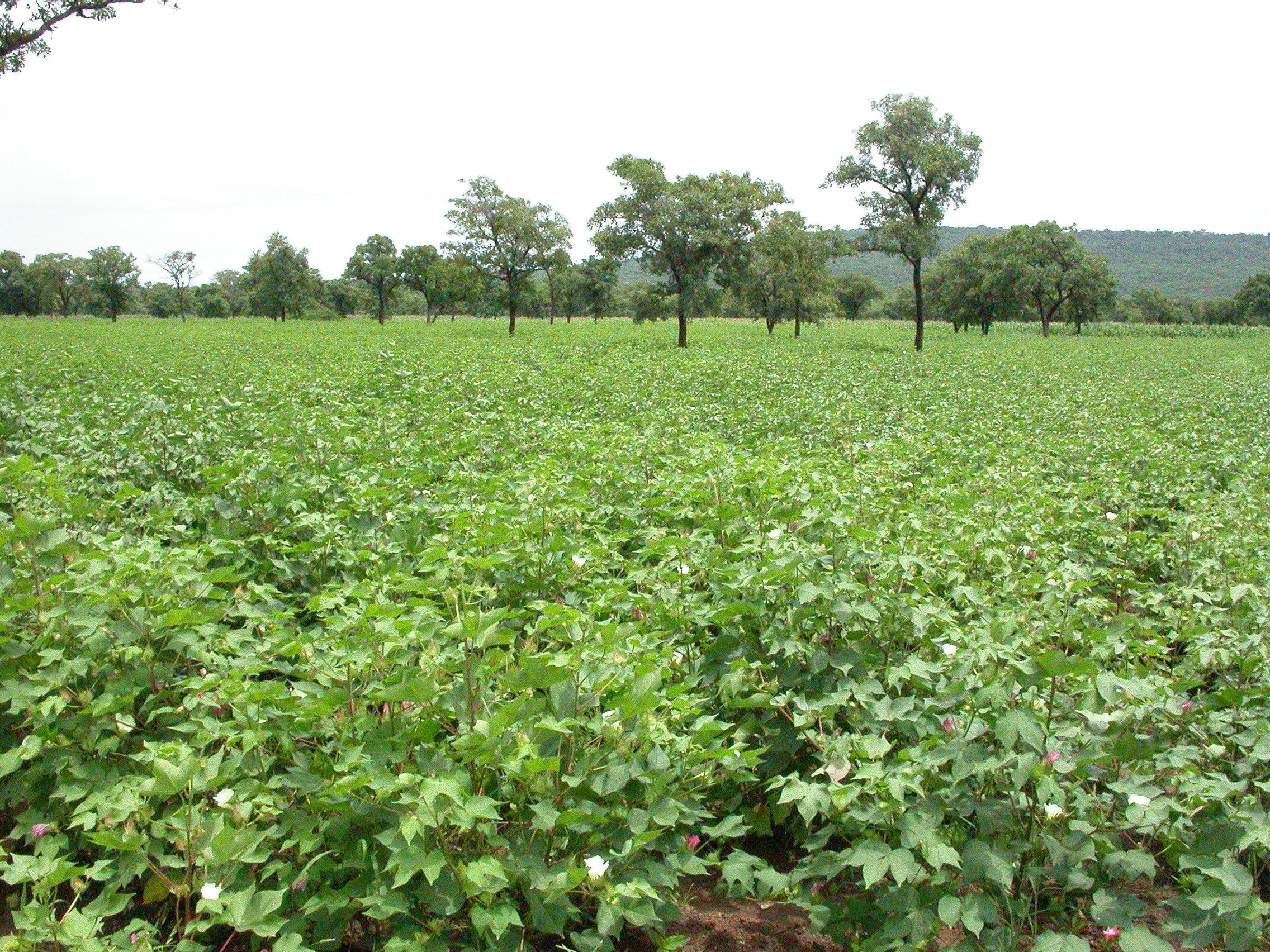
Cotton field in northern Benin

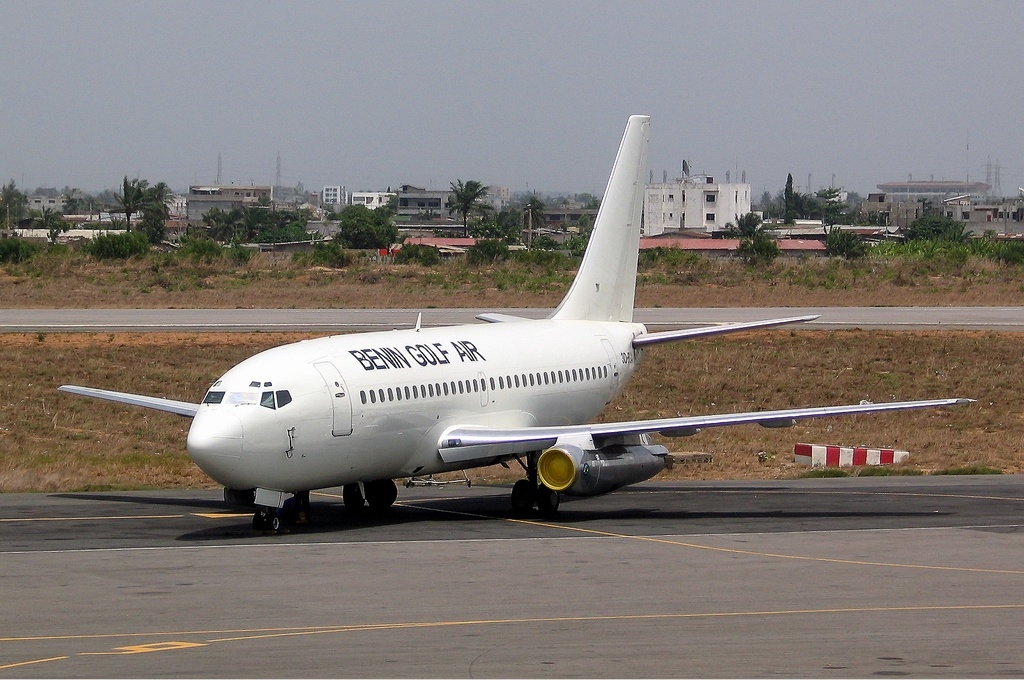
Benin Golf Air Boeing 737-200

== See also ==
- List of airlines of Benin
- List of banks in Benin
