= Economy of Benin =

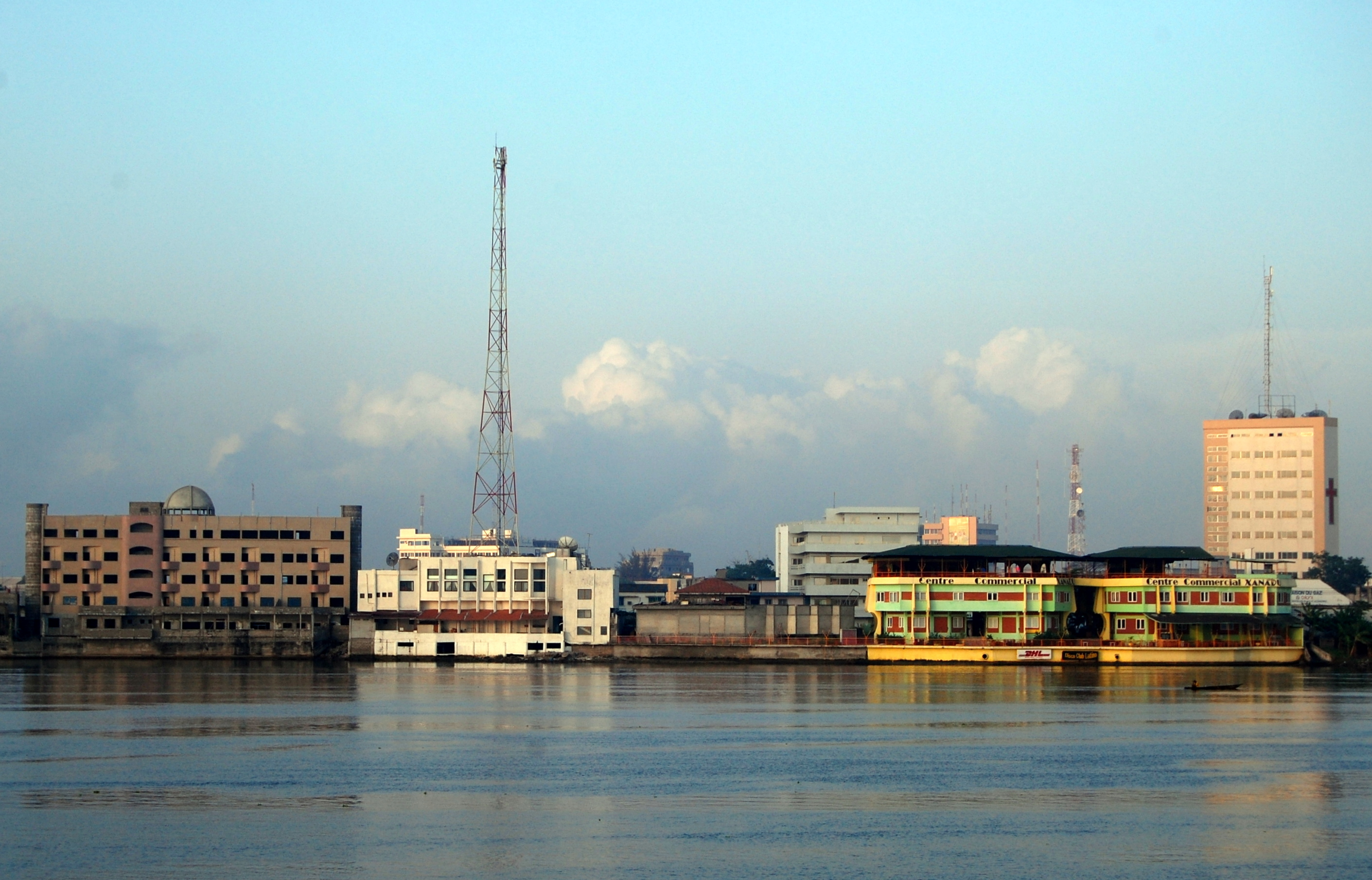
- Cotonou is the largest city and economic capital of Benin
- Currency: West African CFA franc (XOF, CFA)
- Fiscal year: Calendar year
- Trade organisations: AU, AfCFTA (signed), ECOWAS, CEN-SAD, WTO
- Country group: Least Developed; Lower-middle income economy

Statistics
- Population: ▲11,485,048 (2018)
- GDP: ▲$23.07 billion (nominal, 2025f); ▲$68.910 billion (PPP, 2025f)
- GDP rank: 124th (nominal, 2019); 115th (PPP, 2019)
- GDP growth: ▲6.7% (2020f)
- GDP per capita: ▲$1,590 (nominal, 2025 est.); ▲$4,740 (PPP, 2025 est.)
- GDP per capita rank: 157th (nominal, 2019); 153rd (PPP, 2019)
- GDP by sector: agriculture: 26.1%; industry: 22.8%; services: 51.1%; (2017 est.)
- Inflation (CPI): 1.0% (2020 est.)
- Population below national poverty line: 36.2% (2011 est.); 49.5% on less than $1.90/day (2015)
- Gini coefficient: 34,4 high (2021)
- Human Development Index: ▲0.520 low (2018) (163rd); 0.327 IHDI (2018)
- Labour force: ▲4,862,455 (2019); ▼70.0% employment rate (2011)
- Unemployment: 1% (2014 est.)
- Main industries: textiles, food processing, construction materials, cement

External
- Exports: $1.974 billion (2017 est.)
- Export goods: Cotton, cashews, shea butter, textiles, palm products, seafood
- Main export partners: Bangladesh 26.9%; India 14.2%; Vietnam 10.4%; China 7.4%; Nigeria 5.7%; Denmark 3.6%; Egypt 3.4%; Niger 3.1%; (2019)
- Imports: $2.787 billion (2017 est.)
- Import goods: Foodstuffs, capital goods, petroleum products
- Main import partners: India 13.7%; China 11.1%; Togo 10.9%; France 8.8%; Thailand 5.4%; Belgium 3.8%; UAE 3.4%; Morocco 2.9%; (2019)
- Current account: ▼ −$1.024 billion (2017 est.)
- Gross external debt: ▲$2.804 billion (31 December 2017 est.)

Public finance
- Government debt: ▲54.6% of GDP (2017 est.)
- Foreign reserves: ▲$698.9 million (31 December 2017 est.)
- Budget balance: −6.2% (of GDP) (2017 est.)
- Revenue: 1.578 billion (2017 est.)
- Spending: 2.152 billion (2017 est.)
- Credit rating: Standard & Poor's: B (Domestic); B (Foreign); BBB- (T&C Assessment)
- All values, unless otherwise stated, are in US dollars.

Benin has a developing economy dependent on subsistence agriculture and cotton. Cotton accounts for 40% of its GDP and roughly 80% of official export receipts. There is also production of textiles, palm products, and cocoa beans. Maize (corn), beans, rice, peanuts, cashews, pineapples, cassava, yams, and other various tubers are grown for local subsistence. Benin began producing a modest quantity of offshore oil in October 1982. Production ceased in recent years but exploration of new sites is ongoing.

A modest fishing fleet provides fish and shrimp for local subsistence and export to Europe. Formerly government-owned commercial activities are now privatized. A French brewer acquired the former state-run brewery. Smaller businesses are privately owned by Beninese citizens, but some firms are foreign owned, primarily French and Lebanese. The private commercial and agricultural sectors remain the principal contributors to growth.

== Economic development ==
Since the transition to a democratic government in 1990, Benin has undergone an economic recovery. A large injection of external investment from both private and public sources has alleviated the economic difficulties of the early 1990s caused by global recession and persistently low commodity prices (although the latter continues to affect the economy). The manufacturing sector is confined to some light industry, which is mainly involved in processing primary products and the cow production of consumer goods. A planned joint hydroelectric project with neighboring Togo is intended to reduce Benin's dependence on imported energy mostly from Ghana, which currently accounts for a significant proportion of the country's imports.

The service sector has grown quickly, stimulated by economic liberalization and fiscal reform, and the use of modern technology such as automobiles and computers has grown considerably as a result. Membership of the CFA Franc Zone offers reasonable currency stability as well as access to French economic support. Benin sells its products mainly to France and, in smaller quantities, to the Netherlands, Korea, Japan, and India. France is Benin's leading source for imports. Benin is also a member of the Economic Community of West African States (ECOWAS).

Despite its rapid growth, the economy of Benin still remains underdeveloped and dependent on subsistence agriculture, cotton production, and regional trade. Growth in real output averaged a sound 5% since 1996, but a rapid population rise offset much of this growth on a per capita basis. Inflation has subsided over the past several years. Commercial and transport activities, which make up a large part of GDP, are vulnerable to developments in Nigeria, particularly fuel shortages.

Although trade unions in Benin represent up to 75% of the formal workforce, the large informal economy has been noted by the International Trade Union Confederation (ITCU) to contain ongoing problems, including a lack of women's wage equality, the use of child labour, and the continuing issue of forced labour.

In December 2014, the Bureau of International Labor Affairs issued a List of Goods Produced by Child Labor or Forced Labor in which the Republic of Benin was mentioned among 74 other countries where significant instances of child labor were observed. Two major products involved such working conditions in Benin: cotton and crushed granite.

== Sectors ==
=== Agriculture ===
Benin produced in 2018:

- 3.8 million tons of cassava (17th largest producer in the world);
- 2.7 million tons of yam (4th largest producer in the world, losing only to Nigeria, Ghana and Ivory Coast);
- 1.5 million tons of maize;
- 758 thousand tons of cotton (12th largest producer in the world);
- 598 thousand tons of palm oil;
- 459 thousand tons of rice;
- 372 thousand tons of pineapple;
- 319 thousand tons of sorghum;
- 253 thousand tons of tomato;
- 225 thousand tons of peanut;
- 221 thousand tons of soy;
- 215 thousand tons of cashew nuts (5th largest producer in the world, losing only to Vietnam, India, Ivory Coast and Philippines);

In addition to smaller productions of other agricultural products.

=== Financial Sector ===
Benin's financial sector is dominated by banks, and in general remains shallow. However, a series of reforms were undertaken in the 1990s, which resulted in the consolidation of the banking sector and in the privatization of all state banks.

A legal framework regarding licensing, bank activities, organizational and capital requirements, inspections and sanctions (all applicable to all countries of the Union) is in place and underwent significant reforms in 1999. There is no customer deposit insurance system.

Benin has a lively and diversified microfinance sector. Data from 2003 by the Central Bank stated a penetration rate of microfinance services of almost 60 percent. In 2006 the Ministry of Microfinance and Employment of Youth and Women counted 762 organizations with 1308 branches, including Cooperatives, NGOs, Savings/Credit Associations and government projects. Programmes for strengthening the sector are carried out on national and regional levels, such as the PRAFIDE (Programme Régional d’Appui à la finance Décentralisée). The microfinance sector is also subject to supervision through the Central Bank as well as the responsible Ministry for Microfinance and Employment of Youth and Women.

Benin is member of the Bourse Regionale des Valeures Mobilières (BRVM) located in Abidjan, Côte d'Ivoire. Stocks were issued by a number of companies in the region. Listed bonds were partly issued by companies and partly by governments of the West African Monetary and Economic Union (UEMOA).

The payment and settlement system and clearing mechanisms were reformed in 2004 through the BCEAO and offer RTGS and SWIFT access to banks, financial institutions, the stock exchange as well as the Central bank and special banks.

- Banque Internationale du Bénin (BI.BE)
- Bank of Africa Benin
- Continental Bank Benin
- Diamond Bank Benin (DBB)
- Ecobank
- Financial Bank
- Finadev
- Caisse Nationale d'Epargne
- Credit du Bénin
- Equibail
- United Bank of Africa
- Africa Bank for the Industry and the trade
- Sahelo-Saharian Bank of the Industry and Trade Development

=== Mining ===
The mineral industry, which is limited to the production of cement, clay, gold, sand, and gravel, does not play a significant role in the Benin's economy.

Cement was produced by Ciments du Benin S.A., Société des Ciments d’Onigbolo, and Société des Ciments du Benin. These companies had a combined cement production capacity of 1.43 million metric tons per year (Mt/yr). Gold was produced by artisanal miners from gold veins near the villages of Kwatena and Tchantangou, in the Atakora Mountains in northwestern Benin, and from alluvial sediments along the Perma River and its tributaries.

Benin ceased petroleum production from its Seme oilfield in 1998; however, at least one company, Kosmos Energy LLC of the United States, explored for petroleum in 2006. Kosmos, through its subsidiary Kosmos Energy Benin HC, had a 40% working interest in an exploration license for Block 4, which is located about 30 kilometers (km) offshore Benin. Kosmos’ venture partners were Kerr-McGee Benin Consortium S.A. (an affiliate of Kerr-McGee Corporation of the United States) (40%) and Petronas Carigali Overseas Sdn Bhd of Malaysia (20%). In 2006, the partners conducted a 1,472-square-kilometer (km2) three-dimensional (3D) seismic survey of the Block’s most prospective areas and were in the process of interpreting and reprocessing existing 3D seismic data.

=== Tourism ===
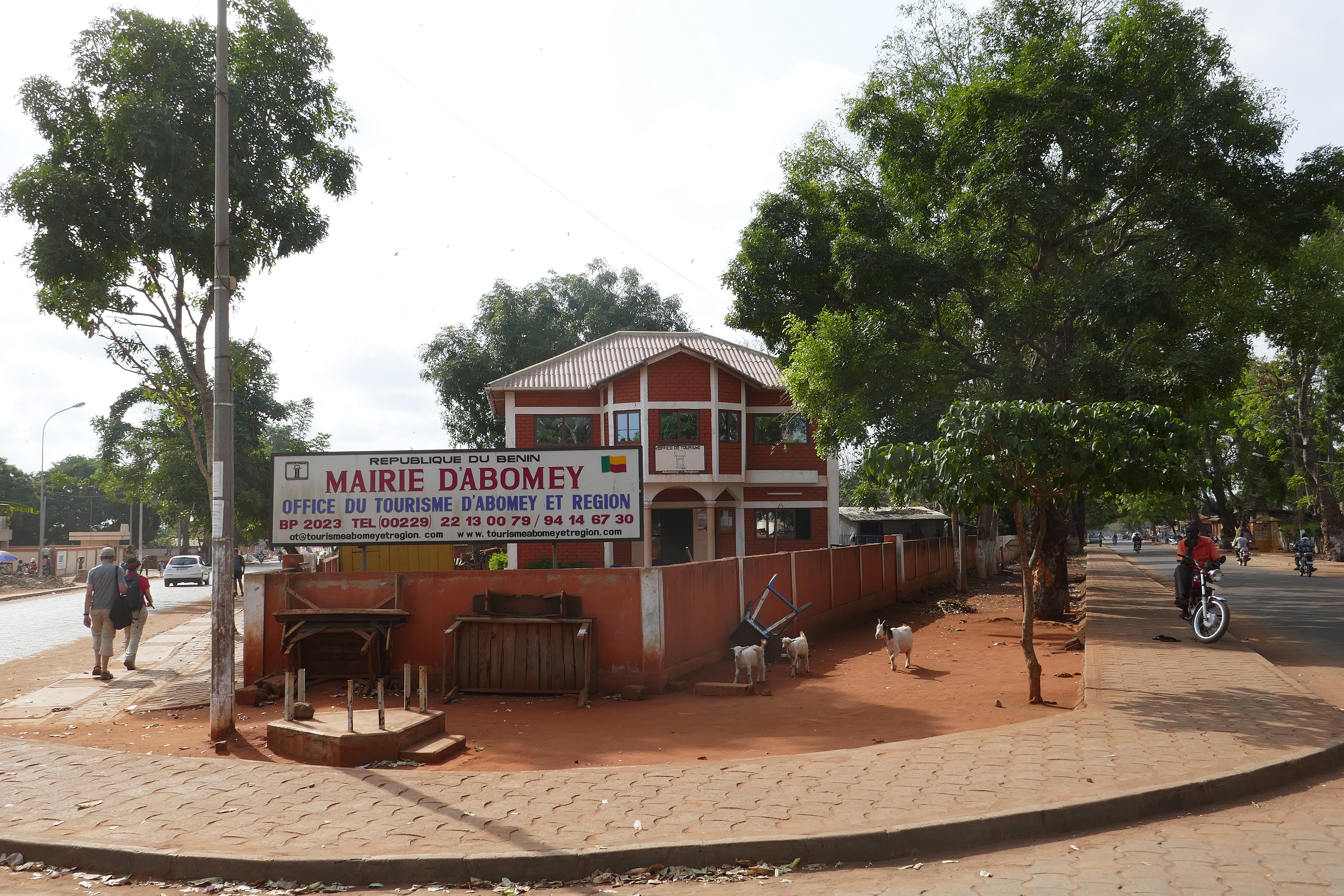
Abomey and Region Tourist Office (Benin).

Tourism in Benin is a small industry. In 1996, Benin had approximately 150,000 tourists. By 2014 number rose to 242,000. A small country with a high concentration of tourist attractions, Benin's national parks and culture are among its main tourist attractions. Abomey is one of Benin's main tourist attractions, with palaces that became a World Heritage Site in 1982. The capital city Porto-Novo's attractions include its museums and architecture.

Cotonou is the only international airport in Benin. There are direct flights to Benin from Belgium, France, and a number of African countries. There are 578 kilometres of railroad in the country, which were developed under a joint effort with the Republic of Niger.

Benin's government regards tourism as a method of diversifying its economy, attracting more foreign investment, and decreasing Benin's dependence on its agricultural industry. Although the government has a National Policy of Tourism Development, it has not made a strong effort to improve tourist facilities or to market Benin as a tourist destination.

Some of the best wildlife areas in West Africa are found in north Benin, where Pendjari National Park and W National Park are located. The best time to see the Pendjari National Park's wildlife is towards the end of the dry season. The park is accessible to travellers and accommodation is available. W National Park is located in Benin's far north, and stretches across Burkina Faso and Niger. The park has a wealth of wildlife, but is difficult to access from Benin.

== Infrastructure ==
=== Energy ===
Benin is a coastal country located in the Gulf of Guinea in Western Africa, which is a resource rich region. Energy in Benin has a diverse energy mix and takes several forms including: solar, wind, hydropower, biomass, fossil resources, and mineral resources. Out of this energy mix, about 60% of energy comes from biomass. Benin is also dependent on energy imports from Ghana and Côte d'Ivoire. While power plants and other energy facilities were built in the 1950s and 1960s, the lack of investment has led to deterioration over time. Similarly, its location in the Gulf of Guinea has led to an attempt of oil production starting in the late 1980s. However, due to unprofitable operations, oil production halted in 1998.

=== Transport ===
Benin possesses railway and road infrastructure, as well as two seaports. Benin currently does not have rail connections to other countries, but new proposals seek to change this.

== Foreign trade ==
Exports of Benin by product category (2019) Chemical products Transportation Machines Mineral products Plastics and rubbers Metals Foodstuffs Precious metals Textiles Instruments Animal products Vegetable products Paper goods Footwear and headwear Miscellaneous Stone and glass Wood products Animal and vegetable bi-products Animal hides Arts and antiques Weapons

Cargo shipped to the Port of Cotonou must be covered by a bordereau électronique de suivi des cargaisons (BESC), an electronic cargo tracking note required by Benin's customs administration.

== Macroeconomic statistics ==
The following table shows the main economic indicators in 1980–2024. Inflation below 5% is in green.

Year	GDP (in billion US$ PPP)	GDP per capita (in US$ PPP)	GDP (in billion US$ nominal)	GDP growth (real)	Inflation (in Percent)	Government debt (Percentage of GDP)
1980	3.75	1,000	2.30	▲9.3%	▲9.6%	n/a
1985	▲5.15	▲1,170	▼1.58	▲4.3%	▲1.2%	n/a
1990	▲6.62	▲1,290	▲2.89	▲9.0%	▲1.1%	n/a
1995	▲9.18	▲1,519	▲2.99	▲6.0%	▲14.5%	n/a
2000	▲12.64	▲1,806	▲3.52	▲5.9%	▲4.0%	▲39.6%
2005	▲17.16	▲2,106	▲6.57	▲1.7%	▲4.7%	▼27.0%
2006	▲18.39	▲2,189	▲7.03	▲3.9%	▲5.2%	▼8.4%
2007	▲20.02	▲2,315	▲8.17	▲6.0%	▲1.3%	▲14.3%
2008	▲21.40	▲2,403	▲9.79	▲4.9%	▲6.8%	▲18.3%
2009	▲22.04	▼2,402	▼9.73	▲2.3%	▲0.7%	▲18.7%
2010	▲22.78	▲2,411	▼9.54	▲2.1%	▲2.3%	▲21.0%
2011	▲23.93	▲2,461	▲10.69	▲3.0%	▲2.8%	▲21.9%
2012	▲25.55	▲2,552	▲11.15	▲4.8%	▲7.0%	▼19.5%
2013	▲27.86	▲2,702	▲12.52	▲7.2%	▲1.0%	▼18.5%
2014	▲30.14	▲2,840	▲13.29	▲6.4%	▲ −1.1%	▲22.3%
2015	▲30.96	▼2,832	▼11.39	▲1.8%	▲0.2%	▲30.9%
2016	▲32.30	▲2,869	▲11.82	▲3.3%	▲ −0.8%	▲35.9%
2017	▲34.75	▲2,996	▲12.70	▲5.7%	▲1.8%	▲39.6%
2018	▲36.69	▲3,073	▲14.26	▲6.7%	▲0.8%	▲41.1%
2019	▲40.08	▲3,261	▲14.39	▲6.9%	▲ −0.9%	▲41.2%
2020	▲42.41	▲3,354	▲15.67	▲3.8%	▲3.0%	▲46.1%
2021	▲46.47	▲3,575	▲17.70	▲7.2%	▲1.7%	▲50.3%
2022	▲52.89	▲3,961	▼17.44	▲6.3%	▲1.4%	▲54.2%
2023	▲58.28	▲4,244	▲19.68	▲6.4%	▲2.8%	▲54.5%
2024	▲63.54	▲4,501	▲21.32	▲6.5%	▲2.0%	▼54.0%

== See also ==
- Agriculture in Benin
- Fishing in Benin
- United Nations Economic Commission for Africa
- Foreign trade of Benin
