= Energy in Benin =

Benin is a coastal country located in the Gulf of Guinea in Western Africa, which is a resource rich region. Energy in Benin has a diverse energy mix and takes several forms including: solar, wind, hydropower, biomass, fossil resources, and mineral resources. Out of this energy mix, about 60% of energy comes from biomass. Benin is also dependent on energy imports from Ghana and Côte d'Ivoire. While power plants and other energy facilities were built in the 1950s and 1960s, the lack of investment has led to deterioration over time. Similarly, its location in the Gulf of Guinea has led to an attempt of oil production starting in the late 1980s. However, due to unprofitable operations, oil production halted in 1998.

== Electricity ==
Benin imports some of its electricity from Nigeria through the CEB-NEPA Power Interconnection, commissioned in 2007.

Generation type	Installed power in 2019 (MW)
Diesel and heavy fuel oil	249
Hydro	100
Total	349

=== Access to Electricity ===
There is a disparity of access between urban and rural citizens. In 2010, around 34.2% of the population had access to electricity. The urban population had significantly greater access at 65.4% while the only 13.9% of the rural population had access. The government attempted to bridge the gap by implementing a rural electrification program that seeks to increase levels of electrification in rural areas to 36% by 2015. As of 2020, approximately 32% of Benin's population has access to electricity, leaving approximately 1.5 million citizens without access. On average, 56% of the urban population has access to electricity, while only about 11% has access in rural areas. While the urban population has proportionally more access to electricity, they also face issues such as electricity shortage and outages. In 2016, it was reported that on average there are 28 electrical outages in Benin. Accessibility to electricity is interconnected with the performance of the economy, and around 60% of firms state that electricity is their major constraint. Additionally, the country's statistics show that there is a discrepancy between renewable energy consumption and renewable electricity output. In 2014, renewable energy consumption was 48.6%, while the renewable electricity output was 0.5%. While Benin has many energy resources, it lacks the infrastructure both to convert these resources into electricity and to transport the electricity throughout the country.

==== Addressing Energy Resource Accessibility Challenges ====
Energy resources in Benin and most Western African countries are not evenly distributed. Yet, energy services and accessibility are important factors towards economic and industrial development. Thus, in 1975 the Economic Community of West African States (ECOWAS), consisting of 15 nations, was formed. The goal of this organization was not only to promote economic growth, development, and cooperation, but also to link the power networks to ensure power security. Under ECOWAS, the West African Power Pool (WAPP) was created with headquarters in Benin and the goal of furthering the goal of combining each nations power system into a regional source to provide more reliable energy services Out of the 15 nations that are part of ECOWAS, 14 joined WAPP.

===== International Support =====
Power Africa is an organization launched in 2013 by Barack Obama through the United States Agency for International Development (USAID) that brings together experts, private sector investors, and government institutions to help people gain accessibility to power. The organization's goal is to invest and develop in renewable and sustainable energy and promote greater access. The current partnership is between United States and six other African countries—Tanzania, Kenya, Ethiopia, Ghana, Nigeria and Ghana—as well as banks in Africa such as the African Development Bank Group (AfDB). In dealing with the energy needs in Nigeria, Rural electrification project has been embarked on by the Government with funding from international community. The main focus of the project is to augment the energy source with solar energy, it partnered with solar companies to carry out the project.

Based on the Human Development Index report of 2018, Benin ranks 163 out of 189 countries as about 66.8% of the population faces poverty. Many people still have limited access to electricity and maintenance and development of utilities and services requires financial support. Power Africa has provided partnership of the Benin's government with the Millennium Challenge Corporation (MCC), which will assist in reinforcing the power sector in Benin. The $375 million grant towards this project will assist in designing and construction of a more reliable power system as well as strengthening the infrastructure.

== Oil ==
The company responsible for petroleum imports is Société Nationale de Commercialisation des Produits Pétroliers (SONACOP).

Benin ceased petroleum production from its Seme oilfield in 1998. America's Kosmos Energy LLC explored for petroleum in 2006.

In recent years, there has been an attempt to revive the oil production and industry in Benin. In September 2019, Niger and China launched the construction of the Niger-Benin Oil Pipeline. This pipeline, roughly 1980 kilometers (1230 miles), will run from the Diffa Region in the Southeast of Niger to the Port Seme Terminal in Benin. The projected pipeline is to have two thirds run through Niger and one third through Benin. Previously, Niger exported its oil through Chad in order to reach a Cameroon port; however, there has been much instability in the Sahel region. The Niger-Benin Oil Pipeline project is projected to take about two and a half years. It is estimated that this pipeline will increase Niger's oil export as well as create economic traffic for Benin.

== Natural gas ==
The company responsible for gas imports is Société Beninoise de Gaz. Natural gas is supplied to Benin by the West African Gas Pipeline.

=== West African Gas Pipeline (WAGP) ===
The West African Gas Pipeline Company Limited (WAPCo) owns the West African Gas Pipeline (WAGP). The pipeline transports natural gas and extends from Itoki, Nigeria to Benin, Togo, Ghana. It is one of the largest projects regarding fossil fuel on the continent and the first to be constructed in sub-Saharan Africa. Although Benin has natural gas reserves, there is no active production. The WAGP Project, started in 2004, serves as an alternative to bring more stable forms of electricity generation into the households and firms. The development of the pipeline also brings more economic opportunities both in terms of industrial development and job opportunities.
