= West African Airlines =

Airline of Benin

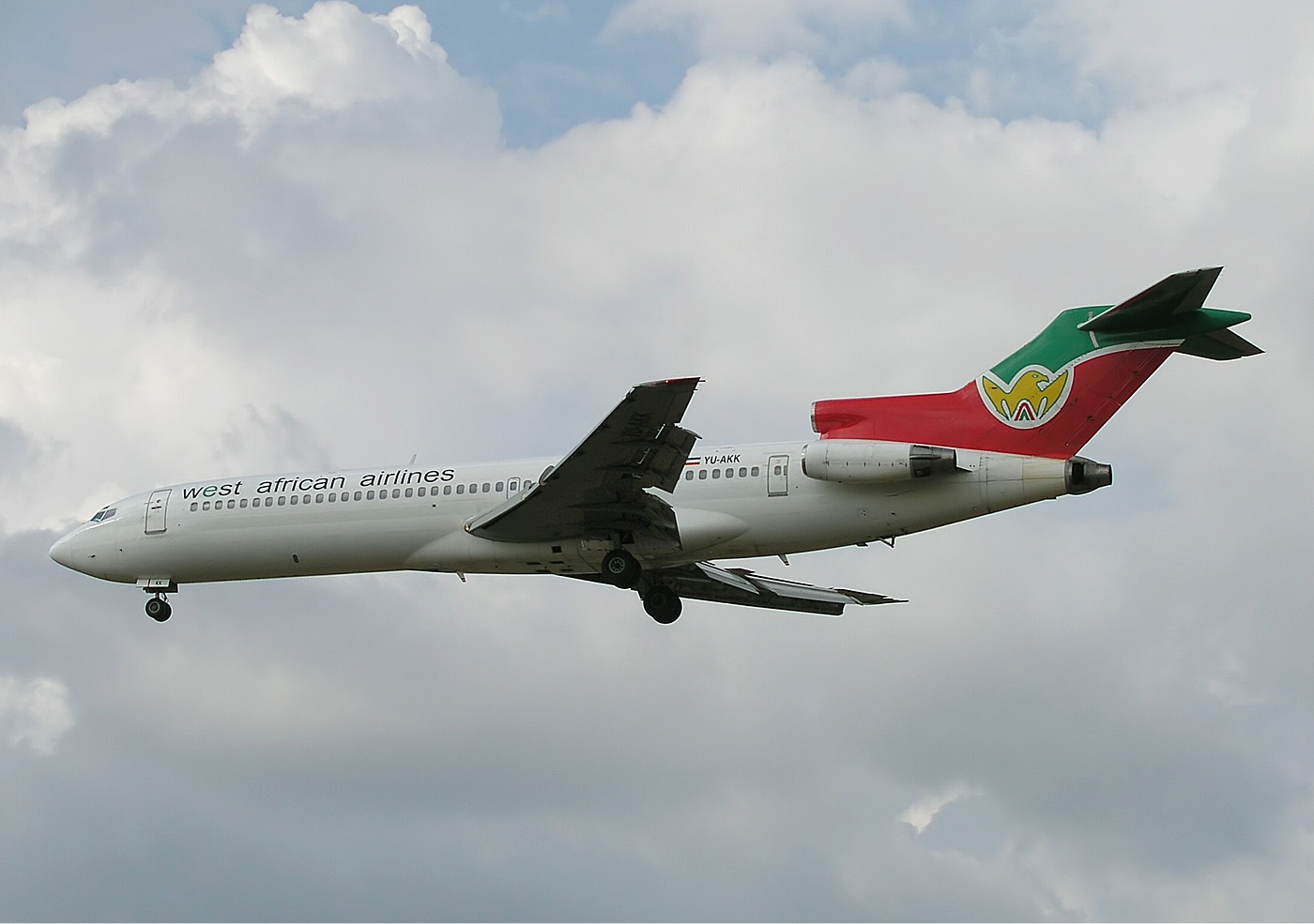
- West African Airlines Boeing 727 leased from JAT Airways (2003)
IATA	ICAO	Call sign
WZ	WSF	–
- Founded: 2003
- Ceased operations: 2004
- Hubs: Cadjehoun Airport
- Fleet size: 2x Boeing 727
- Destinations: See Destinations (below)

West African Airlines (IATA: WZ, ICAO: WSF, call sign: n/a) was a scheduled passenger and cargo airline based in Cotonou, Benin. It operated regional flights, with an extension to Europe, using wet-leased aircraft. The airline was established in 2003 and started operations on 29 June 2003. However, it went bankrupt the following year.

== Destinations ==
International scheduled destinations included: Abidjan, Accra, Bamako, Bangui, Banjul, Brazzaville, Conakry, Dakar, Douala, Freetown, Johannesburg, Kinshasa, Lagos, Libreville, Lomé, N'djamena, Paris and Pointe-Noire and to Delhi and Bombay.

== See also ==
- List of defunct airlines of Benin
