= Westair Benin =

2002–2015 airline in Benin

IATA	ICAO	Call sign
WH	WSF	-
- Founded: November 2002
- Ceased operations: 2015
- Hubs: Cadjehoun Airport
- Fleet size: 3
- Destinations: 11
- Headquarters: Cotonou, Benin
- Website: www.westairbenin.com

Westair Benin is an airline based in Cotonou, Benin. It was established and started operations in November 2002 and operated regional flights in West Africa. Its main base is Cadjehoun Airport. The airline ceased operations in 2015 but was said to be restarting operations as of mid-2016.

== Destinations ==
Westair Benin operated regional services from Cotonou to 8 destinations throughout West Africa for Winter Season 2012/2013:

Benin

- Cotonou – Cadjehoun Airport Main Hub

Burkina Faso

- Ouagadougou – Ouagadougou Airport

Cameroon

- Douala – Douala Airport

Democratic Republic of the Congo

- Kinshasa – N'djili Airport

Republic of the Congo

- Brazzaville – Maya-Maya Airport
- Pointe-Noire – Antonio Agostinho Neto Airport

Côte d'Ivoire

- Abidjan – Port Bouet Airport

Equatorial Guinea

- Malabo – Malabo International Airport

Gabon

- Libreville – Leon M'ba Airport

Niger

- Niamey – Diori Hamani Airport

Nigeria

- Abuja – Nnamdi Azikiwe Airport

== Fleet ==
The Westair Benin fleet consists of the following aircraft (as of July 2015):

Westair Benin fleet
Aircraft	In Fleet	Orders	Passengers			<Notes
Aircraft	In Fleet	Orders	C	Y	Total	<Notes
Boeing 737-200	1	—	12	113	125	
Boeing 737-400	1	—	12	132	144	
Bombardier CRJ200	1	—	—	50	50	
Total	3	—				

== See also ==
- List of defunct airlines of Benin
