= Transportation in Shreveport =

Shreveport is the third most populous city and the principal city of the third largest metropolitan area in the U.S. state of Louisiana, as well as being the 147th most populous city in the United States.

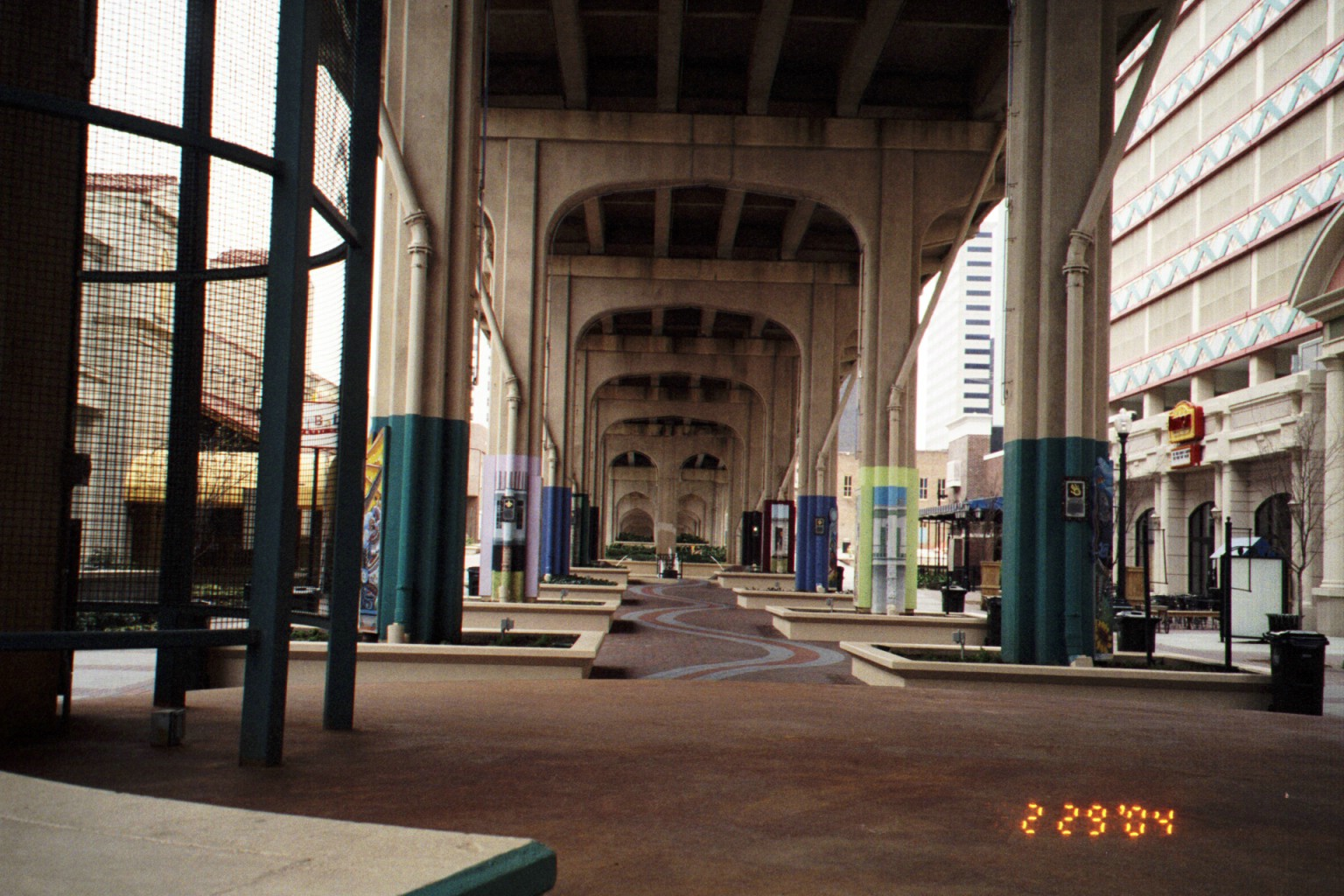
Underside of Texas Street Bridge (the Long–Allen Bridge) in the Shreveport riverfront district

== Roads and highways ==
Shreveport's past reflects the need for mass transit and public roads. As far back as the 1870s residents used mule-drawn streetcars that were later converted to electric-motorized cars by 1890. Commuter rail in Shreveport flourished for many decades, and rail car lines extended out to rural areas. In the 1930 the trolleys and rail cars were replaced by rubber-wheel trolleys and buses. In the 1960s the interstate system came to the area with construction of Interstate 20.

The highway system has a cross-hair and loop freeway structure. The loop consist of Interstate 220 on the north and Louisiana Highway 3132 on the south, forming approximately a 8-mile (13 km) diameter semi-loop around downtown.

Shreveport lies along the route of the proposed Interstate 69 NAFTA superhighway that will link Canada, the U.S. industrial Midwest, Texas, and Mexico.

=== I-49 expansion ===
Shreveport to Kansas City

In 2005 Gov. Kathleen Blanco signed legislation to fund the expansion of I-49 to the Arkansas border where it will meet the already completed section to Texarkana. I-49 is proposed to be a corridor through to Kansas City, MO. The current terminus of I-49 in Lafayette, Louisiana is to be extended to New Orleans, Louisiana in the same bill.

=== The I-69 project ===
The current plans for I-69 around Shreveport also known as (SIU 15) are to build a new freeway bypassing the urbanized area to the south and east. Unlike I-49 and I-20, I-69's proposed route does not go through Shreveport; but will provide for a completed loop for the Inner Loop Expressway. However, access to and from Downtown Shreveport via I-49 and I-20 will not be problematic.

The plans for this segment call for interchanges at:

- U.S. 171 north or south of Stonewall
- I-49
- LA 1
- US 71
- I-20 east or west of Haughton

As of January 2003, there is a "preferred corridor" within which the actual highway alignments will be developed.

Shreveport to Houston

During 2002 and 2003, it was decided that Texas Gov. Rick Perry's Trans-Texas Corridor proposal would be the basis for developing Interstate 69 in Texas. Accordingly, the original division of the route into this route is being treated as preliminary, and the entire corridor in the state (as well as the connection near Shreveport, La.) will be studied using a unified, two-tier Environmental Impact Statement process.

Shreveport to Memphis

The process is underway from I-20 at Haughton, Louisiana to U.S. 82 west of El Dorado, Arkansas; from U.S. 82 west of El Dorado to U.S. 65; from U.S. 65 to the Charles W. Dean Bridge or Great River Bridge; from Charles W. Dean/Great River Bridge to Robinsonville, Mississippi

A Final Environmental Impact Statement has been approved for the Southeast Arkansas I-69 Connector (I-530 extension). Right-of-way acquisition and some construction is currently underway.

=== The inner loop expressway (LA 3132) ===
Bert Kouns Industrial Loop to Flournoy Lucas Rd.

This section is now open.

=== Intelligent transportation system in Shreveport/Bossier ===
In 2005 the Louisiana Department of Transportation and Development announced the implementation of an Intelligent Transportation System, to monitor traffic via video cameras, erecting digital message boards all over the metro area and AM radio broadcast to alert motorist of special or emergency road conditions. Plus vehicle radar detectors will be installed on freeways to measure drive times from point A to point B. These drive times will be displayed on the digital message boards around town.

To implement the ITS field deployment for the region, it will consist of 579 radar vehicle detectors (RVDs), 220 closed-circuit television (CCTV) cameras, 15 dynamic message signs (DMSs), signal system improvements at 395 intersections, 10 weather stations, and 4 highway advisory radio (HAR) stations.

== Mass transit ==
SporTran provides public transportation in the form of buses and lift vans. SporTran is one of the oldest public transportation systems in the south. It has been in continual service for over 125 years with only one interruption due to the strike of 1957.

SporTran uses a fleet of over 50 buses and lift vans, including hybrid vehicles.

== Airports ==
Shreveport is served by two airports, the largest of which is the Shreveport Regional Airport (SHV). After World War II, the demand for expanded airline service in Shreveport increased. In addition, longer runways were required to accommodate the new generation of jet aircraft. Because of land limitations, the closely located Shreveport central business district and military aircraft traffic from nearby Barksdale Air Force, the decision was made to build an entirely new airport on the western edges of Shreveport.

In May 1947, the city committed $2.4 million for its share of a new terminal building for the new airport. In 1948, the city retained an architectural engineering firm to recommend an airport site. In 1949, a general election was held and the current airport site was approved. Initial construction of Greater Shreveport Municipal Airport consisted of a 6,400-foot (2,000 m) by 20-foot (6.1 m) runway with a full length parallel taxiway.

In 1998, ground was broken on a $30 million expansion/renovation project at Shreveport Regional. The expansion included the addition of a 66,000-square-foot (6,100 m^{2}) terminal building on the eastern side of the concourses and administration building. The new facility allowed the airport to consolidate all airline ticket counters and rental cars into one operation, as well as centralized baggage claim operations. During construction, the facilities built in 1971 and 1972 were completely renovated. These renovations included remodeling the restaurant, airport security, airport administration offices, the concourses, bathrooms, passenger loading gates and elevators. Additionally, all heating/air conditioning, fire protection, plumbing and electrical systems were upgraded. Additionally, the parking lots were reconfigured and repaved, along with new parking booths added.

The expansion/renovations were unveiled to the public with a November 1999 soft opening to allow passengers to use the new terminal in time for the busy Thanksgiving holiday travel season. Since that time, the Shreveport Airport Authority has continued to fine-tune the new facility and is continuing to make changes to improve passenger service.

Today, the airport is served by seven airlines, and nearly all major cargo carriers. Passenger airlines that operate out of SHV

The second airport is Shreveport Downtown Airport (DTN). The Downtown Municipal Airport is a general aviation/reliever airport located north of the Downtown Business District. The airport is located along the Red River and is the original Shreveport commercial airport, dating to back to 1931. It offers two runways, with the primary runway, Runway 14/32, measuring 5,017 feet (1,529 m) long by 150 feet (46 m) wide. The Runway is asphalt and was resurfaced in December 2000. Runway 5/23 measures 3,200 feet (980 m) long by 75 feet (23 m) wide. The Airport is considered a general aviation/reliever airport. Numerous owners of small private aircraft house aircraft there. Fixed-Base Operator at Downtown Airport is Royal Air. Also, Southern University operates an Airframe and Power plant (A&P) School which provides certification for aircraft mechanics.

Both airports are under the Shreveport Airport Authority.
