= Cbnd =

CBND may refer to:

- Cannabinodiol, a cannabinoid
- Compagnie Béninoise de Négoce et de Distribution, a retail and trading company in Benin
