= West African Bankers' Association =

Bankers Association, West Africa

- Association des banques de l'Afrique de l'ouest (ABAO)
- Abbreviation: WABA
- Type: Industry trade group and professional association
- Legal status: Western Union
- Region served: West Africa
- Secretary General: Agbai Abosi
- President: Eddy Ogbogu
- Affiliations: With Western Union
- Website: www.waba-abao.org

The West African Bankers' Association (WABA; French: Association des banques de l'Afrique de l'ouest (ABAO)) is a professional association of banking and financial services and institutions in West Africa.

It has its headquarters and offices in Benin, Burkina Faso, Cape Verde, Gambia, Ghana, Guinea, Guinea-Bissau, Ivory Coast, Liberia, Mali, Niger, Nigeria, Senegal, Sierra Leone, and Togo.

== History ==
The WABA was created on August 10, 1981 with the main purpose of supporting and developing the West African Clearing House (WACH).

== Membership and organization ==
The organization has banking, securities, and auditing institutions, and individual members. The secretary general is Sega Balde, with Rev Ifeanyi IWANDE as president.

The central banks of each participating countries financed the association. The WABA serves as an intermediary between banks and the sub-regional committee of the central banks.

The association is located in Freetown, Sierra Leone.

== See also ==
- Banque Internationale du Bénin
- Central Bank of West African States
- Economic Community of West African States
- Financial Bank Benin associated with phone number+229)62057804
- Yaw Osafo-Marfo
