= Foreign trade of Benin =

Foreign trade, particularly informal transit trade, plays an important role in Benin's economy.

== Trading partners ==
Benin serves as a delivery corridor for West Africa reaching more than 100 million people in the landlocked countries of Niger, Mali, Burkina Faso, Chad, and the northern states of Nigeria. Goods landed in Cotonou get placed on trucks first heading north to the border towns of Malanville in Benin and Gaya in Niger and then onto the rest of the Sahel. Parakou is the major crossroad town in Benin, where goods going west to Togo, Ghana, and Burkina Faso pass, and goods going into Nigeria transit before heading to various border crossings. The Sèmè/Kraké border crossing with Nigeria along the coastal road is a major trade nexus for many of the agricultural products imported into Benin.

Benin's traditional trade links with the European Union, in particular France and Belgium, remain strong. There is presence of Chinese foodstuffs in the open-air markets and supermarkets. Benin's major trade partners include Nigeria, France, Belgium, Spain, Switzerland, Argentina, Brazil, the United States, China, and the United Arab Emirates.

The major regional trading partners include Niger, Togo, Nigeria, and Burkina Faso. Estimates of annual trade with these countries are extremely hard to determine, but some sources indicate that Benin exports about 15,000 tons (Note: All "ton" or "t" figures in this article are given in metric tons. One metric ton is equivalent to approximately 2,204.6 pounds, 1.102 short tons (US), or 0.984 long tons (UK).) of corn and 1,500 tons of rice to Nigeria, 6,000 tons of corn to Niger, 1,400 tons of corn and 2,000 tons of rice to Togo. Vegetables and animals move across these borders in large amounts in regular patterns. In “crisis years” where local crops are underproduced, Benin has sourced as much as 9,500 tons of corn and 950 tons of rice from Togo, and 6,000 tons of rice and 1,800 tons of corn from Nigeria. Nigeria's 170 million people and the country's income from oil also influence the economy of Benin significantly. Informal trade between Nigeria and Benin is substantial. Importers take advantage of Nigeria's high tariff changes and porous borders to export unrecorded rice, poultry products and other food and agricultural products to Nigeria. Trade sources estimate that more than 85% of these types of products that are shipped to Benin are meant for onward sales into Nigeria through informal cross-border trading activities. While Nigerian brokers can travel up to farms in Benin to buy vegetables, local buyers often transport their fruits, mostly pineapple and oranges, to markets on the Benin-Nigeria border. The Sèmè/Kraké border market is the best known market of the country for pineapple and orange transactions, where Nigerian brokers load up vehicles bound for Nigeria. This border crossing is also where the majority of other imported agricultural products leave Benin for Nigeria, including palm oil, rice, refined sugar, and poultry meat. According to border-based sources, Kalalè, Caldel, and Onazal in Benin are the three major border towns for the routes of cross-border trade with Nigeria. However, women carrying baskets filled with yams and other items regularly pass over the border at Chikandou in central Benin heading to the Nigerian town of Tchikanda.

Benin has recognized the importance of trade transit and providing predictable policies for traders. Benin was ranked by the World Bank's annual 2014 "Doing Business" guide as 174 out of 189 countries, making it the third year in a row that Benin climbed in its ranking. Benin has lowered barriers to starting businesses by establishing a one-stop window for setting up a business, lowering time needed from ten to three days; and has boosted trading by creating a one-stop window for customs clearance at the Port of Cotonou now taking only three days, instead of the 15-30 needed previously. The Port of Cotonou has received two international awards in 2014 for information technology and public-private partnership, due in large part to the improvements in port operations resulting from reforms stimulated by the Millennium Challenge Corporation compact and U.S. Coast Guard assistance to meet international standards on security compliance. It is becoming one of the major ports in West Africa.

== Trade law ==
Benin is signatory to all international trade conventions under the aegis of the World Trade Organization and the United Nations Conference on Trade and Development. Benin is also a member of the Cotonou Agreement among the European Union, Africa, and Caribbean and Pacific countries, and the regional and sub-regional economic unions such as the Economic Community of West African States (ECOWAS) and the West African Economic and Monetary Union (WAEMU), and it is party to the African Growth and Opportunity Act.

Benin applies a common external tariff (CET – Tarif Exterieur Commun, TEC in French) together with other countries belonging to WAEMU - Burkina Faso, Côte d'Ivoire, Guinea-Bissau, Mali, Niger, Senegal, and Togo. The CET establishes four categories of products on which tariffs are zero, five, 10, and 20%. Benin's enactment of the CET and its accession to the World Trade Organization have eliminated many trade barriers.

Benin has signed bilateral trade agreements for the promotion and the protection of investments with Germany, Tunisia, Switzerland, China, Portugal, Greece, France, and the United States.

Currently imports of all products are allowed and there are no indications that this will change in the foreseeable future. The Lagos post of the USDA Foreign Agricultural Service dealt with only two trade issues between 2010 and 2014, both of which were easily and successfully resolved.

== General import and inspection procedures ==
Documents related to import requirements vary depending on the type of the imported goods and they are not specific to food inspection. In general, the documents to be produced by importers before the clearing of goods are the invoice, bill of lading, and pre-shipment inspection certificate issued by Bureau Veritas, the importer's import license, attestation of origin of the goods (originated from a WAEMU or ECOWAS member state), and an animal or plant health inspection SPS certificate if appropriate.

All maritime shipments to Benin must be accompanied by a Bordereau Électronique de Suivi des Cargaisons (Electronic Cargo Tracking Note) issued prior to arrival; the (BESC / ECTN) number must be declared on the bill of lading and is required for customs admissibility at the port.

== Import duties and collections ==
In general, imports from non-WAEMU countries are subject to 48% import duty on the value of the goods. On top of these customs duties, importers are required to pay 18% value-added tax (VAT) at the point of entry.

Maritime cargo bound for Benin must be covered by an Electronic Cargo Tracking Note (French: Bordereau électronique de suivi des cargaisons, BESC), introduced for the Port of Cotonou and administered by the Conseil National des Chargeurs du Bénin (CNCB); shipment data are recorded before arrival to support cargo tracking and customs clearance.
