= List of airlines of Benin =

This is a list of currently operating and former airlines in Benin.

== Active airlines ==
Amazone Airlines is the only airline operating scheduled flights in the country.

Airline	Image	IATA	ICAO	Callsign	Commenced operations	Notes	References
Amazone Airlines		PL	ABT	BENWAYS	March 2026	Formed through the merger of Bénin Airlines and Cronos Airlines Bénin	

== Defunct airlines ==
The following airlines are either defunct or presumed to be defunct.

Airline	Image	IATA	ICAO	Callsign	Commenced operations	Ceased operations	Notes	References
Aero Benin		EM	AEB	AEROBEN	2002	—N/a		
Afric'Air Charters		—N/a	AFF	BENIN-CHARTERS	2002	—N/a		
Africa Airways		VJ	AFF	AFRIWAYS	—N/a	—N/a	Did not start operations.	
Air Afrique		RK	RKA	AIRAFRIC	1961	2002		
Afrique Airlines		X5	FBN	AFRIQUE-BENIN	2002	2006		
Afro Unity Airways		—N/a	AFU	AFRO UNITY	1960s	1970s		
Air Benin/Transports Aériens du Bénin		—N/a	TSB	AIR BENIN	1978	1987		
Air Taxi Bénin/Bénin Airlines		—N/a	ABT	BENWAYS	2010s	2020s		
Alafia Jet		—N/a	IGA	—N/a	—N/a	—N/a		
Benin Air Cargo		—N/a	BEN	BENIN CARGO	—N/a	—N/a		
Benin Air Express		—N/a	BEX	BENIN EXPRESS	1990s	—N/a		
Bénin Golf Air		A8	BGL	BENIN GOLF	2002	—N/a		
Bénin Inter Regional		—N/a	STB	BENIN-INTER	1991	—N/a	Subsidiary of Benin-based SNCI-Tours; set up in collaboration with Aeroflot.	
Bénin Littoral Airways		—N/a	LTL	LITTORAL	2000s	—N/a		
COTAIR		—N/a	COB	COTAIR BENIN	2008	2009		
Cronos Airlines Benin		—N/a	CKL	SPACE	2023	2020s		
Nord-Sud Bénin		—N/a	NSB	NORD-SUD	1990s	—N/a		
Royal Air		—N/a	BNR	BENIN ROYAL	2008	—N/a		
Trans Air Bénin		N4	TNB	TRANS-BENIN	2000	—N/a		
West African Airlines		WZ	WSF	—N/a	2003	—N/a		
Westair Benin		WH	WSF	—N/a	2002	2015		
Zircon Airways Benin		Z4	BZW	—N/a	2000s	—N/a		

== See also ==
- List of airlines
- List of air carriers banned in the European Union
- List of defunct airlines of Benin
