= COTAIR =

Airline based in Cotonou, Benin

COTAIR (Côte Atlantique Inter Régional)
- Founded: 2008
- Ceased operations: 2009
- Hubs: Cotonou Cadjehoun Airport
- Fleet size: 2
- Destinations: 2
- Headquarters: Cotonou, Benin
- Key people: Thiburce Montcho (CEO)
- Website: http://www.cotair.info/

COTAIR - an acronym for Côte Atlantique Inter Régional - was an airline based in Cotonou, Benin. It was established in 2008 and operated scheduled domestic flights in Benin and non-scheduled regional charter flights in West Africa. Its main base was Cotonou Cadjehoun Airport (COO). COTAIR ceased operations on 31 December 2009

== Destinations ==
COTAIR operated domestic services from Cotonou to Parakou. Additionally it offered on-demand charter-flights throughout western Africa.

COTAIR was on the list of air carriers banned from operating within the European Union.

== Fleet ==
The COTAIR fleet consisted of the following aircraft (as of 20 June 2010):

- 2 Let L-410 UVP

== See also ==
- List of defunct airlines of Benin
