= Afrique Airlines =

Airline of Benin

IATA	ICAO	Call sign
X5	FBN (not current)	AFRIQUE BENIN (not current)
- Founded: 2002
- Commenced operations: 2003
- Ceased operations: 2006
- Fleet size: 1
- Destinations: 2
- Headquarters: Cotonou, Benin

Afrique Airlines was an airline based in Cotonou, Benin. It was established in 2002 and operated scheduled passenger service between Benin and Paris in France out of Cadjehoun Airport until the end of 2003. In 2006, the company was officially dissolved.

== Fleet ==
Afrique Airlines operated one Airbus A310-300, which was leased from Eagle Aviation France.
