= Trans Air Benin =

Airline of Benin (2000–2016)

IATA	ICAO	Call sign
N4	TNB	TRANS BENIN
- Founded: November 2000
- Ceased operations: 2016
- Hubs: Cadjehoun Airport
- Fleet size: See Fleet below
- Destinations: See Destinations below

Trans Air Benin — national air transport company, operating regular and irregular passenger.

== History ==
Trans Air Bénin was founded in November 2000. Operated a leased Boeing 737-200, the carrier initiates twice-weekly roundtrips on November 17 from Cotonou to Ouagadougou, Burkina Faso, via Niamey, Niger. Trans Air Benin is on the list of air carriers banned from operating within the European Union.

== Destinations ==
=== Domestic ===
- Natitingou
- Parakou

=== International ===
- Abidjan, Côte d'Ivoire
- Bamako, Mali
- Brazzaville, Republic of Congo
- Dakar, Senegal
- Lomé, Togo
- Pointe-Noire, Republic of Congo

== Fleet ==
- 1 - Antonov An-24
- 1 - Boeing 727
- 1 - DHC-6 Twin Otters
- 1 - Let L-410 Turbolet

== See also ==
- List of defunct airlines of Benin
