= Royal Air =

Airline of Benin

IATA	ICAO	Call sign
—	RYL	—
- Ceased operations: 2012
- Hubs: Cadjehoun Airport
- Fleet size: 1
- Headquarters: Cotonou, Benin

Royal Air was a charter airline based in Cotonou, Benin. Its main base was Cadjehoun Airport. As of July 2012, it is no longer in business.

== Fleet ==
The Royal Air fleet included the following aircraft (as of 19 July 2009):

- 1 Boeing 727-100

== See also ==
- List of defunct airlines of Benin
