= CEB–NEPA Power Interconnection =

CEB–NEPA Power Interconnection is a 70 kilometres (43 mi) long 330 kV powerline between Sakété (Benin) and Ikeja (Nigeria). It connects Nigeria's power grid (NEPA) with Benin's grid (CEB).

== History ==
The project started in December 2001 and was officially opened on 13 February 2007. The purpose of the power line is to supply electricity from Nigeria to Benin and Togo.

== Description ==
The interconnection consists of 54 kilometres (34 mi) of a 330 kV single circuit line from Ikeja West substation in Nigeria to Nigeria – Benin border and 16 kilometres (9.9 mi) of a 330 kV single circuit line from Nigeria – Benin border to the Sakete 330/161 kV substation. The planned area is split between Sakete and Ifagni in the Benin Republic and Lagos and Ogun States in Nigeria. The overall project area is roughly situated between latitude 60o 22' and 60o 42' N and between longitudes 20o 42' and 32' E. It spans from Sakete in the Benin Republic to Ayobo in Lagos State.
