= List of banks in Benin =

This is a list of commercial banks in Benin, based on the register of institutions regulated by the Banking Commission of the West African Monetary Union, updated 29 June 2026.

== List of commercial banks ==
- Bank of Africa Bénin, part of Bank of Africa Group
- Banque Atlantique Bénin, part of BCP Group
- Banque Internationale pour l'Industrie et le Commerce (BIIC), formerly Banque Internationale du Bénin
- Banque Sahélo-Saharienne pour l'Investissement et le Commerce (BSIC-Benin), part of the BSIC Group
- BGFIBank Benin, part of BGFIBank Group
- Bange Bank Benin, part of BANGE Group
- Coris Bank International Benin, part of Coris Bank Group
- Ecobank Benin, part of Ecobank Group
- NSIA Banque Benin, part of NSIA Group
- Orabank Benin, part of Orabank Group; formerly Financial Bank Benin
- Société Générale Bénin, sold by Société Générale to the Beninois state in 2024
- United Bank for Africa - Benin (UBA-Benin), part of UBA Group
- Branch of CBAO Groupe Attijariwafa Bank
- Branch of Société Nigérienne de Banque (Sonibank)

== See also ==
- Central Bank of West African States
- List of banks in Africa
