= Zircon Airways Benin =

Airline of Benin

IATA	ICAO	Call sign
Z4	BZW	ZIRCON
- Founded: 2001
- Ceased operations: 2002
- Key people: Joseph Hopewell, Malcolm Mascarenas

Zircon Airways Benin was an airline based in Benin. It was founded in 2001 and ceased operations in 2002.

== Code data ==
- IATA Code: Z4
- ICAO Code: BZW (not current)
- Callsign: ZIRCON (not current)

== See also ==
- List of defunct airlines of Benin
