= Eagle Aviation France =

Charter airline based in Saint-Nazaire, France

Eagle Aviation
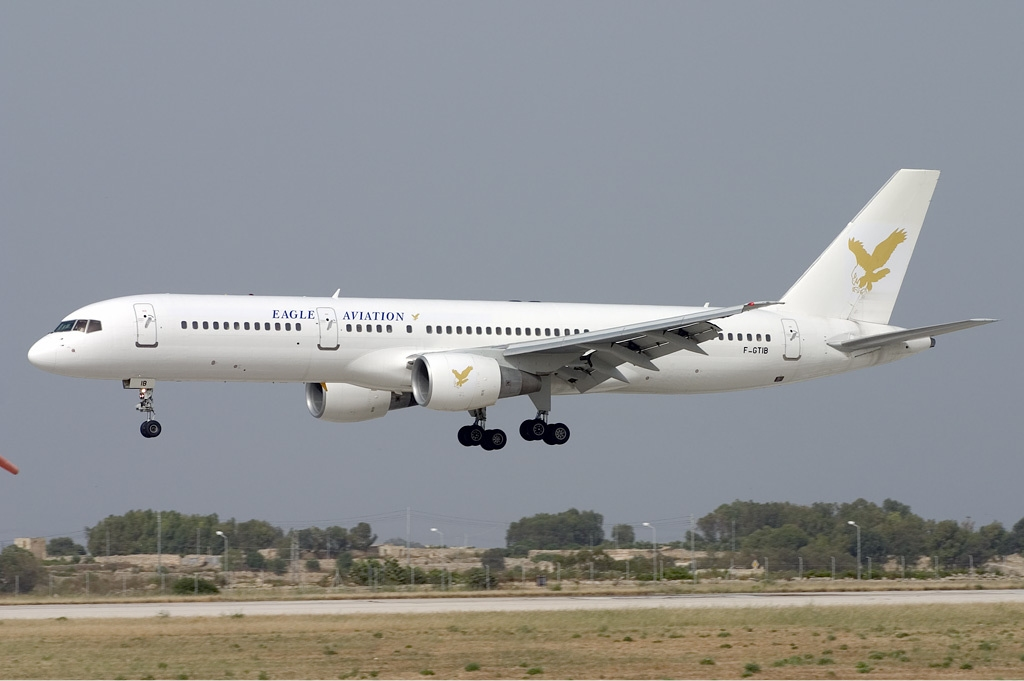
- Boeing 757-200
IATA	ICAO	Call sign
-	EGN	FRENCH EAGLE
- Founded: 1998
- Ceased operations: 2009
- Fleet size: 2
- Headquarters: Saint-Nazaire, France
- Website: http://www.eagle-aviation.net/

Eagle Aviation France was a charter airline based in Saint-Nazaire, France. Its wet lease operations were based in Paris at Charles de Gaulle Airport.

== History ==
It was established in Liberia in 1996. The airline started operations in 2002. It was placed in receivership in February 2009 and acquired by the EVSEN Group, named after its Azerbaijani-born director, Elnur Stern. All operations were halted in January 2010. The airline was revived in March 2009 as Noor Airways, operating a single aircraft.

== Fleet ==
The Eagle Aviation France fleet consists of the following aircraft (as of July 2009) :

- 1 Boeing 747-400
- 1 Boeing 757-200 *
