= Financial Bank Benin =

Former bank in Benin

Financial Bank Benin was a commercial bank in Benin and a member of the West African Bankers' Association.

It had its headquarters in Cotonou and branches in cities such as Parakou. The bank was dominated by Swiss ownership, with Financial BC in Geneva having an 85% share, Aiglon S.A. in Geneva with 15% and private French shares (0.01%).

The bank had a 25% share in the Benin microfinance group Finadev.

In 2011, Orabank took over the operations of the then-defunct Financial Bank Group.

== See also ==
- List of banks in Benin
