= Société Nationale de Commercialisation des Produits Pétroliers =

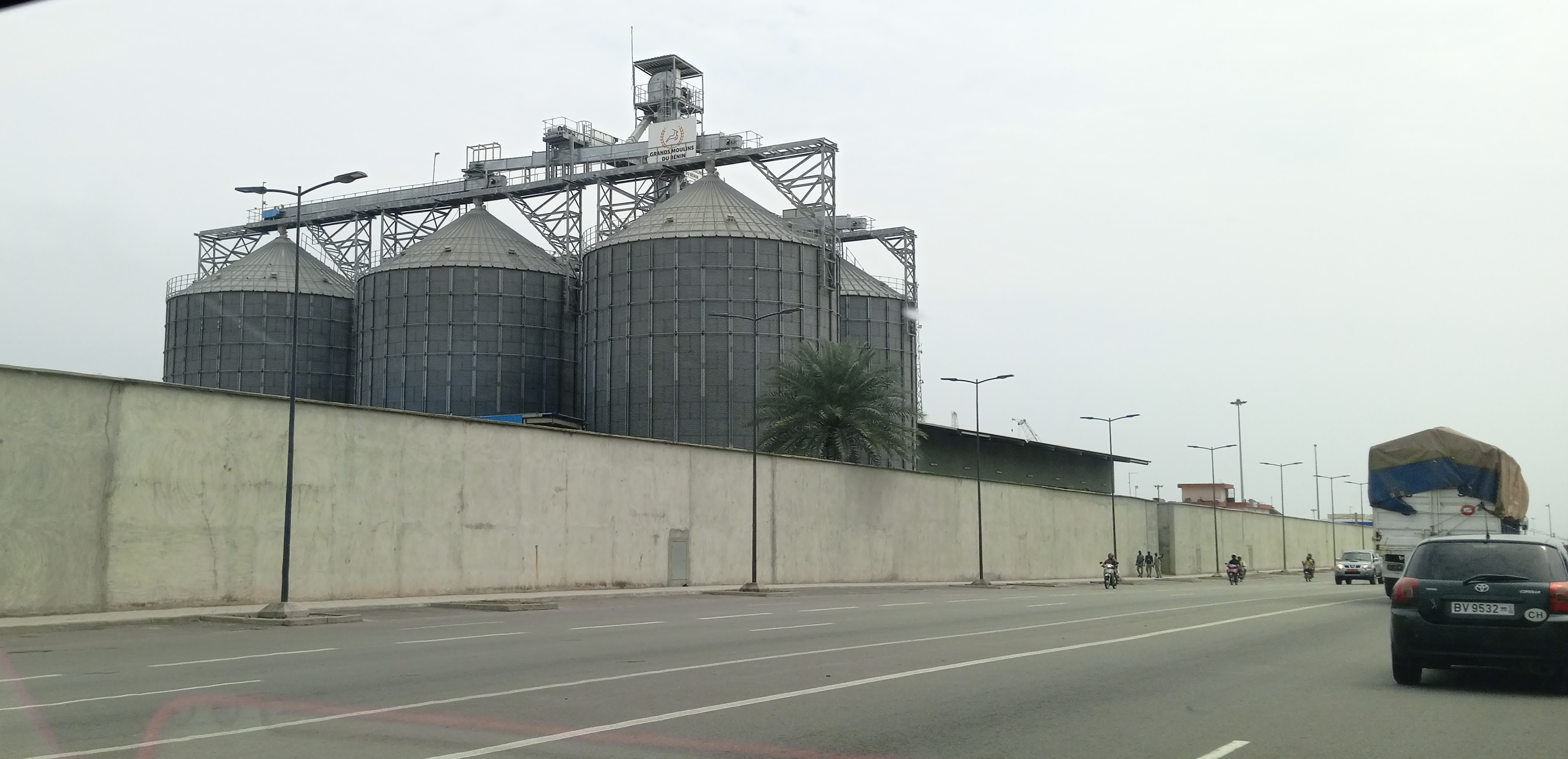
Former Sonacop oil tanks in Benin

Société Nationale de Commercialisation des Produits Pétroliers (SONACOP) is a supplier of petroleum and gas products in Benin. The company was established on 4 December 1974 as a state owned enterprise after nationalization and merger of Beninese daughter companies of BP, Total S.A., Agip, Texaco, Shell, Mobil and DEPP. Since 1 July 1994 SONACOP is a joint stock company.
