= Banque Internationale du Bénin =

Former bank in Benin

The Banque Internationale du Bénin (B.I.B.E.) was a bank of Benin and a member of the West African Bankers' Association.

It had its headquarters at Carrefour des 3 Banques in Cotonou and branches in Porto-Novo and Parakou. Nigerian banks dominated its ownership structure, with the First Bank of Nigeria Plc. having a 13.6% share, the Union Bank of Nigeria Plc. (13%), Nigerian Economic Operatives (47.7%), Nigerian Bureau of Public Enterprises (6.7%), and then the First Interstate Merchant Bank Ltd. (11.1%) and finally the Beninese Economic Operatives with 8.2%.

In 2020, the BIBE was merged with Banque Africaine pour l'Industrie et le Commerce (BAIC) to form a new entity under government ownership, the Banque Internationale pour l'Industrie et le Commerce (BIIC).

== See also ==
- List of banks in Benin
