= Compagnie Béninoise de Négoce et de Distribution =

Retail and trading company based in Benin

The Compagnie Béninoise de Négoce et de Distribution, known as CBND, is a retail and trading company based in Benin.

== Operations ==
CBND can be described as two companies, Innovation SA and STND, both of which are active in the distribution of famous brand name goods in Africa. Printed textiles are an important part of the group's activity and CBND has marketed textiles in Benin in affiliation with the CFAO Groupe.

A representative list of the group's sectors and brand names:

- Textiles : Wax Hollandais, Wax UK, Fancy Prints
- Tobacco products : Fine, Gauloises, Viking, Gitanes
- Health :Colgate-Palmolive.
- Miscellaneous : Société Bic, Campingaz
- Alcoholic beverages : VitaMalt, Johnnie Walker, Martini & Rossi, Moët & Chandon, Champagne Mercier, etc.
- Foods : Knorr, De Rica, Laits Candia & Golden Royal, Café JAG
- Retail markets : la Maison du Vin, Cash Supermarché.

Related organizations CBND is affiliated with the following manufacturers:

- Société Française de Commerce Extérieur (SFCE Groupe CFAO)
- Colgate Palmolive France, Côte d'Ivoire et Sénégal.
- Groupe Altadis (European Tobacco Company)
- NETTER
- VLISCO
- TEXICODI
- MBR

CBND's banking partners:

- Ecobank
- Financial Group
- Continental Bank - Benin
- Bank of Africa - Benin
