= Electronic cargo tracking note =

African Cargo Tracking Note

The Electronic Cargo Tracking Note (ECTN) is a maritime certificate or waiver that is essential for exports to the majority of African countries. It acts as a vital document for both importers and exporters within Africa, necessitating its presentation to customs officials. Typically, the ECTN must be validated at least 5 days before the vessel's scheduled port arrival. Failure to provide this document, or presenting an incorrect version, could lead to significant fines and prevent cargo from being cleared through customs.

African countries require the ECTN from shippers to ensure effective oversight, supervision, and management of import/export traffic. It facilitates advance knowledge of cargo specifics prior to its arrival at the destination port, thereby enhancing security measures.

Depending on the country, the ECTN may be known by different names, including:

- BESC (Bordereau Électronique de Suivi de Cargaison)
- BSC (Bordereau de Suivi de Cargaison)
- FERI (Fiche Électronique des Renseignements à l'Importation)
- ACID (Advance Cargo Information Declaration)
- CNCA (Conselho Nacional de Carregadores)

== Description ==
The ECTN provides a comprehensive framework for customs and border officials to exert full control over shipments. This standardized certificate contains detailed information about the exporter, importer, method of shipping, value of goods, name of the vessel, and freight cost.

== History ==
The ECTN was introduced to bolster protection for African nations and to create an additional revenue stream. Angola mandated the use of the ECTN in 1994, setting a precedent that over 24 countries, including Egypt (which introduced the ACID in April 2021), have since followed.

== Roles and purposes ==
By supplying crucial data on the flow of shipments, the ECTN enables customs officials to better manage port operations. It aids in the efficient allocation of stevedoring personnel and unloading equipment, thereby enhancing cargo handling. Additionally, the ECTN combats the under-declaration of goods, improving both financial security and the accuracy of goods valuation.

== Responsibilities ==
It is the responsibility of shippers, their agents, or freight forwarders to obtain the ECTN from authorized entities in the country of origin. Non-compliance attracts penalties. While shippers bear the primary responsibility, importers, shipping lines, and other involved parties also play significant roles. Shipping lines, in particular, are tasked with informing exporters about the ECTN requirement before issuing the Original Bill of Lading.

== Possible consequences of non-compliance ==
Failing to adhere to ECTN regulations can obstruct cargo clearance, incur daily demurrage/storage charges, manifest amendment fees, and fines up to five times the value of the goods. In extreme cases, such as a 2017 incident in Gabon where a €40,000 fine was levied, exporters might choose to abandon shipments altogether.

== Necessary documents ==
While required documents can vary, they generally include:

- Bill of Lading
- Commercial invoice
- Freight invoice (if not included in the commercial invoice)

Certain countries may also require additional documentation, such as the Documento Único (DU), Certificate of Insurance, Packing List, Certificate of Origin, and Customs declaration.

== List of countries requiring ECTN ==
The implementation of the ECTN is widespread across numerous African countries, demonstrating its critical role in shipment tracking and control. These countries include:

- Angola
- Benin
- Burkina Faso
- Burundi
- Cameroon
- Central African Republic
- Chad
- D.R. Congo
- Djibouti
- Egypt
- Equatorial Guinea
- Gabon
- Ghana
- Guinea Bissau
- Guinea Conakry
- Ivory Coast
- Liberia
- Libya
- Madagascar
- Mali
- Niger
- Republic of Congo
- Senegal
- Sierra Leone
- South Sudan
- Somalia
- Togo

== Technical implementation ==
Except for Angola, which still requires a physical copy, the application process for the ECTN is now completely online across all mandated countries. This digital approach simplifies the application process, making it more efficient and user-friendly.

== Different names by country ==
The ECTN is known under various denominations depending on the country, illustrating the localized adaptation of this essential trade document. These include:

- ACID (Advance Cargo Information Declaration) - Egypt
- BESC (Bordereau Électronique de Suivi de Cargaisonis) - Benin, Cameroon
- BIETC (Bordereau d'Identification Electronique de Traçabilité des Cargaisons) - Gabon
- BSC (Bordereau de Suivi de Cargaisonis) - Ivory Coast, Madagascar, Mali, Niger, Senegal
- CEE (Certificado Electrónico de Embarque) - Guinea Bissau
- CNCA (Conselho Nacional de Carregadores) - Angola
- CTN (Cargo Tracking Note) - Ghana, Liberia
- ECTN (Electronic Cargo Tracking Note) - Algeria, Burkina Faso, Burundi, Central African Republic, Equatorial Guinea, Guinea Conakry, Libya, Republic of Chad, Republic of Congo, South Sudan, Togo
- ENS - Sierra Leone
- FERI (Fiche Électronique des Renseignements à l'Importation) - Democratic Republic of Congo
