= Cadjehoun Airport =

International airport serving Cotonou, Benin

Cardinal Bernadin Gantin International Airport Cotonou Cadjehoun Airport
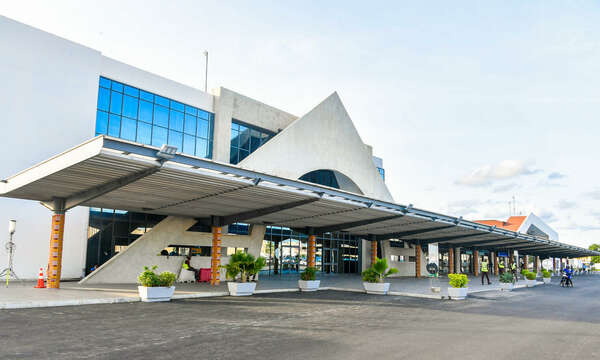
- IATA: COO; ICAO: DBBB

Summary
- Serves: Cotonou and Porto-Novo, Benin
- Hub for: Rwandair, Benin Airlines
- Elevation AMSL: 6 m (20 ft)
- Coordinates: 6°21′21″N 2°23′06″E
- Website: aeroport-de-cotonou.bj

Map
- Location of Airport in Benin

Runways
Direction	Length		Surface
Direction	m	ft	Surface
06/24	2,400	7,874	Asphalt
- Sources: GCM ACI's 2014 World Airport Traffic Report.

Cardinal Bernadin Gantin International Airport (formerly known as Cotonou Cadjehoun Airport) (IATA: COO, ICAO: DBBB) is an airport in the Cadjehoun neighborhood of Cotonou, the largest city in Benin, a West African country. The airport is the largest in the country, and the primary entry point into the country by air, with flights to Africa and Europe.

The airport was renamed after cardinal Bernardin Gantin in 2021.

== Airlines and destinations ==
=== Passenger ===
Airlines	Destinations
Air Côte d'Ivoire	Abidjan
Air Peace	Lagos
ASKY Airlines	Lomé
Air France	Paris–Charles de Gaulle
Brussels Airlines	Brussels
Camair-Co	Libreville
Corsair International	Paris–Orly
Ethiopian Airlines	Addis Ababa
Royal Air Maroc	Casablanca
RwandAir	Abidjan, Bamako, Conakry, Dakar–Diass, Douala

== Statistics ==
Traffic by calendar year. Official ACI Statistics
	Passengers	Change from previous year	Aircraft operations	Change from previous year	Cargo (metric tons)	Change from previous year
2007	401,073	▲20.79%	9,274	▲13.96%	5,772	▲36.94%
2008	394,444	▼1.65%	9,915	▲6.91%	10,091	▲74.83%
2009	391,318	▼0.79%	10,209	▲2.97%	8,081	▼19.92%
2010	406,491	▲3.88%	11,604	▲13.66%	6,047	▼25.17%
2011	432,500	▲6.40%	N.D.	N.D.	6,829	▲12.93%
2012	481,389	▲11.30%	N.D.	N.D.	6,959	▲1.90%
2013	470,068	▼2.35%	11,876	N.D.	6,506	▼6.51%
2014	503,633	▲7.14%	11,855	▼0.18%	7,995	▲22.89%

== Replacement ==
In 1974, it was decided to move the operations of the Cotonou international airport to a new facility in Glo-Djigbé. Lack of funding quickly stopped the project.

The plans were revived in 2011, and President Yayi Boni presided at a ceremonial start to the construction of the new airport, using South African funding. Construction on the new facility appears to have stalled again.

Meanwhile, improvements to the Cotonou airport were initiated.
