= List of elections in 1998 =

The following elections occurred in the year 1998.

== Africa ==
- 1998 Burkinabé presidential election
- 1998 Central African parliamentary election
- 1998 Gabonese presidential election
- 1998 Guinean presidential election
- 1998 Lesotho general election
- 1998 Malagasy parliamentary election
- 1998 Malagasy constitutional referendum
- 1998 Namibian local and regional elections
- 1998 Nigerian parliamentary election
- 1998 Senegalese parliamentary election
- 1998 Seychellois general election
- 1998 Swazi general election
- 1998 São Toméan legislative election
- 1998 Sudanese constitutional referendum
- 1998 Togolese presidential election

== Asia ==
- 1998 Abkhazian local elections
- 1998 Armenian presidential election
- 1998 Azerbaijani presidential election
- 1998 Cambodian general election
- 1998 Cypriot presidential election
- 1998 Georgian local elections
- 1998 Hong Kong legislative election
- 1998 Indian general election
- 1998 Indonesian presidential election
- 1998 Israeli municipal elections
- 1998 Israeli presidential election
- 1998 Kyrgyz constitutional referendum
- 1998 Lebanese presidential election
- 1998 Macedonian parliamentary election
- 1998 Maldivian presidential election
- 1998 North Korean parliamentary election
- 1998 Philippine House of Representatives elections
- 1998 Philippine Senate election
- 1998 Philippine general election
- 1998 Philippine presidential election
- 1998 Republic of China legislative election
- 1997–98 Republic of China local elections
- 1998 South Korean local elections
- 1998 Sri Lankan local government elections
- 1998 Syrian parliamentary election

=== India ===
- 1998 Indian general election
- Indian general election in Andhra Pradesh, 1998
- Indian general election in Haryana, 1998
- Indian general election in National Capital Territory of Delhi, 1998
- Indian general election in Tamil Nadu, 1998
- State Assembly elections in India, 1998

=== Japan ===
- 1998 Japanese House of Councillors election

== Australia ==
- 1998 Australian Capital Territory election
- 1998 Australian federal election
- 1998 Mulgrave state by-election
- 1998 Northern Territory referendum
- 1998 Queensland state election
- 1998 Tasmanian state election

== Europe ==
- 1998 Albanian constitutional referendum
- 1998 Armenian presidential election
- 1998 Azerbaijani presidential election
- 1998 Basque regional election
- 1998 Bosnian general election
- 1998 Czech legislative election
- 1998 Czech Senate election
- 1998 Czech municipal elections
- 1998 Czech presidential election
- 1998 Danish parliamentary election
- 1998 Dutch general election
- 1998 Faroese general election
- 1998 Hungarian parliamentary election
- 1998 Irish constitutional referendums
- 1998 Kyrgyz constitutional referendum
- 1998 Latvian parliamentary election
- 1997–1998 Lithuanian presidential election
- 1998 Macedonian parliamentary election
- 1998 Maltese general election
- 1998 Monegasque general election
- 1998 Montenegrin local elections
- 1998 Montenegrin parliamentary election
- 1998 Northern Cypriot parliamentary election
- 1998 Polish local elections
- 1998 Portuguese abortion referendum
- 1998 Portuguese regionalisation referendum
- 1998 San Marino general election
- 1998 San Marino local elections
- 1998 Slovak parliamentary election
- 1998 Slovak presidential election
- 1998 Stockholm municipal election
- 1998 Swedish general election
- 1998 Swiss referendums
- 1998 Ukrainian parliamentary election

=== Austria ===
- 1998 Austrian presidential election

=== France ===
- 1998 Alsace regional election
- 1998 Brittany regional election
- 1998 French cantonal elections
- 1998 French regional elections
- 1998 Rhône-Alpes regional election

=== Germany ===
- 1998 Bavarian state election
- 1998 German federal election
- 1998 Lower Saxony state election

=== Moldova ===
- 1998 Moldovan parliamentary election

=== United Kingdom ===
- 1998 United Kingdom local elections
- 1998 Northern Ireland Assembly election
- 1998 Northern Ireland Good Friday Agreement referendum

==== United Kingdom local ====
- 1998 United Kingdom local elections

===== English local =====
- 1998 Adur Council election
- 1998 Amber Valley Council election
- 1998 Barking and Dagenham Council election
- 1998 Barnet Council election
- 1998 Barnsley Council election
- 1998 Barrow-in-Furness Council election
- 1998 Bedford Council election
- 1998 Bexley Council election
- 1998 Birmingham City Council election
- 1998 Bradford Council election
- 1998 Brent Council election
- 1998 Brentwood Council election
- 1998 Bromley Council election
- 1998 Burnley Council election
- 1998 Bury Council election
- 1998 Calderdale Council election
- 1998 Camden Council election
- 1998 Cheltenham Council election
- 1998 Cherwell Council election
- 1998 Chorley Council election
- 1998 Coventry Council election
- 1998 Craven Council election
- 1998 Croydon Council election
- 1998 Daventry Council election
- 1998 Derby Council election
- 1998 Doncaster Council election
- 1998 Dudley Council election
- 1998 Eastleigh Council election
- 1998 Ellesmere Port and Neston Council election
- 1998 Enfield Council election
- 1998 Epping Forest Council election
- 1998 Fareham Council election
- 1998 Gateshead Council election
- 1998 Gosport Council election
- 1998 Greenwich Council election
- 1998 Harlow Council election
- 1998 Hart Council election
- 1998 Hartlepool Council election
- 1998 Hastings Council election
- 1998 Hounslow Council election
- 1998 Hull Council election
- 1998 Hyndburn Council election
- 1998 Ipswich Borough Council election
- 1998 Kingston upon Thames Council election
- 1998 Kirklees Council election
- 1998 Knowsley Council election
- 1998 Lambeth Council election
- 1998 Leeds Council election
- 1998 Lewisham Council election
- 1998 City of Lincoln Council election
- 1998 Liverpool Council election
- 1998 Manchester Council election
- 1998 Merton Council election
- 1998 Mole Valley Council election
- 1998 Newcastle City Council election
- 1998 Newcastle-under-Lyme Council election
- 1998 Newham Council election
- 1998 North Tyneside Council election
- 1998 Oldham Council election
- 1998 Oxford City Council election
- 1998 Penwith Council election
- 1998 Portsmouth Council election
- 1998 Preston Council election
- 1998 Purbeck Council election
- 1998 Redditch Council election
- 1998 Reigate and Banstead Council election
- 1998 Richmond upon Thames Council election
- 1998 Rochdale Council election
- 1998 Rochford Council election
- 1998 Rossendale Council election
- 1998 Rotherham Council election
- 1998 Rugby Council election
- 1998 Runnymede Council election
- 1998 Rushmoor Council election
- 1998 Salford Council election
- 1998 Sandwell Council election
- 1998 Sefton Council election
- 1998 Sheffield Council election
- 1998 Solihull Council election
- 1998 South Lakeland Council election
- 1998 South Tyneside Council election
- 1998 Southampton Council election
- 1998 Southwark Council election
- 1998 St Albans City and District Council election
- 1998 St Helens Council election
- 1998 Stevenage Council election
- 1998 Stockport Council election
- 1998 Stratford-on-Avon Council election
- 1998 Sunderland Council election
- 1998 Swindon Council election
- 1998 Tameside Council election
- 1998 Tamworth Council election
- 1998 Tandridge Council election
- 1998 Three Rivers Council election
- 1998 Tower Hamlets Council election
- 1998 Trafford Council election
- 1998 Tunbridge Wells Council election
- 1998 Wakefield Council election
- 1998 Walsall Council election
- 1998 Waltham Forest Council election
- 1998 Wandsworth Council election
- 1998 Watford Council election
- 1998 Waveney Council election
- 1998 Welwyn Hatfield Council election
- 1998 West Lancashire Council election
- 1998 West Lindsey Council election
- 1998 Weymouth and Portland Council election
- 1998 Wigan Council election
- 1998 Winchester Council election
- 1998 Wirral Council election
- 1998 Woking Council election
- 1998 Wolverhampton Council election
- 1998 Worcester Council election
- 1998 Worthing Council election
- 1998 Wyre Forest Council election

== Japan ==
- 1998 Japanese House of Councillors election

== North America ==
- 1998 Belizean general election
- 1998 Costa Rican general election

=== Canada ===
- 1998 Alberta Senate nominee election
- 1998 Edmonton municipal election
- 1998 Manitoba municipal elections
- 1998 Montreal municipal election
- 1998 Nova Scotia general election
- 1998 Quebec general election
- 1998 Quebec municipal elections
- 1998 Winnipeg municipal election

=== United States ===
- 1998 United States elections
- Vote-by-mail in Oregon

==== United States gubernatorial ====
- 1998 Alabama gubernatorial election
- 1998 Alaska gubernatorial election
- 1998 Arizona gubernatorial election
- 1998 California gubernatorial election
- 1998 Colorado gubernatorial election
- 1998 Connecticut gubernatorial election
- 1998 Idaho gubernatorial election
- 1998 Illinois gubernatorial election
- 1998 Maine gubernatorial election
- 1998 Michigan gubernatorial election
- 1998 New Mexico gubernatorial election
- 1998 New York gubernatorial election
- 1998 Oregon gubernatorial election
- 1998 Pennsylvania gubernatorial election
- 1998 United States gubernatorial elections
- 1998 Vermont gubernatorial election

==== United States lieutenant gubernatorial ====
- 1998 Alabama lieutenant gubernatorial election
- 1998 Arkansas lieutenant gubernatorial election
- 1998 California lieutenant gubernatorial election
- 1998 Georgia lieutenant gubernatorial election
- 1998 Oklahoma lieutenant gubernatorial election
- 1998 Pennsylvania lieutenant gubernatorial election
- 1998 Texas lieutenant gubernatorial election

==== United States mayoral ====
- 1998 Auburn, Alabama municipal election
- 1998 Irvine mayoral election
- 1998 Long Beach, California, mayoral election
- 1998 Louisville mayoral election
- 1998 Newark mayoral election
- 1998 New Orleans mayoral election
- 1998 Oakland mayoral election
- 1998 Providence, Rhode Island mayoral election
- 1998 San Jose mayoral election
- 1998 Shreveport mayoral election
- 1998 Sioux Falls mayoral election
- 1998 Washington, D.C., mayoral election

==== Alabama ====
- 1998 Alabama gubernatorial election
- United States Senate election in Alabama, 1998

==== Alaska ====
- 1998 Alaska gubernatorial election
- United States Senate election in Alaska, 1998

==== Arizona ====
- 1998 Arizona gubernatorial election
- United States Senate election in Arizona, 1998

==== California ====
- 1998 California State Assembly election
- 1998 California Attorney General election
- 1998 California Insurance Commissioner election
- 1998 California Secretary of State election
- 1998 California State Controller election
- 1998 California elections
- 1998 California State Treasurer election
- 1998 California Superintendent of Public Instruction election
- 1998 California gubernatorial election
- 1998 California lieutenant gubernatorial election
- 1998 California Courts of Appeal election
- 1998 San Francisco Board of Supervisors election
- 1998 California State Senate election

===== California congressional =====
- 1998 United States Senate election in California
- 1998 United States House of Representatives elections in California

==== Colorado ====
- 1998 Colorado gubernatorial election
- United States Senate election in Colorado, 1998

==== Georgia (U.S. state) ====
- 1998 Georgia gubernatorial election
- United States House of Representatives elections in Georgia, 1998

==== Hawaii ====
- 1998 Hawaii gubernatorial election
- United States Senate election in Hawaii, 1998

==== Idaho ====
- 1998 Idaho gubernatorial election
- United States Senate election in Idaho, 1998

==== Illinois ====
- 1998 Illinois gubernatorial election
- United States Senate election in Illinois, 1998

==== Iowa ====
- 1998 Iowa gubernatorial election
- United States Senate election in Iowa, 1998

==== Kansas ====
- 1998 Kansas gubernatorial election
- United States Senate election in Kansas, 1998

==== Louisiana ====
- 1998 New Orleans mayoral election
- United States Senate election in Louisiana, 1998

==== Maine ====
- 1998 Maine gubernatorial election

==== Maryland ====
- United States Senate election in Maryland, 1998

==== Massachusetts ====
- 1998 Massachusetts general election
- 1998 Massachusetts gubernatorial election

==== Michigan ====
- 1998 Michigan gubernatorial election

==== Minnesota ====
- 1998 Minnesota gubernatorial election

==== New Hampshire ====
- United States Senate election in New Hampshire, 1998

==== New Mexico ====
- 1998 New Mexico gubernatorial election

==== North Carolina ====
- 1998 North Carolina judicial election
- 1998 United States House of Representatives elections in North Carolina
- 1998 United States Senate election in North Carolina

==== North Dakota ====
- United States Senate election in North Dakota, 1998

==== Ohio ====
- 1998 Ohio gubernatorial election
- United States Senate election in Ohio, 1998

==== Oklahoma ====
- 1998 Oklahoma state elections
- 1998 Oklahoma gubernatorial election
- United States Senate election in Oklahoma, 1998

==== Oregon ====
- Oregon Ballot Measure 58 (1998)
- 1998 Oregon gubernatorial election
- United States Senate election in Oregon, 1998

==== Pennsylvania ====
- 1998 Pennsylvania gubernatorial election
- United States Senate election in Pennsylvania, 1998

==== Rhode Island ====
- 1998 Rhode Island gubernatorial election

==== South Carolina ====
- 1998 South Carolina gubernatorial election
- United States House of Representatives elections in South Carolina, 1998

==== South Dakota ====
- United States Senate election in South Dakota, 1998

==== Texas ====
- 1998 Texas gubernatorial election

==== United States House of Representatives ====
- United States House of Representatives elections in Georgia, 1998
- United States House of Representatives elections in North Carolina, 1998
- United States House of Representatives elections in South Carolina, 1998
- United States House of Representatives elections in California, 1998
- 1998 United States House of Representatives elections

==== United States Senate ====
- 1998 United States Senate elections
- United States Senate election in Alabama, 1998
- United States Senate election in Alaska, 1998
- United States Senate election in Arizona, 1998
- United States Senate election in Arkansas, 1998
- United States Senate election in California, 1998
- United States Senate election in Colorado, 1998
- United States Senate election in Connecticut, 1998
- United States Senate election in Florida, 1998
- United States Senate election in Georgia, 1998
- United States Senate election in Idaho, 1998
- United States Senate election in Indiana, 1998
- United States Senate election in Iowa, 1998
- United States Senate election in Kansas, 1998
- United States Senate election in Kentucky, 1998
- United States Senate election in Louisiana, 1998
- United States Senate election in Maryland, 1998
- 1998 United States Senate election in Missouri
- United States Senate election in Nevada, 1998
- United States Senate election in New Hampshire, 1998
- United States Senate election in New York, 1998
- United States Senate election in North Carolina, 1998
- United States Senate election in North Dakota, 1998
- United States Senate election in Ohio, 1998
- United States Senate election in Oklahoma, 1998
- United States Senate election in Oregon, 1998
- United States Senate election in Pennsylvania, 1998
- United States Senate election in South Carolina, 1998
- United States Senate election in South Dakota, 1998
- United States Senate election in Illinois, 1998
- United States Senate election in Utah, 1998
- United States Senate election in Vermont, 1998
- United States Senate election in Washington, 1998
- United States Senate election in Wisconsin, 1998

==== Washington (U.S. state) ====
- United States Senate election in Washington, 1998

==== Washington, D.C. ====
- 1998 Washington, D.C. mayoral election

== Oceania ==
- 1998 Kiribati parliamentary election
- 1998 Kiribati presidential election
- 1998 Taranaki-King Country by-election
- 1998 Tuvaluan general election
- 1998 Vanuatuan general election

=== Australia ===
- 1998 Australian Capital Territory election
- 1998 Australian federal election
- 1998 Mulgrave state by-election
- 1998 Northern Territory referendum
- 1998 Queensland state election
- 1998 Tasmanian state election

=== Hawaii ===
- 1998 Hawaii gubernatorial election
- United States Senate election in Hawaii, 1998

=== New Zealand ===
- 1998 Taranaki-King Country by-election

== South America ==
- 1998 Brazilian general election
- 1998 Colombian parliamentary election
- 1998 Colombian presidential election
- 1998 Ecuadorian general election
- 1998 Venezuelan parliamentary election
- 1998 Venezuelan presidential election
- 1998 Paraguayan general election
