= List of elections in 1989 =

The following elections occurred in the year 1989.

== Africa ==
- 1989 Beninese parliamentary election
- 1989 Botswana general election
- 1989 Equatorial Guinean presidential election
- 1989 People's Republic of the Congo parliamentary election
- 1989 Guinea-Bissau legislative election
- 1989 Malagasy parliamentary election
- 1989 Malagasy presidential election
- 1989 Namibian parliamentary election
- 1989 Nigerien general election
- 1989 Seychellois presidential election
- 1989 South African general election
  - 1989 Gazankulu legislative election
- 1989 South African presidential election
- 1989 Tunisian general election
- 1989 Ugandan general election

== Asia ==
- 1989 Iranian supreme leader election
- 1989 Iranian presidential election
- 1989 Iranian constitutional referendum
- 1989 Iraqi parliamentary election
- 1989 Israeli municipal elections
- 1989 Japanese House of Councillors election
- 1989 Jordanian general election
- 1989 Laotian parliamentary election
- 5 November 1989 Lebanese presidential election
- 24 November 1989 Lebanese presidential election
- 1989 Maldivian parliamentary election
- 1989 North Korean local elections
- 1989 Philippine barangay election
- 1989 Singaporean presidential election
- 1989 Soviet Union legislative election
- 1989 Sri Lankan parliamentary election
- 1989 Taiwanese legislative election
- Turkey:
  - 1989 Turkish local elections
  - 1989 Turkish presidential election

=== India ===
- 1989 Indian general election
- Indian general election in Andhra Pradesh, 1989
- Indian general election in Tamil Nadu, 1989
- 1989 Tamil Nadu legislative assembly election

== Europe ==
- 1989 Andorran parliamentary election
- 1989 Belgian regional elections
- 1989 Czechoslovak presidential election
- 1989 Danish local elections
- Dutch general election
- Greek legislative election
- November 1989 Greek legislative election
- 1989 Irish general election
- 1989 Liechtenstein general election
- 1989 Luxembourg general election
- 1989 Norwegian parliamentary election
- 1989 Polish legislative election
- 1989 Polish presidential election
- 1989 Portuguese local election
- 1989 Soviet Union legislative election
- 1989 Spanish general election
- 1989 Turkish local elections
- 1989 Turkish presidential election
- 1989 West German presidential election

=== European Parliament ===
- European Parliament election, June 1989
- 1989 European Parliament election in Belgium
- 1989 European Parliament election in Denmark
- 1989 European Parliament election in Portugal
- 1989 European Parliament election in Sardinia
- 1989 European Parliament election in the United Kingdom
- 1989 European Parliament election in France
- 1989 European Parliament election in Greece
- 1989 European Parliament election in Ireland
- 1989 European Parliament election in Italy
- 1989 European Parliament election in Luxembourg
- 1989 European Parliament election in the Netherlands
- 1989 European Parliament election in Spain
- 1989 European Parliament election in West Germany
- 1989 European Parliament election in France
- 1989 European Parliament election in West Germany
- 1989 European Parliament election in Italy
- 1989 European Parliament election in Spain

=== France ===
- 1989 French municipal elections

=== Italy ===
- 1989 European Parliament election in Sardinia

=== Serbia ===
- 1989 Serbian general election

== Americas ==
=== North America ===
- 1989 Aruban general election
- 1989–1991 Belizean municipal elections
- 1989 Belizean legislative election
- 1989 Honduran general election
- 1989 Panamanian general election
- 1989 Salvadoran presidential election

==== Canada ====
- 1989 Alberta Senate nominee election
- 1989 Alberta general election
- 1989 Beaver River federal by-election
- 1989 Edmonton municipal election
- 1989 Manitoba municipal elections
- 1989 New Democratic Party leadership election
- 1989 Newfoundland general election
- 1989 Prince Edward Island general election
- 1989 Progressive Conservative Party of New Brunswick leadership election
- 1989 Quebec general election
- 1989 Winnipeg municipal election
- 1989 Yukon general election

==== United States ====
- 1989 United States elections

===== United States lieutenant gubernatorial =====
- 1989 Virginia lieutenant gubernatorial election

===== United States gubernatorial =====
- 1989 New Jersey gubernatorial election
- 1989 United States gubernatorial elections
- 1989 Virginia gubernatorial election

===== United States House of Representatives =====
- 1989 United States House of Representatives elections
- 1989 California's 15th congressional district special election
- 1989 Indiana's 4th congressional district special election
- 1989 Texas's 12th congressional district special election
- 1989 Texas's 18th congressional district special election
- 1989 Wyoming's at-large congressional district special election

===== United States mayoral elections =====
- 1989 Allentown mayoral election
- 1989 Atlanta mayoral election
- 1989 Buffalo mayoral election
- 1989 Burlington, Vermont mayoral election
- 1989 Chicago mayoral special election
- 1989 Cleveland mayoral election
- 1989 Houston mayoral election
- 1989 Los Angeles mayoral election
- 1989 Madison mayoral election
- 1989 Manchester, New Hampshire, mayoral election
- 1989 New York City mayoral election
- 1989 Pittsburgh mayoral election
- 1989 Springfield, Massachusetts mayoral election
- 1989 Springfield, Massachusetts mayoral special election
- 1989 St. Louis mayoral election
- 1989 Toledo, Ohio mayoral election
- 1989 Worcester, Massachusetts mayoral election

=== Caribbean ===
- 1989 Antigua and Barbuda general election
- 1989 Bermudian general election
- 1989 Jamaican general election
- 1989 Saint Kitts and Nevis general election
- 1989 Vincentian general election

=== South America ===
- 1989 Argentine general election
- 1989 Bolivian presidential election
- 1989 Brazilian presidential election
- 1989 Chilean political reform referendum
- 1989 Chilean presidential election
- 1989 Falkland Islands general election
- 1989 Paraguayan general election
- 1989 Uruguayan general election

== Oceania ==
- 1989 Cook Islands general election
- 1989 Micronesian general election
- 1989 Nauruan parliamentary election
- 1989 New Zealand local elections
- 1989 Solomon Islands general election
- 1989 Tuvaluan general election

=== Australia ===
- 1989 Australian Capital Territory election
- 1989 Greensborough state by-election
- 1989 Gwydir by-election
- 1989 Liverpool state by-election
- 1989 Merthyr state by-election
- 1989 Queensland state election
- 1989 Rodney state by-election
- 1989 South Australian state election
- 1989 Tasmanian state election
- 1989 Western Australian state election
