= Paul Kpoffon =

Paul Kpoffon-Totin was a Beninese trade unionist, politician and diplomat. He was a leader of postal and telegraph workers, and became a minister and ambassador during the People's Revolutionary Party of Benin era.

== Trade unionist ==
In the 1960s, he worked as controller for Post and Telecommunications in Dahomey (today Benin). At the same time he was active in trade unionism, representing the Inter-Union Committee. In the 1970s he served as general secretary of the Syndicat national des câbles, postes et télécommunications ('National Union of Cables, Posts and Telecommunications').

In 1975 he was elected second substitute member for Africa in the executive of the Postal, Telegraph and Telephone Workers' International at its world congress, having been selected for the post at their African regional conference the preceding year.

== Political career ==
Kpoffon was included in the Central Committee of the People's Revolutionary Party of Benin. He served as prefect of the Zou Department between 20 February 1977 and 20 February 1980. In 1979 he was sent as an envoy of president Mathieu Kérékou to the VI summit of the Non-Aligned Movement in Cuba, where he met with Fidel Castro. As of 1980–1981 he served as Minister of Public Health. He led the Beninese delegations at the 33rd World Health Assembly held in 1980 and the 34th assembly held in 1981.

== Diplomat ==
In 1983 Kpoffon became the Ambassador Extraordinary and Plenipotentiary of the People's Republic of Benin to Romania. On 5 March 1984 Kpoffon presented his credentials as Ambassador to Hungary.

Kpoffon was removed from his post as ambassador in 1985, and later he was dropped from the party Central Committee at the second congress of the People's Revolutionary Party of Benin held in November 1985.
