= National League of Patriotic Youth =

The National League of Patriotic Youth (French: Ligue nationale de la jeunesse patriotique, L.N.J.P.) was a political movement in Dahomey (later renamed Benin). The organization was founded in 1967. Its followers were nicknamed ligueurs.

The League aligned itself with the military rulers of the country. The organization succeeded in convincing the military to adopt a Marxist–Leninist political discourse, in the aftermath of the 1972 coup d'état (led by Mathieu Kérékou). During the existence of the People's Republic of Benin, ruled by the People's Revolutionary Party of Benin (PRPB), the erstwhile ligueurs represented the hardline radical factions within the system. The group was highly influential in the 1974–75 period.

The ligueur faction fell out of line with President Kérékou from 1981 onwards. Within the regime the influence of moderates and technocrats increased whilst the influence of the ligueurs was curtailed.
