= 1989 Beninese parliamentary election =

- 18 June 1989
- All 206 seats in the National Revolutionary Assembly; 104 seats needed for a majority
Party	Leader	Vote %	Seats	+/–
PRPB	Mathieu Kérékou	89.60	206	+10
This lists parties that won seats. See the complete results below.

Parliamentary elections were held in Benin on 18 June 1989. At the time, the country was a one-party state under the People's Revolutionary Party of Benin, with voters given the choice of approving the party's list of 206 candidates for the National Revolutionary Assembly (increased from 196 in the 1984 elections) or not. In the elections 90% of voters approved the list, with 9% voting against. Turnout was 86%.

Following the election, Mathieu Kérékou was re-elected President unopposed by the Assembly on 2 August.

== Results ==
Choice	Votes	%
Approve	1,695,860	89.60
Not approve	164,665	8.70
Abstain	32,176	1.70
Total	1,892,701	100.00
Registered voters/turnout	1,892,701	–
Source: Nohlen et al.
