= 1979 Beninese parliamentary election =

- 20 November 1979
- All 336 seats in the National Revolutionary Assembly; 169 seats needed for a majority
- Turnout: 80.58%
Party	Leader	Vote %	Seats	+/–
PRPB	Mathieu Kérékou	98.31	336	New
This lists parties that won seats. See the complete results below.

Elections for the National Revolutionary Assembly were held in Benin on 20 November 1979. At the time, the country was a one-party state under the People's Revolutionary Party of Benin, with voters given the choice of approving the party's list of 336 candidates or not. The list was approved by 98% of voters, with an 81% turnout. Following the election, Mathieu Kérékou was elected President (unopposed) by the Assembly on 6 February 1980.

== Results ==
Choice	Votes	%
Approve	1,248,613	98.31
Not approve	21,438	1.69
Total	1,270,051	100.00
Valid votes	1,270,051	99.58
Invalid/blank votes	5,410	0.42
Total votes	1,275,461	100.00
Registered voters/turnout	1,582,910	80.58
Source: Nohlen et al.

=== Assembly members ===
Rather than geographical constituencies, seats were divided up by professions.

Profession	Seats
Civil servants	105
Peasants and craftsmen	84
Party officials	67
Military	33
Workers	33
Representatives of the middle class	8
Clergy	6
