= 1984 Beninese parliamentary election =

- 10 June 1984
- All 196 seats in the National Revolutionary Assembly; 99 seats needed for a majority
- Turnout: 93.15%
Party	Leader	Vote %	Seats	+/–
PRPB	Mathieu Kérékou	98.15	196	−140
This lists parties that won seats. See the complete results below.

Elections for the National Revolutionary Assembly were held in Benin on 10 June 1984. They were originally scheduled for 1983, but the term of the Assembly was extended by 18 months. At the time, the country was a one-party state under the People's Revolutionary Party of Benin, with voters given the choice of approving the party's list of 196 candidates (reduced from 336) or not. The list was ultimately approved by 98% of voters, with a 93% turnout. Following the election, Mathieu Kérékou was elected President (unopposed) by the Assembly on 31 July.

== Results ==
Choice	Votes	%
Approve	1,811,808	98.15
Not approve	27,720	1.50
Abstain	6,397	0.35
Total	1,845,925	100.00
Valid votes	1,845,925	99.72
Invalid/blank votes	5,119	0.28
Total votes	1,851,044	100.00
Registered voters/turnout	1,987,173	93.15
Source: Nohlen et al.

== Assembly members ==
Rather than geographical constituencies, seats were given to 22 professions. The largest number of seats (78) were held by "Peasants and craftsmen from rural areas". Also represented were mass organizations, the party (31 seats), civil servants (divided into six categories), the army (divided into privates, non-commissioned officers and officers ), workers, religious bodies, students, retired people, magistrates and the "national bourgeoisie". Assembly members, known as "People's Commissioners", also had their terms extended from three to five years.
