= 1990 Micronesian Constitutional Convention election =

Constitutional Convention elections were held in the Federated States of Micronesia on 9 January 1990, following the approval of the election in a 1989 referendum. All candidates ran as independents.
