= 1998 Oklahoma lieutenant gubernatorial election =

- November 3, 1998
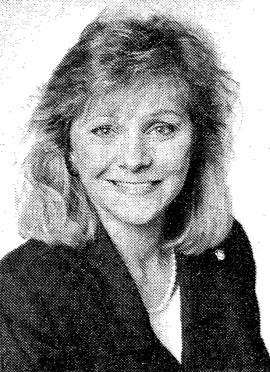

Nominee	Mary Fallin	Jack Morgan
Party	Republican	Democratic
Popular vote	585,712	281,379
Percentage	67.55%	32.45%
- County results Fallin: 50–60% 60–70% 70–80% 80–90% Morgan: 50–60%
Lieutenant Governor before election
Mary Fallin
Republican
Elected Lieutenant Governor
Mary Fallin
Republican

The 1998 Oklahoma lieutenant gubernatorial election was held on November 3, 1998, to elect the Lieutenant Governor of Oklahoma, concurrently with elections to the United States Senate, U.S. House of Representatives, governor, and other state and local elections. Primary elections were held on August 25, 1998, with runoff elections held on September 15 in races where no single candidate cleared at least 50% of the vote.

Incumbent Republican lieutenant governor Mary Fallin defeated Democratic candidate Jack Morgan in a landslide.

== Republican primary ==
=== Candidates ===
==== Nominee ====
- Mary Fallin, incumbent lieutenant governor (1995–present)

=== Results ===
Republican primary results
Party	Candidate	Votes	%
Republican	Mary Fallin (incumbent)	Unopposed	
Total votes		—N/a	100.0

== Democratic primary ==
=== Candidates ===
==== Nominee ====
- Jack Morgan, doctor and technician

==== Eliminated in primary ====
- Dan Lowe, rancher

=== Results ===
Democratic primary results
Party	Candidate	Votes	%
Democratic	Jack Morgan	145,705	55.48
Democratic	Dan Lowe	116,933	44.52
Total votes		262,638	100.0

== General election ==
=== Post-primary endorsements ===
Mary Fallin (R)

Newspapers and other media

- The Oklahoman

=== Results ===
1998 Oklahoma lieutenant gubernatorial election
Party	Candidate	Votes	%
Republican	Mary Fallin (incumbent)	585,712	67.55
Democratic	Jack Morgan	281,379	32.45
Total votes		867,091	100.0
Republican hold			
