= 1998 Rhône-Alpes regional election =

A regional election took place in Rhône-Alpes on March 15, 1998, along with all other regions.

In a controversial election, Charles Millon (UDF) was originally elected after accepting the votes of 35 FN councillors. However, his election was voided by the Constitutional Council, and Anne-Marie Comparini (UDF) won a new vote in January 1999 against a milloniste candidate.

Party	Votes	%	Seats
PS	399,204	21.71%	31
The Greens	64,299	3.50%	9
Miscellaneous Left	63,924	3.48%	7
PRS	57,502	3.13%	2
PCF	41,179	2.24%	12
Left	626,108	34.06%	61
UDF	411,283	22.36%	29
RPR	168,748	9.18%	29
Miscellaneous Right	71,082	3.87%	2
RPR-UDF	651,113	35.41%	60
FN	348,808	18.97%	35
Ecologists	81,201	4.42%	0
LCR-LO	77,996	4.25%	0
Others	47,614	2.59%	2
Far-right	6,616	0.36%	0
Total	1,839,456	100.00%	157
