= 1998 Lebanese presidential election =

← 1989	13 October 1998	2008 →
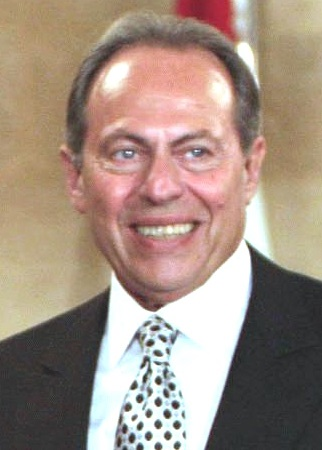
Nominee	Émile Lahoud
Party	Independent
Electoral vote	118
Percentage	92%
President before election
Elias Hrawi
Independent
Elected President
Émile Lahoud
Independent

An indirect presidential election was held in the Parliament of Lebanon on 13 October 1998, resulting in General Emile Lahoud being elected President of the Lebanese Republic.

By convention, the presidency is always attributed to a Maronite Christian. Under the article 49 of the Lebanese Constitution, a qualified majority of two-thirds of the members of the 128-seat Lebanese Parliament is required to elect the president. After the second round of election, the president is elected by an absolute majority.

General-in-chief of the army, Emile Lahoud, was backed by Syria and elected in a landslide 118 out of 118 votes (of the attending MPs) in the Chamber of Deputies.

118 of 128 deputies attended the session, thus reaching the required quorum of 2/3 of MPs needed to proceed. On the first round, every deputy voted for Emile Lahoud, thus immediately making him the 11th President of the Lebanese Republic.
