= 1998 Northern Territory referendum =

- 3 October 1998

Results
Choice	Votes	%
Yes	44,702	48.10%
No	48,241	51.90%
Valid votes	92,943	98.86%
Invalid or blank votes	1,068	1.14%
Total votes	94,011	100.00%

A referendum was held in the Northern Territory on Saturday, 3 October 1998, to decide whether the Territory should become a State of the Commonwealth of Australia. The Country Liberal Party government, and its federal counterpart, supported the Yes case. The opposition Labor Party objected to the process of the Darwin Statehood Convention and the referendum, but officially supported the "Yes" case. The ATSIC and the Aboriginal Land Councils campaigned for a "No" vote.

The referendum was narrowly defeated, 51.9% to 48.1%. The "Yes" case received 44,702 votes, the "No" case 48,241. There were 1,068 invalid ballots. The result was seen as a major defeat for the ruling Country Liberal Party and lead to a major electoral defeat. Despite the fact that support for statehood in polls remains high, there has been no attempt to propose a new statehood referendum.

== History ==
The territory has a legislative assembly. Whilst this assembly exercises roughly the same powers as the governments of the states of Australia, it does so by delegation of powers from the Commonwealth Government, rather than by any constitutional right. For several years before the referendum there had been agitation for full statehood so as to guarantee residents of the Northern Territory the same constitutional right to self government as other states. A 1995 poll found that 68% of the population of the territory was in favor of statehood.

A Statehood Convention met in Darwin in March and April 1998 to consider and report on important questions for the eventual statehood of the Northern Territory. It contained both delegates that were elected and delegates that were directly appointed by the sitting government. It finalised a draft Constitution that it then tabled to the legislature in April of the same year, and resolved that the draft should be put to a referendum.

However there was controversy regarding the Statehood Convention, both in how the delegates were selected and what was seen as a rush by the ruling party to time the referendum with national elections. Delegates representing the Aboriginal population withdrew from the conventions, and held their own convention in Kalkarigni in August 1998. The result of this convention was a statement that the convention did not consent to establishment of a new state under the terms of the draft constitution from the Darwin convention. The Kalkaringi Convention emphasised the need for appropriate consultation with Aboriginal communities and explicit provisions for their self determination.

Legal commentators noted that although the draft constitution had been accepted by the legislature, there were significant unresolved legal questions such as senate representation pursuant to section 121 of the Australian Constitution. Harry Gibbs argued that the draft Constitution adopted at the Statehood Convention in Darwin was incompatible with the Australia Act of 1986.

A group calling themselves the Territorians for a Democratic Statehood formed around concerns that the Statehood Convention had been rushed by the ruling government. Although they favoured statehood they campaigned for a "No" vote on the referendum, arguing for a statehood process driven by conventions with fully elected representatives.

== Referendum ==
In April 1998 the Darwin Convention presented their draft constitution to the state legislature, where it was accepted with only minor amendments. The ruling Country Liberal Party had set a goal for full statehood by January 2001, and in August of 1998 the national government in Canberra announced their support for this goal. The date for the referendum was set for October 3rd of 1998, concurrent with the general election for the commonwealth.

The text of the referendum question was as follows:

Now that a constitution for a State of the Northern Territory has been recommended by the Statehood Convention and endorsed by the Northern Territory Parliament: DO YOU AGREE that we should become a State?"

In the run up to the Referendum, both the Country Liberal Party and the opposition Labor Party officially supported a "Yes" vote, despite the Labor Party’s earlier opposition to the draft constitution. As the legislature unanimously voted in favor of the motion to propose the referendum, there was no official "No" case as provided by the Referendums Act of 1998. Although there was no official "No" case, the campaign against the referendum was backed by ATSIC, the Aboriginal Land Councils, Territorians for a Democratic Statehood, and smaller political parties.

== Results ==
The referendum was narrowly defeated, 51.9% to 48.1%. The "Yes" case received 44,702 votes, the "No" case 48,241. There were 1,068 invalid ballots. Urban areas voted slightly in favour of the referendum overall, but remote areas voted heavily against.

The failure of the referendum came as a surprise to political commentators, who had predicted a "Yes" vote based on strong polling in favour of statehood. The public interpretation attributed the failure of the resolution to the perception that the constitutional convention had been hastily organised to serve the ruling party, the coordinated opposition of Aboriginal advocacy groups, and confusion around the implementation details of statehood. Other commentators noted that the result could be an indication that although territorians are broadly in favour of statehood, they may not be particularly committed to that cause. According to this view the best explanation for the "No" vote is that organised opposition did a better job of mobilising their voters.

The failed referendum triggered a shakeup of the Northern Territory government. Shane Stone, who had personally campaigned in favour of the draft constitution, resigned in February 1999. The Country Liberal Party under Dennis Burke proceeded to lose 8 of their 18 seats in the 2001 Northern Territory general election, ending 20 years of continuous control of the legislature.

== See also ==
- States and territories of Australia
