= 1998 Alsace regional election =

A regional election took place in Alsace on March 15, 1998, along with all other regions.

Party	Votes	%	Seats
UDF	155,265	26.84%	9
RPR	37,672	6.52%	7
Miscellaneous Right	23,386	4.05%	3
RPR-UDF	216,323	37.41%	19
PS-PCF-PRG-The Greens	95,407	16.49%	9
Left	95,407	16.49%	9
FN	119,070	20.58%	13
Others	80,158	13.86%	5
MEI	35,895	6.21%	1
LCR-LO	31.798	5.50%	0
Total	578,651	100.00%	47
