= Kouarfa =

Coordinates: 10°29′N 1°31′E

- Arrondissement and town
- Interactive map of Kouarfa
- Country: Benin
- Department: Atakora Department
- Commune: Toucountouna

Population (2002)
  - Total: 9,809
- Time zone: UTC+1 (WAT)

Kouarfa is a town and arrondissement in the Atakora Department of northwestern Benin. It is an administrative division under the jurisdiction of the commune of Toucountouna. According to the population census conducted by the Institut National de la Statistique Benin on February 15, 2002, the arrondissement had a total population of 9,809.

It was the birthplace in 1933 of former President of Benin Mathieu Kérékou.
