= 1998 Brittany regional election =

A regional election took place in Brittany, France, on March 15, 1998, along with all other regions.

Party	Votes	%	Seats
UDF	330,210	27.12%	17
RPR	114,851	9.44%	17
Miscellaneous Right	26,302	2.17%	3
RPR-UDF	471,363	38.73%	37
PS-PCF-PRG-Les Verts	415,789	34.15%	31
The Greens	17,092	1.41%	3
Left	432,881	35.56%	34
FN	100,739	8.28%	7
LCR-LO	89,108	7.32%	3
Others	85,609	7.04%	1 CPNT
GE	37,907	3.12%	1
Total	1,217,607	100.00%	83
