= 1989 Micronesian general election =

1989 Micronesian parliamentary election
- 7 March 1989

10 out of 14 seats in Congress

Parliamentary elections were held in the Federated States of Micronesia on 7 March 1989 alongside a referendum on electing a Constitutional Convention. All candidates for seats in Congress ran as independents. The referendum was held in compliance with article 2, section 9 of the constitution, which specified that there must be a referendum on convening a Constitutional Convention at least every ten years. It was approved by 71% of voters, and the Constitutional Convention election was subsequently held in 1990.

== Results ==
=== Referendum ===
Shall there be a convention to revise or amend the Constitution?

Choice	Votes	%
For		71.0
Against		29.0
Invalid/blank votes		-
Total		100
Source: Direct Democracy
