= 1998 Sioux Falls mayoral election =

- April 14, 1998

Candidate	Gary W. Hanson	Anne Hajek	Robert Kolbe
Party	Nonpartisan	Nonpartisan	Nonpartisan
Popular vote	10,966	7,420	1,538
Percentage	55.04%	37.24%	7.72%
Mayor before election
Gary W. Hanson
Nonpartisan
Elected mayor
Gary W. Hanson
Nonpartisan

The 1998 Sioux Falls mayoral election took place on April 14, 1998. Incumbent Mayor Gary W. Hanson, who was first elected in 1994, ran for re-election to a second term. He was challenged by former City Councilmember Anne Hajek and County Commissioner Robert Kolbe. Hanson won re-election and avoided a runoff election, winning 55 percent of the vote to Hajek's 37 percent and Kolbe's 8 percent.

== Candidates ==
- Gary W. Hanson, incumbent Mayor
- Anne Hajek, former City Councilmember
- Robert Kolbe, Minnehaha County Commissioner

== Results ==
1998 Sioux Falls mayoral election
Party	Candidate	Votes	%
Nonpartisan	Gary W. Hanson (inc.)	10,966	55.04%
Nonpartisan	Anne Hajek	7,420	37.24%
Nonpartisan	Robert Kolbe	1,538	7.72%
Total votes		19,924	100.00%
