= 1989 Buffalo mayoral election =

- November 4, 1989
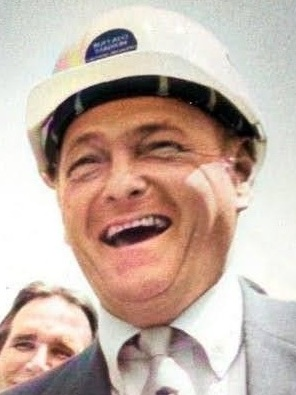
Nominee	Jimmy Griffin	Wilbur Trammell	William Hoyt
Party	Democratic	Independent	Liberal
Popular vote	47,157	11,033	9,632
Percentage	69.53%	16.27%	14.20%
Mayor before election
Jimmy Griffin
Democratic
Elected mayor
Jimmy Griffin
Democratic

The Buffalo mayoral election of 1989 took place on November 4, 1989, and resulted in incumbent mayor Jimmy Griffin winning his last term as mayor against two other opponents.
