= 1998 Arkansas lieutenant gubernatorial election =

- November 3, 1998
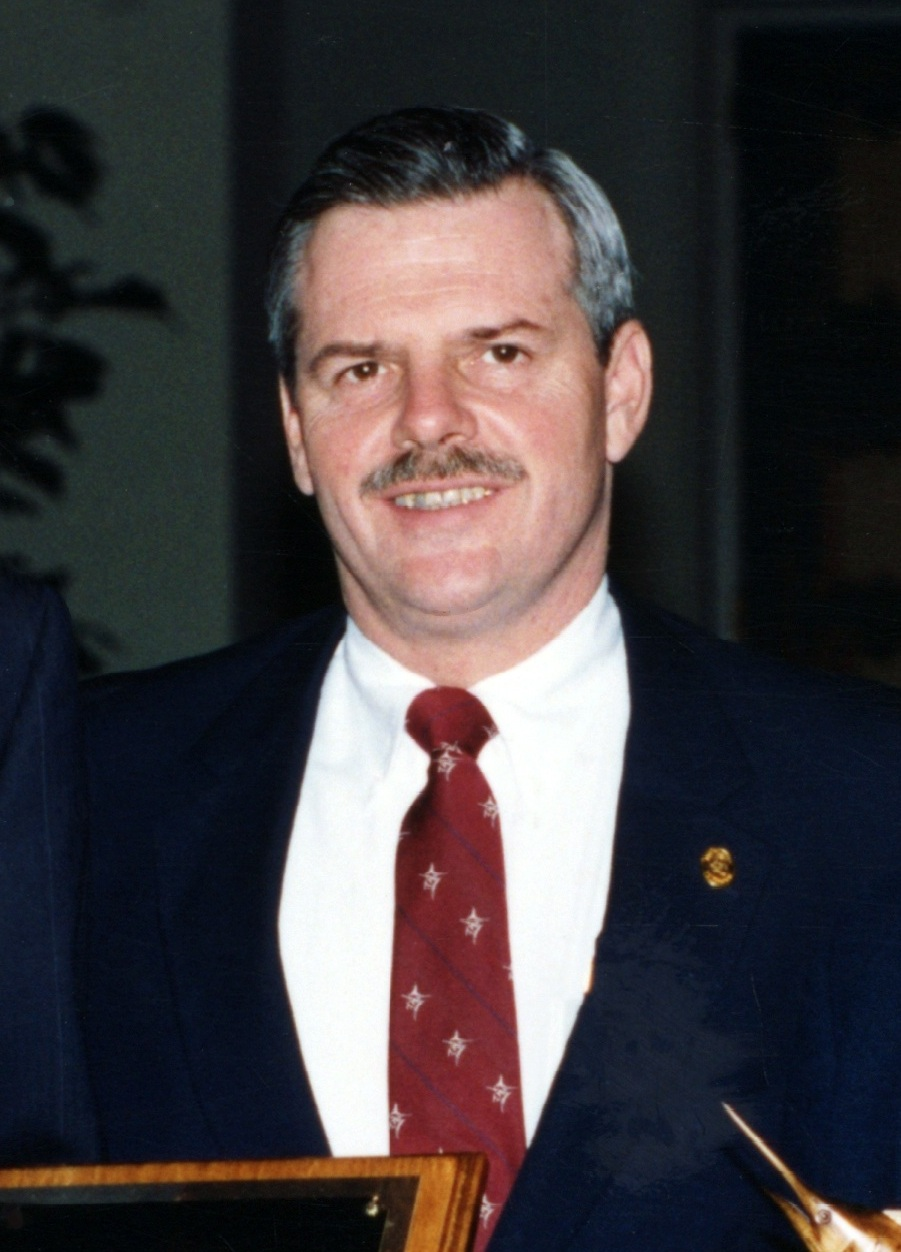

Nominee	Winthrop Paul Rockefeller	Kurt Dilday
Party	Republican	Democratic
Popular vote	461,430	230,730
Percentage	66.67%	33.33%
- County results Rockefeller: 50–60% 60–70% 70–80% Dilday: 50–60%
Lieutenant Governor before election
Winthrop Paul Rockefeller
Republican
Elected Lieutenant Governor
Winthrop Paul Rockefeller
Republican

The 1998 Arkansas lieutenant gubernatorial election was held on November 3, 1998, to elect the lieutenant governor of Arkansas. Republican incumbent Winthrop Paul Rockefeller, first elected in a special election in 1996, won election to a full term by a blowout margin of thirty-three percentage points over Democratic physician Kurt Dilday.

== General election ==
=== Candidates ===
- Winthrop Paul Rockefeller, incumbent lieutenant governor of Arkansas (1996–2006) (Republican)
- Kurt Dilday, physician (Democratic)

=== Results ===
1998 Arkansas lieutenant gubernatorial election results
Party	Candidate	Votes	%	±%
Republican	Winthrop Paul Rockefeller	461,430	66.67%	+16.07%
Democratic	Kurt Dilday	230,730	33.33%	−16.07%
Total votes		692,160	100.00%	
Republican hold				
