= 1998 California Superintendent of Public Instruction election =

- June 2, 1998 (primary); November 3, 1998 (runoff)
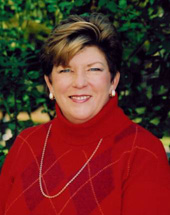

| Nominee | Delaine Eastin | Gloria Matta Tuchman | Barbara Carpenter |
| Party | Democratic | Nonpartisan | Nonpartisan |
| Popular vote | 2,201,116 | 1,300,547 | 654,866 |
| Percentage | 43.24% | 25.55% | 12.86% |
| Nominee | Mark Isler |
| Party | Republican |
| Popular vote | 610,465 |
| Percentage | 11.99% |
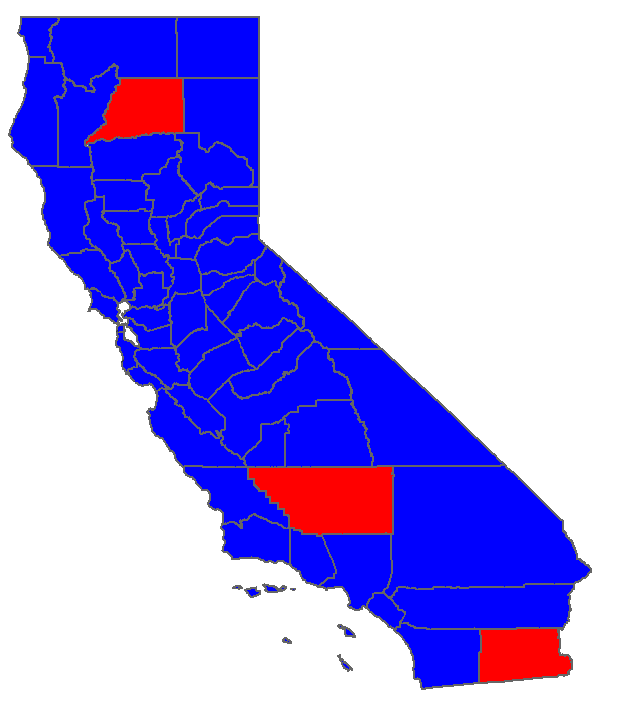
- Election results by county Delaine Eastin Gloria Matta Tuchman
SPI before election
Delaine Eastin
Nonpartisan
Elected SPI
Delaine Eastin
Nonpartisan

The 1998 California Superintendent of Public Instruction election occurred on June 2, 1998. Incumbent Delaine Eastin defeated Gloria Matta Tuchman in a runoff on November 3, 1998.

== Results ==
California Superintendent of Public Instruction election, 1998
| Candidate | Votes | % |
|---|---|---|
| Delaine Eastin (incumbent) | 2,201,116 | 43.24 |
| Gloria Matta Tuchman | 1,300,547 | 25.55 |
| Barbara Carpenter | 654,866 | 12.86 |
| Mark Isler | 610,465 | 11.99 |
| Miles Everett | 323,672 | 6.36 |
| Invalid or blank votes | 1,635,418 | 24.31 |
| Total votes | 5,090,666 | 100.00 |
| Turnout | {{{votes}}} | 32.57% |

=== Results by county ===
| County | Eastin | Votes | Tuchman | Votes | Carpenter | Votes | Isler | Votes | Everett | Votes |
|---|---|---|---|---|---|---|---|---|---|---|
| San Francisco | 62.14% | 83,717 | 16.16% | 21,766 | 11.48% | 15,466 | 5.69% | 7,672 | 4.53% | 6,099 |
| Alameda | 58.64% | 142,767 | 17.82% | 43,396 | 10.44% | 25,420 | 7.49% | 18,228 | 5.61% | 13,665 |
| Marin | 54.74% | 32,946 | 21.90% | 13,179 | 10.28% | 6,187 | 8.04% | 4,841 | 5.04% | 3,031 |
| Yolo | 53.07% | 18,460 | 22.33% | 7,766 | 9.13% | 3,175 | 9.97% | 3,467 | 5.50% | 1,913 |
| Santa Clara | 50.96% | 132,970 | 23.33% | 60,865 | 10.44% | 27,245 | 9.21% | 24,040 | 6.06% | 15,816 |
| San Mateo | 50.80% | 60,598 | 21.61% | 25,779 | 12.52% | 14,938 | 8.58% | 10,240 | 6.48% | 7,725 |
| Santa Cruz | 50.05% | 27,364 | 23.44% | 12,816 | 11.20% | 6,122 | 9.76% | 5,338 | 5.54% | 3,030 |
| Sierra | 48.81% | 679 | 21.21% | 295 | 9.92% | 138 | 13.80% | 192 | 6.25% | 87 |
| San Benito | 48.15% | 4,737 | 23.22% | 2,284 | 11.72% | 1,153 | 11.34% | 1,116 | 5.57% | 548 |
| Contra Costa | 47.89% | 89,424 | 24.04% | 44,882 | 11.97% | 22,348 | 10.50% | 19,609 | 5.60% | 10,461 |
| San Luis Obispo | 47.86% | 28,916 | 24.78% | 14,973 | 10.40% | 6,282 | 11.67% | 7,051 | 5.28% | 3,190 |
| Plumas | 46.98% | 2,981 | 21.48% | 1,363 | 11.82% | 750 | 13.96% | 886 | 5.75% | 365 |
| Sonoma | 46.40% | 46,968 | 23.98% | 24,279 | 12.38% | 12,530 | 10.12% | 10,242 | 7.12% | 7,211 |
| Sacramento | 46.18% | 108,442 | 23.60% | 55,430 | 10.01% | 23,509 | 13.86% | 32,542 | 6.35% | 14,908 |
| Lassen | 45.82% | 2,894 | 21.17% | 1,337 | 11.05% | 698 | 13.63% | 861 | 8.33% | 526 |
| Nevada | 45.72% | 12,529 | 26.46% | 7,251 | 10.18% | 2,790 | 12.15% | 3,329 | 5.49% | 1,505 |
| Santa Barbara | 45.44% | 35,681 | 25.31% | 19,877 | 11.59% | 9,103 | 12.23% | 9,605 | 5.42% | 4,257 |
| Monterey | 45.28% | 26,637 | 26.29% | 15,467 | 11.71% | 6,887 | 10.96% | 6,445 | 5.77% | 3,392 |
| Alpine | 45.05% | 205 | 19.34% | 88 | 16.48% | 75 | 12.31% | 56 | 6.81% | 31 |
| Napa | 45.04% | 13,617 | 26.42% | 7,986 | 12.45% | 3,764 | 10.43% | 3,154 | 5.65% | 1,709 |
| Solano | 45.00% | 28,331 | 25.51% | 16,063 | 11.50% | 7,241 | 10.89% | 6,858 | 7.09% | 4,464 |
| Modoc | 44.74% | 1,315 | 23.85% | 701 | 12.18% | 358 | 12.56% | 369 | 6.67% | 196 |
| Amador | 43.73% | 4,339 | 24.03% | 2,384 | 10.37% | 1,029 | 15.63% | 1,551 | 6.24% | 619 |
| Calaveras | 43.51% | 5,280 | 21.22% | 2,575 | 11.83% | 1,436 | 15.49% | 1,880 | 7.95% | 965 |
| Los Angeles | 42.87% | 503,160 | 25.42% | 298,377 | 13.97% | 163,986 | 10.82% | 126,967 | 6.93% | 81,307 |
| Placer | 42.73% | 22,876 | 25.47% | 13,637 | 10.71% | 5,734 | 14.88% | 7,967 | 6.21% | 3,322 |
| Mono | 42.41% | 1,117 | 22.97% | 605 | 12.98% | 342 | 13.25% | 349 | 8.39% | 221 |
| Humboldt | 42.36% | 12,837 | 23.84% | 7,225 | 13.47% | 4,083 | 13.36% | 4,048 | 6.97% | 2,113 |
| Stanislaus | 41.89% | 25,428 | 20.36% | 12,357 | 14.92% | 9,060 | 16.68% | 10,123 | 6.16% | 3,739 |
| Mendocino | 41.75% | 7,971 | 26.00% | 4,965 | 13.81% | 2,637 | 10.77% | 2,056 | 7.67% | 1,465 |
| Colusa | 41.34% | 1,418 | 26.27% | 901 | 11.11% | 381 | 14.87% | 510 | 6.41% | 220 |
| Tuolumne | 40.80% | 5,674 | 24.57% | 3,417 | 11.81% | 1,643 | 16.73% | 2,326 | 6.09% | 847 |
| El Dorado | 40.67% | 15,229 | 25.54% | 9,562 | 11.39% | 4,264 | 15.22% | 5,701 | 7.18% | 2,689 |
| Lake | 40.47% | 5,434 | 22.09% | 2,966 | 16.38% | 2,199 | 14.30% | 1,920 | 6.77% | 909 |
| Butte | 40.40% | 18,819 | 32.11% | 14,958 | 9.18% | 4,274 | 12.77% | 5,947 | 5.55% | 2,584 |
| San Joaquin | 40.34% | 33,364 | 28.32% | 23,423 | 11.35% | 9,386 | 14.38% | 11,892 | 5.61% | 4,642 |
| Del Norte | 40.18% | 2,290 | 20.02% | 1,141 | 17.74% | 1,011 | 14.88% | 848 | 7.18% | 409 |
| Siskiyou | 40.15% | 4,556 | 27.82% | 3,157 | 13.90% | 1,577 | 11.56% | 1,312 | 6.57% | 746 |
| San Diego | 38.96% | 163,753 | 27.11% | 113,952 | 13.75% | 57,770 | 13.98% | 58,757 | 6.20% | 26,064 |
| Ventura | 38.50% | 49,313 | 28.18% | 36,095 | 14.83% | 19,001 | 12.56% | 16,090 | 5.93% | 7,596 |
| Trinity | 38.48% | 1,421 | 26.59% | 982 | 13.81% | 510 | 13.51% | 499 | 7.61% | 281 |
| San Bernardino | 38.40% | 71,053 | 27.10% | 50,141 | 13.85% | 25,624 | 13.40% | 24,788 | 7.25% | 13,423 |
| Fresno | 38.19% | 41,516 | 27.35% | 29,733 | 15.51% | 16,864 | 13.72% | 14,913 | 5.22% | 5,676 |
| Yuba | 37.99% | 3,986 | 26.99% | 2,831 | 12.08% | 1,267 | 15.45% | 1,621 | 7.49% | 786 |
| Merced | 37.52% | 9,203 | 24.84% | 6,093 | 19.88% | 4,877 | 12.10% | 2,967 | 5.66% | 1,388 |
| Inyo | 36.95% | 1,773 | 22.15% | 1,063 | 13.82% | 663 | 15.04% | 722 | 12.04% | 578 |
| Sutter | 36.79% | 6,130 | 28.52% | 4,753 | 16.90% | 1,985 | 11.91% | 2,816 | 5.88% | 980 |
| Mariposa | 35.67% | 1,916 | 24.41% | 1,311 | 13.11% | 704 | 19.98% | 1,073 | 6.83% | 367 |
| Tulare | 35.32% | 16,415 | 30.06% | 13,974 | 13.93% | 6,477 | 14.40% | 6,693 | 6.29% | 2,922 |
| Riverside | 35.15% | 69,018 | 26.88% | 52,789 | 15.49% | 30,413 | 15.39% | 30,222 | 7.09% | 13,922 |
| Glenn | 34.03% | 2,167 | 32.34% | 2,059 | 13.13% | 836 | 14.62% | 931 | 5.87% | 374 |
| Orange | 33.96% | 134,218 | 32.65% | 129,064 | 13.17% | 52,050 | 13.89% | 54,911 | 6.33% | 25,038 |
| Madera | 33.19% | 6,098 | 28.60% | 5,256 | 13.74% | 2,525 | 18.73% | 3,442 | 5.74% | 1,054 |
| Tehama | 33.01% | 4,624 | 27.29% | 3,823 | 15.62% | 2,188 | 17.31% | 2,425 | 6.77% | 949 |
| Kings | 32.26% | 5,188 | 24.35% | 3,916 | 17.75% | 2,855 | 18.69% | 3,006 | 6.96% | 1,119 |
| Shasta | 31.52% | 10,691 | 34.23% | 11,610 | 12.59% | 4,271 | 15.64% | 5,305 | 6.01% | 2,038 |
| Kern | 30.26% | 25,361 | 31.15% | 26,106 | 13.07% | 10,951 | 17.74% | 14,871 | 7.78% | 6,516 |
| Imperial | 27.66% | 5,302 | 28.71% | 5,503 | 19.90% | 3,814 | 15.00% | 2,875 | 8.74% | 1,675 |

== See also ==
- 1998 California elections
- State of California
- California Department of Education
