= 1998 San Marino local elections =

The 1998 San Marino local elections were held on 13 December to elect the mayors and the councils of Acquaviva, Borgo Maggiore, Faetano, Fiorentino and Serravalle in San Marino. Overall turnout was 64.0%.

== Electoral system ==
Voters elected the mayor (Italian: capitano di castello) and the municipal council (giunta di castello). The number of seats was determined by law: the city councils of Acquaviva, Faetano and Fiorentino were composed of eight members; the councils of Borgo Maggiore and Serravalle were composed of 10 members.

Candidates ran on lists led by a mayoral candidate. Voters elected a list and were allowed to give up to two preferential votes. Seats were allocated with the d'Hondt method if the winner had obtained at least 60% of the votes. Otherwise, six seats would have been allocated to the winning party (five seats where the council was composed of eight seats) and the rest of the seats would have been allocated using the d'Hondt method to the rest of the parties. The winning list mayoral candidate was proclaimed mayor.

In the municipalities where only one list contested the election, the election was considered valid if the turnout was over 50% and the votes to the list were over 50% of the valid votes (votes to the list plus blank votes).

== Results ==
=== Acquaviva ===
List	Mayoral candidate	Votes	%	Seats
List A	Silvano Semprini	375	58.05	5
List B	Maria Sonia Casadei	271	41.95	3
Total		646	100.00	8
Valid votes		646	93.08	
Invalid/blank votes		48	6.92	
Total votes		694	100.00	
Registered voters/turnout		938	73.99	

=== Borgo Maggiore ===
List	Mayoral candidate	Votes	%	Seats
List A	Pier Orazio Pignatta	1,298	60.68	6
List B	Fabio Canini	841	39.32	4
Total		2,139	100.00	10
Valid votes		2,139	91.02	
Invalid/blank votes		211	8.98	
Total votes		2,350	100.00	
Registered voters/turnout		3,946	59.55	

=== Faetano ===
List	Mayoral candidate	Votes	%	Seats
List A	Barbara Montanari	266	100.00	8
Total		266	100.00	8
Valid votes		266	74.51	
Invalid/blank votes		91	25.49	
Total votes		357	100.00	
Registered voters/turnout		654	54.59	

=== Fiorentino ===
List	Mayoral candidate	Votes	%	Seats
List B	Renzo Giudi	504	56.19	5
List C	Nella Casali	289	32.22	2
List A	Georges Santi	104	11.59	1
Total		897	100.00	8
Valid votes		897	92.67	
Invalid/blank votes		71	7.33	
Total votes		968	100.00	
Registered voters/turnout		1,327	72.95	

=== Serravalle ===
List	Mayoral candidate	Votes	%	Seats
List A	Luciana Giudi	2,126	62.07	6
List B	Fabio Mazza	1,299	37.93	4
Total		3,425	100.00	10
Valid votes		3,425	90.85	
Invalid/blank votes		345	9.15	
Total votes		3,770	100.00	
Registered voters/turnout		5,852	64.42	
