= 1998 Abkhazian local elections =

- 14 March 1998
- Local assembly seats across 148 precincts (excluding Gali District)
| Party | Leader | Vote % | Seats | +/– |
|---|---|---|---|---|
| Independents / Initiative Groups | | | | |
This lists parties that won seats. See the complete results below.

The local elections were held in Republic of Abkhazia, a self-proclaimed internationally unrecognized entity, in 1998.

== Background ==
On 11 December 1997, Parliament adopted the law on local bodies of self-government. President Ardzinba then issues a decree setting local elections for 14 March 1998. For the purpose of the elections, 148 precincts were created: 16 in the city of Sukhumi. 13 in the Sukhumi District, 33 in Ochamchira District, 29 in Gudauta District, 25 in Gagra District, 17 in Tkvarcheli District and 17 in Gulripshi District. The government stated that it was unable to hold elections in Gali District.

In April, after the elections, President Ardzinba appointed Heads of the District Administrations.
