= 1989 Maldivian parliamentary election =

Parliamentary elections were held in the Maldives on 24 November 1989. As there were no political parties at the time, all candidates ran as independents. Voter turnout was 68.7%.

== Results ==
Party	Votes	%	Seats
Independents	57,402	100.00	48
Total	57,402	100.00	48
Valid votes	57,402	92.77	
Invalid/blank votes	4,473	7.23	
Total votes	61,875	100.00	
Registered voters/turnout	90,084	68.69	
Source: IPU
