= 1998 Kyrgyz constitutional referendum =

- 17 October 1998
- Do you approve the Law of the Kyrgyz Republic "On amendments and additions of the Constitution of the Kyrgyz Republic", a draft which was published in the Decree of the President of the Kyrgyz Republic on 1 October 1998 "On the referendum (nation-wide voting) in the Kyrgyz Republic on 17 October 1998"?

Results
Choice	Votes	%
Yes	2,075,899	95.38%
No	100,592	4.62%
Valid votes	2,176,491	99.08%
Invalid or blank votes	20,100	0.92%
Total votes	2,196,591	100.00%
Registered voters/turnout	2,277,592	96.44%

A constitutional referendum was held in Kyrgyzstan on 17 October 1998. The main provisions of the referendum were the introduction of the private ownership of land for citizens of Kyrgyzstan; a change in the distribution of seats in parliament - increasing number of seats in Legislative Assembly from 35 to 60 and reducing the number of seats in Assembly of People's Representatives from 70 to 45, removing the right of MPs to alter the national budget without the government's approval, increasing the freedom of independent media of Kyrgyzstan, and limiting the level of legal immunity awarded to MPs.

The changes were approved by 95% of voters, with turnout reported to be 96%.

== Results ==
Choice	Votes	%
For	2,075,899	95.38
Against	100,592	4.62
Total	2,176,491	100.00
Valid votes	2,176,491	99.08
Invalid/blank votes	20,100	0.92
Total votes	2,196,591	100.00
Registered voters/turnout	2,277,592	96.44
Source: Nohlen et al.
