= 1989–1991 Belizean municipal elections =

Local elections were held in the country of Belize in two parts in 1989 and 1991. Part one was the Belize City Council election held on December 6, 1989, in which the newly elected People's United Party swept all nine seats in Belize City. Part two came more than a year later on March 25, 1991 with municipal elections in the district towns. Here the PUP won 35 of 49 seats, while the UDP won the remaining fourteen.
