= 1998 Long Beach, California, mayoral election =

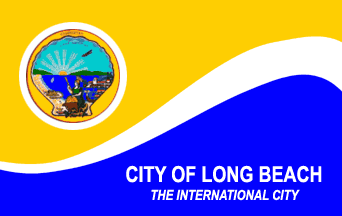
- April 14, 1998

Candidate	Beverly O'Neill	Lee Davis
Party	Nonpartisan	Nonpartisan
Popular vote	28,216	2,665
Percentage	79.2%	7.4%
Candidate	"Ski" Demski
Party	Nonpartisan
Popular vote	2,255
Percentage	6.3%
Mayor before election
Beverly O'Neill
Nonpartisan
Elected mayor
Beverly O'Neill
Nonpartisan

Long Beach, California, held an election for Mayor of Long Beach, California, on April 14, 1998. It saw the reelection of Beverly O'Neill.

== Results ==
Results
Candidate	Votes	%
Beverly O'Neill (incumbent)	28,216	79.2
Lee Davis	2,665	7.4
"Ski" Demski	2,255	6.3
G. Juan Johnson	1,400	3.9
Karl A. Tiedemann	1,073	3.0
Total votes	35,609	
