= 1998 Shreveport mayoral election =

- October 3, 1998 (first round)
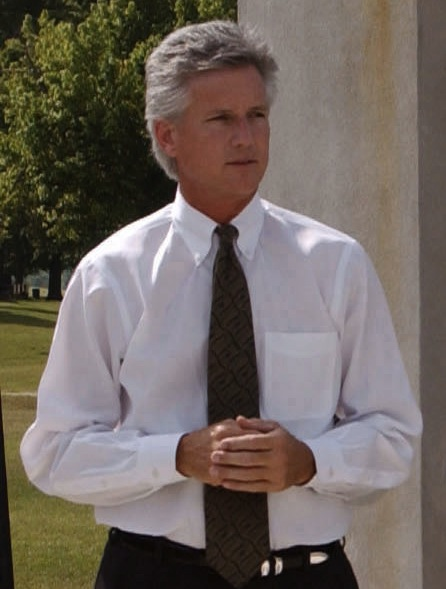

Candidate	Keith Hightower	Bo Williams
Party	Democratic	Republican
First round	20,294; 41.89%	13,658; 28.19%
Runoff	Winner by default	Withdrew
Candidate	Theron "TJ" Jackson	Larry English
Party	Democratic	Democratic
First round	8,118; 16.76%	5,226; 10.79%
Runoff	Eliminated	Eliminated
Mayor before election
Robert W. "Bo" Williams
Republican
Elected mayor
Keith Hightower
Democratic

The 1998 Shreveport mayoral election resulted in the defeat of Republican incumbent Robert W. "Bo" Williams by Democratic councilman Keith Hightower. As Hightower did not win at least 50% of the vote in the primary, he and mayor Williams were entitled to a run-off election. However, Williams declined to run in the second round making Hightower the mayor-elect after the first round of voting.

== Results ==
1998 Mayor of Shreveport primary election
Party	Candidate	Votes	%
Democratic	Keith Hightower	20,294	41.89%
Republican	Robert W. "Bo" Williams	13,658	28.19%
Democratic	Theron "TJ" Jackson	8,118	16.76%
Democratic	Larry English	5,226	10.79%
Republican	Ward Elmo Bryant, Jr.	1,151	2.38%
Total votes		48,447	100%
