= Aboriginal land councils in the Northern Territory =

Areas of Aboriginal self-governance

Aboriginal land councils in the Northern Territory are representative bodies known as land councils, covering four areas of Aboriginal self-governance in the Northern Territory of Australia.

== Land councils ==
There are four land councils in the Northern Territory:

- the Anindilyakwa Land Council, covering Groote Eylandt in the Gulf of Carpentaria.
- the Central Land Council is in the southern half of the Northern Territory, representing around 24,000 Aboriginal people from nine sub-districts across 777,000 km^{2} (300,000 sq mi).
- the Northern Land Council, covering the Top End.
- the Tiwi Land Council, covering Bathurst and Melville Islands north of Darwin.

== History ==
The Aboriginal Land Rights (Northern Territory) Act 1976 established the basis upon which Aboriginal people in the Northern Territory could, for the first time, claim rights to land based on traditional occupation. In effect it allowed title to be transferred for most of the Aboriginal reserve lands and the opportunity to claim other land not owned, leased or being used by someone else.

The land councils are representative bodies with statutory authority under the Act. They also have responsibilities under the Native Title Act 1993 and the Pastoral Land Act 1992.

They are administered through distribution of 40% of the annual royalties collected as part of the Aboriginals Benefit Account.

The Northern Territory Emergency Response provided for the Commonwealth Government to compulsorily acquire five-year leases of townships currently held under the title provisions of the Native Title Act 1993, though with compensation on a basis other than just terms.

== See also ==
- Bagot Community
- Local government areas of the Northern Territory
