= 5 November 1989 Lebanese presidential election =

- 5 November 1989
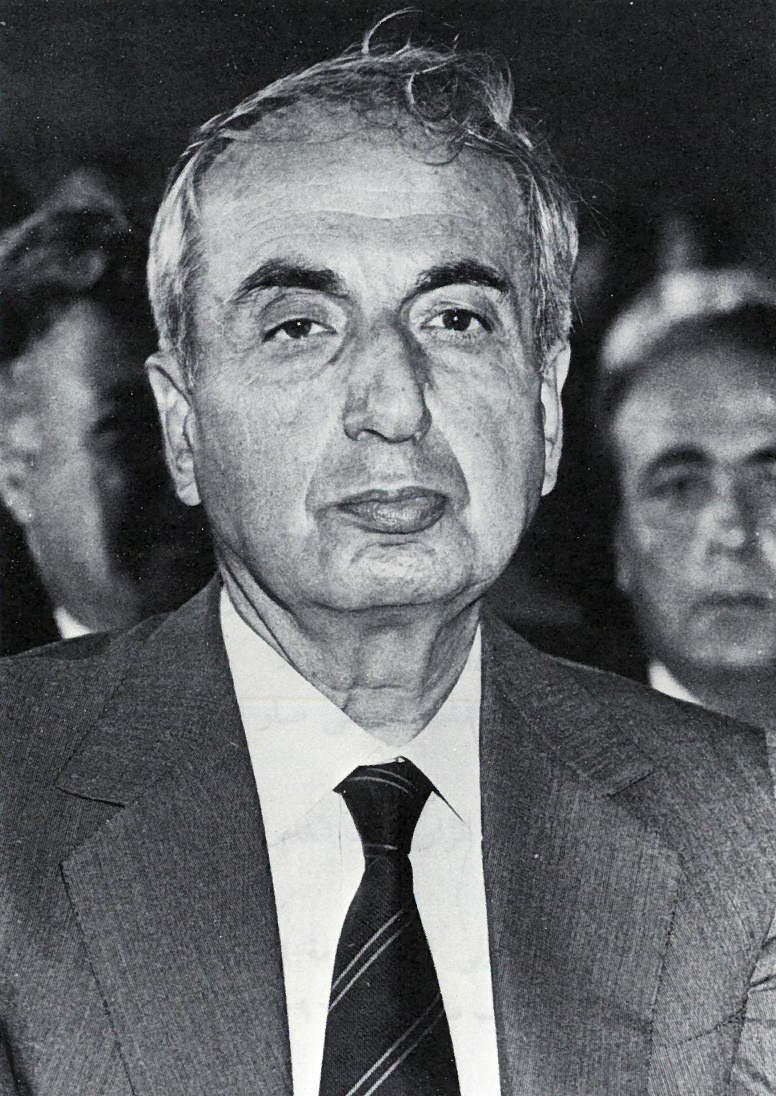

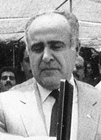
Nominee	René Moawad	Georges Saadeh
Party	Independent	Kataeb
Electoral vote	52	16
Percentage	72.22%	27.88%
President before election
Salim Al-Huss (acting)
Independent
Elected President
René Moawad
Independent

An indirect presidential election was held in the Parliament of Lebanon on 5 November 1989, resulting in Deputy René Moawad being elected President of the Lebanese Republic.

By convention, the presidency is always attributed to a Maronite Christian. Under the article 49 of the Lebanese Constitution, a qualified majority of two-thirds of the 72 alive members (no election had been held since 1970) of the then 99-seat Lebanese Parliament is required to elect the president in the first round. After the second round of election, the president is elected by an absolute majority of the total number of deputies in office.

René Moawad, a deputy representing Zgharta in North Lebanon, was a politician known for his moderate views, and was endorsed by Syria with the promise of signing into law the Taif Accord (constitutional changes to end the Civil War, and give Muslims a greater say in the government than before). He was elected on the 5 November 1989 by 52 of the 58 attending MPs.

== Results ==
Due to the ongoing Civil War, only 58 of the 72 deputies were present for the elections (the chamber was composed of 99 deputies, but as there had been no elections since 1970, there were only 72 MPs still alive). In the first round, a majority of two-thirds of present deputies was required; in the second round, however, only a simple majority was needed.

The deputies met at the Qoleiat air base (now known as René Moawad Air Base) in North Lebanon - far from the capital Beirut where fighting was still taking place - as the unrecognized Prime Minister (and acting president) Michel Aoun was residing in the Baabda Presidential Palace and refused to recognize or allow the election to take place. The meeting was of questionable validity as General Aoun had dissolved the Chamber of Deputies the day prior and set general elections in January; thus, according to him, the Deputies no longer had a mandate.

Candidate	First round		Second round	
Candidate	Votes	%	Votes	%
René Moawad	35	48.6	52	72.2
Georges Saadeh	16	22.2		
Elias Hrawi	5	6.9		
Invalid/blank votes	0	–	6	–
Total	58	80.6	58	80.6
Eligible voters	72	100	72	100
Source: The Monthly

== Aftermath ==
General Aoun refused to accept the results of the election and continued governing as the unrecognized Prime Minister. However, seventeen days after the elections, on Independence Day, a 250 kg car bomb was detonated, killing Moawad and 23 others. The Parliament convened a few days later to elect Elias Hrawi as his successor, who then signed the Taif Accord and oversaw the end of the Lebanese Civil War.
