= 1989 Houston mayoral election =

- November 7, 1989
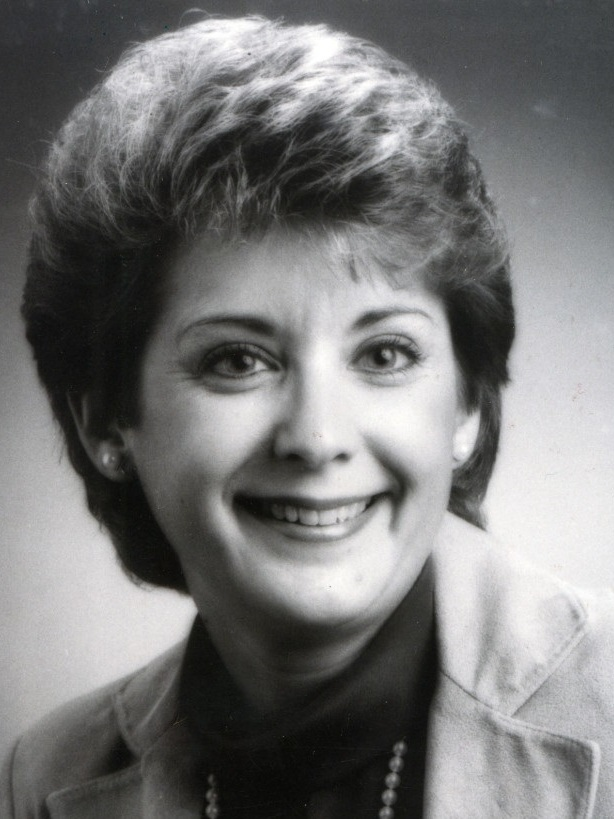

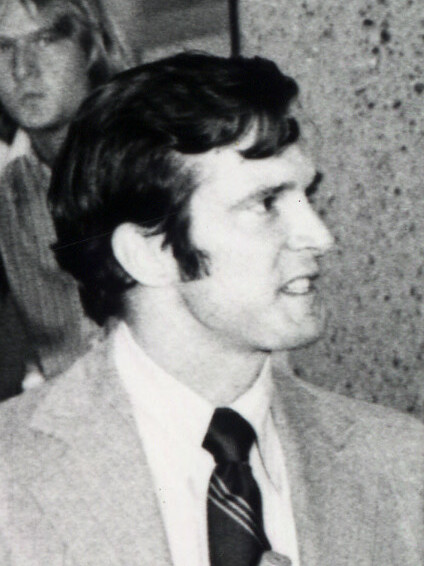
Nominee	Kathy Whitmire	Fred Hofheinz
Popular vote	176,342	88,971
Percentage	63%	32%
Mayor before election
Kathy Whitmire
Elected mayor
Kathy Whitmire

The 1989 Houston mayoral election took place on November 7, 1989. Incumbent Mayor Kathy Whitmire was re-elected to a fifth term. It was the last election of someone over three terms. (Before the Term Limits).

== Candidates ==
- Incumbent Mayor Kathy Whitmire
- Former Mayor Fred Hofheinz
- Ted Walker
- Rosie Walker
- Shelby Oringderff

== Results ==
Houston mayoral election, 1989
Candidate	Votes	%
Kathy Whitmire (incumbent)	176,342	63%
Fred Hofheinz	88,971	32%
Ted Walker	5,615	2%
Rosie Walker	4,667	2%
Shelby Oringderff	2,018	1%
