= People's Revolutionary Party of Benin =

Ruling party of Benin from 1975 to 1990

People's Revolutionary Party of Benin Parti de la révolution populaire du Bénin
- Abbreviation: PRPB
- Governing body: Central Committee
- Founder: Mathieu Kérékou
- Founded: 30 November 1975 (50 years, 302 days)
- Dissolved: 30 April 1990 (36 years, 151 days)
- Succeeded by: Union of Forces of Progress
- Headquarters: Porto-Novo
- Newspaper: Ehuzu
- Youth wing: Organisation de la Jeunesse Révolutionnaire du Bénin (French)
- Women's wing: Organisation des Femmes Révolutionnaires du Bénin
- Ideology: Communism; Marxism–Leninism; Beninese nationalism Left-wing nationalism
- Colors: Red; Yellow

Party flag

The People's Revolutionary Party of Benin (French: Parti de la Révolution Populaire du Bénin, PRPB) was a Marxist-Leninist political party in the People's Republic of Benin. It was founded in 1975 by Mathieu Kérékou, a General. Under the new constitution of 30 November 1975, the PRPB became the sole legal political party in the country. Ideologically, the party officially adhered to Marxism–Leninism, although it was broadly nationalist in practice.

== History ==
In 1972, the former French colony of Republic of Dahomey experienced a military coup d'état, bringing Major Mathieu Kérékou to power. In 1975, Kérékou announced that the country would be renamed Benin and that a new political organisation, the People's Revolutionary Party of Benin would be established to participate in elections. It was subsequently decided that the PRPB would be the sole legal political party, creating a one-party state organised according to communist principles.

In the parliamentary elections of 1979, 1984 and 1989, the PRPB was the only party contesting in the elections. In 1979, the party lists received 1,243,286 votes (97.9%), in 1984, the party received 1,811,208 votes (98.1%) and in 1989, the party received 1,695,860 votes (89.6%).

In 1989, following the parliamentary election, the PRPB formally renounced Marxism–Leninism as its official ideological doctrine. The government also repealed the one-party state framework, permitting the formation of new political parties. The PRPB remained the governing force of Benin until 1990. The party subsequently dissolved, and Mathieu Kérékou contested the 1991 Beninese presidential election as an independent candidate rather than under the PRPB label. The PRPB was succeeded by the Union of Forces of Progress.

== Electoral history ==
=== Presidential elections ===
Election	Party candidate	Votes	%	Result	Ref.
President elected by the National Revolutionary Assembly
1980	Mathieu Kérékou	336	100%	Elected ✓	
1984	Mathieu Kérékou	196	100%	Elected ✓	
1989	Mathieu Kérékou	206	100%	Elected ✓	

=== National Revolutionary Assembly elections ===
Election	Party leader	Votes	%	Seats	+/–	Position	Result
1979	Mathieu Kérékou	1,248,613	98.3%	336 / 336	▲336	▲1st	Sole legal party
1984	Mathieu Kérékou	1,811,808	98.2%	196 / 196	▼140	1st	Sole legal party
1989	Mathieu Kérékou	1,695,860	89.6%	206 / 206	▲10	1st	Sole legal party

== See also ==
- National League of Patriotic Youth
