= 1998 United States Senate election in South Dakota =

- November 3, 1998
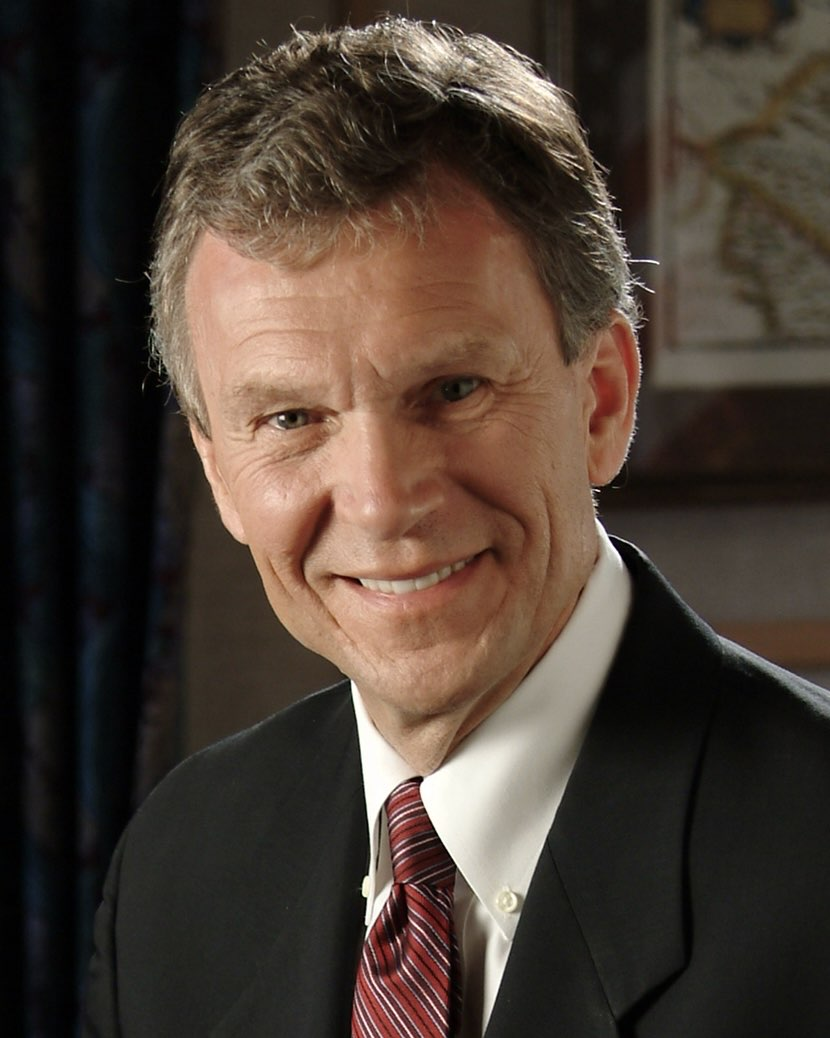

Nominee	Tom Daschle	Ron Schmidt
Party	Democratic	Republican
Popular vote	162,884	95,431
Percentage	62.14%	36.41%
- County results Daschle: 50–60% 60–70% 70–80% Schmidt: 40–50% 50–60%
U.S. senator before election
Tom Daschle
Democratic
Elected U.S. Senator
Tom Daschle
Democratic

The 1998 United States Senate election in South Dakota was held November 3, 1998. Democratic incumbent and Senate minority leader Tom Daschle was re-election to a third term in a landslide over attorney Ron Schmidt.

As of 2026, this was the last time a Democrat won the Class 3 Senate seat from South Dakota.

== Republican primary ==
=== Candidates ===
- Alan Aker
- John Sanders
- Ron Schmidt, attorney

=== Results ===
Republican primary results
Party	Candidate	Votes	%
Republican	Ron Schmidt	26,540	52.01%
Republican	Alan Aker	19,200	37.62%
Republican	John M. Sanders	5,292	10.37%
Total votes		51,032	100.00%

== General election ==
=== Candidates ===
- Byron Dale (Libertarian)
- Tom Daschle, incumbent U.S. senator since 1987 (Democratic)
- Ron Schmidt, attorney (Republican)

=== Polling ===
Poll source	Date(s)	Sample size	Margin of error	Tom Daschle (D)	Ron Schmidt (R)	Other / undecided (Note: Calculated by taking the difference of 100% and all other candidates combined.)
NRECA Market Research	October 20, 1998	500 (RV)	—	58%	26%	16%

=== Results ===
General election results
Party	Candidate	Votes	%	±%
Democratic	Tom Daschle (incumbent)	162,884	62.14%	▼2.76
Republican	Ron Schmidt	95,431	36.41%	▲3.90
Libertarian	Byron Dale	3,796	1.45%	▲0.15
Majority		67,453	25.73%	−6.66%
Turnout		262,111		
Democratic hold		Swing		

== See also ==
- 1998 United States Senate elections
