= 1989 Gazankulu legislative election =

Parliamentary elections were held in Gazankulu on 25 January 1989.

== Electoral system ==
The Legislative Assembly had a total of 86 members, of which half were elected and half appointed.
