= 1989 Toledo, Ohio mayoral election =

1989 Toledo mayoral election
- November 7, 1989

Candidate	John McHugh	Donna Owens
Party	Nonpartisan	Nonpartisan
Popular vote	63,848	25,936
Percentage	71.11%	28.89%
Mayor before election
Donna Owens
Nonpartisan
Elected mayor
John McHugh
Nonpartisan

The 1989 Dayton mayoral election took place on November 7, 1989. Incumbent Mayor Donna Owens ran for re-election to a fourth term. She was challenged by John McHugh, the former Chairman of the county Democratic Party. In the primary election, McHugh placed first by a wide margin, winning 69 percent of the vote to Owens's 31 percent. McHugh defeated Owens by a landslide in the general election, winning 71 percent of the vote.

== Primary election ==
=== Candidates ===
- John McHugh, former Chairman of the Lucas County Democratic Party (Democratic)
- Donna Owens, incumbent Mayor (Republican)

==== Declined ====
- Carty Finkbeiner, City Councilman (Democratic)
- Peter Ujvagi, City Councilman (Democratic)

=== Results ===
Primary election results
Party	Candidate	Votes	%
Nonpartisan	John McHugh	37,487	68.58%
Nonpartisan	Donna Owens (inc.)	16,927	30.96%
Write-in		251	0.46%
Total votes		54,665	100.00%

== General election ==
=== Results ===
1989 Toledo mayoral election results
Party	Candidate	Votes	%
Nonpartisan	John McHugh	63,848	71.11%
Nonpartisan	Donna Owens (inc.)	25,936	28.89%
Total votes		89,784	100.00%
