= 1998 Montenegrin local elections =

1998 Election

Montenegrin municipal elections were held in 1998.

== Results ==
=== Berane ===
Party	Votes	%	Seats
Democratic Party of Socialists	9,903	46.8%	18
Socialist People's Party	9,298	43.9%	16
Serb People's Party	685	3.2%	1
Serbian Radical Party	387	1.8%	0
Party of Democratic Action	362	1.7%	0
Liberal Alliance	263	1.2%	0
LUB-M	149	0.7%	0
New Communist Party of Yugoslavia	69	0.3%	0
Yugoslav Left	56	0.3%	0

=== Cetinje ===
Party	Votes	%	Seats
Democratic Party of Socialists	5,061	44.6%	16
Liberal Alliance	4,415	38.9%	13
Socialist People's Party	1,137	10%	3
Social Democratic Party	357	3.1%	1
League of Communists of Yugoslavia-Communists of Montenegro	171	1.5%	0
People's Party-Novak Kilibarda	98	0.9%	0
Montenegrin Federalist Neo-Greens Movement	62	0.5%	0
Serbian Radical Party	47	0.4%	0

=== Danilovgrad ===
Party	Votes	%	Seats
Democratic Party of Socialists	4,614	51.9%	18
Socialist People's Party	3,437	38.7%	13
Liberal Alliance	491	5.5%	2
Serb People's Party	208	2.3%	0
Serbian Radical Party "Vojislav Šešelj"	133	1.5%	0

=== Plav ===
Party	Votes	%	Seats
Democratic Party of Socialists	2,428	31.8%	11
Socialist People's Party	1,614	21.1%	7
Party of Democratic Action	1,236	16.2%	5
Social Democratic Party of Montenegro	1,090	14.3%	5
Democratic League in Montenegro	502	6.6%	2
Democratic Union of Albanians	443	5.8%	2
Serbian Radical Party	182	2.4%	0
Liberal Alliance	140	1.8%	0

=== Podgorica ===
Party	Votes	%	Seats
Democratic Party of Socialists	40,373	46.3%	27
Socialist People's Party	35,108	40.3%	23
Liberal Alliance	6,483	7.4%	4
Serb People's Party	1,800	2.1%	0
Democratic Union of Albanians	1,610	1.8%	0
Serbian Radical Party	798	0.9%	0
League of Communists of Yugoslavia-Communists of Montenegro	624	0.7%	0
Coalition "For Serb"	245	0.3%	0
Yugoslav Left	118	0.1%	0

=== Plužine ===
Party	Votes	%	Seats
Socialist People's Party	1,482	54.6%	18
Democratic Party of Socialists	596	22%	7
Serb People's Party	242	8.9%	2
League of Communists of Yugoslavia-Communists of Montenegro	212	7.8%	2
Serbian Radical Party	89	3.3%	1
Liberal Alliance	83	3.1%	1
Yugoslav Left	11	0.4%	0

=== Rožaje ===
Party	Votes	%	Seats
Democratic Party of Socialists	6,864	55.4%	19
Social Democratic Party	2,088	16.8%	6
LUB-M	1,474	11.9%	4
Socialist People's Party	852	6.9%	2
Liberal Alliance	400	3.2%	1
Party of Democratic Action	391	3.1%	1
Democratic League	302	2.4%	0
Serbian Radical Party "Vojislav Šešelj"	29	0.2%	0

=== Tivat ===
Party	Votes	%	Seats
Democratic Party of Socialists	2,841	39%	14
Socialist People's Party	1,564	21.5%	7
Social Democratic Party	916	12.6%	4
Liberal Alliance	838	11.5%	4
Serbian Radical Party	342	4.7%	1
Serb People's Party	270	3.7%	1
People's Party	269	3.7%	1

=== Ulcinj ===
Party	Votes	%	Seats
Democratic League	3,437	30.5%	11
Democratic Union of Albanians	2,896	25.7%	9
Democratic Party of Socialists	2,682	23.8%	8
Socialist People's Party	1,310	11.6%	4
Liberal Alliance	586	5.2%	1
Social Democratic Party	259	2.3%	0
Serbian Radical Party "Vojislav Šešelj"	105	0.9%	0
