= 1989 European Parliament election in Sardinia =

The European Parliament election of 1989 took place on 18 June 1989.

Christian Democracy was the largest party in Sardinia. Mario Melis (Sardinian Action Party) was re-elected to the European Parliament in the Islands constituency, thanks to an alliance with several regionalist parties notably including the Valdostan Union.

== Results ==
Parties	votes	votes (%)
Christian Democracy	331,590	35.9
Italian Communist Party	256,353	27.8
Italian Socialist Party	110,763	12.0
Sardinian Action Party	98,175	10.6
Italian Social Movement	34,024	3.7
Italian Democratic Socialist Party	26,841	2.9
Italian Republican Party–Italian Liberal Party	19,592	2.1
Federation of Green Lists	17,955	1.9
Anti-Prohibition List	11,685	1.3
Rainbow Greens	8,551	0.9
Proletarian Democracy	7,409	0.8
Others	821	0.1
Total	923,759	100.0

Source: Ministry of the Interior
