= 1998 Stratford-on-Avon District Council election =

1998 UK local government election

The 1998 Stratford-on-Avon District Council election took place on 7 May 1998 to elect members of Stratford-on-Avon District Council in Warwickshire, England. One third of the council was up for election and the council stayed under no overall control.

After the election, the composition of the council was:

- Liberal Democrat 24
- Conservative 18
- Independent 6
- Labour 5
- Others 2

== Election result ==
Before the election the Liberal Democrats ran the council as a minority administration, with the Conservatives the second largest party. The election saw this continue with the Liberal Democrats making one gain in Henley ward from the Conservatives by 10 votes. However the Conservatives also ended the election with an extra seat after the independents lost 2 seats, including in Stratford Alveston. All 3 of the Liberal Democrat, Conservative and Labour group leaders successfully defended their seats in the election, with the Liberal Democrat council leader, Susan Juned holding Alcester with a 77% majority.

Stratford-on-Avon local election result 1998
Party	Seats	Gains	Losses	Net gain/loss	Seats %	Votes %	Votes	+/−
Liberal Democrats	10			+1	52.6			
Conservative	7			+1	36.8			
Labour	1			0	5.3			
Independent	1			-2	5.3			
