= 24 November 1989 Lebanese presidential election =

- 24 November 1989
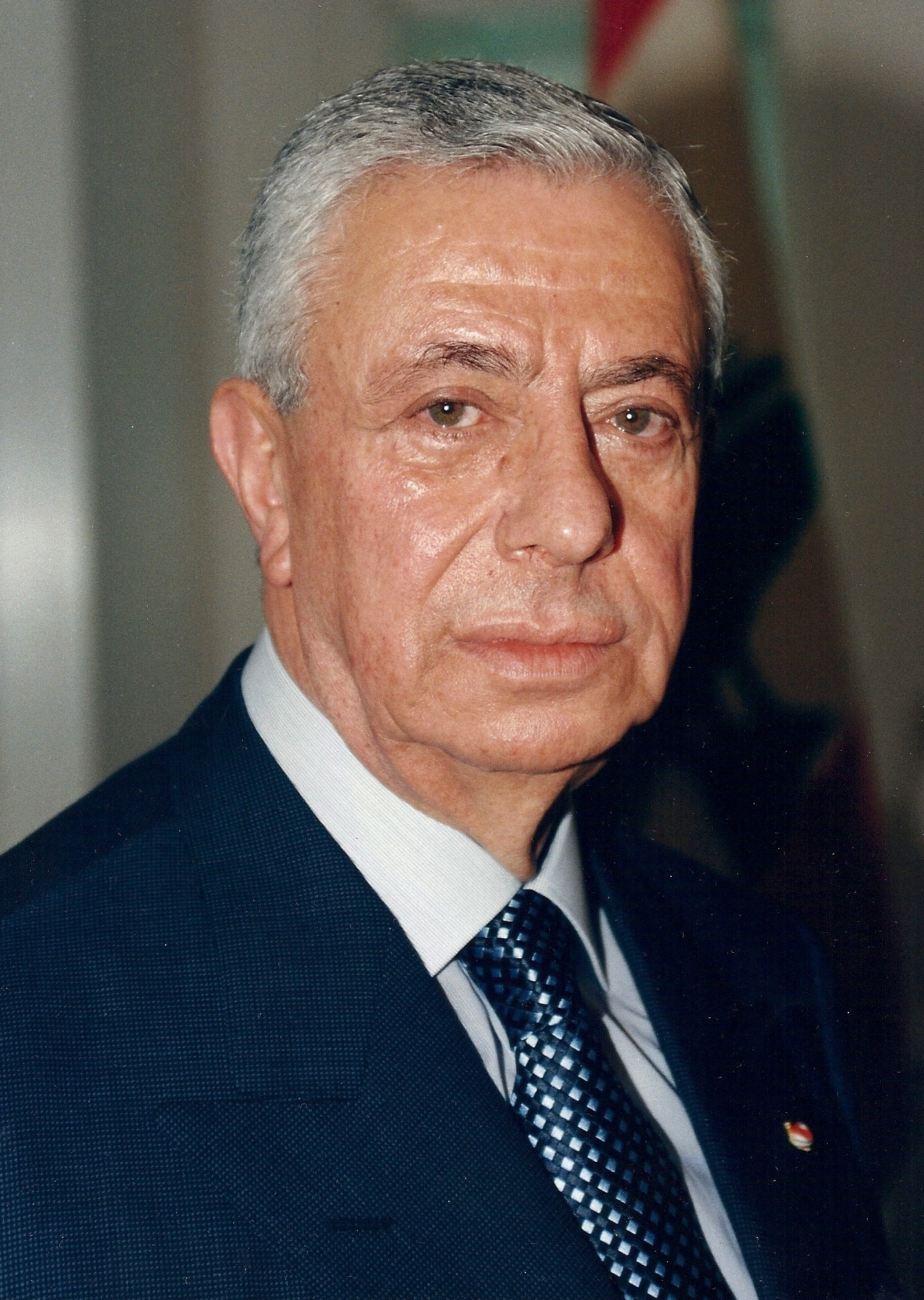
Nominee	Elias Hrawi
Party	Independent
Electoral vote	47
Percentage	65.28%
President before election
Salim Al-Huss (acting)
Independent
Elected President
Elias Hrawi
Independent

An indirect presidential election was held in the Parliament of Lebanon on 24 November 1989, resulting in Deputy Elias Hrawi being elected President of the Lebanese Republic.

By convention, the presidency is always attributed to a Maronite Christian. Under the article 49 of the Lebanese Constitution, a qualified majority of two-thirds of the members of the then 99-seat Lebanese Parliament is required to elect the president in the first round. After the second round of election, the president is elected by an absolute majority of the total deputies of the chamber.

Elias Hrawi, a deputy representing Zahlé, was supported by Syria and promised to sign into law the Taif Accord (constitutional changes to end the Civil War, and give Muslims a greater say in the government than before), and was elected on the 24 November 1989 by 47 of the 52 attending MPs.

== Results ==
Due to the ongoing Civil War, only 52 of the 72 alive deputies (there were 99 in the chamber, but no election had been held since 1972) were present at the election. This was the last election to take place before the constitutional changes mandated by the Taif Accord. In the first round, a majority of two-thirds of present deputies was required; in the second round, however, only a simple majority was needed.

The deputies met in Chtaura, a Syrian-controlled market town approximately 30 miles from Beirut, as the unrecognized Prime Minister (and acting president) Michel Aoun was residing in the Baabda Presidential Palace and refused to recognize or allow the election to take place; in fact, he had dissolved the Chamber of Deputies on 4 November and claimed the election was invalid.

Candidate	First round		Second round	
Candidate	Votes	%	Votes	%
Elias Hrawi	46	63.8	47	65.3
Edmond Rizk	1	1.4		
Invalid/blank votes	5	–	5	–
Total	52	72.2	52	72.2
Eligible voters	72	100	72	100
Source: The Monthly
