= 1998 United States Senate election in Oklahoma =

- November 3, 1998
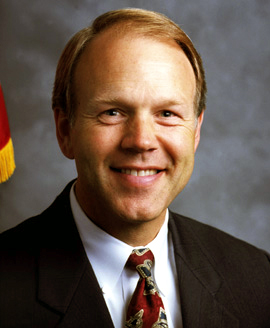

| Nominee | Don Nickles | Don Carroll |
| Party | Republican | Democratic |
| Popular vote | 570,682 | 268,898 |
| Percentage | 66.38% | 31.28% |
- County results Nickles: 40–50% 50–60% 60–70% 70–80% 80–90% Carroll: 50–60%
U.S. senator before election
Don Nickles
Republican
Elected U.S. Senator
Don Nickles
Republican

The 1998 United States Senate election in Oklahoma was held November 3, 1998. Republican incumbent Don Nickles won re-election to a fourth term in office over Don Carroll in a landslide. Carroll only carried Haskell County.

== General election ==
=== Candidates ===
- Don Carroll, air conditioning repairman (Democratic)
- Mike Morris (Independent)
- Don Nickles, incumbent U.S. senator since 1981 (Republican)
- Argus W. Yandell Jr. (Independent)

=== Polling ===
| Poll source | Date(s) administered | Sample size (Note: Key: A – all adults RV – registered voters LV – likely voters V – unclear) | Margin of error | Don Nickles (R) | Don Carroll (D) | Other / undecided (Note: Calculated by taking the difference of 100% and all other candidates combined.) |
|---|---|---|---|---|---|---|
| Tulsa Surveys | October 18, 1998 | 750 (A) | — | 63% | 16% | 21% |
| Tulsa Surveys | September 1998 | 750 (A) | ± 3.5% | 66% | 8% | 26% |

=== Results ===
1998 Oklahoma U.S. Senate Election
| Party | Candidate | Votes | % |
|---|---|---|---|
| Republican | Don Nickles (incumbent) | 570,682 | 66.38% |
| Democratic | Don Carroll | 268,898 | 31.28% |
| Independent | Mike Morris | 15,516 | 1.80% |
| Independent | Argus W. Jr. Yandell | 4,617 | 0.54% |
| Total votes | | 859,713 | 100.00% |
| Republican hold | | | |

== See also ==
- 1998 United States Senate elections
