= 1998 French regional elections =

- 15 March 1998

26 Regional Presidencies
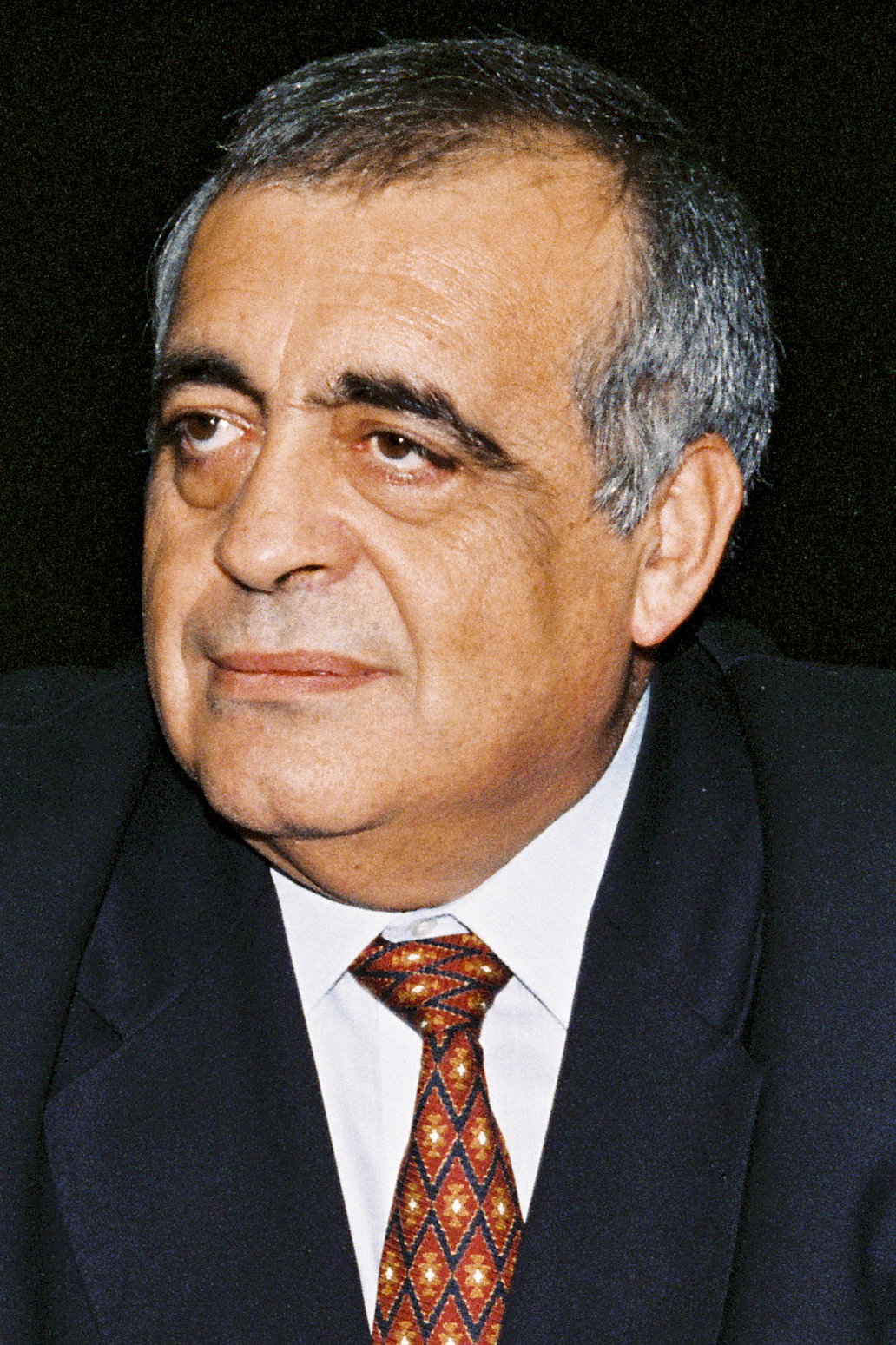

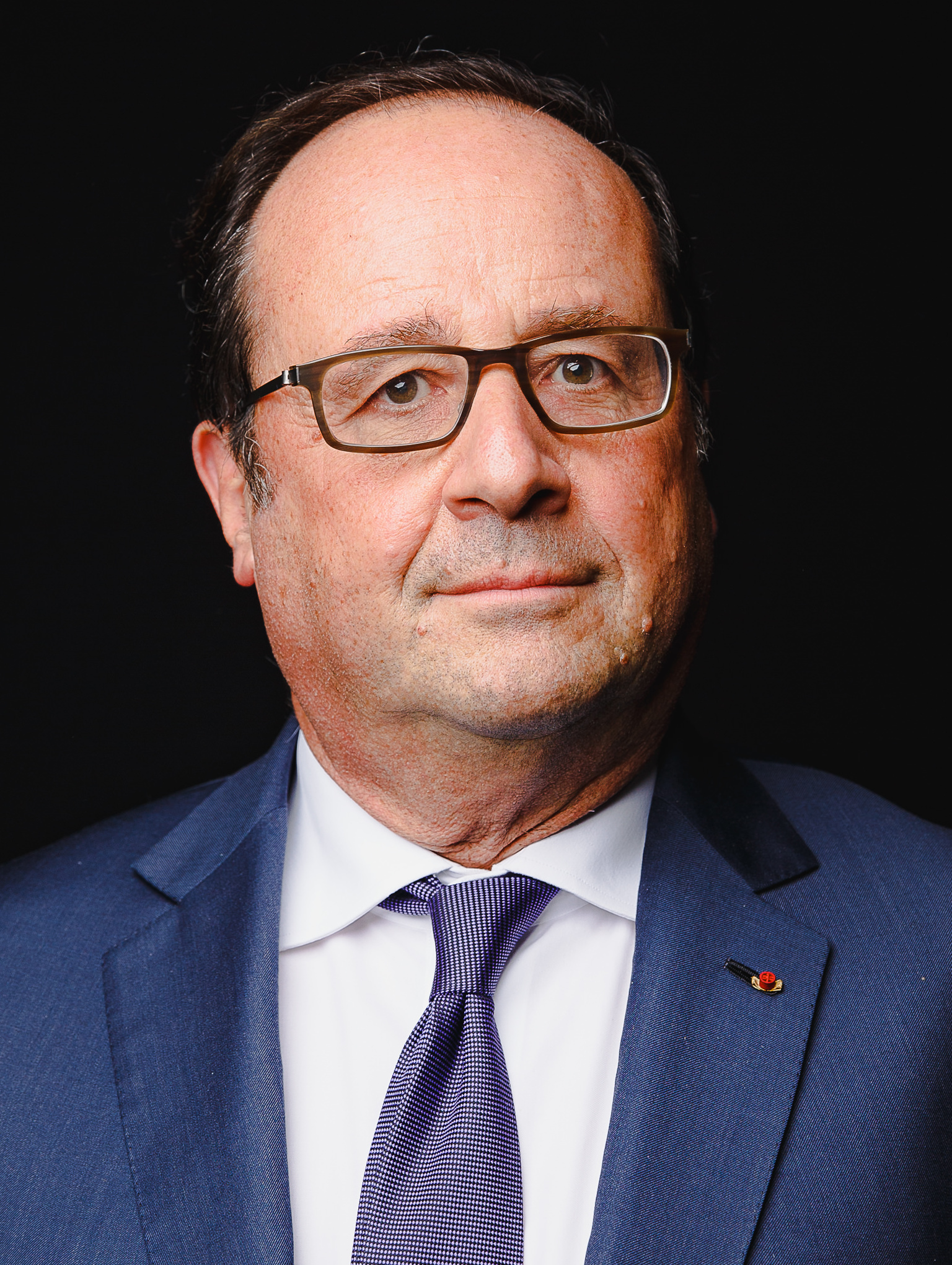

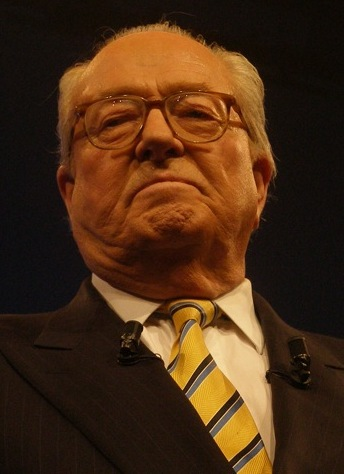
| | First party | Second party | Third party |
|---|---|---|---|
| Leader | Philippe Seguin | François Hollande | Jean-Marie Le Pen |
| Party | RPR | PS | FN |
| Regions | 15 | 10 | 0 |
| Change | ▼6 | ▲6 | Steady |
| Votes | 7,804,931 | 8,005,830 | 3,271,525 |
| Percentage | 35.63% | 36.55% | 14.94% |
- Presidents elected by region: Rally for the Republic; Union for French Democracy; Socialist Party; Martinican Independence Movement; Communist Party of Réunion; Miscellaneous left

Regional elections were held in France on 15 March 1998. At stake were the presidencies of each of France's 26 regions, which, though they don't have legislative autonomy, manage sizeable budgets.

The parliamentary right, led by the conservative Gaullist Rally for the Republic and the centre-right Union for French Democracy won the presidency of 15 of the 26 regions, the rest were won by the French Socialist Party and its allies (Communists, Greens, Radicals). The far-right National Front obtained good results, increasing its number of seats. The far-left and Hunting, Fishing, Nature, Tradition also won seats on various regional councils.

These election were the last ones conducted using the D'Hondt method and a closed list proportional representation, with a threshold of five percent of valid votes being applied regionally, later replaced by a two-round mixed-member majoritarian system for the 2004 elections.

== Presidents of the Regional Council ==
- Alsace: Adrien Zeller (UDF-FD, UMP)
- Aquitaine : Alain Rousset (PS)
- Auvergne : Valéry Giscard d'Estaing (UDF, UMP)
- Burgundy : Jean-Pierre Soisson (MDR-UDF, UMP) FN support
- Brittany : Josselin de Rohan (RPR, UMP)
- Champagne-Ardenne : Jean-Claude Étienne (RPR, UMP)
- Corse : José Rossi (RPR, UMP)
- Franche-Comté : Jean-François Humbert (UDF-PPDF, UMP)
- Guadeloupe : Lucette Michaux-Chevry (RPR, UMP)
- Guyane : Antoine Karam (PSG)
- Île-de-France : Jean-Paul Huchon (PS)
- Languedoc-Roussillon : Jacques Blanc (DL, UMP) FN support
- Limousin : Robert Savy (PS)
- Lorraine : Gérard Longuet (RPR, UMP)
- Martinique : Alfred Marie-Jeanne (MIM)
- Midi-Pyrénées : Martin Malvy (PS)
- Nord-Pas de Calais : Michel Delebarre (PS)
- Lower Normandy : René Garrec (DL, UMP)
- Upper Normandy : Alain Le Vern (PS)
- Pays de la Loire : François Fillon (RPR, UMP)
- Picardy : Charles Baur (UDF-FD, DVD, UMP) FN support
- Poitou-Charentes : Jean-Pierre Raffarin (UDF-DL, DL, UMP) replaced by Elisabeth Morin (UMP) CPNT support
- Provence-Alpes-Côte d'Azur : Michel Vauzelle (PS)
- Réunion : Paul Vergès (PCR)
- Rhône-Alpes : Charles Millon (UDF-DL, DLC) replaced by Anne-Marie Comparini (UDF)
