= Mathieu Kérékou =

Beninese politician, former president (1933–2015)

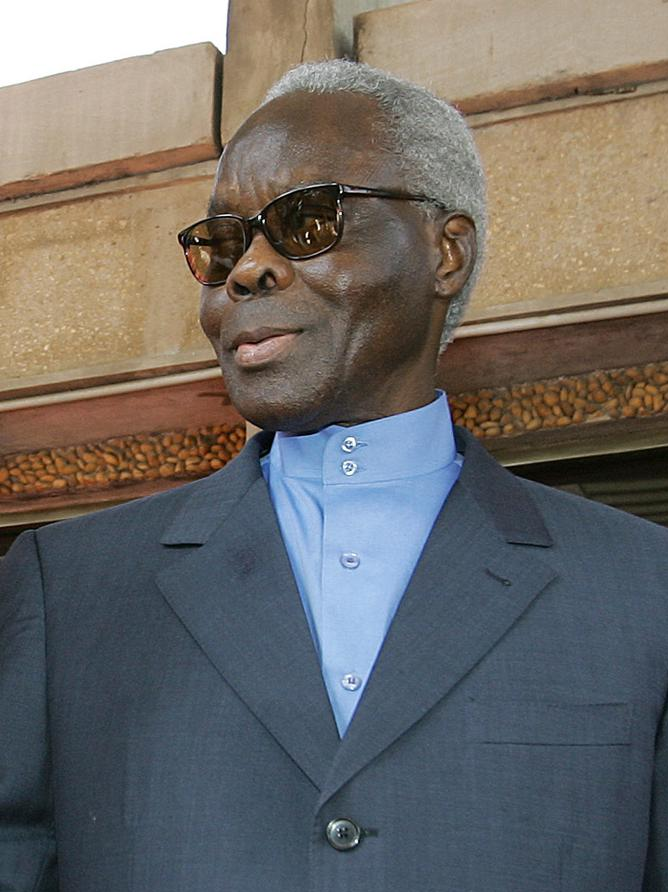
- Kérékou in 2006

President of Benin
- In office 4 April 1996 – 6 April 2006
- Prime Minister: Adrien Houngbédji
- Preceded by: Nicéphore Soglo
- Succeeded by: Thomas Boni Yayi
- In office 26 October 1972 – 4 April 1991
- Prime Minister: Nicéphore Soglo
- Preceded by: Justin Ahomadégbé-Tomêtin
- Succeeded by: Nicéphore Soglo

Personal details
- Born: 2 September 1933 Kouarfa, French Dahomey
- Died: 14 October 2015 (aged 82) Cotonou, Benin
- Party: Action Front for Renewal and Development
- Other political affiliations: People's Revolutionary Party of Benin (1975–1990)
- Spouse(s): Symphorose Béatrice Lakoussan (divorced); Marguerite Kérékou
- Nickname: The Chameleon

Mathieu Kérékou (French pronunciation: [ma.tjø ke.ʁe.ku]; 2 September 1933 – 14 October 2015) was a Beninese politician and revolutionary who served as president of the People's Republic of Benin from 1972 to 1991 and the Republic of Benin from 1996 to 2006.

After seizing power in a military coup, he ruled the country for 18 years under an officially Marxist–Leninist ideology, before he was stripped of his powers by the National Conference of 1990. He was defeated in the 1991 presidential election but was returned to the presidency in the 1996 election and controversially re-elected in 2001.

== Military background ==
Kérékou was born in 1933 in Kouarfa village, in north-west French Dahomey. After having studied at military schools in modern-day Mali and Senegal, Kérékou served in the military by joining the French Army in 1960. Following independence, from 1961 to 1963 he was an aide-de-camp to Dahomeyan President Hubert Maga. Following Maurice Kouandété's coup d'état in December 1967, Kérékou, who was his cousin, was made chairman of the Military Revolutionary Council. After Kérékou attended French military schools from 1968 to 1970, Maga made him a major, deputy chief of staff, and commander of the Ouidah paratroop unit.

== 1972 coup and Marxist rule ==
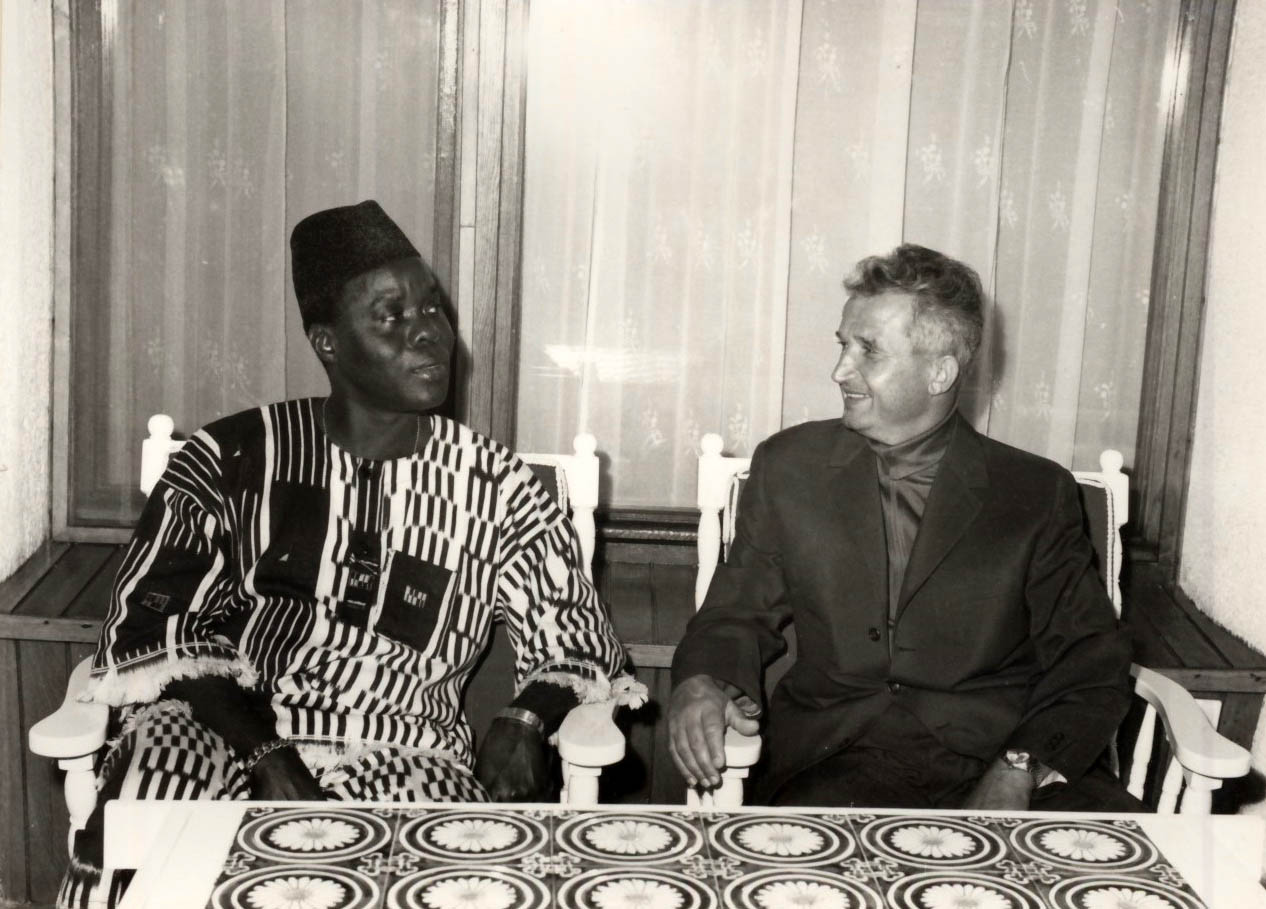
Kérékou with Romanian leader Nicolae Ceaușescu in 1976

Kérékou seized power in Dahomey in a military coup on 26 October 1972, ending a system of government in which three members of a presidential council were to rotate power (earlier in the year Maga had handed over power to Justin Ahomadegbé).

During his first two years in power, Kérékou expressed only nationalism and said that the country's revolution would not "burden itself by copying foreign ideology ... We do not want communism or capitalism or socialism. We have our own Dahomean social and cultural system." On 30 November 1974, however, he announced the adoption of Marxism-Leninism by the state. The country was renamed from the Republic of Dahomey to the People's Republic of Benin a year later; the banks and petroleum industry were nationalized. The People's Revolutionary Party of Benin (Parti de la révolution populaire du Bénin, PRPB) was established as the sole ruling party. In 1980, Kérékou was elected president by the Revolutionary National Assembly; he retired from the army in 1987.

Socialist flag of Benin (1975–1990)

It has been suggested that Kérékou's move to Marxism-Leninism was motivated mainly by pragmatic considerations, and that Kérékou himself was not actually a leftist radical; the new ideology offered a means of legitimization, a way of distinguishing the new regime from those that had preceded it, and was based on broader unifying principles than the politics of ethnicity. Kérékou's regime initially included officers from both the north and south of the country, but as the years passed, the northerners (like Kérékou himself) became clearly dominant, undermining the idea that the regime was not based on ethnicity. By officially adopting Marxism-Leninism, Kérékou may also have wanted to win the support of the country's leftists.

Kérékou's regime was rigid and vigorous in pursuing its newly adopted ideological goals from the mid-1970s to the late 1970s. In 1974, under the influence of young revolutionaries - the "Ligueurs" - the government embarked on a socialist program: nationalization of strategic sectors of the economy, reform of the education system, establishment of agricultural cooperatives and new local government structures, and a campaign to eradicate "feudal forces" including tribalism. Beginning in the late 1970s, the regime jettisoned much of its radicalism and settled onto a more moderately socialist course as Kérékou consolidated his personal control.

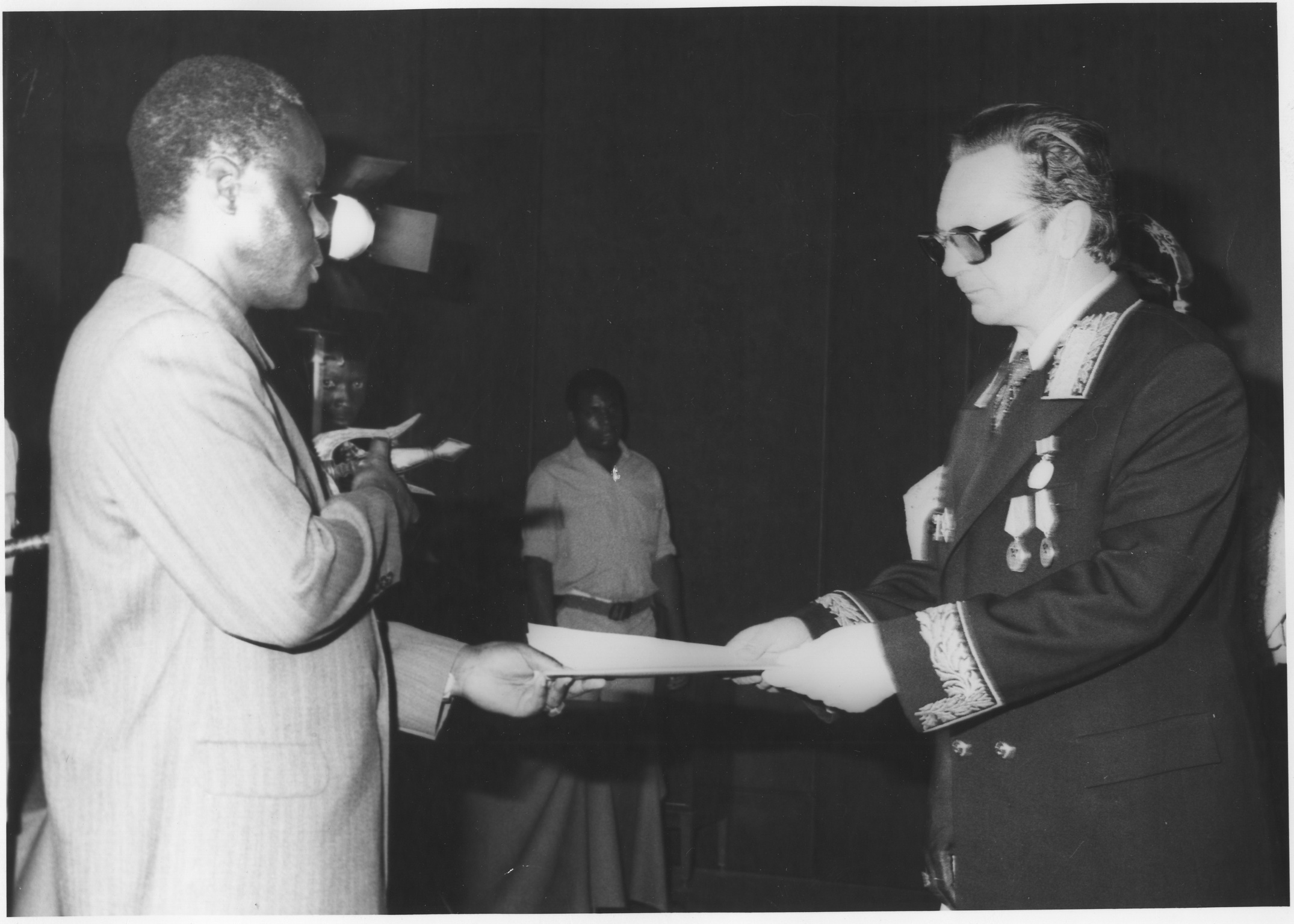
USSR ambassador to Benin Vitaly Agapov presents his letter of credence to Mathieu Kérékou, May 1979.

Its relations with France and other African governments in the region deteriorated because of the Marxism claimed by the Beninese regime and the support offered to the Polisario Front for the liberation of Western Sahara. The French government of Valéry Giscard d'Estaing feared the spread of Marxism in West Africa and decided to react. He was joined by Félix Houphouet-Boigny (Ivory Coast), Gnassingbé Eyadéma (Togo), Joseph-Désiré Mobutu (Zaire) and Hassan II (Morocco), who, in addition to the diplomatic isolation and attempts to destabilize Benin economically, decided to organize an attempted coup d'état. This was Operation Shrimp, entrusted to the French mercenary Bob Denard, on 17 January 1977, but it failed completely. He also campaigned against Vodun, which he considered backward, although at the same time, he retained the services of marabouts.

It was hoped that the nationalizations of the 1970s would help develop the economy, but it remained in a very poor condition. Kérékou began reversing course in the early 1980s, closing down numerous state-run companies and attempting to attract foreign investment. He also accepted an IMF structural readjustment program in 1989, agreeing to austerity measures that severely cut state expenditure. The economic situation continued to worsen during the 1980s, provoking widespread unrest in 1989. A student strike began in January of that year; subsequently, strikes among various elements of society increased in frequency, and the nature of their demands grew broader: whereas initially they had focused on economic issues such as salary arrears, this progressed to include demands for political reform.

== Transition to multi-party ==
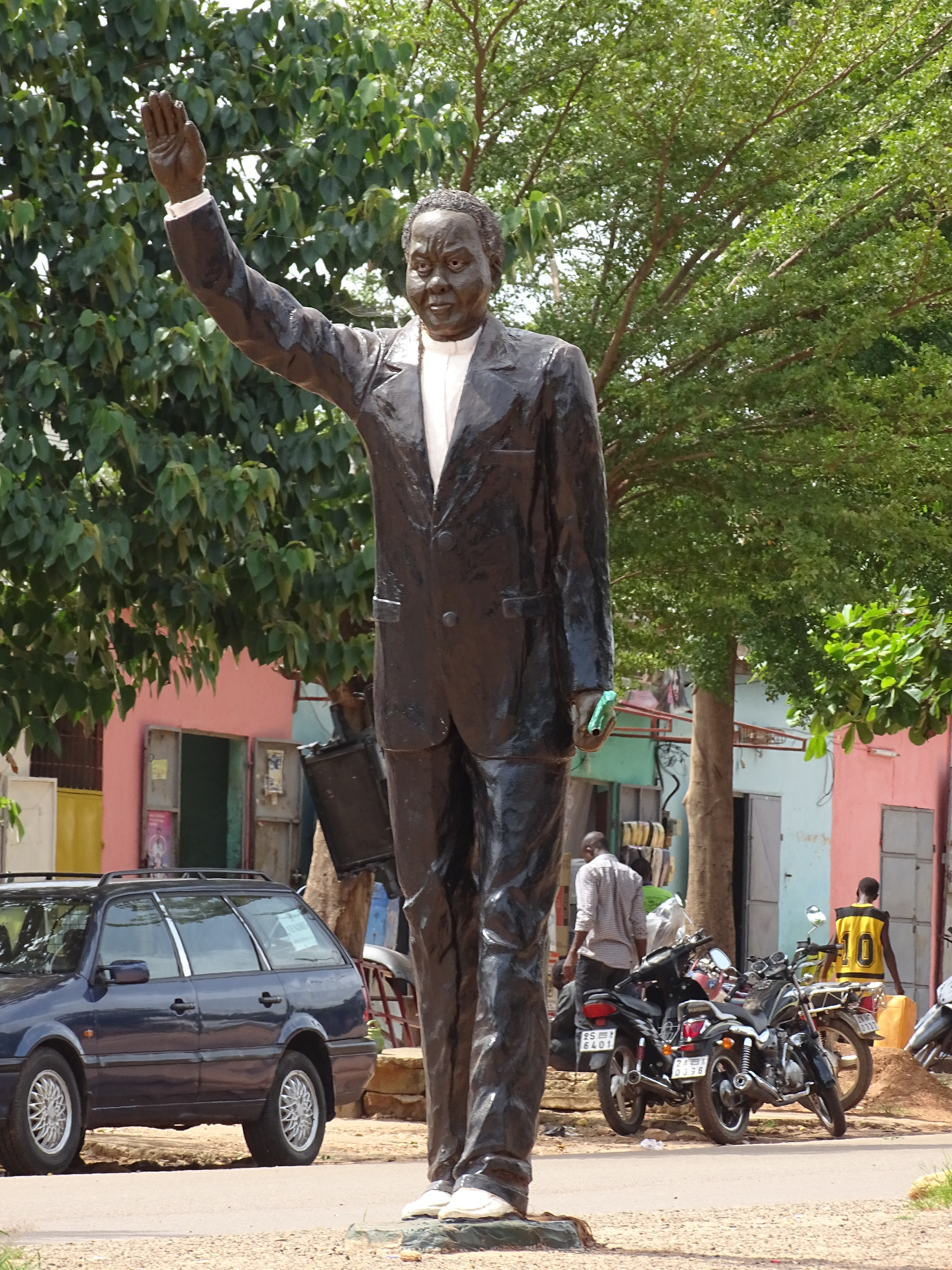
Kérékou's statue in Kouarfa

In the period of reforms towards multiparty democracy in Africa at the beginning of the 1990s, Benin moved onto this path early, with Kérékou being forced to make concessions to popular discontent. Benin's early and relatively smooth transition may be attributed to the particularly dismal economic situation in the country, which seemed to preclude any alternative. Amid increasing unrest, Kérékou was re-elected as president by the National Assembly in August 1989, but in December 1989 Marxism-Leninism was dropped as the state ideology, and a national conference was held in February 1990. The conference turned out to be hostile to Kérékou and declared its own sovereignty; despite the objections of some of his officers to this turn of events, Kérékou did not act against the conference, although he labelled the conference's declaration of sovereignty a "civilian coup". During the transition that followed, Kérékou remained president but lost most of his power.

During the 1990 National Conference, which was nationally televised, Kérékou spoke to the Archbishop of Cotonou, Isidore de Souza, confessing guilt and begging forgiveness for the flaws of his regime. An observer described it as a "remarkable piece of political theater", full of cultural symbolism and significance; in effect, Kérékou was seeking forgiveness from his people. Such a gesture, so unusual for the African leaders of the time, could have fatally weakened Kérékou's political standing, but he performed the gesture in such a way that, far from ending his political career, it instead served to symbolically redeem him and facilitate his political rehabilitation, while also "securing him immunity from prosecution". Kérékou shrewdly utilized the timing and setting: "Culturally as well as theologically it was impossible to refuse forgiveness on these terms."

World Bank economist Nicéphore Soglo, chosen as prime minister by the conference, took office in March, and a new constitution was approved in a December 1990 referendum. Multi-party elections were held in March 1991, which Kérékou lost, obtaining only about 32% of the vote in the second round against Prime Minister Soglo; while he won very large vote percentages in the north, in the rest of the country he found little support. Kérékou was thus the first mainland African president to lose power through a popular election. He apologized for "deplorable and regrettable incidents" that occurred during his rule.

After losing the election in March 1991, Kérékou left the political scene and "withdrew to total silence", another move that was interpreted as penitential.

== 1996 presidential election ==
Kérékou reclaimed the presidency in the March 1996 election. Soglo's economic reforms and his alleged dictatorial tendencies had caused his popularity to suffer. Although Kérékou received fewer votes than Soglo in the first round, he then defeated Soglo in the second round, taking 52.5% of the vote. Kérékou was backed in the second round by third place candidate Adrien Houngbédji and fourth place candidate Bruno Amoussou; as in 1991, Kérékou received very strong support from northern voters, but he also improved his performance in the south. Soglo alleged fraud, but this was rejected by the Constitutional Court, which confirmed Kérékou's victory. When taking the oath of office, Kérékou left out a portion that referred to the "spirits of the ancestors" because he had become a born-again Christian after his defeat by Soglo. He was subsequently forced to retake the oath including the reference to spirits.

== Disputed re-election, 2001 ==
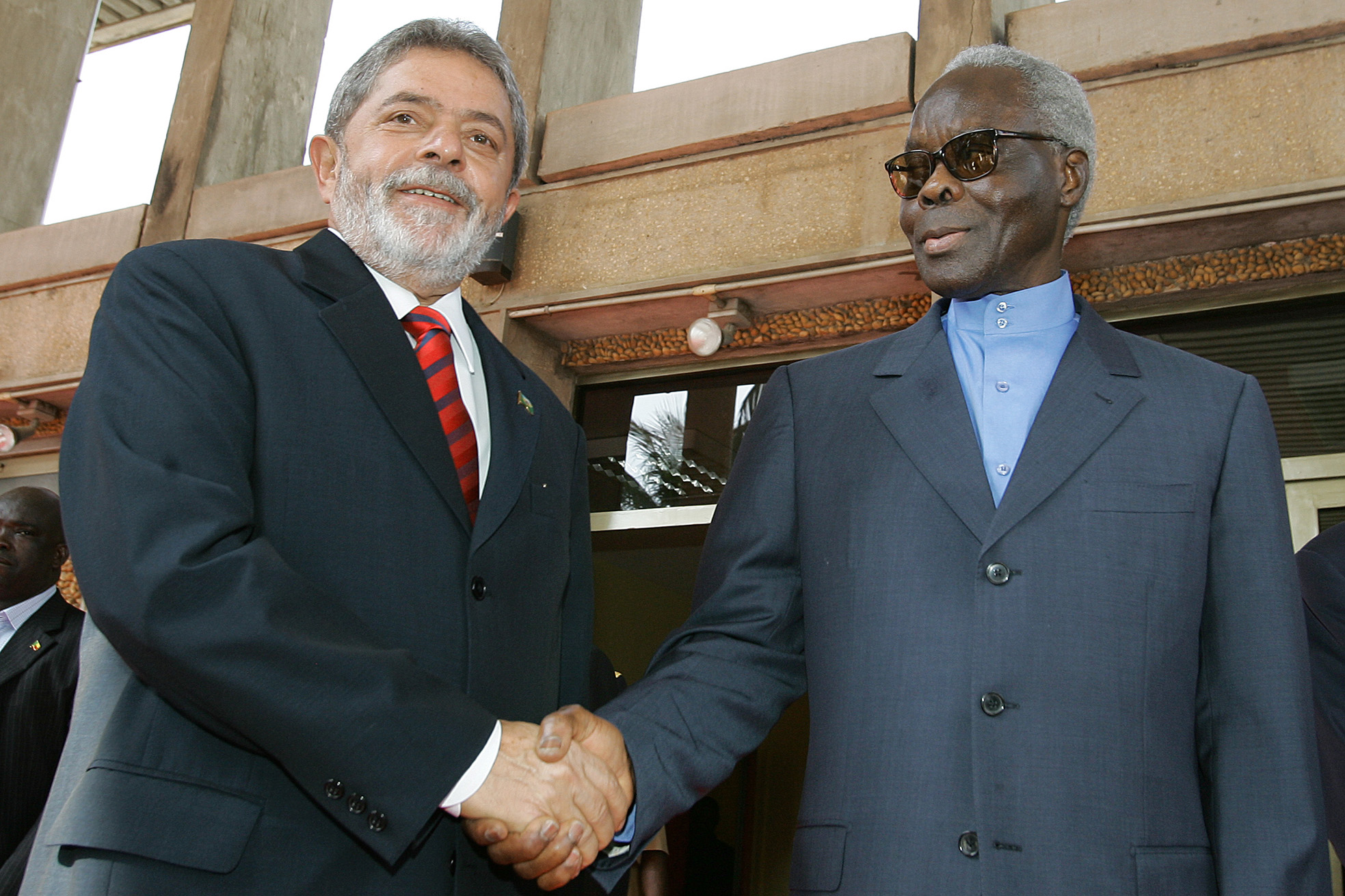
Brazilian President Lula is received by Mathieu Kérékou.

Kérékou was re-elected for a second five-year term in the March 2001 presidential election under controversial circumstances. In the first round he took 45.4% of the vote; Soglo, who took second place, and parliament speaker Houngbédji, who took third, both refused to participate in the second round, alleging fraud and saying that they did not want to legitimize the vote by participating in it. This left the fourth-place finisher, Amoussou, to face Kérékou in the run-off, and Kérékou easily won with 83.6% of the vote. It was subsequently discovered that the American corporation Titan gave more than two million dollars to Kérékou's re-election campaign as a bribe.

During Kérékou's second period in office his government followed a liberal economic path. The period also saw Benin take part in international peacekeeping missions in other African states.

Kérékou was barred from running again in 2006 on two counts. The constitution not only stipulated an absolute two-term limit, but also required that presidential candidates be younger than 70; he turned 70 in 2003, during his second term. Kérékou said in July 2005 that he would not attempt to amend the constitution to allow him to run for a third term. "If you don't leave power," he said, "power will leave you." There was, however, speculation that he had wanted it to be changed, but faced too much opposition.

On 5 March 2006, voters went to the polls to decide who would succeed Kérékou as President of Benin. Yayi Boni defeated Adrien Houngbédji in a run-off vote on 19 March, and Kérékou left office at the end of his term, at midnight on 6 April 2006.

== Religion and symbolism ==
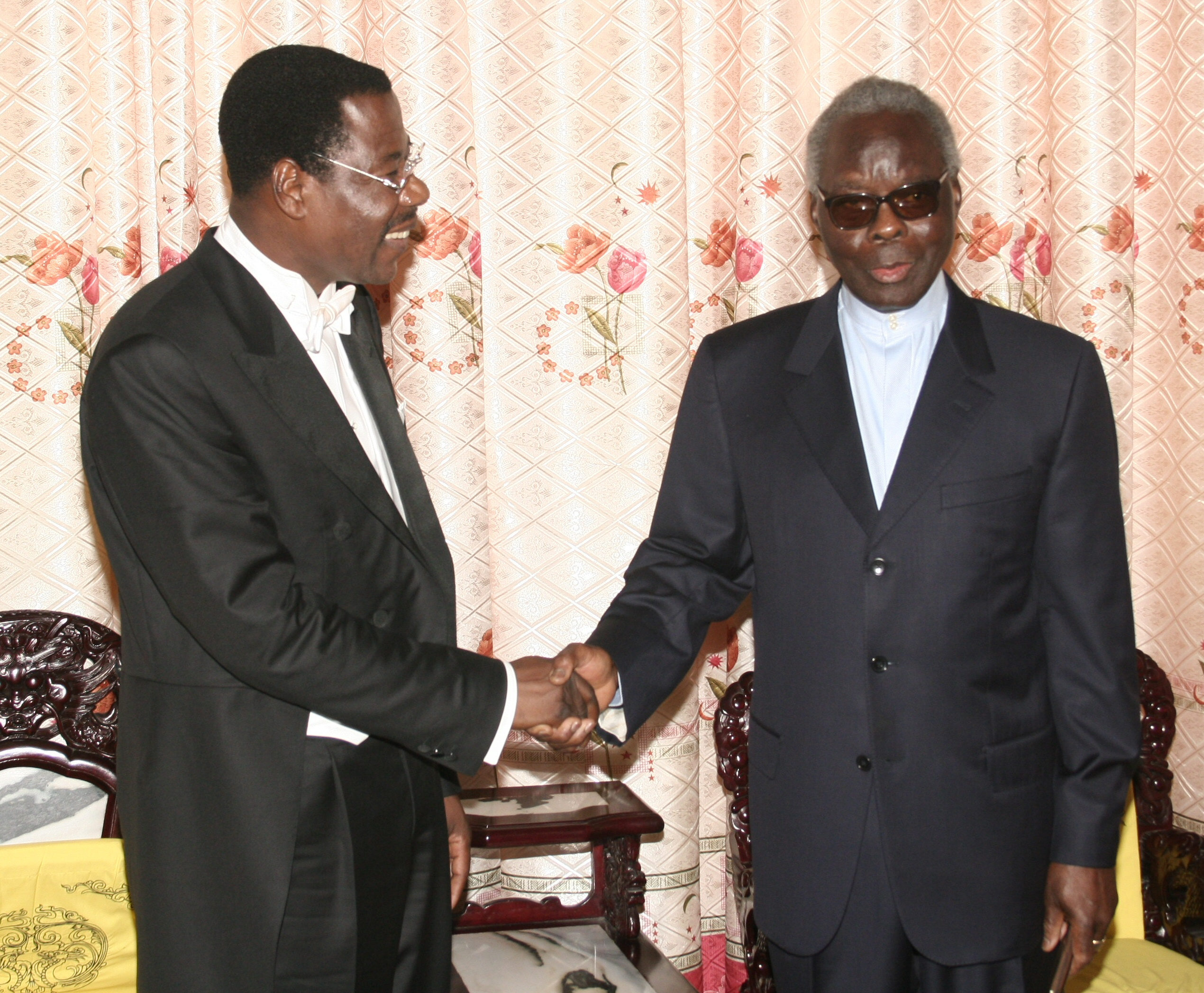
Thomas Boni Yayi congratulated by former president Mathieu Kérékou during the handing over of power ceremony in 2006

Born and baptized in the Catholic faith, although he was a lapsed adherent, Kérékou allegedly converted to Islam in 1980 while on a visit to Libya, and changed his first name to Ahmed, but he later returned to the use of the name Mathieu. This alleged conversion may have been designed to please the Libyan leader Muammar Gaddafi and obtain financial and military support. Alternatively, the conversion story may have been a rumor planted by some of his opponents in order to destabilize his regime. He subsequently became a born-again Christian. Some Vodun believers in Benin regarded him as having magical powers, explaining his ability to survive repeated coup attempts during his military rule.

Nicknamed "the chameleon" from an early point in his career, Kérékou's motto was "the branch will not break in the arms of the chameleon". The nickname and motto he adopted were full of cultural symbolism, articulating and projecting his power and ability. Unlike some past rulers who had adopted animal symbolism intending to project a violent, warlike sense of power, Kérékou's symbolic animal suggested skill and cleverness; his motto suggested that he would keep the branch from breaking, but implicitly warned of what could happen to "the branch" if it was not "in the arms of the chameleon"—political chaos. To some, his nickname seemed particularly apt as he successfully adapted himself to a new political climate and neoliberal economic policies in the 1990s.

In 1999, he visited Baltimore and apologized on behalf of Benin's role in the Atlantic slave trade.

He used the campaign slogan, "Experience in the service of youth."

== Retirement and death ==
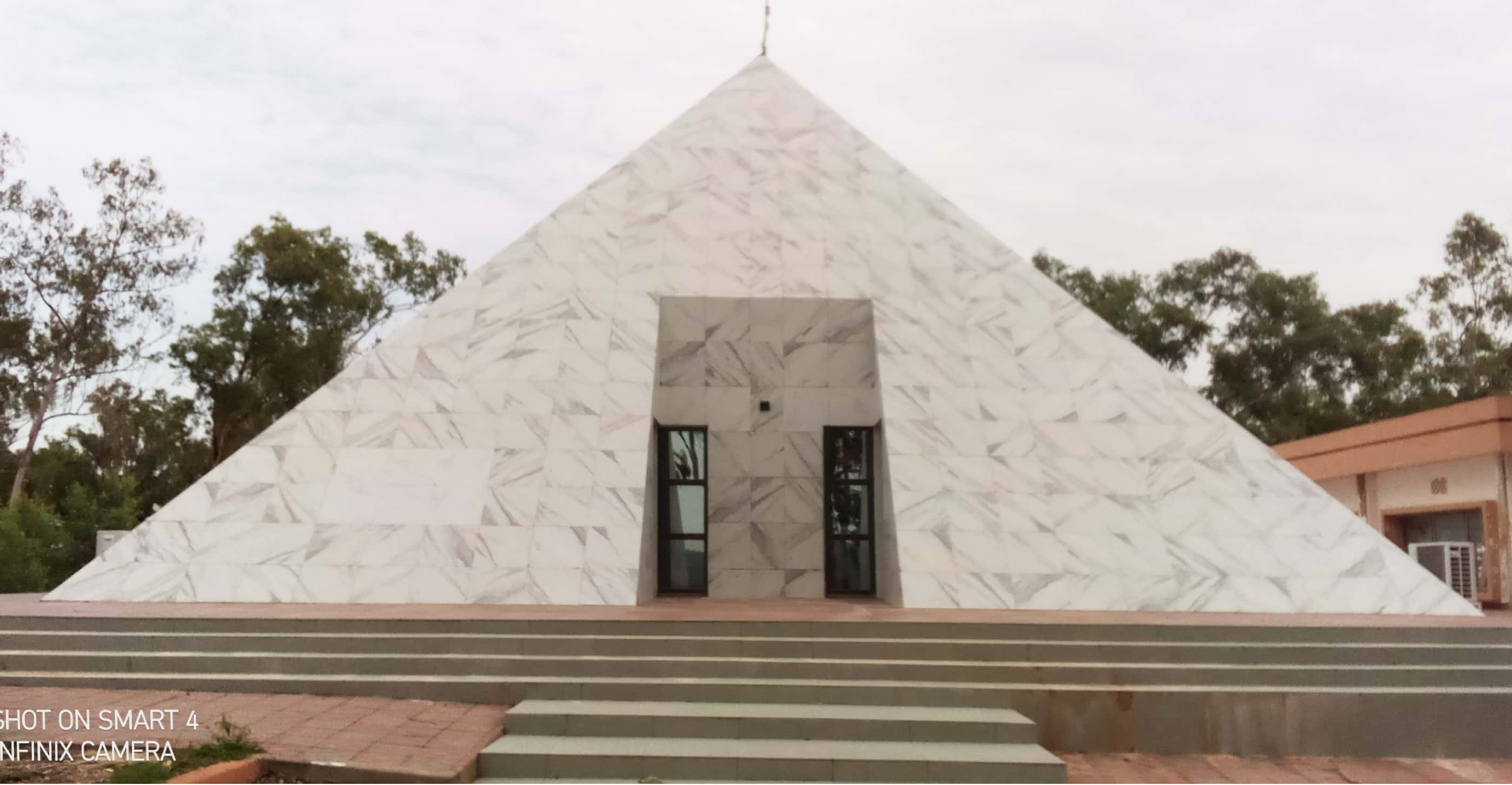
Mathieu Kerekou's mausoleum in Natitingou, Benin.

After leaving office in 2006, Kérékou stayed out of politics and spent time at his homes in Cotonou and Natitingou in northwestern Benin, his native region. He suffered a health crisis in 2014 and was taken to Paris for treatment. Although he recovered, he continued to suffer health problems, and he died in Benin on 14 October 2015 at the age of 82. His death was announced in a statement by President Thomas Boni Yayi. No cause of death was stated. A week of national mourning was declared.
