= 1998 United Kingdom local elections =

- 7 May 1998

All 32 London boroughs, all 36 metropolitan boroughs, 10 out of 46 unitary authorities and 88 out of 238 English districts
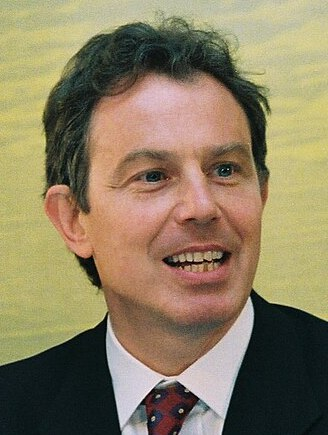

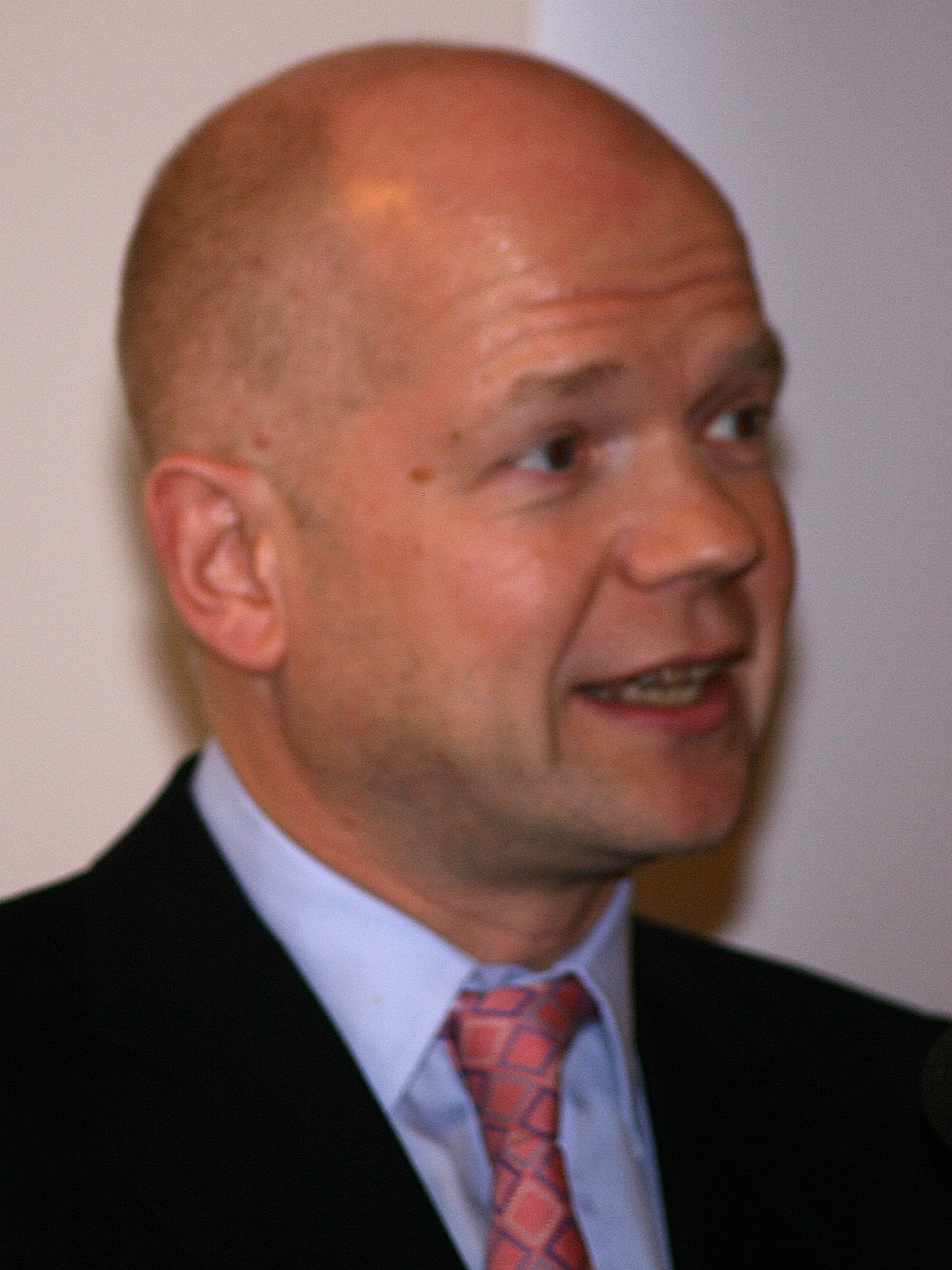

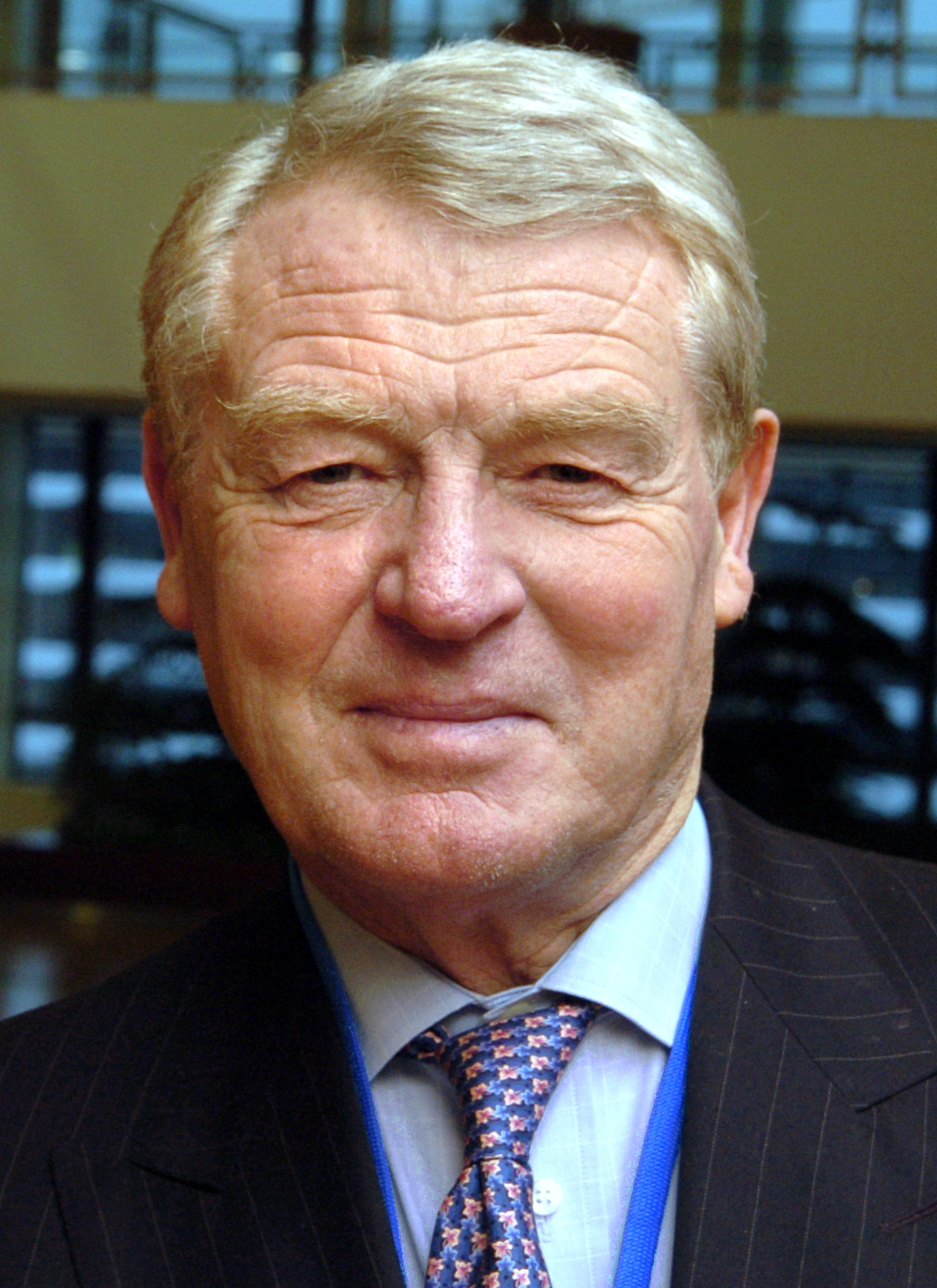
	Majority party	Minority party	Third party
Leader	Tony Blair	William Hague	Paddy Ashdown
Party	Labour	Conservative	Liberal Democrats
Leader since	21 July 1994	19 June 1997	16 July 1988
Percentage	38%	32%	25%
Councils	94	8	14
Councils +/-	▲2	▲1	▼7
Councillors	2,240	1,085	853
Councillors +/-	▼88	▲256	▼114
- Colours denote the winning party, as shown in the table of results.

The 1998 United Kingdom local elections were held on Thursday 7 May 1998. All London borough council seats were elected as well a third of the seats on each of the Metropolitan Boroughs. Some unitary authorities and District councils also had elections. There were no local elections in Scotland, Wales or Northern Ireland.

These elections took place on the same day as the referendum on establishing the Greater London Authority.

The governing Labour Party, contesting its first national elections since returning to government 12 months previously, enjoyed great success, now having control of 94 councils, with the second placed Liberal Democrats now controlling 14 and the opposition Conservatives (now led by William Hague) a mere eight.

A by-election for the European Parliament was also held in the Yorkshire South constituency; Labour retained the seat.

== Results ==
Party	Councils				Councillors			
Party	Gain	Loss	Change	Total	Gain	Loss	Change	Total
Labour			▲+2	94			▼-88	2,240
Liberal Democrats			▼-7	14			▼-114	853
Conservative			▲+1	8			▲+256	1,085
Other	0	0	0	0			▼-57	146
No overall control			▲+4	50	—	—	—	—

== England ==
=== London boroughs ===
In all 32 London boroughs the whole council was up for election.

Council	Previous control	Result	Details
Barking and Dagenham	Labour	Labour hold	Details
Barnet	No overall control	No overall control hold	Details
Bexley	No overall control	No overall control hold	Details
Brent	No overall control	Labour gain	Details
Bromley	Conservative	No overall control gain	Details
Camden	Labour	Labour hold	Details
Croydon	Labour	Labour hold	Details
Ealing	Labour	Labour hold	Details
Enfield	Labour	Labour hold	Details
Greenwich	Labour	Labour hold	Details
Hackney	No overall control	No overall control hold	Details
Hammersmith and Fulham	Labour	Labour hold	Details
Haringey	Labour	Labour hold	Details
Harrow	No overall control	Labour gain	Details
Havering	No overall control	No overall control hold	Details
Hillingdon	Labour	No overall control gain	Details
Hounslow	Labour	Labour hold	Details
Islington	Labour	No overall control gain	Details
Kensington and Chelsea	Conservative	Conservative hold	Details
Kingston upon Thames	Liberal Democrats	No overall control gain	Details
Lambeth	No overall control	Labour gain	Details
Lewisham	Labour	Labour hold	Details
Merton	Labour	Labour hold	Details
Newham	Labour	Labour hold	Details
Redbridge	No overall control	No overall control hold	Details
Richmond upon Thames	Liberal Democrats	Liberal Democrats hold	Details
Southwark	Labour	Labour hold	Details
Sutton	Liberal Democrats	Liberal Democrats hold	Details
Tower Hamlets	Labour	Labour hold	Details
Waltham Forest	No overall control	Labour gain	Details
Wandsworth	Conservative	Conservative hold	Details
Westminster	Conservative	Conservative hold	Details

=== Metropolitan boroughs ===
All 36 English Metropolitan borough councils had one third of their seats up for election.

Council	Previous control	Result	Details
Barnsley	Labour	Labour hold	Details
Birmingham	Labour	Labour hold	Details
Bolton	Labour	Labour hold	Details
Bradford	Labour	Labour hold	Details
Bury	Labour	Labour hold	Details
Calderdale	Labour	Labour hold	Details
Coventry	Labour	Labour hold	Details
Doncaster	Labour	Labour hold	Details
Dudley	Labour	Labour hold	Details
Gateshead	Labour	Labour hold	Details
Kirklees	Labour	Labour hold	Details
Knowsley	Labour	Labour hold	Details
Leeds	Labour	Labour hold	Details
Liverpool	Labour	Liberal Democrats gain	Details
Manchester	Labour	Labour hold	Details
Newcastle upon Tyne	Labour	Labour hold	Details
North Tyneside	Labour	Labour hold	Details
Oldham	Labour	Labour hold	Details
Rochdale	Labour	Labour hold	Details
Rotherham	Labour	Labour hold	Details
Salford	Labour	Labour hold	Details
Sandwell	Labour	Labour hold	Details
Sefton	No overall control	No overall control hold	Details
Sheffield	Labour	Labour hold	Details
Solihull	No overall control	No overall control hold	Details
South Tyneside	Labour	Labour hold	Details
St Helens	Labour	Labour hold	Details
Stockport	No overall control	No overall control hold	Details
Sunderland	Labour	Labour hold	Details
Tameside	Labour	Labour hold	Details
Trafford	Labour	Labour hold	Details
Wakefield	Labour	Labour hold	Details
Walsall	No overall control	No overall control hold	Details
Wigan	Labour	Labour hold	Details
Wirral	Labour	Labour hold	Details
Wolverhampton	Labour	Labour hold	Details

=== Unitary authorities ===
==== Whole council ====
The whole of the Isle of Wight council was up for election.

Council	Previous control	Result	Details
Isle of Wight	Liberal Democrats	No overall control gain	Details

==== Third of council ====
In 9 English Unitary authorities one third of the council was up for election.

Council	Previous control	Result	Details
Bristol	Labour	Labour hold	Details
Derby	Labour	Labour hold	Details
Hartlepool	Labour	Labour hold	Details
Kingston upon Hull	Labour	Labour hold	Details
Milton Keynes	Labour	Labour hold	Details
Portsmouth	Labour	Labour hold	Details
Southampton	Labour	Labour hold	Details
Stoke-on-Trent	Labour	Labour hold	Details
Swindon	Labour	Labour hold	Details

=== District councils ===
In 88 English district authorities one third of the council was up for election.

Council	Previous control	Result	Details
Adur	Liberal Democrats	Liberal Democrats hold	Details
Amber Valley	Labour	Labour hold	Details
Barrow-in-Furness	Labour	Labour hold	Details
Basildon	Labour	Labour hold	Details
Basingstoke and Deane	No overall control	No overall control hold	Details
Bassetlaw	Labour	Labour hold	Details
Bedford	No overall control	No overall control hold	Details
Brentwood	Liberal Democrats	Liberal Democrats hold	Details
Broadland	No overall control	No overall control hold	Details
Broxbourne	Conservative	Conservative hold	Details
Burnley	Labour	Labour hold	Details
Cambridge	Labour	No overall control gain	Details
Cannock Chase	Labour	Labour hold	Details
Carlisle	Labour	Labour hold	Details
Cheltenham	Liberal Democrats	Liberal Democrats hold	Details
Cherwell	No overall control	No overall control hold	Details
Chester	No overall control	No overall control hold	Details
Chorley	Labour	Labour hold	Details
Colchester	Liberal Democrats	No overall control gain	Details
Congleton	Liberal Democrats	Liberal Democrats hold	Details
Craven	Liberal Democrats	No overall control gain	Details
Crawley	Labour	Labour hold	Details
Crewe and Nantwich	Labour	Labour hold	Details
Daventry	No overall control	No overall control hold	Details
Eastbourne	Liberal Democrats	Liberal Democrats hold	Details
Eastleigh	Liberal Democrats	Liberal Democrats hold	Details
Ellesmere Port and Neston	Labour	Labour hold	Details
Elmbridge	No overall control	No overall control hold	Details
Epping Forest	No overall control	No overall control hold	Details
Exeter	Labour	Labour hold	Details
Fareham	No overall control	No overall control hold	Details
Gloucester ‡	Labour	Labour hold	Details
Gosport	No overall control	No overall control hold	Details
Great Yarmouth	Labour	Labour hold	Details
Harlow	Labour	Labour hold	Details
Harrogate	Liberal Democrats	Liberal Democrats hold	Details
Hart	No overall control	No overall control hold	Details
Hastings	Liberal Democrats	Labour gain	Details
Havant	No overall control	No overall control hold	Details
Hertsmere	Labour	Labour hold	Details
Huntingdonshire	Conservative	Conservative hold	Details
Hyndburn	Labour	Labour hold	Details
Ipswich	Labour	Labour hold	Details
Lincoln	Labour	Labour hold	Details
Macclesfield	Conservative	Conservative hold	Details
Maidstone	No overall control	No overall control hold	Details
Mole Valley	No overall control	No overall control hold	Details
Newcastle-under-Lyme	Labour	Labour hold	Details
North Hertfordshire	Labour	Labour hold	Details
Norwich	Labour	Labour hold	Details
Nuneaton and Bedworth	Labour	Labour hold	Details
Oxford	Labour	Labour hold	Details
Pendle	Liberal Democrats	Liberal Democrats hold	Details
Penwith	No overall control	No overall control hold	Details
Preston	Labour	Labour hold	Details
Purbeck	No overall control	No overall control hold	Details
Redditch	Labour	Labour hold	Details
Reigate and Banstead	No overall control	No overall control hold	Details
Rochford	Liberal Democrats	No overall control gain	Details
Rossendale	Labour	Labour hold	Details
Rugby	No overall control	No overall control hold	Details
Runnymede	No overall control	Conservative gain	Details
Rushmoor	No overall control	No overall control hold	Details
Shrewsbury and Atcham	No overall control	No overall control hold	Details
South Bedfordshire	No overall control	No overall control hold	Details
South Cambridgeshire	No overall control	No overall control hold	Details
South Lakeland	No overall control	No overall control hold	Details
St Albans	Liberal Democrats	Liberal Democrats hold	Details
Stevenage	Labour	Labour hold	Details
Stratford-on-Avon	No overall control	No overall control hold	Details
Stroud	No overall control	No overall control hold	Details
Swale	No overall control	No overall control hold	Details
Tamworth	Labour	Labour hold	Details
Tandridge	No overall control	No overall control hold	Details
Three Rivers	No overall control	No overall control hold	Details
Tunbridge Wells	No overall control	Conservative gain	Details
Watford	Labour	Labour hold	Details
Waveney	Labour	Labour hold	Details
Welwyn Hatfield	Labour	Labour hold	Details
West Lancashire	Labour	Labour hold	Details
West Lindsey	Liberal Democrats	No overall control gain	Details
West Oxfordshire	No overall control	No overall control hold	Details
Weymouth and Portland	No overall control	No overall control hold	Details
Winchester	Liberal Democrats	Liberal Democrats hold	Details
Woking	Liberal Democrats	No overall control gain	Details
Worcester	Labour	Labour hold	Details
Worthing	Liberal Democrats	Liberal Democrats hold	Details
Wyre Forest	Labour	Labour hold	Details

‡ New ward boundaries
