= 1998 Tunbridge Wells Borough Council election =

1998 UK local government election

The 1998 Tunbridge Wells Borough Council election took place on 7 May 1998 to elect members of Tunbridge Wells Borough Council in Kent, England. One third of the council was up for election and the Conservative party gained overall control of the council from no overall control.

After the election, the composition of the council was

- Conservative 27
- Liberal Democrat 12
- Labour 7
- Independent 2

== Campaign ==
Before the election the council was run by the Liberal Democrats after depriving the Conservatives of a majority in 1995 and winning majority control in 1996. However the Conservatives were optimistic of making gains as they were no longer in government nationally and after some Liberal Democrat councillors had defected. The Liberal Democrats however were confident of continuing to run the council, with the national party leader Paddy Ashdown visiting the area to campaign for the party. Meanwhile, Labour were not seen as being important in the election, with the party not contesting all of the wards.

Issues in the election included plans for traffic calming and to widen the A21. The Liberal Democrat council's plans to create cycle and bus lanes by using part of the common were attacked by the Conservatives.

== Results ==
The results saw the Conservatives win control of the council after winning all 12 seats that the Liberal Democrats had been defending. The victory was seen as being symbolic for the Conservatives in the 1998 local elections as an area which they had lost at the height of unpopularity in the mid-1990s.

Tunbridge Wells local election result 1998
Party	Seats	Gains	Losses	Net gain/loss	Seats %	Votes %	Votes	+/−
Conservative	15			+12	83.3			
Labour	2			0	11.1			
Independent	1			0	5.6			
Liberal Democrats	0			-12	0			
