= 1998 Hart District Council election =

1998 UK local government election

The 1998 Hart Council election took place on 7 May 1998 to elect members of Hart District Council in Hampshire, England. One third of the council was up for election and the council stayed under no overall control.

After the election, the composition of the council was:

- Liberal Democrat 15
- Conservative 14
- Independent 6

== Election result ==
Hart local election result 1998
Party	Seats	Gains	Losses	Net gain/loss	Seats %	Votes %	Votes	+/−
Liberal Democrats	5			0	45.5	30.3	4,045	
Conservative	3			+1	27.3	36.0	4,808	
Independent	3			-1	27.3	25.0	3,332	
Labour	0			0	0.0	8.7	1,160	

== Ward results ==
Blackwater and Hawley
Party	Candidate	Votes	%	±%
Liberal Democrats	Brian Blewett	527	49.2	
Conservative	John Twemlow	432	40.3	
Labour	Pauline Billman	113	10.5	
Majority		95	8.9	
Turnout		1,072		

Church Crookham
Party	Candidate	Votes	%	±%
Liberal Democrats	Heather Shearer	738	44.8	
Conservative	Rosemary Feltham	727	44.1	
Labour	Hugh Meredith	183	11.1	
Majority		11	0.7	
Turnout		1,648		

Crondall
Party	Candidate	Votes	%	±%
Conservative	Norman Lambert	741	71.5	
Liberal Democrats	Penelope Wright	190	18.3	
Labour	Alan Partridge	106	10.2	
Majority		551	53.1	
Turnout		1,037		

Fleet Courtmoor
Party	Candidate	Votes	%	±%
Conservative	Colin Hazell	838	60.2	
Independent	Stephen Gorys	404	29.0	
Labour	Janet Carrier	150	10.8	
Majority		434	31.2	
Turnout		1,392		

Fleet Pondtail
Party	Candidate	Votes	%	±%
Independent	Sharyn Wheale	944	50.8	
Conservative	Brian Goddard	727	39.1	
Labour	Peter Cotton	188	10.1	
Majority		217	11.7	
Turnout		1,859		

Fleet West
Party	Candidate	Votes	%	±%
Ind. Conservative	Peter Shoesmith	975	66.4	
Liberal Democrats	Richard Robinson	326	22.2	
Labour	Shirley Dearman	168	11.4	
Majority		649	44.2	
Turnout		1,469		

Frogmore and Darby Green
Party	Candidate	Votes	%	±%
Liberal Democrats	Vivien Street	652	66.5	
Conservative	Caryl Bromhead	192	19.6	
Labour	John Davies	136	13.9	
Majority		460	46.9	
Turnout		980		

Hartley Wintney
Party	Candidate	Votes	%	±%
Independent	Susan Band	1,009	86.3	
Liberal Democrats	Anthony Over	160	13.7	
Majority		849	72.6	
Turnout		1,169		

Hook
Party	Candidate	Votes	%	±%
Liberal Democrats	Fergus Kirkham	848	57.2	
Conservative	Andrew Henderson	634	42.8	
Majority		214	14.4	
Turnout		1,482		

Long Sutton
Party	Candidate	Votes	%	±%
Conservative	Sarah Wallis	301	69.2	
Liberal Democrats	William Redman	134	30.8	
Majority		167	38.4	
Turnout		435		

Yateley West
Party	Candidate	Votes	%	±%
Liberal Democrats	David Simpson	470	58.6	
Conservative	David Ashworth	216	26.9	
Labour	John Davis	116	14.5	
Majority		254	31.7	
Turnout		802		

Preceded by 1996 Hart Council election	Hart local elections	Succeeded by 1999 Hart Council election
