= 1998 Waveney District Council election =

1998 English local government election

- 7 May 1998

All 48 seats to Waveney District Council 25 seats needed for a majority

	First party	Second party
Party	Labour	Conservative
Seats won	11	2
Seats after	41	3
Seat change	▼3	▲1
Popular vote	10,466	5,360
Percentage	51.3%	26.3%
Swing	▼10.1%	▲2.8%
	Third party	Fourth party
Party	Liberal Democrats	Independent
Seats won	1	2
Seats after	2	2
Seat change	Steady	▲2
Popular vote	2,464	2,101
Percentage	12.1%	10.3%
Swing	▲0.4%	▲6.9%
- Winner of each seat at the 1998 Waveney District Council election.
Control before election
Labour
Control after election
Labour

The 1998 Waveney District Council election took place on 7 May 1998 to elect members of Waveney District Council in Suffolk, England. This was on the same day as other local elections.

One third of the council was up for election and the Labour Party stayed in overall control of the council.

== Summary ==
=== Election result ===
1998 Waveney District Council election
Party	This election			Full council			This election		
Party	Seats	Net	Seats %	Other	Total	Total %	Votes	Votes %	+/−
Labour	11	▼3	68.8	30	41	85.4	10,466	51.3	–10.1
Conservative	2	▲1	12.5	1	3	6.3	5,360	26.3	+2.8
Liberal Democrats	1	Steady	6.3	1	2	4.2	2,464	12.1	+0.4
Independent	2	▲2	12.5	0	2	4.2	2,101	10.3	+6.9

== Ward results ==
Incumbent councillors standing for re-election are marked with an asterisk (*). Changes in seats do not take into account by-elections or defections.

=== Beccles Town ===
Beccles Town
Party	Candidate	Votes	%	±%
Independent	K. Cracknell	978	46.2	
Labour	K. Jenkins*	730	34.5	
Conservative	V. Pulford	231	10.9	
Liberal Democrats	W. Fleetney	178	8.4	
Majority		248	11.7	
Turnout		2,117	35.9	
Registered electors		5,910		
Independent gain from Labour		Swing		

=== Carlton ===
Carlton
Party	Candidate	Votes	%	±%
Labour	D. Gower*	939	56.0	
Conservative	R. Bell	596	35.5	
Liberal Democrats	A. Thomas	142	8.5	
Majority		343	20.5	
Turnout		1,677	25.6	
Registered electors		6,549		
Labour hold		Swing		

=== Gunton ===
Gunton
Party	Candidate	Votes	%	±%
Labour	W. Devereux*	709	48.8	
Conservative	A. Choveaux	602	41.4	
Liberal Democrats	J. Woolley	142	9.8	
Majority		107	7.4	
Turnout		1,453	28.5	
Registered electors		5,108		
Labour hold		Swing		

=== Harbour ===
Harbour
Party	Candidate	Votes	%	±%
Labour	K. Patience	588	67.2	
Conservative	P. Biggs	154	17.6	
Liberal Democrats	L. Batchelor	133	15.2	
Majority		434	49.6	
Turnout		875	21.9	
Registered electors		4,019		
Labour hold		Swing		

=== Kessingland ===
Kessingland
Party	Candidate	Votes	%	±%
Labour	I. Graham	530	57.9	
Conservative	A. Mylan	210	23.0	
Liberal Democrats	C. Faith	175	19.1	
Majority		320	35.0	
Turnout		915	25.4	
Registered electors		3,614		
Labour hold		Swing		

=== Kirkley ===
Kirkley
Party	Candidate	Votes	%	±%
Liberal Democrats	D. Young	715	48.6	
Labour	J. Bellham	619	42.1	
Conservative	M. Reader	138	9.4	
Majority		96	6.5	
Turnout		1,472	33.6	
Registered electors		4,385		
Liberal Democrats hold		Swing		

=== Lothingland ===
Lothingland
Party	Candidate	Votes	%	±%
Labour	B. Hunter*	890	60.5	
Conservative	S. Ames	459	31.2	
Liberal Democrats	A. Tibbitt	122	8.3	
Majority		431	29.3	
Turnout		1,471	30.5	
Registered electors		4,824		
Labour hold		Swing		

=== Mutford ===
Mutford
Party	Candidate	Votes	%	±%
Labour	J. Taylor*	327	57.8	
Conservative	B. Reader	202	35.7	
Liberal Democrats	A. Howe	37	6.5	
Majority		125	22.1	
Turnout		566	38.8	
Registered electors		1,458		
Labour hold		Swing		

=== Normanston ===
Normanston
Party	Candidate	Votes	%	±%
Labour	E. Leverett*	787	77.4	
Conservative	F. Gaimster	135	13.3	
Liberal Democrats	B. Batchelder	95	9.3	
Majority		652	64.1	
Turnout		1,017	23.9	
Registered electors		4,252		
Labour hold		Swing		

=== Oulton Broad ===
Oulton Broad
Party	Candidate	Votes	%	±%
Labour	M. Rodgers*	817	56.1	
Conservative	R. Wallington	462	31.7	
Liberal Democrats	A. Martin	178	12.2	
Majority		355	24.4	
Turnout		1,457	27.3	
Registered electors		5,340		
Labour hold		Swing		

=== Pakefield ===
Pakefield
Party	Candidate	Votes	%	±%
Labour	T. Kelly*	1,043	66.9	
Conservative	E. Torlot	349	22.4	
Liberal Democrats	A. Shepherd	167	10.7	
Majority		694	44.5	
Turnout		1,559	28.5	
Registered electors		5,478		
Labour hold		Swing		

=== South Elmham ===
South Elmham
Party	Candidate	Votes	%	±%
Conservative	M. Rose*	368	61.7	
Labour	A. Fisher	168	28.2	
Liberal Democrats	J. Morgan	60	10.1	
Majority		200	33.6	
Turnout		596	39.6	
Registered electors		1,516		
Conservative hold		Swing		

=== Southwold ===
Southwold
Party	Candidate	Votes	%	±%
Independent	G. Langley	1,123	49.7	
Conservative	C. Pretty	860	38.0	
Labour	C. Scott	278	12.3	
Majority		263	11.7	
Turnout		2,261	44.3	
Registered electors		5,118		
Independent gain from Labour		Swing		

=== St. Margarets ===
St. Margarets
Party	Candidate	Votes	%	±%
Labour	J. Coward	958	71.0	
Conservative	P. Pulford	238	17.6	
Liberal Democrats	G. Haworth	154	11.4	
Majority		720	53.3	
Turnout		1,350	24.5	
Registered electors		5,519		
Labour hold		Swing		

=== Wainford ===
Wainford
Party	Candidate	Votes	%	±%
Conservative	M. Bee	208	47.5	
Labour	S. Robbins	164	37.4	
Liberal Democrats	S. May	66	15.1	
Majority		44	10.0	
Turnout		438	32.6	
Registered electors		1,344		
Conservative gain from Labour		Swing		

=== Whitton ===
Whitton
Party	Candidate	Votes	%	±%
Labour	T. Carter*	919	78.7	
Conservative	B. Bee	148	12.7	
Liberal Democrats	S. Tonge	100	8.6	
Majority		771	66.1	
Turnout		1,167	26.9	
Registered electors		4,334		
Labour hold		Swing		

== By-elections ==
=== Gunton ===
Gunton by-election: 19 February 1998
Party	Candidate	Votes	%	±%
Labour		653	48.2	
Conservative		541	40.0	
Liberal Democrats		160	11.8	
Majority		112	8.2	
Turnout		1,354	26.6	
Registered electors		5,090		
Labour hold		Swing		
