= 1998 Stroud District Council election =

1998 UK local government election

The 1998 Stroud Council election took place on 7 May 1998 to elect members of Stroud District Council in Gloucestershire, England. One third of the council was up for election and the council stayed under no overall control.

After the election, the composition of the council was

- Labour 26
- Conservative 10
- Liberal Democrat 9
- Independent 6
- Green 4

== Background ==
Before the election the Labour party ran the council, but the party had recently lost its one-seat overall majority after a vacancy in a Labour seat. 19 seats were contested in the election with Labour defending 10 seats, the Liberal Democrats 5, Green party 2 and independents 2.

== Election result ==
The results saw no party win a majority on the council after Labour lost 1 seat to the Conservatives and 1 seat to an independent.

Stroud local election result 1998
Party	Seats	Gains	Losses	Net gain/loss	Seats %	Votes %	Votes	+/−
Labour	8			-2	42.1			
Conservative	3			+3	15.8			
Liberal Democrats	3			-2	15.8			
Independent	3			+1	15.8			
Green	2			0	10.5			
