= 1998 Three Rivers District Council election =

1998 UK local government election

Elections to Three Rivers Council were held on 7 May 1998. One third of the council was up for election and the council stayed under no overall control.

After the election, the composition of the council was:

- Liberal Democrat 23
- Conservative 17
- Labour 8

== Election result ==
Three Rivers local election result 1998
Party	Seats	Gains	Losses	Net gain/loss	Seats %	Votes %	Votes	+/−
Liberal Democrats	9			0	52.9			
Conservative	6			0	35.3			
Labour	2			0	11.8			
