= 1998 Watford Borough Council election =

1998 UK local government election

Watford, a city in England, held its 1998 Watford Borough Council elections on 7 May. One third of the council was up for election and the Labour party stayed in overall control of the council.

== Election result ==
1998 Watford Borough Council election
Party	This election			Full council			This election		
Party	Seats	Net	Seats %	Other	Total	Total %	Votes	Votes %	+/−
Labour	7	Steady	53.8	14	21	58.3	7,570	39.1	-3.6
Liberal Democrats	3	Steady	23.1	6	9	25.0	6,282	32.4	-1.0
Conservative	3	Steady	23.1	3	6	16.7	5,514	28.5	+4.7

== Ward results ==
=== Callowland ===
Callowland
Party	Candidate	Votes	%	±%
Labour	F. Hodgson	479	55.7	−7.5
Liberal Democrats	A. Canning	221	25.7	+2.7
Conservative	M. Taylor	160	18.6	+4.8
Majority			30.0	
Turnout		860	21.5	
Labour hold		Swing	▼5.1	

=== Central ===
Central
Party	Candidate	Votes	%	±%
Labour	R. Atkin	808	47.7	−5.6
Liberal Democrats	R. Martins	721	42.6	+7.6
Conservative	Z. Basit	164	9.7	−2.0
Majority			5.1	
Turnout		1,693	31.0	
Labour gain from Liberal Democrats		Swing	▼6.6	

=== Holywell ===
Holywell
Party	Candidate	Votes	%	±%
Labour	S. Rosser	664	62.9	−3.5
Liberal Democrats	J. Baddeley	218	20.6	+4.0
Conservative	P. Jenkins	174	16.5	−0.5
Majority			42.2	
Turnout		1,056	19.7	
Labour hold		Swing	▼3.8	

=== Leggatts ===
Leggatts
Party	Candidate	Votes	%	±%
Conservative	S. O'Brien	730	49.3	+19.6
Labour	J. Dhindsa	620	41.9	−14.9
Liberal Democrats	S. Hamid	130	8.8	−4.7
Majority			7.4	
Turnout		1,480	33.9	
Conservative gain from Labour		Swing	▲17.3	

=== Meriden ===
Meriden
Party	Candidate	Votes	%	±%
Labour	R. Banham	794	54.2	−8.1
Conservative	P. Bell	480	32.7	+10.8
Liberal Democrats	M. Lane	192	13.1	−2.7
Majority			21.4	
Turnout		1,466	27.5	
Labour hold		Swing	▼9.5	

=== Nascot ===
Nascot
Party	Candidate	Votes	%	±%
Conservative	J. Brown	752	51.6	+3.3
Labour	T. Meldrum	359	24.7	−5.3
Liberal Democrats	J. Jenkins	345	23.7	+2.1
Majority			27.0	
Turnout		1,456	26.9	
Conservative hold		Swing	▲4.3	

=== Oxhey ===
Oxhey
Party	Candidate	Votes	%	±%
Liberal Democrats	A. Poole	1,112	58.8	−3.4
Conservative	G. Greenstreet	483	25.6	+4.5
Labour	N. Akubue	295	15.6	−1.0
Majority			33.3	
Turnout		1,890	40.4	
Liberal Democrats gain from Conservative		Swing	▼4.0	

=== Park ===
Park
Party	Candidate	Votes	%	±%
Conservative	D. Wright	928	61.4	+6.6
Liberal Democrats	P. Jenkins	364	24.1	−5.9
Labour	C. Barry	220	14.6	−0.7
Majority			37.3	
Turnout		1,512	37.4	
Conservative hold		Swing	▲6.3	

=== Stanborough ===
Stanborough
Party	Candidate	Votes	%	±%
Liberal Democrats	D. Scudder	965	60.5	+17.7
Conservative	A. Jones	359	22.5	−7.7
Labour	S. Sardar	270	16.9	−10.1
Majority			38.0	
Turnout		1,594	32.4	
Liberal Democrats hold		Swing	▲12.7	

=== Tudor ===
Tudor (2 seats due to by-election)
Party	Candidate	Votes	%
Labour	S. Palmer	690	44.8
Labour	M. Chhina	634	41.2
Conservative	P. Fincham	464	30.1
Conservative	H. Ling	397	25.8
Liberal Democrats	M. Palmer	346	22.5
Liberal Democrats	J. Richmond	315	20.5
Turnout		1,539	29.9
Labour hold			
Labour hold			

=== Vicarage ===
Vicarage
Party	Candidate	Votes	%	±%
Labour	B. Graham	990	58.7	+7.4
Liberal Democrats	A. Zafar	414	24.6	−14.9
Conservative	A. Bell	282	16.7	+7.5
Majority			34.2	
Turnout		1,686	31.0	
Labour hold		Swing	▲11.2	

=== Woodside ===
Woodside
Party	Candidate	Votes	%	±%
Liberal Democrats	A. Burtenshaw	939	51.4	+1.7
Labour	G. O'Connell	747	40.9	−1.2
Conservative	D. Ealey	141	7.7	−0.5
Majority			10.5	
Turnout		1,827	35.7	
Liberal Democrats hold		Swing	▲1.5	
