= 1998 Redditch Borough Council election =

1998 UK local government election

Elections to Redditch Borough Council were held on 7 May 1998. One third of the council was up for election and the Labour Party stayed in overall control of the council.

After the election, the composition of the council was:

- Labour 23
- Conservative 4
- Liberal Democrat 2

== Campaign ==
In total 11 seats were up for election, with two seats contested in Batchley ward after the resignation of a Labour councillor there. The only ward where there was no election this year was Church Hill.

As only a third of the seats were being elected the Labour Party was guaranteed to keep its majority on the council. However the Conservatives were hoping to gain at least two seats in the election and raised increases in council house rents and controversy over disability benefits as issues where they could benefit from.

== Election results ==
The results saw only one seat change hands with the Liberal Democrats gaining a seat in Abbey ward from Labour. A low turnout of under 25% was raised as concerning development.

Redditch local election result 1998
Party	Seats	Gains	Losses	Net gain/loss	Seats %	Votes %	Votes	+/−
Labour	8	0	1	-1	72.7			
Conservative	2	0	0	0	18.2			
Liberal Democrats	1	1	0	+1	9.1			
