= 1998 Rossendale Borough Council election =

1998 UK local government election

Elections to Rossendale Borough Council were held on 7 May 1998. One third of the council was up for election and the Labour Party stayed in overall control of the council. Overall turnout was 30%.

After the election, the composition of the council was:

- Labour 25
- Conservative 11

== Election result ==
Rossendale local election result 1998
| Party | Seats | Gains | Losses | Net gain/loss | Seats % | Votes % | Votes | +/− |
|---|---|---|---|---|---|---|---|---|
| Conservative | 7 | 6 | 0 | +6 | 58.3 | 51.6 | 7,338 | |
| Labour | 5 | 0 | 6 | -6 | 41.7 | 48.4 | 6,889 | |

== Ward results ==
Cribden
| Party | Candidate | Votes | % | ±% |
|---|---|---|---|---|
| Labour | L Forshaw | 810 | 57.2 | |
| Conservative | M Ormerod | 606 | 42.8 | |
| Majority | | 204 | 14.4 | |
| Turnout | | 1,416 | 27.0 | |
| Labour hold | | Swing | | |

Eden
| Party | Candidate | Votes | % | ±% |
|---|---|---|---|---|
| Conservative | J Cheetham | 476 | 52.3 | |
| Labour | J Johnson | 435 | 47.7 | |
| Majority | | 41 | 4.6 | |
| Turnout | | 911 | 33.1 | |
| Conservative hold | | Swing | | |

Greenfield
| Party | Candidate | Votes | % | ±% |
|---|---|---|---|---|
| Conservative | J Thorne | 634 | 52.6 | |
| Labour | J Whitehead | 572 | 47.4 | |
| Majority | | 62 | 5.2 | |
| Turnout | | 1,206 | 27.8 | |
| Conservative gain from Labour | | Swing | | |

Greensclough
| Party | Candidate | Votes | % | ±% |
|---|---|---|---|---|
| Conservative | J Driver | 771 | 67.1 | |
| Labour | D Baron | 378 | 32.9 | |
| Majority | | 393 | 34.2 | |
| Turnout | | 1,149 | 33.0 | |
| Conservative gain from Labour | | Swing | | |

Hareholme
| Party | Candidate | Votes | % | ±% |
|---|---|---|---|---|
| Labour | G Pearson | 728 | 55.0 | |
| Conservative | D Ruddick | 596 | 45.0 | |
| Majority | | 132 | 10.0 | |
| Turnout | | 1,324 | 30.8 | |
| Labour hold | | Swing | | |

Healey and Whitworth
| Party | Candidate | Votes | % | ±% |
|---|---|---|---|---|
| Conservative | J Grogan | 517 | 55.5 | |
| Labour | C Adamson | 415 | 44.5 | |
| Majority | | 102 | 11.0 | |
| Turnout | | 932 | 26.9 | |
| Conservative gain from Labour | | Swing | | |

Helmshore
| Party | Candidate | Votes | % | ±% |
|---|---|---|---|---|
| Conservative | R Beavan | 835 | 52.4 | |
| Labour | M Proctor | 758 | 47.6 | |
| Majority | | 77 | 4.8 | |
| Turnout | | 1,593 | 30.4 | |
| Conservative gain from Labour | | Swing | | |

Irwell
| Party | Candidate | Votes | % | ±% |
|---|---|---|---|---|
| Conservative | P Steen | 786 | 58.9 | |
| Labour | P Heyworth | 549 | 41.1 | |
| Majority | | 237 | 17.8 | |
| Turnout | | 1,335 | 32.4 | |
| Conservative gain from Labour | | Swing | | |

Longholme
| Party | Candidate | Votes | % | ±% |
|---|---|---|---|---|
| Labour | J Pilling | 627 | 53.6 | |
| Conservative | L Entwistle | 542 | 46.4 | |
| Majority | | 85 | 7.2 | |
| Turnout | | 1,169 | 29.1 | |
| Labour hold | | Swing | | |

Stacksteads
| Party | Candidate | Votes | % | ±% |
|---|---|---|---|---|
| Labour | D Easton | 503 | 50.9 | |
| Conservative | D Nuttall | 486 | 49.1 | |
| Majority | | 17 | 1.8 | |
| Turnout | | 989 | 32.2 | |
| Labour hold | | Swing | | |

Whitewell
| Party | Candidate | Votes | % | ±% |
|---|---|---|---|---|
| Labour | D Hancock | 660 | 54.1 | |
| Conservative | C Marsden | 559 | 45.9 | |
| Majority | | 101 | 8.2 | |
| Turnout | | 1,219 | 28.5 | |
| Labour hold | | Swing | | |

Worsley
| Party | Candidate | Votes | % | ±% |
|---|---|---|---|---|
| Conservative | S Birtwell | 530 | 53.9 | |
| Labour | J McManus | 454 | 46.1 | |
| Majority | | 76 | 7.8 | |
| Turnout | | 984 | 32.4 | |
| Conservative gain from Labour | | Swing | | |
