= 1998 Newcastle-under-Lyme Borough Council election =

1998 UK local government election

Elections to Newcastle-under-Lyme Borough Council were held on 7 May 1998. One third of the council stood for election, and the Labour party kept control of the council. After the election, the composition of the council was

- Labour 42
- Liberal Democrat 9
- Conservative 5

== Election result ==
Newcastle-under-Lyme local election result 1998
Party	Seats	Gains	Losses	Net gain/loss	Seats %	Votes %	Votes	+/−
Labour	14			0	73.7			
Liberal Democrats	3			-1	15.8			
Conservative	2			+1	10.5			
