= 1998 Mole Valley District Council election =

1998 UK local government election

Elections to Mole Valley Council were held on 7 May 1998. One third of the council was up for election and the council stayed under no overall control.

After the election, the composition of the council was

- Liberal Democrat 16
- Conservative 14
- Independent 9
- Labour 2

== Election result ==
Mole Valley local election result 1998
Party	Seats	Gains	Losses	Net gain/loss	Seats %	Votes %	Votes	+/−
Liberal Democrats	8			-2	57.1			
Conservative	4			+2	28.6			
Independent	2			0	14.3			
