= 1998 West Lindsey District Council election =

1998 UK local government election

Elections to West Lindsey District Council were held on 7 May 1998. One third of the council was up for election and the Liberal Democrat party lost overall control of the council to no overall control.

After the election, the composition of the council was

- Liberal Democrat 18
- Independent 9
- Labour 5
- Conservative 4
- Others 1

== Election result ==
West Lindsey local election result 1998
| Party | Seats | Gains | Losses | Net gain/loss | Seats % | Votes % | Votes | +/− |
|---|---|---|---|---|---|---|---|---|
| Liberal Democrats | 7 | | | -2 | 58.3 | | | |
| Conservative | 3 | | | +3 | 25.0 | | | |
| Labour | 2 | | | +2 | 16.7 | | | |
| Independent | 0 | | | -2 | 0 | | | |
| Others | 0 | | | -1 | 0 | | | |
