= 1998 Milton Keynes Council election =

1998 UK local government election

The 1998 Milton Keynes Council election took place on 7 May 1998 to elect members of Milton Keynes Unitary Council in Buckinghamshire, England. One third of the council was up for election and the Labour party stayed in overall control of the council.

After the election, the composition of the council was

- Labour 27
- Liberal Democrat 19
- Conservative 4
- Independent 1

== Election result ==
Milton Keynes local election result 1998
Party	Seats	Gains	Losses	Net gain/loss	Seats %	Votes %	Votes	+/−
Labour	10			-2	55.6			
Liberal Democrats	6			+1	33.3			
Conservative	2			+1	11.1			
