= 1998 Burnley Borough Council election =

1998 UK local government election

The 1998 Burnley Borough Council election took place on 7 May 1998 to elect members of Burnley Borough Council in Lancashire, England. One third of the council was up for election and the Labour Party stayed in overall control of the council.

An issue in the election were allegations that there had been misuse of the procedure for allocating council housing. This saw 3 Labour councillors face disciplinary action, with the issue being described as "Burnleygate".

The results saw three seats change hands with each of the Liberal Democrats, Conservatives and Independents gaining one seat from Labour. The result in Lowerhouse ward saw former Labour councillor, Eddie Fisk, hold the seat as an independent. Fisk defeated his nephew Sam Holgate who was the Labour candidate but stopped campaigning due to ill health and then resigned from the party as well.

After the election, the composition of the council was:

- Labour 31
- Liberal Democrat 9
- Independent 6
- Conservative 2

== Election result ==
Burnley local election result 1998
Party	Seats	Gains	Losses	Net gain/loss	Seats %	Votes %	Votes	+/−
Labour	11	0	3	-3	61.1	49.9	8,834	
Liberal Democrats	4	1	0	+1	22.2	29.5	5,228	
Independent	2	1	0	+1	11.1	8.9	1,570	
Conservative	1	1	0	+1	5.6	11.7	2,065	

== Ward results ==
Bank Hall
Party	Candidate	Votes	%	±%
Independent	R Chadwick	501	54.9	
Labour	A Aziz	412	45.1	
Majority		89	9.8	
Turnout		913	22.4	
Independent gain from Labour		Swing		

Barclay
Party	Candidate	Votes	%	±%
Labour	S Wolski	333	55.1	
Liberal Democrats	M Brown	271	44.9	
Majority		62	10.2	
Turnout		604	18.8	
Labour hold		Swing		

Briercliffe
Party	Candidate	Votes	%	±%
Liberal Democrats	MA Lishman	683	67.8	
Labour	SR Dumon	325	32.2	
Majority		358	35.6	
Turnout		1,008	22.4	
Liberal Democrats hold		Swing		

Brunshaw
Party	Candidate	Votes	%	±%
Labour	AJ Rae	551	66.3	
Liberal Democrats	LK Whittaker	280	33.7	
Majority		271	32.6	
Turnout		831	22.6	
Labour hold		Swing		

Brunshaw
Party	Candidate	Votes	%	±%
Labour	P Walsh	618	52.2	
Conservative	D Heginbotham	567	47.8	
Majority		51	4.4	
Turnout		1,185	27.1	
Labour hold		Swing		

Coalclough with Deerplay
Party	Candidate	Votes	%	±%
Liberal Democrats	P McCann	662	67.3	
Labour	J Ormerod	322	32.7	
Majority		340	34.6	
Turnout		984	23.1	
Liberal Democrats hold		Swing		

Daneshouse
Party	Candidate	Votes	%	±%
Liberal Democrats	RMA Khan	1,255	50.5	
Labour	SA Chaudhary	1,231	49.5	
Majority		24	1.0	
Turnout		2,486	61.4	
Liberal Democrats hold		Swing		

Fulledge
Party	Candidate	Votes	%	±%
Labour	DS Halsall	626	75.2	
Liberal Democrats	CJ Thompson	128	15.4	
Conservative	DJ Tierney	79	9.5	
Majority		498	59.8	
Turnout		833	22.0	
Labour hold		Swing		

Gawthorpe
Party	Candidate	Votes	%	±%
Labour	A Hudson	546	62.4	
Conservative	LA Dowding	189	21.6	
Liberal Democrats	M McHugh	140	16.0	
Majority		367	40.8	
Turnout		875	19.2	
Labour hold		Swing		

Hapton
Party	Candidate	Votes	%	±%
Labour	J Harbour	532	58.1	
Liberal Democrats	C Howarth	383	41.9	
Majority		149	16.2	
Turnout		915	19.0	
Labour hold		Swing		

Lanehead
Party	Candidate	Votes	%	±%
Labour	J Cavanagh	559	65.5	
Liberal Democrats	MJ McCann	294	34.5	
Majority		265	31.0	
Turnout		853	19.3	
Labour hold		Swing		

Lowerhouse
Party	Candidate	Votes	%	±%
Independent	E Fisk	556	52.5	
Labour	SK Holgate	311	29.3	
Conservative	B Robinson	193	18.2	
Majority		245	23.2	
Turnout		1,060	24.7	
Independent hold		Swing		

Queensgate
Party	Candidate	Votes	%	±%
Labour	PJ Kenyon	497	54.3	
Independent	AR Holder	306	33.4	
Liberal Democrats	MN Islam	113	12.3	
Majority		191	20.9	
Turnout		916	21.8	
Labour hold		Swing		

Rosehill
Party	Candidate	Votes	%	±%
Liberal Democrats	B Hill	368	37.3	
Conservative	P Jones	327	33.1	
Labour	N Miah	292	29.6	
Majority		41	4.2	
Turnout		987	23.0	
Liberal Democrats gain from Labour		Swing		

Trinity (2)
Party	Candidate	Votes	%	±%
Labour	A Lambert	437		
Labour	M Winder	419		
Liberal Democrats	DR Embra	218		
Conservative	E Parker	183		
Turnout		1,257	23.8	
Labour hold		Swing		
Labour hold		Swing		

Whittlefield with Ightenhill (2)
Party	Candidate	Votes	%	±%
Conservative	I Fowler	527		
Labour	C Barber	441		
Liberal Democrats	PR Wright	433		
Labour	M Martin	382		
Independent	JA Holder	207		
Turnout		1,990	21.4	
Conservative gain from Labour		Swing		
Labour hold		Swing		
