= 1998 Knowsley Metropolitan Borough Council election =

1998 UK local government election

Knowsley Metropolitan Borough Council Elections were held on 7 May 1998. One-third of the council was up for election and the Labour party kept overall control of the council.

After the election, the composition of the council was

- Labour 65
- Liberal Democrat 1

== Election result ==
Knowsley local election result 1998
Party	Seats	Gains	Losses	Net gain/loss	Seats %	Votes %	Votes	+/−
Labour	23			+1	100			
Liberal Democrats	0			-1	0			
