= 1998 Maidstone Borough Council election =

1998 UK local government election

The 1998 Maidstone Borough Council election took place on 7 May 1998 to elect members of Maidstone Borough Council in Kent, England. One third of the council was up for election and the council stayed under no overall control.

After the election, the composition of the council was

- Liberal Democrat 21
- Labour 16
- Conservative 13
- Independent 5

== Election result ==
Overall turnout in the election was 27.35%.

Maidstone local election result 1998
Party	Seats	Gains	Losses	Net gain/loss	Seats %	Votes %	Votes	+/−
Liberal Democrats	8			-4	44.4	43.6		
Labour	4			+2	22.2	30.7		
Conservative	4			+2	22.2	23.8		
Independent	2			0	11.1			
