= 1998 Runnymede Borough Council election =

1998 UK local government election

Elections to Runnymede Council were held on 7 May 1998. One third of the council was up for election and the Conservative party gained overall control of the council from no overall control.

After the election, the composition of the council was

- Conservative 23
- Labour 12
- Independent 5
- Liberal Democrat 1
- Residents Association 1

== Election result ==
Runnymede local election result 1998
Party	Seats	Gains	Losses	Net gain/loss	Seats %	Votes %	Votes	+/−
Conservative	8			+2	53.3	47.1	9,396	
Labour	4			-2	26.7	28.7	5,734	
Liberal Democrats	1			0	6.7	15.6	3,108	
Residents Association	1			+1	6.7	4.8	955	
Independent	1			-1	6.7	3.9	769	

== Ward results ==
Addlestone Bourneside
Party	Candidate	Votes	%	±%
Conservative	Elizabeth Blake	883	53.2	
Labour	Peter Kingham	776	46.8	
Majority		107	6.4	
Turnout		1,659	38.6	

Addlestone North
Party	Candidate	Votes	%	±%
Labour	Keith Cliff	755	53.9	
Conservative	Terry Dicks	645	46.1	
Majority		110	7.8	
Turnout		1,400	34.4	

Addlestone St. Paul's
Party	Candidate	Votes	%	±%
Conservative	Grahame Leon-Smith	802	61.5	
Labour	Kenneth Denyer	298	22.8	
Liberal Democrats	Gillian Taggart	205	15.7	
Majority		504	38.7	
Turnout		1,305	29.7	

Chertsey Meads
Party	Candidate	Votes	%	±%
Conservative	Sarah Jacobs	820	45.5	
Labour	Linda Quinn	801	44.5	
Liberal Democrats	Prudence Horne	180	10.0	
Majority		19	1.0	
Turnout		1,801	34.6	

Chertsey St. Ann's
Party	Candidate	Votes	%	±%
Labour	Mary Lowther	765	57.6	
Conservative	Graham Thomas	469	35.3	
Liberal Democrats	Noel Kehoe	93	7.0	
Majority		296	22.3	
Turnout		1,327	34.3	

Egham
Party	Candidate	Votes	%	±%
Residents Association	Brian Clarke	955	63.1	
Conservative	Hannes Kleineke	286	18.9	
Labour	William Holland	273	18.0	
Majority		669	44.2	
Turnout		1,514	28.5	

Englefield Green East
Party	Candidate	Votes	%	±%
Conservative	Carole Jones	485	55.9	
Labour	Martin Rudd	202	23.3	
Liberal Democrats	Peter Key	180	20.8	
Majority		283	32.6	
Turnout		867	20.5	

Englefield Green West
Party	Candidate	Votes	%	±%
Labour	Alan Clark	584	47.7	
Conservative	Timothy Stones	533	43.5	
Liberal Democrats	Stuart Bonar	108	8.8	
Majority		51	4.2	
Turnout		1,225	31.1	

Foxhills
Party	Candidate	Votes	%	±%
Conservative	David Easton	774	60.0	
Liberal Democrats	Carl Boyde	517	40.0	
Majority		257	20.0	
Turnout		1,291	30.2	

Hythe
Party	Candidate	Votes	%	±%
Labour	Edward Barrett	635	54.8	
Conservative	Dennis Dormer	401	34.6	
Liberal Democrats	Dorian Mead	123	10.6	
Majority		234	20.2	
Turnout		1,159	24.5	

New Haw
Party	Candidate	Votes	%	±%
Liberal Democrats	Kenneth Graham	810	60.4	
Conservative	James Broadhead	530	39.6	
Majority		280	20.8	
Turnout		1,340	34.4	

Thorpe
Party	Candidate	Votes	%	±%
Independent	Francis Tourlamain	769	63.2	
Conservative	Mark Pearce	295	24.3	
Labour	Monica Dowling	152	12.5	
Majority		474	38.9	
Turnout		1,216	29.1	

Virginia Water
Party	Candidate	Votes	%	±%
Conservative	Peter Poole	731	76.5	
Labour	Colin Archer	113	11.8	
Liberal Democrats	Thomas Palm	112	11.7	
Majority		618	64.7	
Turnout		956	32.3	

Woodham (2)
Party	Candidate	Votes	%	±%
Conservative	Florence Angell	883		
Conservative	John Keene	859		
Liberal Democrats	Peter Hartwell	397		
Liberal Democrats	David Castleton	383		
Labour	George Blair	213		
Labour	Shaun O'Byrne	167		
Turnout		2,902	39.7	
