= 1998 St Albans City and District Council election =

1998 UK local government election

The 1998 St Albans City and District Council election took place on 7 May 1998 to elect members of St Albans City and District Council in Hertfordshire, England. One third of the council was up for election and the Liberal Democrats stayed in overall control of the council.

After the election, the composition of the council was:

- Liberal Democrats 30
- Labour 16
- Conservative 11

== Election results ==
The Liberal Democrats were reduced from 39 to 30 councillors, but retained a 3-seat majority on the council. Liberal Democrat losses included losing seats to Labour in Ashley, Cunningham and St Peters wards, while Labour also held Sopwell where Kerry Pollard had stood down after being elected Member of Parliament for St Albans at the 1997 general election. This took Labour to 16 seats, while the Conservatives increased to 11 seats after gaining 5 seats from the Liberal Democrats in Harpenden North, Harpenden South, Harpenden West, St Stephen and Verulam wards, with the majority in Harpenden North only being 23 votes after a recount. Overall turnout at the election was 36%.

1998 St Albans City and District Council election
| Party | This election | | | Full council | | | This election | | |
| Party | Seats | Net | Seats % | Other | Total | Total % | Votes | Votes % | +/− |
|---|---|---|---|---|---|---|---|---|---|
| Liberal Democrats | 8 | ▼9 | 38.1 | 22 | 30 | 52.6 | 13,503 | 35.9 | -1.6 |
| Labour | 7 | ▲4 | 33.3 | 9 | 16 | 28.1 | 11,573 | 30.8 | -2.9 |
| Conservative | 6 | ▲5 | 28.6 | 5 | 11 | 19.3 | 12,513 | 33.3 | +4.6 |
| Natural Law | 0 | Steady | 0.0 | 0 | 0 | 0.0 | 14 | <0.1 | N/A |

== Ward results ==
Ashley
| Party | Candidate | Votes | % | ±% |
|---|---|---|---|---|
| Labour | Noreen Brosnan | 1,073 | 53.3 | |
| Liberal Democrats | Paul Riley | 717 | 35.6 | |
| Conservative | Patricia Spratt | 223 | 11.1 | |
| Majority | | 356 | 17.7 | |
| Turnout | | 2,013 | | |
| Labour gain from Liberal Democrats | | Swing | | |

Batchwood
| Party | Candidate | Votes | % | ±% |
|---|---|---|---|---|
| Labour | David McManus | 987 | 65.1 | |
| Conservative | James Vessey | 295 | 19.5 | |
| Liberal Democrats | Robin Law | 234 | 15.4 | |
| Majority | | 692 | 45.6 | |
| Turnout | | 1,516 | | |
| Labour hold | | Swing | | |

Clarence
| Party | Candidate | Votes | % | ±% |
|---|---|---|---|---|
| Liberal Democrats | Sheila Burton | 931 | 51.5 | |
| Labour | William Niblett | 597 | 33.0 | |
| Conservative | Jeremy Christie | 279 | 15.4 | |
| Majority | | 334 | 18.5 | |
| Turnout | | 1,807 | | |
| Liberal Democrats hold | | Swing | | |

Colney Heath
| Party | Candidate | Votes | % | ±% |
|---|---|---|---|---|
| Liberal Democrats | John Henchley | 565 | 52.0 | |
| Conservative | Derek Jeffrey | 262 | 24.1 | |
| Labour | Gordon Watson | 260 | 23.9 | |
| Majority | | 303 | 27.9 | |
| Turnout | | 1,087 | | |
| Liberal Democrats hold | | Swing | | |

Cunningham (2 seats)
| Party | Candidate | Votes | % | ±% |
|---|---|---|---|---|
| Labour | Andrew Gilson | 910 | 43.5 | |
| Labour | Laurence Heyman | 865 | 41.3 | |
| Liberal Democrats | Geoffrey Harrison | 833 | 39.8 | |
| Liberal Democrats | Joy Winder | 778 | 37.2 | |
| Conservative | Graham Leonard | 346 | 16.5 | |
| Conservative | Louisa-Jane Rosalki | 323 | 15.4 | |
| Turnout | | 2,094 | | |
| Labour gain from Liberal Democrats | | Swing | | |
| Labour gain from Liberal Democrats | | Swing | | |

Harpenden East
| Party | Candidate | Votes | % | ±% |
|---|---|---|---|---|
| Liberal Democrats | David Waddilove | 769 | 43.6 | |
| Conservative | Victor Holley | 665 | 37.7 | |
| Labour | David Crew | 329 | 18.7 | |
| Majority | | 104 | 5.9 | |
| Turnout | | 1,763 | | |
| Liberal Democrats hold | | Swing | | |

Harpenden North
| Party | Candidate | Votes | % | ±% |
|---|---|---|---|---|
| Conservative | Albert Pawle | 759 | 42.0 | |
| Liberal Democrats | John Coad | 736 | 40.7 | |
| Labour | Richard Botterill | 314 | 17.4 | |
| Majority | | 23 | 1.3 | |
| Turnout | | 1,809 | | |
| Conservative gain from Liberal Democrats | | Swing | | |

Harpenden South
| Party | Candidate | Votes | % | ±% |
|---|---|---|---|---|
| Conservative | Paul Foster | 1,125 | 58.6 | |
| Liberal Democrats | Katharine Sutton | 503 | 26.2 | |
| Labour | Linda Spiri | 277 | 14.4 | |
| Natural Law | Patricia Saunders | 14 | 0.7 | |
| Majority | | 622 | 32.4 | |
| Turnout | | 1,919 | | |
| Conservative gain from Liberal Democrats | | Swing | | |

Harpenden West (2 seats)
| Party | Candidate | Votes | % | ±% |
|---|---|---|---|---|
| Conservative | Julian Turner | 1,139 | 61.7 | |
| Conservative | Julian Daly | 1,138 | 61.7 | |
| Liberal Democrats | Judith Arthur | 418 | 22.7 | |
| Liberal Democrats | Paul Spinks | 373 | 20.2 | |
| Labour | Joanne Thompson | 283 | 15.3 | |
| Labour | Judith Bush | 264 | 14.3 | |
| Turnout | | 1,845 | | |
| Conservative gain from Liberal Democrats | | Swing | | |
| Conservative hold | | Swing | | |

London Colney
| Party | Candidate | Votes | % | ±% |
|---|---|---|---|---|
| Labour | Sean Flynn | 1,094 | 71.4 | |
| Conservative | Mark Shaw | 260 | 17.0 | |
| Liberal Democrats | David Priestman | 179 | 11.7 | |
| Majority | | 834 | 54.4 | |
| Turnout | | 1,533 | | |
| Labour hold | | Swing | | |

Marshalswick North
| Party | Candidate | Votes | % | ±% |
|---|---|---|---|---|
| Liberal Democrats | Geoffrey Churchard | 781 | 46.3 | |
| Conservative | Christopher Whiteside | 623 | 37.0 | |
| Labour | Elizabeth McShane | 282 | 16.7 | |
| Majority | | 158 | 9.4 | |
| Turnout | | 1,686 | | |
| Liberal Democrats hold | | Swing | | |

Marshalswick South
| Party | Candidate | Votes | % | ±% |
|---|---|---|---|---|
| Liberal Democrats | Anthony Rowlands | 1,141 | 54.3 | |
| Conservative | Agnes Hill | 580 | 27.6 | |
| Labour | David Allan | 380 | 18.1 | |
| Majority | | 561 | 26.7 | |
| Turnout | | 2,101 | | |
| Liberal Democrats hold | | Swing | | |

Park Street
| Party | Candidate | Votes | % | ±% |
|---|---|---|---|---|
| Liberal Democrats | Elizabeth Hendry | 499 | 40.5 | |
| Conservative | Keith Batson | 396 | 32.1 | |
| Labour | Mary Morley | 338 | 27.4 | |
| Majority | | 103 | 8.4 | |
| Turnout | | 1,233 | | |
| Liberal Democrats hold | | Swing | | |

Redbourn
| Party | Candidate | Votes | % | ±% |
|---|---|---|---|---|
| Liberal Democrats | Patricia Schofield | 765 | 44.0 | |
| Conservative | Paul Finigan | 723 | 41.6 | |
| Labour | Vivienne Windle | 249 | 14.3 | |
| Majority | | 42 | 2.4 | |
| Turnout | | 1,737 | | |
| Liberal Democrats hold | | Swing | | |

Sopwell
| Party | Candidate | Votes | % | ±% |
|---|---|---|---|---|
| Labour | Janetta Gibbs | 1,076 | 73.1 | |
| Conservative | Pamela Thomas | 223 | 15.2 | |
| Liberal Democrats | David Terrar | 172 | 11.7 | |
| Majority | | 853 | 58.0 | |
| Turnout | | 1,471 | | |
| Labour hold | | Swing | | |

St Peters
| Party | Candidate | Votes | % | ±% |
|---|---|---|---|---|
| Labour | Winifred Dunleavy | 867 | 49.9 | |
| Liberal Democrats | Richard Biddle | 644 | 37.1 | |
| Conservative | Geoffrey Brown | 226 | 13.0 | |
| Majority | | 228 | 12.8 | |
| Turnout | | 1,737 | | |
| Labour gain from Liberal Democrats | | Swing | | |

St Stephen
| Party | Candidate | Votes | % | ±% |
|---|---|---|---|---|
| Conservative | Gordon Myland | 951 | 43.5 | |
| Liberal Democrats | Khalil Moghul | 791 | 36.2 | |
| Labour | Janet Blackwell | 444 | 20.3 | |
| Majority | | 160 | 7.3 | |
| Turnout | | 2,186 | | |
| Conservative gain from Liberal Democrats | | Swing | | |

Verulam
| Party | Candidate | Votes | % | ±% |
|---|---|---|---|---|
| Conservative | John Smith | 1,150 | 49.1 | |
| Liberal Democrats | Richard Mort | 822 | 35.1 | |
| Labour | Jerry Brenton | 370 | 15.8 | |
| Majority | | 328 | 14.0 | |
| Turnout | | 2,342 | | |
| Conservative gain from Liberal Democrats | | Swing | | |

Wheathampstead
| Party | Candidate | Votes | % | ±% |
|---|---|---|---|---|
| Liberal Democrats | Christopher Oxley | 852 | 42.7 | |
| Conservative | Gillian Clark | 827 | 41.5 | |
| Labour | Michael Fletcher | 314 | 15.8 | |
| Majority | | 25 | 1.3 | |
| Turnout | | 1,993 | | |
| Liberal Democrats hold | | Swing | | |

== By-elections ==
Sopwell by-election 23 July 1998
| Party | Candidate | Votes | % | ±% |
|---|---|---|---|---|
| Labour | | 841 | 68.3 | −4.8 |
| Conservative | | 212 | 17.2 | +2.0 |
| Liberal Democrats | | 178 | 14.5 | +2.8 |
| Majority | | 629 | 51.1 | −6.9 |
| Turnout | | 1,231 | 23.5 | |
| Labour hold | | Swing | | |
