= 1998 Wolverhampton Metropolitan Borough Council election =

1998 UK local government election

The 1998 Wolverhampton Metropolitan Borough Council election took place on 7 May 1998 to elect members of Wolverhampton Metropolitan Borough Council in the West Midlands, England. One third of the council was up for election and the Labour Party kept overall control of the council.

After the election, the composition of the council was:

- Labour 44
- Conservative 14
- Liberal Democrat 2

== Campaign ==
20 of the 60 seats on the council were up for election with Labour defending 15, the Conservatives 4 and the Liberal Democrats 1. All three parties leaders on the council were defending their seats in the election, Labour's Norman Davies, Conservative Jim Carpenter and the Liberal Democrats Malcolm Gwynnett. However Labour were guaranteed to remain in control of the council as they had 46 councillors before the election, compared to 12 Conservatives and 2 Liberal Democrats. As well as the 3 main parties the only other candidates were 3 Liberals and 2 Labour Independents.

The Conservative national leader William Hague attacked the Labour council as he said they lowered the education budget while setting one of the highest metropolitan council taxes in the country. However Labour's council leader joined with other local leaders to make a joint response and said that when the Conservatives were in control taxes in Wolverhampton had gone up by 57%.

== Election result ==
Labour retained control of the council after the election with a majority of 28, but lost 2 seats to the Conservatives in Bushbury and Park wards. Overall turnout in the election was 29.95%, but reached a low of only 18% in Low Hill.

Wolverhampton local election result 1998
Party	Seats	Gains	Losses	Net gain/loss	Seats %	Votes %	Votes	+/−
Labour	13	0	2	-2	65.0	47.1	25,940	
Conservative	6	2	0	+2	30.0	37.9	20,906	
Liberal Democrats	1	0	0	0	5.0	12.9	7,112	
Liberal	0	0	0	0	0.0	1.7	960	
Independent Labour	0	0	0	0	0.0	0.4	200	

== Ward results ==
Bilston East
Party	Candidate	Votes	%	±%
Labour	Norman Davies	1,117	65.3	
Conservative	Mark Blakeley	334	19.5	
Liberal Democrats	William Beard	259	15.1	
Majority		783	45.8	
Turnout		1,710	20.7	

Bilston North
Party	Candidate	Votes	%	±%
Labour	Trudy Bowen	1,381	54.2	
Conservative	Wayne Lawley	954	37.5	
Liberal Democrats	Michael Rowan	212	8.3	
Majority		427	16.7	
Turnout		2,547	24.1	

Blakenhall
Party	Candidate	Votes	%	±%
Labour	John Rowley	2,118	76.4	
Conservative	Brenda Wilson	477	17.2	
Liberal Democrats	June Hemsley	177	6.4	
Majority		1,641	59.2	
Turnout		2,772	31.3	

Bushbury
Party	Candidate	Votes	%	±%
Conservative	Charles Brueton	1,337	51.0	
Labour	Patricia Wesley	1,051	40.1	
Liberal Democrats	David Buckley	233	8.9	
Majority		286	10.9	
Turnout		2,621	29.4	

East Park
Party	Candidate	Votes	%	±%
Labour	Keith Inston	1,344	66.7	
Conservative	Maxine Bradley	462	22.9	
Liberal Democrats	Ann Whitehouse	209	10.4	
Majority		882	43.8	
Turnout		2,015	24.2	

Ettingshall
Party	Candidate	Votes	%	±%
Labour	John Shelley	1,248	70.3	
Conservative	Christopher Haynes	382	21.5	
Liberal Democrats	Michael Heap	146	8.2	
Majority		866	48.8	
Turnout		1,776	21.4	

Fallings Park
Party	Candidate	Votes	%	±%
Labour	Joyce Hill	1,218	48.9	
Conservative	Kenneth Hodges	952	38.2	
Liberal Democrats	Anthony Bourke	321	12.9	
Majority		266	10.7	
Turnout		2,491	30.0	

Graiseley
Party	Candidate	Votes	%	±%
Labour	John Reynolds	1,812	51.7	
Conservative	David Jack	1,249	35.6	
Liberal Democrats	Mary Millar	320	9.1	
Independent Labour	Amrik Sekhon	127	3.6	
Majority		563	16.1	
Turnout		3,508	37.8	

Heath Town
Party	Candidate	Votes	%	±%
Labour	Greg Brackenridge	1,244	60.7	
Liberal	Colin Hallmark	526	25.6	
Conservative	Sham Sharma	281	13.7	
Majority		781	35.1	
Turnout		2,051	25.3	

Low Hill
Party	Candidate	Votes	%	±%
Labour	Peter Bilson	1,116	66.4	
Conservative	Peter Topliss	382	22.7	
Liberal Democrats	Ian Jenkins	182	10.8	
Majority		734	43.7	
Turnout		1,680	18.8	

Merry Hill
Party	Candidate	Votes	%	±%
Conservative	Robert Hart	1,752	55.3	
Labour	Colin Matthews	996	31.5	
Liberal Democrats	Paul Hodson	418	13.2	
Majority		756	23.8	
Turnout		3,166	32.9	

Oxley
Party	Candidate	Votes	%	±%
Labour	Christine Irvine	1,280	48.0	
Conservative	David Meredith	998	37.4	
Liberal Democrats	David Isles	318	11.9	
Independent Labour	David Watson	73	2.7	
Majority		282	10.6	
Turnout		2,669	27.7	

Park
Party	Candidate	Votes	%	±%
Conservative	Neville Patten	1,753	46.8	
Labour	John Potts	1,592	42.5	
Liberal Democrats	Brian Lewis	402	10.7	
Majority		161	4.3	
Turnout		3,747	35.8	

Penn
Party	Candidate	Votes	%	±%
Conservative	Benjamin Carpenter	2,249	55.4	
Labour	Barry Thomas	1,459	35.9	
Liberal Democrats	Paul Beeston	355	8.7	
Majority		790	19.5	
Turnout		4,063	40.9	

St Peter's
Party	Candidate	Votes	%	±%
Labour	Tersaim Singh	1,580	64.8	
Conservative	Nicholas Allen	518	21.2	
Liberal Democrats	Roger Gray	340	13.9	
Majority		1,062	43.6	
Turnout		2,438	25.0	

Spring Vale
Party	Candidate	Votes	%	±%
Liberal Democrats	Malcolm Gwinnett	2,055	59.3	
Labour	Rachel Shanks	1,178	34.0	
Conservative	Giuseppe Corbelli	234	6.7	
Majority		877	25.3	
Turnout		3,467	34.2	

Tettenhall Regis
Party	Candidate	Votes	%	±%
Conservative	Robert Ward	1,832	55.9	
Liberal Democrats	Laurence Mclean	841	25.7	
Labour	Carl Smith	602	18.4	
Majority		991	30.2	
Turnout		3,275	35.2	

Tettenhall Wightwick
Party	Candidate	Votes	%	±%
Conservative	Wendy Thompson	2,444	72.0	
Labour	James O'Grady	658	19.4	
Liberal Democrats	Philip Bennett	294	8.7	
Majority		1,786	52.6	
Turnout		3,396	36.7	

Wednesfield North
Party	Candidate	Votes	%	±%
Labour	Philip Bateman	1,589	53.5	
Conservative	John Jones	1,147	38.6	
Liberal Democrats	Carole Jenkins	121	4.1	
Liberal	Kate Hallmark	113	3.8	
Majority		442	14.9	
Turnout		2,970	32.4	

Wednesfield South
Party	Candidate	Votes	%	±%
Labour	Helen King	1,357	49.2	
Conservative	Simon Jevon	1,169	42.4	
Liberal Democrats	John Steatham	230	8.3	
Majority		188	6.8	
Turnout		2,756	30.9	
