= 1998 Bedford Borough Council election =

1998 UK local government election

The 1998 Bedford Borough Council election took place on 7 May 1998 to elect members of Bedford Borough Council in Bedfordshire, England. One third of the council was up for election and the council stayed under no overall control.

Prior to the election, two councillors left the Liberal Democrats group to sit as independents.

== Summary ==
=== Election result ===
1998 Bedford Borough Council election
| Party | This election | | | | Full council | | | This election | | |
| Party | Candidates | Seats | Net | Seats % | Other | Total | Total % | Votes | Votes % | +/− |
|---|---|---|---|---|---|---|---|---|---|---|
| Labour | {{{candidates}}} | 7 | Steady | 38.9 | 15 | 22 | 41.5 | 9,662 | 36.4 | –4.6 |
| Liberal Democrats | {{{candidates}}} | 6 | ▲1 | 33.3 | 9 | 15 | 28.3 | 7,414 | 28.0 | +1.7 |
| Conservative | {{{candidates}}} | 2 | ▼1 | 11.1 | 7 | 9 | 17.0 | 7,995 | 30.1 | +1.6 |
| Independent | {{{candidates}}} | 3 | Steady | 16.7 | 4 | 7 | 13.2 | 1,449 | 5.5 | +1.2 |

== Ward results ==
=== Brickhill ===
Brickhill
| Party | Candidate | Votes | % | ±% |
|---|---|---|---|---|
| Liberal Democrats | Charles Green* | 1,137 | 47.1 | –10.8 |
| Conservative | Eric Threapleton | 1,015 | 42.1 | +9.6 |
| Labour | Jason Potter | 260 | 10.8 | +1.3 |
| Majority | | 122 | 5.1 | |
| Turnout | | 2,412 | 41.8 | |
| Registered electors | | 5,784 | | |
| Liberal Democrats hold | | Swing | | |

=== Castle ===
Castle
| Party | Candidate | Votes | % | ±% |
|---|---|---|---|---|
| Labour | Apu Bagchi* | 900 | 54.0 | +13.6 |
| Conservative | Robert Rigby | 610 | 36.6 | +10.0 |
| Liberal Democrats | Stephen Lawson | 158 | 9.5 | −23.6 |
| Majority | | 290 | 17.4 | |
| Turnout | | 1,668 | 36.3 | |
| Registered electors | | 4,600 | | |
| Labour hold | | Swing | | |

=== Cauldwell ===
Cauldwell
| Party | Candidate | Votes | % | ±% |
|---|---|---|---|---|
| Labour | Elizabeth White* | 997 | 71.0 | –4.7 |
| Conservative | Gilbert Campbell | 211 | 15.0 | +1.9 |
| Liberal Democrats | Anita Gerard | 196 | 14.0 | +2.8 |
| Majority | | 786 | 56.0 | |
| Turnout | | 1,404 | 23.0 | |
| Registered electors | | 6,174 | | |
| Labour hold | | Swing | | |

=== De Parys ===
De Parys
| Party | Candidate | Votes | % | ±% |
|---|---|---|---|---|
| Liberal Democrats | John Graham* | 1,112 | 50.8 | –6.7 |
| Conservative | Terence Rigby | 767 | 35.1 | +7.6 |
| Labour | Charles Baily | 308 | 14.1 | –0.9 |
| Majority | | 345 | 15.8 | |
| Turnout | | 2,187 | 39.0 | |
| Registered electors | | 5,623 | | |
| Liberal Democrats hold | | Swing | | |

=== Felmersham ===
Felmersham
| Party | Candidate | Votes | % | ±% |
|---|---|---|---|---|
| Independent | Geoffrey Hulatt | 346 | 46.8 | N/A |
| Conservative | Dudley Hughes* | 253 | 34.2 | –13.6 |
| Labour | Roger Jackson | 72 | 9.7 | –5.9 |
| Liberal Democrats | Linda Borrett | 68 | 9.2 | –27.3 |
| Majority | | 93 | 12.6 | |
| Turnout | | 739 | 39.5 | |
| Registered electors | | 1,876 | | |
| Independent gain from Conservative | | Swing | | |

=== Goldington ===
Goldington
| Party | Candidate | Votes | % | ±% |
|---|---|---|---|---|
| Liberal Democrats | Paul Smith | 1,121 | 52.2 | −7.1 |
| Labour | Laurence Evans | 859 | 40.0 | +8.0 |
| Conservative | Valerie Fulford | 167 | 7.8 | –0.9 |
| Majority | | 262 | 12.2 | |
| Turnout | | 2,147 | 40.6 | |
| Registered electors | | 5,302 | | |
| Liberal Democrats hold | | Swing | | |

=== Harpur ===
Harpur
| Party | Candidate | Votes | % | ±% |
|---|---|---|---|---|
| Labour | Hazel Mitchell* | 848 | 57.6 | –4.2 |
| Conservative | Jean Pilgrim | 469 | 31.8 | +6.3 |
| Liberal Democrats | Susan Vogel | 156 | 10.6 | −2.1 |
| Majority | | 379 | 25.7 | |
| Turnout | | 1,473 | 24.4 | |
| Registered electors | | 6,067 | | |
| Labour hold | | Swing | | |

=== Harrold ===
Harrold
| Party | Candidate | Votes | % | ±% |
|---|---|---|---|---|
| Conservative | Martin Bridgman | 341 | 58.2 | +12.9 |
| Labour | Eleanor Falkner | 144 | 24.6 | N/A |
| Liberal Democrats | Christopher Hall | 101 | 17.2 | –37.5 |
| Majority | | 197 | 33.6 | |
| Turnout | | 586 | 28.2 | |
| Registered electors | | 2,089 | | |
| Conservative gain from Liberal Democrats | | Swing | | |

=== Kempston East ===
Kempston East
| Party | Candidate | Votes | % | ±% |
|---|---|---|---|---|
| Labour | Ray Oliver* | 1,141 | 60.9 | +4.6 |
| Conservative | Jagdish Singh | 515 | 27.5 | –3.8 |
| Liberal Democrats | Jacqueline Smithson | 218 | 11.6 | –2.5 |
| Majority | | 626 | 33.4 | |
| Turnout | | 1,874 | 25.9 | |
| Registered electors | | 7,285 | | |
| Labour hold | | Swing | | |

=== Kempston West ===
Kempston West
| Party | Candidate | Votes | % | ±% |
|---|---|---|---|---|
| Labour | Shan Hunt* | 856 | 55.6 | –0.2 |
| Conservative | Cecil Cove | 553 | 35.9 | +2.5 |
| Liberal Democrats | Ian White | 131 | 8.5 | –2.4 |
| Majority | | 303 | 19.7 | |
| Turnout | | 1,540 | 23.8 | |
| Registered electors | | 6,481 | | |
| Labour hold | | Swing | | |

=== Kingsbrook ===
Kingsbrook
| Party | Candidate | Votes | % | ±% |
|---|---|---|---|---|
| Labour | Elizabeth Luder* | 766 | 63.4 | –7.1 |
| Liberal Democrats | Martin Buddle | 254 | 21.0 | +6.0 |
| Conservative | Phillip Ashley | 189 | 15.6 | +1.1 |
| Majority | | 512 | 42.3 | |
| Turnout | | 1,209 | 24.4 | |
| Registered electors | | 4,959 | | |
| Labour hold | | Swing | | |

=== Newnham ===
Newnham
| Party | Candidate | Votes | % | ±% |
|---|---|---|---|---|
| Liberal Democrats | Andrew Russell | 641 | 36.3 | −11.2 |
| Conservative | Louise Kirke | 568 | 32.2 | –0.8 |
| Labour | Richard Crane | 557 | 31.5 | +12.0 |
| Majority | | 73 | 4.1 | |
| Turnout | | 1,766 | 35.1 | |
| Registered electors | | 5,033 | | |
| Liberal Democrats hold | | Swing | | |

=== Oakley ===
Oakley
| Party | Candidate | Votes | % | ±% |
|---|---|---|---|---|
| Independent | Patricia Olney* | 499 | 65.5 | +2.2 |
| Conservative | Domenico De Benedictis | 209 | 27.4 | −6.3 |
| Labour | Terence Carroll | 45 | 5.9 | N/A |
| Liberal Democrats | Robert Howker | 9 | 1.2 | −1.8 |
| Majority | | 290 | 38.1 | |
| Turnout | | 843 | 42.1 | |
| Registered electors | | 1,816 | | |
| Independent hold | | Swing | | |

=== Putnoe ===
Putnoe
| Party | Candidate | Votes | % | ±% |
|---|---|---|---|---|
| Liberal Democrats | Michael Headley* | 1,183 | 60.9 | +7.5 |
| Conservative | Paul Sinclair | 577 | 29.7 | −4.3 |
| Labour | Paban Sharma | 182 | 9.4 | –3.3 |
| Majority | | 606 | 31.2 | |
| Turnout | | 1,942 | 36.2 | |
| Registered electors | | 5,373 | | |
| Liberal Democrats hold | | Swing | | |

=== Queens Park ===
Queens Park
| Party | Candidate | Votes | % | ±% |
|---|---|---|---|---|
| Labour | Derek Jones* | 1,257 | 72.3 | −5.3 |
| Conservative | Janet Pilgrim | 274 | 15.8 | +3.0 |
| Liberal Democrats | Michael Murphy | 208 | 12.0 | +2.5 |
| Majority | | 983 | 56.5 | |
| Turnout | | 1,739 | 28.0 | |
| Registered electors | | 6,275 | | |
| Labour hold | | Swing | | |

=== Renhold ===
Renhold
| Party | Candidate | Votes | % | ±% |
|---|---|---|---|---|
| Conservative | Robert Harrison* | 555 | 74.0 | +10.6 |
| Labour | Robert Atkins | 113 | 15.1 | +5.2 |
| Liberal Democrats | Paul Stekelis | 82 | 10.9 | –15.8 |
| Majority | | 442 | 58.9 | |
| Turnout | | 750 | 40.6 | |
| Registered electors | | 1,857 | | |
| Conservative hold | | Swing | | |

=== Riseley ===
Riseley
| Party | Candidate | Votes | % | ±% |
|---|---|---|---|---|
| Independent | Ian Clifton* | 604 | 64.9 | +27.6 |
| Conservative | Arthur Foster | 233 | 25.0 | –8.7 |
| Labour | Adrien Beardmore | 48 | 5.2 | N/A |
| Liberal Democrats | Joanna Wood | 46 | 4.9 | –24.1 |
| Majority | | 371 | 39.8 | |
| Turnout | | 931 | 44.4 | |
| Registered electors | | 2,098 | | |
| Independent hold | | Swing | | |

=== Wilshamstead ===
Wilshamstead
| Party | Candidate | Votes | % | ±% |
|---|---|---|---|---|
| Liberal Democrats | Martin Parker | 593 | 42.6 | +26.3 |
| Conservative | Mark Haines | 489 | 35.2 | –11.6 |
| Labour | Daniel Bisset | 309 | 22.2 | –14.7 |
| Majority | | 104 | 7.5 | |
| Turnout | | 1,391 | 50.9 | |
| Registered electors | | 2,775 | | |
| Liberal Democrats gain from Conservative | | Swing | | |
