= 1998 Hull City Council election =

The 1998 Hull City Council election took place on 7 May 1998 to elect members of Hull City Council in England. One third of the council was up for election and the Labour Party kept overall control of the council.

In the run up to the election there was controversy as the local Labour Party was suspended by the National Party over claims of intimidation, nepotism and membership rigging. This controversy made the Liberal Democrats confident of making gains in the election, with the results bearing this out as Labour lost 4 seats on the council.

After the election, the composition of the council was:

- Labour 53
- Liberal Democrat 4
- Independent 2
- Conservative 1

== Election result ==
Hull local election result 1998
Party	Seats	Gains	Losses	Net gain/loss	Seats %	Votes %	Votes	+/−
Labour	15			-4	75.0	51.3		
Liberal Democrats	2			+2	10.0	26.6		
Independent	2			+1	10.0			
Conservative	1			+1	5.0	15.4		
