= 1998 Broxbourne Borough Council election =

1998 UK local government election

The Broxbourne Council election, 1998 was held to elect council members of the Broxbourne Borough Council, the local government authority of the borough of Broxbourne, Hertfordshire, England.

== Composition of expiring seats before election ==
Ward	Party	Incumbent Elected	Incumbent	Standing again?
Broxbourne	Conservative	1994	Don Smith	Yes (Note: Don Smith stood in Flamstead End Ward in 1998.)
Bury Green	Conservative	1994	Geoffrey Morris	No
Cheshunt Central	Liberal Democrats	1994	Robert Smith	Yes
Cheshunt North	Conservative	1994	Don Poole	Yes (Note: Don Poole stood in Broxbourne Ward in 1998.)
Flamstead End	Conservative	1994	Sheila Kendall	Yes (Note: Sheila Kendall stood in Cheshunt Central Ward in 1998.)
Goffs Oak	Conservative	1994	Marie Dowsett	Yes
Hoddesdon North	Conservative	1994	Michael Lavender	Yes
Hoddesdon Town	Liberal Democrats	1994	Dorothy Morgan	No
Rosedale	Liberal Democrats	1994	Carolyn Iles	Yes (Note: Carolyn Iles stood in as a Labour Party candidate in 1998.)
Rye Park	Labour	1994	Linda Dambrauskas	No
Theobalds	Labour	1994	Lester Hickling	Yes (Note: Lester Hickling stood in Cheshunt North Ward in 1998.)
Waltham Cross North	Conservative	1994	Norman Ames	Yes
Waltham Cross South	Labour	1994	Mark Farrington	Yes
Wormley & Turnford	Conservative	1994	Brian Hill	Yes

== Election results ==
Broxbourne local election result 1998
Party	Seats	Gains	Losses	Net gain/loss	Seats %	Votes %	Votes	+/−
Conservative	13	5	0	+5	92.85	53.70	8,920	
Labour	1	0	2	-2	7.15	33.12	5,501	
Liberal Democrats	0	0	3	-3	0.00	11.76	1,953	
Independent	0	0	0	0	0.00	1.42	236	

== Results summary ==
An election was held in 14 wards on 7 May 1998.

The Conservative Party gained 5 council seats at this election taking 3 seats from the Liberal Democrats in Cheshunt Central Ward, Hoddesdon Town Ward and Rosedale Ward and taking 2 seats from the Labour Party in Rye Park Ward and Theobalds Ward.

Since the last Broxbourne Local Government Election in 1996 a by-election had been held in Waltham Cross North Ward that had resulted in a gain for the Conservatives at the expense of Labour. Additionally a Liberal Democrat Councillor had "crossed the floor" of the chamber and had joined the Conservative Group.

This was the last Broxbourne local election fought before new electoral boundaries took effect in 1999.

The boundary changes would necessitate an "all out" election in 1999 when all of the 38 "new" seats would be contested.

Accordingly, all councillors elected in 1998 served a 1-year term of office.

The political balance of the new council following this election was:

- Conservative 31 seats
- Labour 11 seats

== Ward results ==
Broxbourne Ward Result 7 May 1998
Party	Candidate	Votes	%	±%
Conservative	Donald Poole	845	58.88	
Labour	Robert Foskett	284	19.79	
Liberal Democrats	Deborah Gibson	189	13.17	
Independent	Raymond Stone	117	8.16	
Majority		561		
Turnout		1,435	24.00	
Conservative hold		Swing		

Bury Green Ward Result 7 May 1998
Party	Candidate	Votes	%	±%
Conservative	Dennis Clayton	835	49.76	
Labour	Linda Dambrauskas	766	45.65	
Liberal Democrats	Henry Appiah	77	4.59	
Majority		69		
Turnout		1,678	30.00	
Conservative hold		Swing		

Cheshunt Central Ward Result 7 May 1998
Party	Candidate	Votes	%	±%
Conservative	Sheila Kendall	576	53.33	
Labour	James Emslie	255	23.62	
Liberal Democrats	Robert Smith	249	23.05	
Majority		321		
Turnout		1,080	29.00	
Conservative gain from Liberal Democrats		Swing		

Cheshunt North Ward Result 7 May 1998
Party	Candidate	Votes	%	±%
Conservative	Leonard Merry	651	47.73	
Labour	Lester Hickling	622	45.60	
Liberal Democrats	Michael Gould	91	6.67	
Majority		29		
Turnout		1,364	24.00	
Conservative hold		Swing		

Flamstead End Ward Result 7 May 1998
Party	Candidate	Votes	%	±%
Conservative	Donald Smith	762	57.99	
Labour	George Panayiotopoulos	357	27.17	
Liberal Democrats	Patricia Blackshaw	195	14.84	
Majority		405		
Turnout		1,314	24.00	
Conservative hold		Swing		

Goffs Oak Ward Result 7 May 1998
Party	Candidate	Votes	%	±%
Conservative	Marie Dowsett	815	71.68	
Labour	Ronald McCole	146	12.84	
Independent	Christopher Stone	94	8.27	
Liberal Democrats	Jacqueline Barton	82	7.21	
Majority		669		
Turnout		1,137	29.00	
Conservative hold		Swing		

Hoddesdon North Ward Result 7 May 1998
Party	Candidate	Votes	%	±%
Conservative	William Cooper	733	59.65	
Liberal Democrats	Anthoney Fey	261	21.23	
Labour	Keith Hodge	235	19.12	
Majority		472		
Turnout		1,229	24.00	
Conservative hold		Swing		

Hoddesdon Town Ward Result 7 May 1998
Party	Candidate	Votes	%	±%
Conservative	Kenneth Ayling	694	56.84	
Labour	Janet Kousoulou	322	26.37	
Liberal Democrats	Heather Campbell	205	16.79	
Majority		372		
Turnout		1,221	24.00	
Conservative gain from Liberal Democrats		Swing		

Rosedale Ward Result 7 May 1998
Party	Candidate	Votes	%	±%
Conservative	Mandy Hayward	339	44.14	
Liberal Democrats	Trevor Griffiths	220	28.65	
Labour	Carolyn Iles	209	27.21	
Majority		119		
Turnout		768	26.00	
Conservative gain from Liberal Democrats		Swing		

Rye Park Ward Result 7 May 1998
Party	Candidate	Votes	%	±%
Conservative	David Hale	636	46.87	
Labour	Peter Kort	610	44.95	
Liberal Democrats	Peter Huse	111	8.18	
Majority		26		
Turnout		1,357	27.00	
Conservative gain from Labour		Swing		

Theobalds Ward Result 7 May 1998
Party	Candidate	Votes	%	±%
Conservative	Dorothy Edmonds	627	53.41	
Labour	Winifred Press	458	39.01	
Liberal Democrats	James Tait	89	7.58	
Majority		169		
Turnout		1,174	29.00	
Conservative gain from Labour		Swing		

Waltham Cross North Ward Result 7 May 1998
Party	Candidate	Votes	%	±%
Conservative	Norman Ames	619	62.21	
Labour	Christopher Simonovitch	310	31.16	
Liberal Democrats	Cynthia Appiah	41	4.12	
Independent	Alan Gater	25	2.51	
Majority		309		
Turnout		995	31.00	
Conservative hold		Swing		

Waltham Cross South Ward Result 7 May 1998
Party	Candidate	Votes	%	±%
Labour	Mark Farrington	501	54.99	
Conservative	Josephine Hornsey	338	37.11	
Liberal Democrats	Eithne Ormerod	72	7.90	
Majority		163		
Turnout		911	20.00	
Labour hold		Swing		

Wormley / Turnford Ward Result 7 May 1998
Party	Candidate	Votes	%	±%
Conservative	Brian Hill	450	47.52	
Labour	Marian Podlubny	426	44.98	
Liberal Democrats	Nicholas Garton	71	7.50	
Majority		24		
Turnout		947	20.00	
Conservative hold		Swing		
