= 1998 Worcester City Council election =

English local election

The 1998 Worcester City Council election took place on 7 May 1998 to elect members of Worcester City Council in Worcestershire, England. One third of the council was up for election and the Labour Party stayed in overall control of the council.

After the election, the composition of the council was:

- Labour 22
- Conservative 10
- Liberal Democrat 2
- Independent 2

== Background ==
Before the election the council had 22 Labour, 9 Conservative, 3 Liberal Democrat and 1 independent members with 1 seat vacant. 13 seats were for up for election with the expectation before the election that no change in control of the council was likely.

The run up to the election saw controversy over the mayor Margaret Layland who had admitted to having an affair with her chauffeur. She was suspended by the Labour party but refused to stand down. Her husband Colin Layland, also a councillor, was suspended as well leading to him standing as an independent in St John ward and being opposed by an official Labour party candidate.

== Election result ==
The results saw Labour hold on to their majority on the council after winning 8 of the 13 seats contested. The Conservatives won 3 seats, while the Liberal Democrats and Independents won 1 each. Colin Layland was defeated in St John ward by the Labour candidate.

Worcester local election result 1998
Party	Seats	Gains	Losses	Net gain/loss	Seats %	Votes %	Votes	+/−
Labour	8			-1	61.5	38.5		
Conservative	3			+1	23.1	35.2		
Liberal Democrats	1			-1	7.7	16.9		
Independent	1			+1	7.7			
