= 1998 Tandridge District Council election =

1998 UK local government election

The 1998 Tandridge District Council election took place on 7 May 1998 to elect members of Tandridge District Council in Surrey, England. One third of the council was up for election and the council stayed under no overall control.

After the election, the composition of the council was

- Liberal Democrat 18
- Conservative 17
- Labour 7

== Election result ==
Tandridge local election result 1998
Party	Seats	Gains	Losses	Net gain/loss	Seats %	Votes %	Votes	+/−
Liberal Democrats	7			-1	43.8			
Conservative	7			+1	43.8			
Labour	2			0	12.5			
