= 1998 Salford City Council election =

1998 election

The 1998 Salford Council election took place on 7 May 1998 to elect members of Salford Metropolitan Borough Council in Greater Manchester, England. One-third of the council was up for election and the Labour Party kept overall control of the council. Overall turnout was 19.39%.

After the election, the composition of the council was:

- Labour 57
- Liberal Democrat 3

== Election result ==
Salford local election result 1998
Party	Seats	Gains	Losses	Net gain/loss	Seats %	Votes %	Votes	+/−
Labour	20			0	95.2	61.5	20,505	
Liberal Democrats	1			0	4.8	19.5	6,488	
Conservative	0			0	0	18.7	6,237	
No Confidence Group	0			0	0	0.3	95	

== Ward results ==
Barton
Party	Candidate	Votes	%	±%
Labour	Robert Carter	1,100	77.3	
Conservative	Ruth Brook	179	12.6	
Liberal Democrats	David Cowpe	144	10.1	
Majority		921	64.7	
Turnout		1,423	18.2	

Blackfriars
Party	Candidate	Votes	%	±%
Labour	Joseph Murphy	622	78.7	
Liberal Democrats	Susan Carson	107	13.5	
Conservative	Wendy Powell	61	7.7	
Majority		515	65.2	
Turnout		790	13.5	

Broughton
Party	Candidate	Votes	%	±%
Labour	John Merry	818	75.0	
Conservative	Robert Marshall	141	12.9	
Liberal Democrats	Sheilah Wallace	132	12.1	
Majority		677	62.1	
Turnout		1,091	17.5	

Cadishead
Party	Candidate	Votes	%	±%
Labour	Arnold Holt	878	61.9	
Conservative	Thomas Holt	410	28.9	
Liberal Democrats	Tony Gillings	130	9.2	
Majority		468	33.0	
Turnout		1,404	21.5	

Claremont
Party	Candidate	Votes	%	±%
Labour	Peter Grimshaw	995	46.5	
Liberal Democrats	Norman Owen	774	36.2	
Conservative	George Herrick	369	17.3	
Majority		221	10.3	
Turnout		2,138	21.5	

Eccles
Party	Candidate	Votes	%	±%
Labour	Charles Johnson	1,163	61.0	
Conservative	John Marshall	410	21.5	
Liberal Democrats	Graham Bates	335	17.6	
Majority		753	39.5	
Turnout		1,908	20.8	

Irlam
Party	Candidate	Votes	%	±%
Labour	Joseph Kean	1,128	80.3	
Liberal Democrats	Julie Wenham	276	19.7	
Majority		852	60.6	
Turnout		1,404	19.6	

Kersal
Party	Candidate	Votes	%	±%
Labour	Peter Connor	1,321	68.6	
Conservative	Rufus Heron	474	24.6	
Liberal Democrats	Lynn Drake	130	6.8	
Majority		847	44.0	
Turnout		1,925	22.1	

Langworthy
Party	Candidate	Votes	%	±%
Labour	Andrew Salmon	723	71.9	
Liberal Democrats	Bernard Carson	122	12.1	
No Confidence Group	John Copeland	95	9.4	
Conservative	Ian Matthews	66	6.6	
Majority		601	59.8	
Turnout		1,006	15.2	

Little Hulton (2)
Party	Candidate	Votes	%	±%
Labour	Doris Fernandez	859		
Labour	Marion Wordsworth	755		
Conservative	David Stirrup	226		
Conservative	Robert McHale	209		
Liberal Democrats	Yvonne Dippnall	117		
Liberal Democrats	Edward Dippnall	109		
Turnout		2,275	17.0	

Ordsall
Party	Candidate	Votes	%	±%
Labour	Sydney Turner	486	83.2	
Liberal Democrats	Neil Ratcliffe	50	8.6	
Conservative	David Mitchell	48	8.2	
Majority		436	74.6	
Turnout		584	11.1	

Pendlebury
Party	Candidate	Votes	%	±%
Labour	Barry Warner	1,466	72.9	
Conservative	Marjorie Weston	300	14.9	
Liberal Democrats	Christine Kay	244	12.1	
Majority		1,166	58.0	
Turnout		2,010	19.0	

Pendleton
Party	Candidate	Votes	%	±%
Labour	James Hulmes	890	75.8	
Liberal Democrats	John Gray	167	14.2	
Conservative	Hillary Lingard	117	10.0	
Majority		723	61.6	
Turnout		1,174	16.0	

Swinton North
Party	Candidate	Votes	%	±%
Labour	Derek Antrobus	1,209	68.9	
Conservative	Neil Levay	301	17.2	
Liberal Democrats	Nina Richards	245	14.0	
Majority		908	51.7	
Turnout		1,755	19.3	

Swinton South
Party	Candidate	Votes	%	±%
Labour	Keith Mann	997	49.7	
Conservative	Christine Upton	672	33.5	
Liberal Democrats	Paul Gregory	339	16.9	
Majority		325	16.2	
Turnout		2,008	20.2	

Walkden North
Party	Candidate	Votes	%	±%
Labour	William Pennington	1,185	79.4	
Conservative	Phillip Hall	158	10.6	
Liberal Democrats	Michael Wilde	149	10.0	
Majority		1,027	68.8	
Turnout		1,492	17.4	

Walkden South
Party	Candidate	Votes	%	±%
Labour	Valerie Burgoyne	1,296	54.7	
Conservative	John Mosley	582	24.6	
Liberal Democrats	Adrian McDermott	490	20.7	
Majority		806	30.1	
Turnout		2,368	20.0	

Weaste & Seedley
Party	Candidate	Votes	%	±%
Labour	Anthony Ullman	944	56.3	
Liberal Democrats	Neville Rogers	387	23.1	
Conservative	Sydney Cooper	345	20.6	
Majority		557	33.2	
Turnout		1,676	21.7	

Winton
Party	Candidate	Votes	%	±%
Labour	Vincent Prior	1,113	69.5	
Conservative	Patricia Kershaw	267	16.7	
Liberal Democrats	William Wain	221	13.8	
Majority		846	52.8	
Turnout		1,601	17.2	

Worsley & Boothstown
Party	Candidate	Votes	%	±%
Liberal Democrats	Robert Boyd	1,820	55.5	
Conservative	Karen Garrido	902	27.5	
Labour	Eric Burgoyne	557	17.0	
Majority		918	28.0	
Turnout		3,279	29.7	
