= 1998 Adur District Council election =

1998 UK local government election

The 1998 Adur District Council election took place on 7 May 1998 to elect members of Adur District Council in West Sussex, England. One third of the council was up for election and the Liberal Democrats stayed in overall control of the council.

After the election, the composition of the council was:

- Liberal Democrat 22
- Labour 10
- Conservative 5
- Independent 2

== Results ==
Adur local election result 1998
Party	Seats	Gains	Losses	Net gain/loss	Seats %	Votes %	Votes	+/−
Liberal Democrats	6			-6	42.9			
Labour	5			+4	35.7			
Conservative	2			+2	14.3			
Independent	1			0	7.1			
