= 1998 Newcastle City Council election =

1998 UK local government election

- 7 May 2024

28 out of 78 seats to Newcastle City Council (including 2 by-elections) 40 seats needed for a majority
- Turnout: 22.1%
	Majority party	Minority party
Party	Labour	Liberal Democrats
Seats before	65	13
Seats won	23	5
Seats after	65	13
Seat change	Steady	Steady
Popular vote	26,889	14,271
Percentage	54.0%	28.6%
Swing	▼4.3%	▲3.3%

The 1998 Newcastle City Council election took place on 7 May 1998 to elect members of Newcastle upon Tyne Metropolitan Borough Council in Tyne and Wear, England. One third of the council was up for election and the Labour Party stayed in overall control of the council.

After the election, the composition of the council was:

- Labour 65
- Liberal Democrat 13

== Election result ==
1998 Newcastle City Council elections
Party	This election			Full council			This election		
Party	Seats	Net	Seats %	Other	Total	Total %	Votes	Votes %	+/−
Labour	23	Steady	82.1	42	65	83.3	26,889	54.0	▼4.3
Liberal Democrats	5	Steady	17.9	8	13	16.7	14,271	28.6	▲3.3
Conservative	0	Steady	0.0	0	0	0.0	7,468	15.0	▲0.4
Green	0	Steady	0.0	0	0	0.0	1,066	2.1	▲0.8
Socialist Labour	0	Steady	0.0	0	0	0.0	96	0.2	New
Communist	0	Steady	0.0	0	0	0.0	43	0.1	Steady

== Ward results ==
=== Benwell ===
Benwell
Party	Candidate	Votes	%	±%
Labour	J. Beecham	674	74.4	
Conservative	M. Tulip	163	18.0	
Liberal Democrats	A. Latif	69	7.6	
Turnout			16.0	

=== Blakelaw ===
Blakelaw
Party	Candidate	Votes	%	±%
Liberal Democrats	G. Keating	1,447	51.0	
Labour	F. Copley	1,281	45.1	
Conservative	K. Gilfillan	110	3.9	
Turnout			31.3	

=== Byker ===
Byker
Party	Candidate	Votes	%	±%
Labour	T. Russell	802	75.6	
Liberal Democrats	T. Thompson	201	18.9	
Conservative	M. Best	58	5.5	
Turnout			15.8	

=== Castle ===
Castle
Party	Candidate	Votes	%	±%
Liberal Democrats	I. Graham	1,726	61.1	
Labour	E. Mackinlay	735	26.0	
Conservative	C. Smith	366	12.9	
Turnout			31.6	

=== Dene ===
Dene
Party	Candidate	Votes	%	±%
Liberal Democrats	R. Renton	2,150	55.5	
Labour	J. Young	1,193	30.8	
Conservative	A. Gingell	530	13.7	
Turnout			33.8	

=== Denton ===
Denton
Party	Candidate	Votes	%	±%
Labour	M. Carr	1,159	75.4	
Liberal Democrats	D. Down	220	14.3	
Conservative	A. Birkmyre	159	10.3	
Turnout			19.3	

=== Elswick ===
Elswick
Party	Candidate	Votes	%	±%
Labour	S. Khan	716	69.2	
Liberal Democrats	S. Mansfield	177	17.1	
Conservative	L. Neave	142	13.7	
Turnout			17.5	

=== Fawdon ===
Fawdon
Party	Candidate	Votes	%	±%
Labour	K. Taylor	1,257	67.0	
Liberal Democrats	M. Rook	454	24.2	
Conservative	F. Kirkby	166	8.8	
Turnout			24.9	

=== Fenham ===
Fenham
Party	Candidate	Votes	%	±%
Labour	G. Johnson	1,349	67.3	
Conservative	K. Wake	427	21.3	
Liberal Democrats	J. Mansfield	228	11.4	
Turnout			24.1	

=== Grange ===
Grange
Party	Candidate	Votes	%	±%
Liberal Democrats	B. Moore	1,895	68.5	
Labour	H. Jackson	606	21.9	
Conservative	E. McQueen	267	9.6	
Turnout			28.3	

=== Heaton ===
Heaton
Party	Candidate	Votes	%	±%
Labour	D. Price	896	51.8	
Conservative	J. Middleton	252	14.6	
Liberal Democrats	S. Psallidas	231	13.4	
Green	C. Hayday	211	12.2	
Socialist Labour	B. Carpenter	96	5.6	
Communist	M. Levy	43	2.5	
Turnout			18.9	

=== Jesmond ===
Jesmond
Party	Candidate	Votes	%	±%
Labour	I. Owens	993	37.5	
Conservative	S. Gilfillan	724	27.4	
Liberal Democrats	R. Walker	657	24.8	
Green	A. Lipman	273	10.3	
Turnout			25.6	

=== Kenton ===
Kenton
Party	Candidate	Votes	%	±%
Labour	G. Ormonde	1,203	57.7	
Conservative	H. Turner	568	27.2	
Liberal Democrats	G. Stone	235	11.3	
Green	J. Cotton	80	3.8	
Turnout			27.1	

=== Lemington ===
Lemington
Party	Candidate	Votes	%	±%
Labour	B. Phillipson	1,041	74.9	
Conservative	E. Graham	183	13.2	
Liberal Democrats	M. Coulthard	165	11.9	
Turnout			17.9	

=== Monkchester ===
Monkchester
Party	Candidate	Votes	%	±%
Labour	C. Gray	968	84.5	
Liberal Democrats	F. Beare	121	10.6	
Conservative	N. Best	56	4.9	
Turnout			18.3	

=== Moorside ===
Moorside
Party	Candidate	Votes	%	±%
Labour	T. Wilson	569	54.6	
Conservative	M. Blenkinsop	227	21.8	
Liberal Democrats	D. Besag	127	12.2	
Green	P. Hilton	119	11.4	
Turnout			11.9	

=== Newburn ===
Newburn
Party	Candidate	Votes	%	±%
Labour	M. Nixon	1,050	70.9	
Liberal Democrats	C. Findlay	220	14.9	
Conservative	A. Hind	210	14.2	
Turnout			21.1	

=== Sandyford ===
Sandyford (2 seats due to by-election)
Party	Candidate	Votes	%	±%
Labour	S. Spencer	1,126	50.6	
Labour	H. Sen	1,076	-	
Liberal Democrats	L. McKeever	428	19.2	
Green	D. Shepherdson	383	17.2	
Conservative	N. Cartmell	289	13.0	
Turnout			19.8	

=== Scotswood ===
Scotswood
Party	Candidate	Votes	%	±%
Labour	D. Bedford	685	80.0	
Liberal Democrats	J. Burt	95	11.1	
Conservative	M. Pratt	76	8.9	
Turnout			17.0	

=== South Gosforth ===
South Gosforth
Party	Candidate	Votes	%	±%
Liberal Democrats	R. Douthwaite	1,554	54.8	
Conservative	C. Forster	771	27.2	
Labour	M. Lydon	511	18.0	
Turnout			33.4	

=== Walker ===
Walker
Party	Candidate	Votes	%	±%
Labour	G. Douglas	866	84.9	
Liberal Democrats	D. Cain	154	15.1	
Turnout			16.9	

=== Walkergate ===
Walkergate
Party	Candidate	Votes	%	±%
Labour	M. Wood	1,145	57.7	
Liberal Democrats	C. Wood	661	33.3	
Conservative	A. Dawson	177	8.9	
Turnout			25.0	

=== West City ===
West City
Party	Candidate	Votes	%	±%
Labour	D. James	523	76.7	
Liberal Democrats	P. Lower	86	12.6	
Conservative	M. Kelly	73	10.7	
Turnout			12.4	

=== Westerhope ===
Westerhope (2 seats due to by-election)
Party	Candidate	Votes	%	±%
Labour	J. Angus	1,412	51.6	
Labour	P. Brannen	1,321	-	
Conservative	T. Troman	817	29.9	
Liberal Democrats	G. Horey	506	18.5	
Turnout			24.7	

=== Wingrove ===
Wingrove
Party	Candidate	Votes	%	±%
Labour	Z. Khan	1,049	58.1	
Conservative	M. Johnson	506	28.0	
Liberal Democrats	N. Bradbury	249	13.8	
Turnout			22.8	

=== Woolsington ===
Wingrove
Party	Candidate	Votes	%	±%
Labour	L. Kennedy	683	65.1	
Liberal Democrats	S. Ramsey	215	20.5	
Conservative	C. Forster	151	14.4	
Turnout			18.1	
