= 1998 Swale Borough Council election =

1998 UK local government election

The 1998 Swale Borough Council election took place on 7 May 1998 to elect members of Swale Borough Council in Kent, England. One third of the council was up for election and the council remained under no overall control.

After the election, the composition of the council was

- Liberal Democrats 22
- Labour 19
- Conservative 7
- Independent 1

== Election result ==
Swale local election result 1998
Party	Seats	Gains	Losses	Net gain/loss	Seats %	Votes %	Votes	+/−
Liberal Democrats	7			-1	43.8			
Labour	7			0	43.8			
Conservative	2			+1	43.8			
