= 1998 Carlisle City Council election =

1998 UK local government election

The 1998 Carlisle City Council election took place on 7 May 1998 to elect members of Carlisle District Council in Cumbria, England. One third of the council was up for election and the Labour Party stayed in overall control of the council.

After the election, the composition of the council was:

- Labour 33
- Conservative 14
- Liberal Democrats 3
- Independent 1

== Election result ==
Carlisle local election result 1998
| Party | Seats | Gains | Losses | Net gain/loss | Seats % | Votes % | Votes | +/− |
|---|---|---|---|---|---|---|---|---|
| Labour | 10 | | | 0 | 55.6 | | | |
| Conservative | 6 | | | 0 | 33.3 | | | |
| Liberal Democrats | 1 | | | 0 | 5.6 | | | |
| Independent | 1 | | | 0 | 5.6 | | | |
