= 1998 Worthing Borough Council election =

1998 UK local government election

The 1998 Worthing Borough Council election took place on 7 May 1998 to elect members of Worthing Borough Council in West Sussex, England. One third of the council was up for election and the Liberal Democrat party kept overall control of the council.

After the election, the composition of the council was:

- Liberal Democrat 21
- Conservative 15

== Election result ==
Worthing local election result 1998
Party	Seats	Gains	Losses	Net gain/loss	Seats %	Votes %	Votes	+/−
Conservative	6			+3	50.0	51.4		
Liberal Democrats	6			-3	50.0	37.1		
Labour	0			0	0	10.5		
