= 1998 Rochdale Metropolitan Borough Council election =

1998 UK local government election

Elections to Rochdale Council were held on 7 May 1998. One third of the council was up for election and the Labour Party kept overall control of the council where they defeated the Liberal Democrats in 1996.

After the election, the composition of the council was:

- Labour 36
- Liberal Democrat 18
- Conservative 6

== Election result ==
Rochdale local election result 1998
Party	Seats	Gains	Losses	Net gain/loss	Seats %	Votes %	Votes	+/−
Labour	11			0	55.0			
Liberal Democrats	7			0	35.0			
Conservative	2			0	10.0			
