= 1999 Hart District Council election =

1999 UK local government election

The 1999 Hart Council election took place on 6 May 1999 to elect members of Hart District Council in Hampshire, England. One third of the council was up for election and the council stayed under no overall control.

After the election, the composition of the council was:

- Conservative 16
- Liberal Democrat 14
- Independent 5

== Election result ==
Hart local election result 1999
Party	Seats	Gains	Losses	Net gain/loss	Seats %	Votes %	Votes	+/−
Conservative	7			+2	53.8	47.0	6,727	+11.0
Liberal Democrats	5			-1	38.5	37.0	5,305	+6.7
Independent	1			-1	7.7	6.3	896	-18.7
Labour	0	0	0	0	0.0	9.8	1,400	+1.1

== Ward results ==
Blackwater and Hawley
Party	Candidate	Votes	%	±%
Liberal Democrats	Edward Floyd	516	53.9	+4.7
Conservative	Suzanne Barrell	442	46.1	+5.8
Majority		74	7.7	−1.2
Turnout		958		

Church Crookham
Party	Candidate	Votes	%	±%
Conservative	Rosemary Feltham	802	47.2	+3.1
Liberal Democrats	John Weedon	756	44.5	−0.3
Labour	Hugh Meredith	140	8.2	−2.9
Majority		46	2.7	
Turnout		1,698		

Fleet Courtmoor
Party	Candidate	Votes	%	±%
Conservative	Carol Leversha	906	66.2	+6.0
Liberal Democrats	Kathleen Weedon	310	22.7	+22.7
Labour	Sheila Stone	152	11.1	+0.3
Majority		596	43.6	+12.4
Turnout		1,368		

Fleet Pondtail
Party	Candidate	Votes	%	±%
Conservative	Lucinda Ellis	1,067	64.1	+25.0
Liberal Democrats	Jeffrey Smith	359	21.6	+21.6
Labour	Peter Cotton	238	14.3	+4.2
Majority		708	42.5	
Turnout		1,664		

Fleet West
Party	Candidate	Votes	%	±%
Ind. Conservative	John Stocks	896	62.4	−4.0
Liberal Democrats	Richard Robinson	373	26.0	+3.8
Labour	Shirley Dearman	166	11.6	+0.2
Majority		523	36.4	−7.8
Turnout		1,435		

Frogmore and Darby Green
Party	Candidate	Votes	%	±%
Liberal Democrats	Robert Harward	531	62.0	−3.5
Conservative	Edward Bromhead	216	25.2	+5.6
Labour	John Davies	110	12.8	−1.1
Majority		315	36.8	−10.1
Turnout		857		

Hartley Wintney
Party	Candidate	Votes	%	±%
Conservative	Mark Sallis	929	76.9	+76.9
Liberal Democrats	Mark Stokes	160	13.2	−0.5
Labour	Janet Carrier	119	9.9	+9.9
Majority		769	63.7	
Turnout		1,208		

Hook
Party	Candidate	Votes	%	±%
Conservative	Roberta Flowers	734	49.3	+6.5
Liberal Democrats	Anthony Over	590	39.6	−17.6
Labour	Alan Partridge	165	11.1	+11.1
Majority		144	9.7	
Turnout		1,489		

Odiham
Party	Candidate	Votes	%	±%
Conservative	Robert Benford	693	69.8	
Liberal Democrats	David Evans	162	16.3	
Labour	David Carrier	138	13.9	
Majority		531	53.5	
Turnout		993		

Whitewater
Party	Candidate	Votes	%	±%
Conservative	Jonathan Glen	360	82.9	
Liberal Democrats	David Neighbour	74	17.1	
Majority		286	65.9	
Turnout		434		

Yateley East
Party	Candidate	Votes	%	±%
Liberal Democrats	Ann Kern	496	68.1	
Conservative	Edward Dawson	232	31.9	
Majority		264	36.3	
Turnout		728		

Yateley North
Party	Candidate	Votes	%	±%
Liberal Democrats	Maria Armstrong	413	65.1	
Conservative	James Ross	154	24.3	
Labour	Keith Spendlove	67	10.6	
Majority		259	40.9	
Turnout		634		

Yateley West
Party	Candidate	Votes	%	±%
Liberal Democrats	Alan Hammersley	565	65.5	+6.9
Conservative	David Ashworth	192	22.3	−4.6
Labour	Robert Greenwell	105	12.2	−2.3
Majority		373	43.3	+11.6
Turnout		862		
