= 1998 Great Yarmouth Borough Council election =

1998 UK local government election

The 1998 Great Yarmouth Borough Council election took place on 7 May 1998 to elect members of Great Yarmouth Borough Council in Norfolk, England. One third of the council was up for election and the Labour Party stayed in overall control of the council.

After the election, the composition of the council was:

- Labour 36
- Conservative 12

== Election result ==
Great Yarmouth local election result 1998
| Party | Seats | Gains | Losses | Net gain/loss | Seats % | Votes % | Votes | +/− |
|---|---|---|---|---|---|---|---|---|
| Labour | 11 | | | -1 | 68.8 | | | |
| Conservative | 5 | | | +2 | 31.3 | | | |
| Liberal Democrats | 0 | | | -1 | 0 | | | |
