= 1998 Rugby Borough Council election =

1998 UK local government election

Elections to Rugby Borough Council were held on 7 May 1998. One third of the council seats were up for election. The council stayed under no overall control. The number of councillors for each party after the election were Labour 22, Conservative 12, Liberal Democrat 5, Residents 5 and Independent 4.

== Election result ==
Rugby local election result 1998
Party	Seats	Gains	Losses	Net gain/loss	Seats %	Votes %	Votes	+/−
Labour	8			0	47.1			
Conservative	3			+1	17.6			
Liberal Democrats	2			0	11.8			
Residents	2			-1	11.8			
Independent	2			0	11.8			
