= 1998 Amber Valley Borough Council election =

1998 UK local government election

The 1998 Amber Valley Borough Council election took place on 7 May 1998 to elect members of Amber Valley Borough Council in Derbyshire, England. One third of the council was up for election and the Labour party kept overall control of the council.

After the election, the composition of the council was

- Labour 37
- Conservative 6

== Election result ==
Amber Valley local election result 1998
Party	Seats	Gains	Losses	Net gain/loss	Seats %	Votes %	Votes	+/−
Labour	11			-1	78.6			
Conservative	3			+1	21.4			
