= 1998 Purbeck District Council election =

1998 UK local government election

Elections to Purbeck District Council were held on 7 May 1998. One third of the council was up for election and the council stayed under no overall control.

After the election, the composition of the council was:

- Liberal Democrat 8
- Conservative 6
- Independent 5
- Labour 3

== Election result ==
Purbeck local election result 1998
Party	Seats	Gains	Losses	Net gain/loss	Seats %	Votes %	Votes	+/−
Independent	4			0	50.0			
Conservative	3			+3	37.5			
Liberal Democrats	1			-3	12.5			
