= 1998 Havant Borough Council election =

1998 UK local government election

The 1998 Havant Borough Council election took place on 7 May 1998 to elect members of Havant Borough Council in Hampshire, England. One third of the council was up for election and the council stayed under no overall control.

After the election, the composition of the council was

- Liberal Democrats 14
- Conservative 14
- Labour 8
- Independent 3
- Others 3

== Election result ==
Overall turnout at the election was 28%.

Havant local election result 1998
Party	Seats	Gains	Losses	Net gain/loss	Seats %	Votes %	Votes	+/−
Liberal Democrats	6			-3	40.0			
Conservative	6			+3	40.0			
Labour	3			+1	20.0			
Others	0			-1	0			
