= 1998 Doncaster Metropolitan Borough Council election =

1998 UK local government election

Elections to Doncaster Metropolitan Borough Council were held on 7 May 1998. One third of the council was up for election and the Labour party kept overall control of the council.

After the election, the composition of the council was

- Labour 47
- Independent 7
- Liberal Democrat 6
- Conservative 3

== Election result ==
Doncaster local election result 1998
Party	Seats	Gains	Losses	Net gain/loss	Seats %	Votes %	Votes	+/−
Labour	12			-3	57.1			
Independent	4			+2	19.0			
Liberal Democrats	3			+3	14.3			
Conservative	2			+1	9.5			
Others	0			-3	0			
