= 1998 Bury Metropolitan Borough Council election =

1998 UK local government election

Elections to Bury Council were held on 7 May 1998. One third of the council was up for election and the Labour Party kept overall control of the council. Overall turnout was 26.85%.

After the election, the composition of the council was:

- Labour 39
- Conservative 6
- Liberal Democrat 3

== Election result ==
Bury local election result 1998
Party	Seats	Gains	Losses	Net gain/loss	Seats %	Votes %	Votes	+/−
Labour	12	0	2	-2	75.0	52.1	19,449	
Conservative	3	2	0	+2	18.8	33.9	12,663	
Liberal Democrats	1	0	0	0	6.3	13.1	4,889	
Environment and Wildlife	0	0	0	0	0	0.7	260	
Independent	0	0	0	0	0	0.2	62	

== Ward results ==
Besses
Party	Candidate	Votes	%	±%
Labour	Catherine Platt	945	70.6	
Conservative	Ellen Singer	257	19.2	
Liberal Democrats	Ivy Hooley	137	10.2	
Majority		688	51.4	
Turnout		1,339	20.5	
Labour hold		Swing		

Church
Party	Candidate	Votes	%	±%
Conservative	Jack Walton	1,460	46.8	
Labour	John Smith	1,407	45.1	
Liberal Democrats	James Eagle	252	8.1	
Majority		53	1.7	
Turnout		3,119	35.3	
Conservative gain from Labour		Swing		

East
Party	Candidate	Votes	%	±%
Labour	Michael Connolly	1,332	79.1	
Conservative	Roger Thompson	353	20.9	
Majority		979	58.2	
Turnout		1,685	22.0	
Labour hold		Swing		

Elton
Party	Candidate	Votes	%	±%
Labour	John Costello	1,316	50.9	
Conservative	Norman Hamer	986	38.1	
Liberal Democrats	Robert Sloss	286	11.1	
Majority		330	12.8	
Turnout		2,588	27.7	
Labour hold		Swing		

Holyrood
Party	Candidate	Votes	%	±%
Liberal Democrats	Wilfred Clegg	1,352	56.5	
Labour	Brendan Hope	724	30.3	
Conservative	Kevin Laughton	316	13.2	
Majority		628	26.2	
Turnout		2,392	29.0	
Liberal Democrats hold		Swing		

Moorside
Party	Candidate	Votes	%	±%
Labour	Dorothy Cassidy	1,190	50.3	
Conservative	Robert Bibby	999	42.2	
Liberal Democrats	Winifred Rohmann	176	7.4	
Majority		191	8.1	
Turnout		2,365	29.3	
Labour hold		Swing		

Pilkington Park
Party	Candidate	Votes	%	±%
Labour	Warren Flood	1,036	53.7	
Conservative	Cecilia Aaron	748	38.8	
Liberal Democrats	Nigel Bird	146	7.6	
Majority		288	14.9	
Turnout		1,930	24.5	
Labour hold		Swing		

Radcliffe Central
Party	Candidate	Votes	%	±%
Labour	Kevin Scarlett	1,514	69.0	
Conservative	Cherrill Dunkley	359	16.4	
Liberal Democrats	Michael Halsall	260	11.8	
Independent	Mark Campion	62	2.8	
Majority		1,155	52.6	
Turnout		2,195	25.4	
Labour hold		Swing		

Radcliffe North
Party	Candidate	Votes	%	±%
Labour	Linda Harwood	1,421	49.7	
Conservative	Denise Bigg	1,009	35.3	
Environment and Wildlife	David Bentley	260	9.1	
Liberal Democrats	James Hooley	170	5.9	
Majority		412	14.4	
Turnout		2,859	27.3	
Labour hold		Swing		

Radcliffe South
Party	Candidate	Votes	%	±%
Labour	Stephen Perkins	1,044	55.2	
Conservative	Peter Wright	691	36.5	
Liberal Democrats	Theodor Tymczyna	158	8.3	
Majority		353	18.7	
Turnout		1,893	23.9	
Labour hold		Swing		

Ramsbottom
Party	Candidate	Votes	%	±%
Conservative	Dorothy Gunther	1,540	48.7	
Labour	Martina Longworth	1,274	40.3	
Liberal Democrats	Janet Turner	351	11.1	
Majority		266	8.4	
Turnout		3,165	28.8	
Conservative gain from Labour		Swing		

Redvales
Party	Candidate	Votes	%	±%
Labour	Farook Chaudhry	1,381	66.6	
Conservative	Christopher Hall	456	22.0	
Liberal Democrats	Martin Robinson Dowland	236	11.4	
Majority		925	44.6	
Turnout		2,073	26.0	
Labour hold		Swing		

St Mary's
Party	Candidate	Votes	%	±%
Labour	Julie Higson	1,274	57.1	
Conservative	Neville Singer	644	28.9	
Liberal Democrats	Mary D'Albert	312	14.0	
Majority		630	28.2	
Turnout		2,230	24.8	
Labour hold		Swing		

Sedgley
Party	Candidate	Votes	%	±%
Labour	Frances Adam	1,217	52.8	
Liberal Democrats	Timothy Pickstone	550	23.9	
Conservative	Bernard Vincent	538	23.3	
Majority		667	28.9	
Turnout		2,305	27.7	
Labour hold		Swing		

Tottington
Party	Candidate	Votes	%	±%
Conservative	David Higgin	1,614	53.7	
Labour	Elizabeth Melia	1,060	35.3	
Liberal Democrats	David Foss	331	11.0	
Majority		554	18.4	
Turnout		3,005	30.4	
Conservative hold		Swing		

Unsworth
Party	Candidate	Votes	%	±%
Labour	Gordon Shgarkey	1,314	60.3	
Conservative	Samuel Cohen	693	31.8	
Liberal Democrats	Geoffrey Young	172	7.9	
Majority		621	28.5	
Turnout		2,179	27.2	
Labour hold		Swing		
