= 1998 Cherwell District Council election =

1998 UK local government election

The 1998 Cherwell District Council election took place on 7 May 1998 to elect members of Cherwell District Council in Oxfordshire, England. One third of the council was up for election and the council stayed under no overall control.

17 seats were contested in the election with the three main political parties standing in most of the seats along with 2 independent candidates. The results saw the Labour party lose 2 seats but remain the largest party on the council, while the Conservatives gained 2 seats.

After the election, the composition of the council was

- Labour 24
- Conservative 17
- Liberal Democrat 7
- Independent 4

== Election result ==
Cherwell local election result 1998
Party	Seats	Gains	Losses	Net gain/loss	Seats %	Votes %	Votes	+/−
Conservative	9			+2	52.9			
Labour	5			-2	29.4			
Liberal Democrats	2			0	11.8			
Independent	1			0	5.9			
