= 1998 Tameside Metropolitan Borough Council election =

1998 UK local government election

Elections to Tameside Council were held on 7 May 1998. One third of the council was up for election and the Labour Party kept overall control of the council.

After the election, the composition of the council was:

- Labour 49
- Independent 4
- Conservative 2
- Liberal Democrat 2

== Election result ==
Tameside local election result 1998
Party	Seats	Gains	Losses	Net gain/loss	Seats %	Votes %	Votes	+/−
Labour	16			-2	84.2			
Conservative	2			+2	10.5			
Liberal Democrats	1			+1	5.3			
Independent	0			-1	0			
