= 1998 Oldham Metropolitan Borough Council election =

1998 UK local government election

The 1998 Oldham Council election took place on 7 May 1998 to elect members of Oldham Metropolitan Borough Council in Greater Manchester, England. One third of the council was up for election and the Labour Party stayed in overall control of the council.

After the election, the composition of the council was:

- Labour 36
- Liberal Democrat 23
- Independent 1

== Campaign ==
Before the election Labour ran the council with 35 councillors as compared to 24 for the Liberal Democrats. The election was mainly fought between these 2 parties with the Liberal Democrats campaigning on local issues under a slogan of "open, local, clean and green". They said that Labour were arrogant and complacent, while Labour attacked the Liberal Democrats for being irresponsible on public spending and opportunistic.

== Election result ==
Overall turnout in the election was 31%.

Oldham local election result 1998
Party	Seats	Gains	Losses	Net gain/loss	Seats %	Votes %	Votes	+/−
Labour	12			+1	60.0			
Liberal Democrats	8			-1	40.0			
