= 1998 Welwyn Hatfield District Council election =

1998 UK local government election

The 1998 Welwyn Hatfield District Council election took place on 7 May 1998 to elect members of Welwyn Hatfield District Council in Hertfordshire, England. One third of the council was up for election and the Labour party stayed in overall control of the council.

After the election, the composition of the council was

- Labour 27
- Conservative 20

== Election result ==
Welwyn Hatfield local election result 1998
Party	Seats	Gains	Losses	Net gain/loss	Seats %	Votes %	Votes	+/−
Conservative	10			+3	52.6			
Labour	9			-3	47.4			
