= 1998 Harrogate Borough Council election =

1998 UK local government election

The 1998 Harrogate Council election took place on 7 May 1998 to elect members of Harrogate Borough Council in North Yorkshire, England. One third of the council was up for election and the Liberal Democrats stayed in overall control of the council.

After the election, the composition of the council was:

- Liberal Democrat 40
- Conservative 14
- Labour 4
- Independent 1

== Election result ==
Harrogate local election result 1998
Party	Seats	Gains	Losses	Net gain/loss	Seats %	Votes %	Votes	+/−
Liberal Democrats	13			-3	65.0	48.8	12,590	
Conservative	6			+3	30.0	37.2	9,612	
Labour	1			0	5.0	11.5	2,979	
Independent	0			0	0	2.4	627	

== Ward results ==
Bilton
Party	Candidate	Votes	%	±%
Liberal Democrats	David Richold	927	64.2	
Labour	Peter Caunt	319	22.1	
Conservative	Simon Hogben	198	13.7	
Majority		608	42.1	
Turnout		1,444	25.3	

Bishop Monkton
Party	Candidate	Votes	%	±%
Conservative	Richard Thomas	427	51.4	
Liberal Democrats	David Parnaby	353	42.5	
Labour	Patricia Foxall	51	6.1	
Majority		74	8.9	
Turnout		831	42.0	

Duchy
Party	Candidate	Votes	%	±%
Liberal Democrats	Geoffrey Webber	929	61.1	
Conservative	Eric Cooper	478	31.4	
Labour	Anthony Blakesley	113	7.4	
Majority		451	29.7	
Turnout		1,520	23.0	

East Central
Party	Candidate	Votes	%	±%
Liberal Democrats	Stephen Macare	707	59.6	
Conservative	Alan Findlay	292	24.6	
Labour	Simon Hutchings	188	15.8	
Majority		415	35.0	
Turnout		1,187	23.7	

Granby
Party	Candidate	Votes	%	±%
Liberal Democrats	Margaret-Ann De Courcey-Bayley	717	66.2	
Conservative	Andrew Sommer	196	18.1	
Labour	David King	170	15.7	
Majority		521	48.1	
Turnout		1,083	19.6	

Harlow
Party	Candidate	Votes	%	±%
Liberal Democrats	Jack Duckworth	1,259	51.8	
Conservative	James Clark	1,078	44.4	
Labour	Glynn Robinson	93	3.8	
Majority		181	7.4	
Turnout		2,430	40.0	

Kirkby Malzeard
Party	Candidate	Votes	%	±%
Liberal Democrats	Charles Coverdale	559	67.0	
Conservative	Christine Adamson	233	27.9	
Labour	Jacqueline Heptinstall	42	5.0	
Majority		326	39.1	
Turnout		834	44.1	

Knaresborough East
Party	Candidate	Votes	%	±%
Liberal Democrats	Ann Hetherington	817	48.7	
Conservative	Charles Shaw	532	31.7	
Labour	Ann Crouch	328	19.6	
Majority		285	17.0	
Turnout		1,677	28.3	

Knaresborough West
Party	Candidate	Votes	%	±%
Labour	Andrew Wright	784	38.6	
Liberal Democrats	Bill Hoult	695	34.3	
Conservative	Lilian Mina	550	27.1	
Majority		89	4.4	
Turnout		2,029	36.2	

Marston Moor
Party	Candidate	Votes	%	±%
Conservative	John Dickinson	386	51.0	
Liberal Democrats	Gillean Firth	280	37.0	
Labour	Patrick O'Connor	91	12.0	
Majority		106	14.0	
Turnout		757	35.0	

New Park
Party	Candidate	Votes	%	±%
Liberal Democrats	Michael Johnston	468	72.2	
Conservative	Jean Butterfield	106	16.4	
Labour	Bryan Robinson	74	11.4	
Majority		362	55.9	
Turnout		648	21.6	

Newby
Party	Candidate	Votes	%	±%
Conservative	Simon Mercer	351	70.6	
Labour	David Sapherson	146	29.4	
Majority		205	41.2	
Turnout		497	23.0	

Pannal
Party	Candidate	Votes	%	±%
Conservative	Frederick Willis	1,518	56.7	
Liberal Democrats	Eric Waight	1,086	40.6	
Labour	Cynthia Coltman	72	2.7	
Majority		432	16.1	
Turnout		2,676	52.5	

Ripon East
Party	Candidate	Votes	%	±%
Liberal Democrats	Phillip Barlow	512	56.6	
Conservative	Malcolm Campbell	392	43.4	
Majority		120	13.3	
Turnout		904	15.4	

Ripon West
Party	Candidate	Votes	%	±%
Liberal Democrats	Alan Skidmore	825	63.3	
Conservative	John Topping	479	36.7	
Majority		346	26.5	
Turnout		1,304	22.8	

Spofforth
Party	Candidate	Votes	%	±%
Conservative	Shirley Fawcett	502	75.0	
Liberal Democrats	Andrew Goss	111	16.6	
Labour	Alan Beatham	56	8.4	
Majority		391	58.4	
Turnout		669	36.2	

Starbeck
Party	Candidate	Votes	%	±%
Liberal Democrats	Patricia Marsh	771	46.5	
Independent	Joan Waud	627	37.8	
Conservative	Phillip Dixon	133	8.0	
Labour	Geoffrey Foxall	126	7.6	
Majority		144	8.7	
Turnout		1,657	31.0	

Wathvale
Party	Candidate	Votes	%	±%
Conservative	Christopher Brown	490	78.3	
Labour	Alan Woodhead	75	12.0	
Liberal Democrats	Alistair Mason	61	9.7	
Majority		415	66.3	
Turnout		626	37.0	

Wedderburn
Party	Candidate	Votes	%	±%
Liberal Democrats	Ivan Lester	887	50.4	
Conservative	Nigel Middlemass	720	40.9	
Labour	Robert Swithinbank	153	8.7	
Majority		167	9.5	
Turnout		1,760	29.4	

West Central
Party	Candidate	Votes	%	±%
Liberal Democrats	Anthony Baker	626	49.1	
Conservative	John Frobisher	551	43.2	
Labour	Christine Colman	98	7.7	
Majority		75	5.9	
Turnout		1,275	22.3	
