= 1998 Penwith District Council election =

1998 UK local government election

Elections to Penwith District Council were held on 7 May 1998. One third of the council was up for election and the council stayed under no overall control. Overall turnout was 31.0%.

After the election, the composition of the council was:

- Liberal Democrat 12
- Conservative 7
- Independent 7
- Labour 6
- Others 2

== Results ==
Penwith local election result 1998
Party	Seats	Gains	Losses	Net gain/loss	Seats %	Votes %	Votes	+/−
Liberal Democrats	5			+2	45.5			
Conservative	2			+2	18.2			
Independent	2			0	18.2			
Labour	1			-2	9.1			
Others	1			-2	9.1			
