= 1998 Calderdale Metropolitan Borough Council election =

1998 UK local government election

Elections to Calderdale Metropolitan Borough Council were held on 7 May 1998. One third of the council was up for election and the Labour party kept overall control of the council.

After the election, the composition of the council was

- Labour 28
- Conservative 13
- Liberal Democrats 12
- Independent 1

== Election result ==
Calderdale local election result 1998
| Party | Seats | Gains | Losses | Net gain/loss | Seats % | Votes % | Votes | +/− |
|---|---|---|---|---|---|---|---|---|
| Conservative | 9 | | | +5 | 45.0 | | | |
| Liberal Democrats | 6 | | | +2 | 30.0 | | | |
| Labour | 5 | | | -6 | 25.0 | | | |
| Independent | 0 | | | -1 | 0 | | | |
