= 1998 Oxford City Council election =

1998 UK local government election

Elections to Oxford City Council were held on 7 May 1998. One third of the council seats were up for election. The Labour party kept its overall majority on the council. The number of Councillors for each party after the election were Labour 33, Liberal Democrat 14 and Green 4.

== Election result ==
Oxford local election result 1998
| Party | Seats | Gains | Losses | Net gain/loss | Seats % | Votes % | Votes | +/− |
|---|---|---|---|---|---|---|---|---|
| Labour | 9 | | | -4 | 52.9 | | | |
| Liberal Democrats | 6 | | | +3 | 35.3 | | | |
| Green | 2 | | | +1 | 11.8 | | | |

== See also ==
- Elections in the United Kingdom
