= 1998 Hyndburn Borough Council election =

1998 UK local government election

Elections to Hyndburn Borough Council were held on 7 May 1998. One third of the council was up for election and the Labour party stayed in overall control of the council.

After the election, the composition of the council was

- Labour 35
- Conservative 12

== Election result ==
Hyndburn local election result 1998
Party	Seats	Gains	Losses	Net gain/loss	Seats %	Votes %	Votes	+/−
Conservative	10			+9	58.8	46.7	8,199	
Labour	7			-9	41.2	46.4	8,139	
Liberal Democrats	0			0	0	6.9	1,213	

== Ward results ==
Barnfield
Party	Candidate	Votes	%	±%
Labour	T Horne	365	45.4	
Conservative	J Scholes	274	34.1	
Liberal Democrats	T Whitchelo	165	20.5	
Majority		91	11.3	
Turnout		804	28.1	
Labour hold		Swing		

Baxenden
Party	Candidate	Votes	%	±%
Conservative	D Scholes	728	55.5	
Labour	J Sargison	341	26.0	
Liberal Democrats	L Jones	242	18.5	
Majority		387	29.5	
Turnout		1,311	33.3	
Conservative hold		Swing		

Central
Party	Candidate	Votes	%	±%
Labour	K Curtis	455	48.3	
Conservative	S Crooks	369	39.2	
Liberal Democrats	R Moss	118	12.5	
Majority		86	9.1	
Turnout		942	30.0	
Labour hold		Swing		

Church
Party	Candidate	Votes	%	±%
Labour	L Dickinson	596	51.6	
Conservative	M Raynor	559	48.4	
Majority		37	3.2	
Turnout		1,155	27.7	
Labour hold		Swing		

Clayton-Le-Moors
Party	Candidate	Votes	%	±%
Conservative	J Storey	693	52.0	
Labour	M Cowell	640	48.0	
Majority		53	4.0	
Turnout		1,333	28.0	
Conservative gain from Labour		Swing		

Huncoat
Party	Candidate	Votes	%	±%
Labour	D Parkins	650	61.2	
Conservative	D Deakin	412	38.8	
Majority		238	22.4	
Turnout		1,062	32.8	
Labour hold		Swing		

Immanuel
Party	Candidate	Votes	%	±%
Conservative	S Hayes	727	58.5	
Labour	S Delaney	515	41.5	
Majority		212	17.0	
Turnout		1,242	32.8	
Conservative gain from Labour		Swing		

Milnshaw
Party	Candidate	Votes	%	±%
Conservative	P Travis	560	40.5	
Labour	J Battle	524	37.9	
Liberal Democrats	M Pritchard	300	21.7	
Majority		36	2.6	
Turnout		1,384	34.4	
Conservative gain from Labour		Swing		

Netherton
Party	Candidate	Votes	%	±%
Conservative	W Frankland	580	54.0	
Labour	E Russell	494	46.0	
Majority		86	8.0	
Turnout		1,074	30.2	
Conservative gain from Labour		Swing		

Norden (2)
Party	Candidate	Votes	%	±%
Conservative	R Davies	338		
Conservative	S Horne	328		
Labour	F Molloy	320		
Labour	S Walsh	262		
Turnout		1,248	26.4	
Conservative gain from Labour		Swing		
Conservative gain from Labour		Swing		

Overton
Party	Candidate	Votes	%	±%
Conservative	P Clarke	604	47.3	
Labour	A Williams	509	39.8	
Liberal Democrats	M Gradwell	165	12.9	
Majority		95	7.5	
Turnout		1,278	27.9	
Conservative gain from Labour		Swing		

Peel
Party	Candidate	Votes	%	±%
Labour	I Mason	443	57.3	
Conservative	D Wolstenholme	330	42.7	
Majority		113	14.6	
Turnout		773	22.7	
Labour hold		Swing		

Spring Hill (2)
Party	Candidate	Votes	%	±%
Labour	P Barton	502		
Labour	E Dunston	435		
Conservative	K Boota	261		
Liberal Democrats	P Witchelo	223		
Turnout		1,421	23.8	
Labour hold		Swing		

St Andrew's
Party	Candidate	Votes	%	±%
Conservative	B Walmsley	748	61.6	
Labour	P Rapson	466	38.4	
Majority		282	23.2	
Turnout		1,214	36.9	
Conservative gain from Labour		Swing		

St Oswald's
Party	Candidate	Votes	%	±%
Conservative	D Hayes	688	52.5	
Labour	W Goldsmith	622	47.5	
Majority		66	5.0	
Turnout		1,310	27.9	
Conservative gain from Labour		Swing		
