= 1998 Reigate and Banstead Borough Council election =

1998 UK local government election

Elections to Reigate and Banstead Council in Surrey, England were held on 7 May 1998. One third of the council was up for election and the council stayed under no overall control.

After the election, the composition of the council was

- Conservative 19
- Labour 13
- Liberal Democrat 11
- Residents 5
- Independent 1

== Election result ==
Reigate and Banstead local election result 1998
Party	Seats	Gains	Losses	Net gain/loss	Seats %	Votes %	Votes	+/−
Conservative	7			+3	41.2	43.9		
Labour	5			-1	29.4	23.2		
Liberal Democrats	3			-2	17.6	23.3		
Residents	2			+1	11.8			
Independent	0			-1	0			
