= 1998 Walsall Metropolitan Borough Council election =

1998 UK local government election

The 1998 Walsall Metropolitan Borough Council election took place on 7 May 1998 to elect members of Walsall Metropolitan Borough Council in the West Midlands, England. One third of the council was up for election and the council stayed under no overall control.

After the election, the composition of the council was

- Labour 30
- Conservative 16
- Liberal Democrat 6
- Independent 1
- Others 7

== Background ==
Before the election 11 Labour councillors had split from the party, forming their own group and being led by a former leader of the council Dave Church.

== Election result ==
Walsall local election result 1998
Party	Seats	Gains	Losses	Net gain/loss	Seats %	Votes %	Votes	+/−
Labour	11			+4	55.0			
Conservative	7			+3	35.0			
Liberal Democrats	2			+1	10.0			
Others	0			-8	0			
