= 1998 Rotherham Metropolitan Borough Council election =

1998 UK local government election

Elections to Rotherham Metropolitan Borough Council were held on 7 May 1998. One third of the council was up for election and the Labour party kept overall control of the council.

After the election, the composition of the council was

- Labour 65
- Conservative 1

== Election result ==
Rotherham local election result 1998
Party	Seats	Gains	Losses	Net gain/loss	Seats %	Votes %	Votes	+/−
Labour	22			0	95.7			
Conservative	1			0	4.3			
