= 1998 Hartlepool Borough Council election =

1998 UK local government election

Elections to Hartlepool Borough Council in the ceremonial county of County Durham in England were held on 7 May 1998. One third of the council was up for election and the Labour Party stayed in overall control of the council.

After the election, the composition of the council was:

- Labour 33
- Liberal Democrat 8
- Conservative 5
- Independent 1

== Election result ==
Hartlepool local election result 1998
| Party | Seats | Gains | Losses | Net gain/loss | Seats % | Votes % | Votes | +/− |
|---|---|---|---|---|---|---|---|---|
| Labour | 8 | | | -7 | 50.0 | 45.2 | | |
| Liberal Democrats | 4 | | | +4 | 25.0 | 28.9 | | |
| Conservative | 4 | | | +3 | 25.0 | 21.3 | | |
