= Cabinet of Benin =

Advisors to president of Benin

The Cabinet of Benin is appointed by the President of the Republic and is subject to the opinion of the Bureau of the National Assembly.

== Current formation ==
The current government of Benin, in place since May 25, 2021, is made up of 24 ministers:

1. Minister of State in charge of Planning and Development: Abdoulaye Bio Tchané
2. Minister of Justice and Legislation: Sévérin Quenum
3. Minister of Foreign Affairs and Cooperation: Shegun Adjadi Bakari
4. Minister of Economy and Finance: Romuald Wadagni
5. Minister of the Interior and Public Security: Sacca Lafia
6. Minister of the Living Environment and Sustainable Development: José Didier Tonato
7. Minister of Agriculture, Livestock and Fisheries: Gaston Dossouhoui
8. Minister of Decentralization and Local Governance: Alassane Seidou
9. Minister of Labour and Public Service: Adidjatou Mathys
10. Minister of Social Affairs and Micro-Finance: Véronique Tognifodé Mewanou
11. Minister of Health: Benjamin Hounkpatin
12. Minister of Higher Education and Scientific Research: Éléonore Yayi Ladekan
13. Minister of Secondary, Technical and Vocational Education: Mahougnon Kakpo
14. Minister of Nursery and Primary Education: Karimou Salimane
15. Minister of Tourism, Culture and the Arts: Babalola Jean-Michel Hervé Abimbola
16. Minister of Digital and Digitization: Aurélie Adam Soule
17. Minister of Infrastructure and Transport: Hervé Yves Hehomey
18. Minister of Industry and Trade: Shadiya Alimatou Assouman
19. Minister of Energy: Dona Jean-Claude Houssou
20. Minister of Water and Mines: Samou Seïdou Adambi
21. Minister of Small and Medium Enterprises and Employment Promotion: Modeste Kerekou
22. Minister of Sports: Oswald Homeky
23. Minister of Communication and Post: Alain Sourou Orounla
24. Minister of National Defence: Fortunet Alain Nouatin
