= Thérèse Waounwa =

Beninese politician

- Education: University of Abomey-Calavi
- Occupation: politician
- Known for: founders of the Communist Party of Benin
- Political party: Communist Party of Benin

Thérèse Waounwa was a politician from Benin. As one of the founder's and activist of the Communist Party of Benin (PCB), in 1977, she was responsible for the organization for the defense of human rights and peoples.

== Biography ==
=== Early life and education ===
Thérèse Waounwa earned a Baccalaureate G2 that she obtained at Coulibaly high school, then she enrolled in the Faculty of Legal Sciences of the National University of Benin.

She was involved in the reduction of university fees and, together with Séraphin Agbahoungbata and Sodji Thomas, launched student demonstrations against the People's Revolutionary Party of Benin, which led to her being pursued by the gendarmerie and the police in her third year of study. She was imprisoned and abused, and as a result of this, she stopped her law studies and went underground to study marketing and marketing. She obtained her "brevet de technicienne supérieure" (higher technical diploma).

=== Career ===
Thérèse Waounwa was one of the founders of the Communist Party of Benin (PcB) in 1977. She advocated against the regime of the People's Revolutionary Party of Benin in the 1980s. From 1985 to 1989, she was noted for her combativeness against autocracy until the convening of the National Sovereign Conference in February 1990. A founding member of the Communist Party of Benin, she continued to campaign for good governance and the improvement of people's living conditions. She was present during protest marches, sit-ins and other political events. Thérèse Waounwa was also a trader in Missèbo and president of the coordination of the action committees of the markets of Benin. She is also the coordinator of the Benin Workers' Forum.

== See also ==
- List of first women by occupation in Benin
- Women in Benin
- Geneviève Boko Nadjo
- Marie-Élise Gbèdo
