= Abortion in Benin =

In Benin, abortion is legal on broad socioeconomic grounds up to twelve weeks of pregnancy.

During the French colonial era, a 1920 law banned abortion except to save the life of the woman. In 2003, the National Assembly legalised abortion in the cases of threat to the mother's health, pregnancy from rape or incest, or risk of birth defects.

Benin is one of the only countries in Africa to legalise abortion. Many public health officials support legal abortion and cite the country's maternal mortality rate. Many religious leaders oppose it. Civil society organisations such as Ipas advocate for safe abortion.

The rates of abortion and self-induced abortion have increased since the 1990s. Unsafe abortion is common, especially among adolescents. Unsafe abortions are a major cause of maternal mortality in the country.

== Legislation ==
A 2021 amendment to the Sexual Health and Reproduction (SRH) 2003 Law permits abortion:

À la demande de la femme enceinte, l'interruption volontaire de grossesse peut être autorisée lorsque la grossesse est susceptible d'aggraver ou d'occasionner une situation de détresse matérielle, éducationnelle, professionnelle ou morale incompatible avec l'intérêt de la femme et/ou de l'enfant à naître...
Induced abortion may be authorised upon the request of the pregnant woman, voluntary termination of pregnancy can be allowed when the pregnancy is likely to aggravate or cause a situation of material, educational, professional or moral distress incompatible with the interest of the woman and/or the unborn child...

The law specifies a gestational age of 12 weeks (12 weeks after amenorrhea) during which abortion is permitted.

The law does not set a gestational limit for therapeutic abortion. Abortions prescribed by a doctor for the life or health of the woman have been legal since 2003.

The law states that a pregnant woman above the age of majority may request an abortion directly from a physician in a public or private health facility, or may make a request through a social worker. If the pregnant woman is a minor or an adult under a conservatorship, her legal representative must request an abortion through a social worker, who refers her to a facility which may provide an abortion with the legal guardian's consent.

== History ==
=== Colonial era ===
The 1920 law banning abortion in France has influenced the law and practice of abortion in Benin and other Francophone countries in West Africa.

=== Post-independence ===
Before 2003, abortion was only permitted to save the life of the pregnant woman. A select list of experts were allowed to examine a pregnancy to determine whether the only option for saving the woman's life was to induce abortion.

In 2003, Benin ratified the Maputo Protocol, which provides for access to safe abortion.

=== 2003 law ===
On 3 March 2003, law number 2003-04 was passed. Article 17 prohibited abortion with three exceptions:

Lorsque la poursuite de la grossesse met en danger la vie et la santé de la femme enceinte ; À la demande de la femme lorsque la grossesse est la conséquence d’un viol ou d’une relation incestueuse ; et lorsque l’enfant à naître présente une malformation congénitale.
In the case that the continuation of a pregnancy endangers the life or health of the pregnant woman; at the request of the pregnant woman if the pregnancy is the result of rape or incest; or in the case that the child would be born with a congenital malformation

The law stipulated a future decree to set the conditions and protocol for legal abortion.

=== 2021 law ===
According to 2021 government statistics, nearly 200 women died as a result of unsafe abortions. On the night of 20–21 October 2021, the National Assembly passed Law 2021-12, a legal amendment to Law 2003-04 on sexual and reproductive health. The new law allowed for abortion on request for up to twelve weeks of pregnancy for socioeconomic reasons. The legislators present during the final vote passed the law unanimously. Benin became one of the only countries in Africa to legalise abortion within a regulatory framework.

Some members of parliament opposed the law, as they believed abortion is immoral. President of the National Assembly Louis Vlavonou argued that the law was caused by Western influence and a conspiracy against African values. He argued that women must accept the consequences and responsibility of getting pregnant in lieu of seeking abortions.

The law was created due to lobbying by doctors, supported by the country's minister for social affairs Véronique Tognifode, and health minister Benjamin Hounkpatin, who have both worked as gynecologists. Hounkpatin cited the high rate of maternal deaths caused by unsafe abortions. President Patrice Talon supported the law.

==== Public debate ====
The Catholic Church in Benin, particularly the Episcopal Conference of Benin, has opposed Law 2021-12 and campaigned against its instatement.

Some doctors supported the new law as a way to reduce maternal mortality. Others opposed the law due to personal or religious opposition.

Civil society organizations welcomed the new law, including l’Association béninoise pour la promotion de la famille (ABPF, transl. Beninese Association for Family Promotion), the Collège National des Gynécologues et Obstétriciens du Bénin (CNGOB, transl. Benin National Association of Obstetricians and Gynecologists), and the non-governmental organization Femmes engagées pour le développement (transl. Women Engaged for Development).

On 12 October 2021, CNGOB spokesperson Raphaël Totongnon and the president of ABPF addressed the National Assembly and the president of the Law Commission, Orden Alladatin. Totongnon cited that abortion was the third-leading cause of maternal mortality in Benin. The ABPF president said, "In our advocacy speech, we demand that the National Assembly save the lives of the many women who lose their lives from clandestine abortions."

=== Civil society organisations ===
Organisations that advocate for access to safe abortion as part of sexual and reproductive health, include ABPF, the Parliamentary Network for Population and Development, Ipas Francophone Africa, CNGOB, the International Planned Parenthood Federation, Rutgers, and UNFPA Benin.

From September 2020 to December 2021, Ipas Francophone Africa collaborated with Rutgers to implement the "Sa santé, ses choix" (transl. Her health, her choice) project to improve the condition of abortion in Benin. Through this project, Ipas worked to change mentalities, wrote a document advocating for safe abortion, trained providers at ABPF's partner clinics, published an evaluation of abortion in Benin, organised a national dialogue on abortion, and drafted a plan for the Ministry of Health.

== Prevalence ==
In 2015–2019, there were 589,000 pregnancies per year, of which 227,000 were unintended and 84,300 resulted in abortion. Between 1990–1994 and 2015–2019, the unintended pregnancy rate decreased by 17% and the abortion rate increased by 22%.

Abortion is a taboo subject in Benin. There is a strong stigma surrounding abortion based on religious and moral values. The stigma leads women to seek clandestine abortions.

Since the 1990s, self-induced abortions have been growing in Benin, especially among students in high school or university.

Complications of unsafe abortion among women, especially adolescents, are a major public health issue. Health authorities consider the rate of unsafe abortions alarming.

Unsafe abortions contribute to the country's maternal mortality rate of 391 per 100,000 births, as of 2021. Before the 2021 law was passed, it was estimated that 200 women per year died of unsafe abortions, of which 20% were adolescents. A 2002 study conducted in four hospitals reported that 14.6% of deaths were caused by unsafe abortions. Among girls aged 15 to 19, 15% of maternal deaths are caused by unsafe abortions, as of 2021.

Contraceptive use is rare. As of 2013, only 8% of women in relationships use birth control. This rate is highest in Cotonou, at 12%.

=== Cases ===
In March 2022, a 41-year-old auxiliary nurse was sentenced to 20 years of prison for providing a clandestine abortion that caused the death of a young woman in December 2016.

== See also ==
- Health in Benin
- Human rights in Benin
- Women in Benin
