= Amani Abou-Zeid =

Egyptian development aid expert

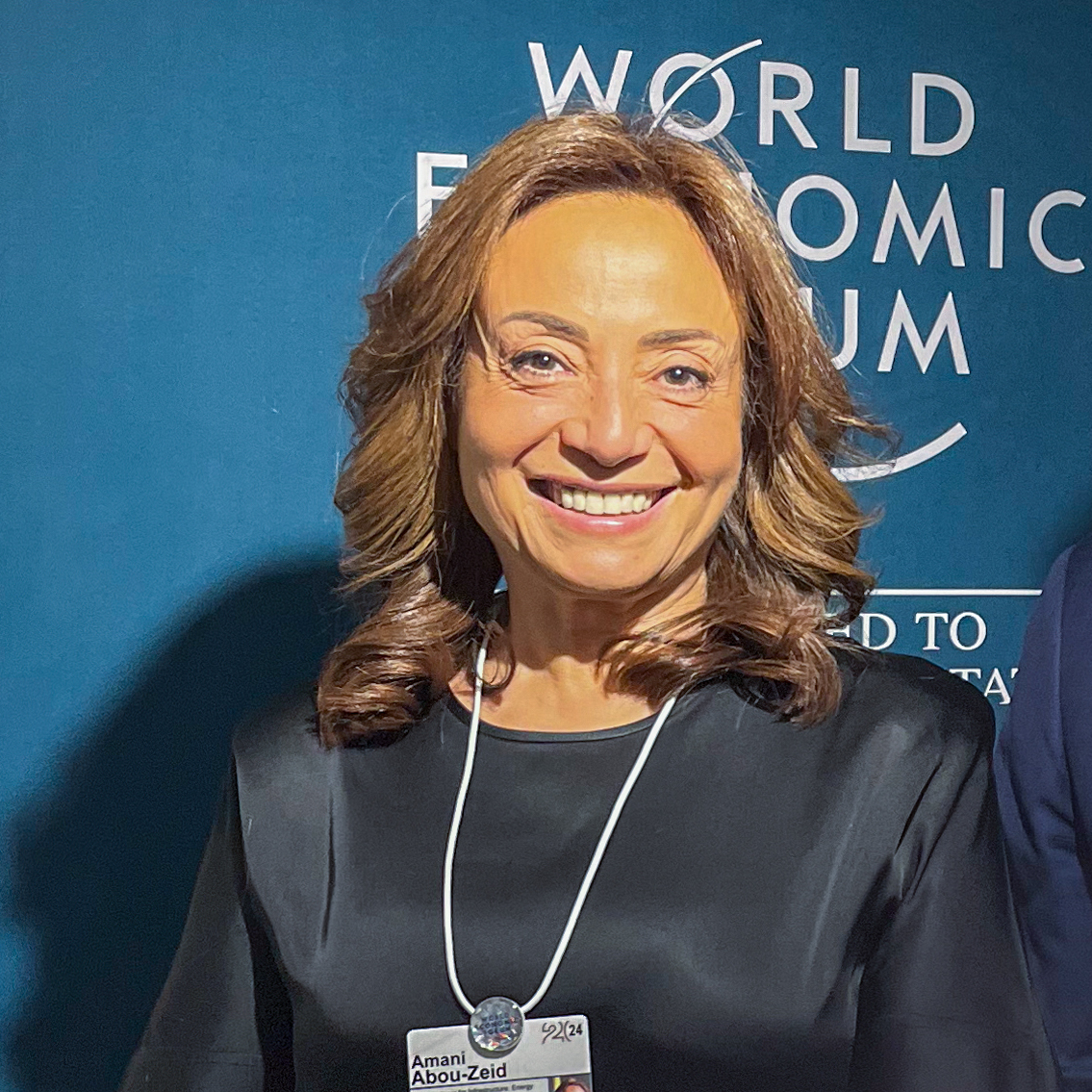
- in 2024
- Education: University of Cairo the Sorbonne; Kennedy School of Harvard University; University of Manchester
- Employer: Broadband Commission

Amani Abou-Zeid ( Arabic أماني أبو زيد, DMG Amānī Abū Zaid) is an Egyptian development aid expert. She became the Commissioner for Infrastructure and Energy, African Union, Addis Ababa - African Union Commission in 2017. She worked for international organizations such as the African Development Bank (AFDB), the United Nations Development Program (UNDP) and the United States Agency for International Development (USAID).

Abou-Zeid is a trustee at 5Rights Foundation, an organisation founded by Baroness Beeban Kidron to promote the rights of children online.

== Life ==
Abou-Zeid studied electrical engineering at the University of Cairo, earned a Baccalauréat en arts at the Sorbonne, completed master 's degrees in project management at the University of Senghor in Alexandria and in public administration at the Kennedy School of Harvard University. She gained a PhD in 1981 and she then received an honorary doctorate in Social and Economic Development from the University of Manchester in 2001.

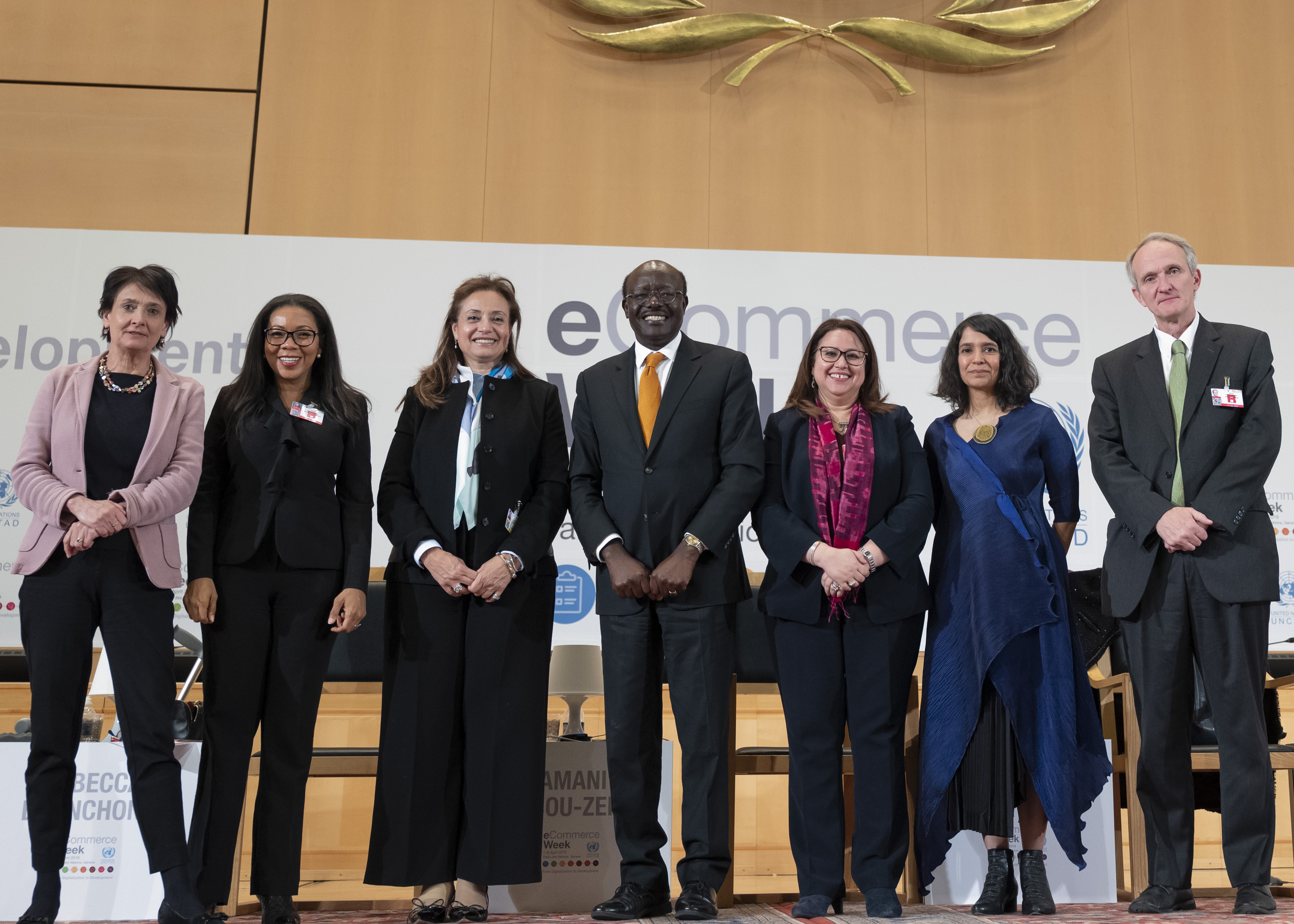
Group photo ECommerce Week 2019: left to right, Imogen Foulkens Moderator, Rebecca Enonchong, Amani Abou-Zeid, Mukhisa Kituyi, Boutheina Guermazi, Malavika Jayaram and David Porteous

She worked for 30 years at international organizations in the areas of infrastructure and energy, including the United Nations Development Program (UNDP) and the United States Agency for International Development (USAID). She has worked in many African countries as well as France, the UK and Canada. Until 2017, she held senior positions at the African Development Bank, most recently as director of the Africa Natural Resource Center. This institution supports African governments in the effective and inclusive use of natural resources. For example, Abou-Zeid mediated between the African Development Bank and Morocco in the realization of the world's largest solar energy complex (Noor) in 2018. Otherwise, she contributed significantly to the bank granting low-interest loans to low-income African countries. Amani Abou-Zeid was elected one of the eight commissioners of the African Union in 2017 and took over the areas of infrastructure and energy. In 2019 she was recognised as one of the top 100 African women by Avance Media. She was the only Egyptian and she and Aya Chebbi were the only ones from North Africa.

In 2021, she was confirmed as a commissioners of the African Union in Addis Ababa for another four years, where she also took on responsibility for tourism, information and communications technology. 25 candidates from 18 different African countries competed in these elections. With 50 votes, Abou-Zeid received more votes than any previous candidate. At the African Union, she oversees programs such as the Single African Air Transport Market and the Broadband Commission for Africa.

In 2023 Emmerson Mngangagwa President of Zimbabwe welcomed the SmartAfrica Summit to Zimbabwe. Five heads of state were present including Paul Kagame of Rwanda who chairs SmartAfrica's main board. Commissioners and leaders from the Broadband commission included Abou-Zeid, Kagame, Doreen Bogdan-Martin of ITU, Co-Vice Chair of the Broadband Commission, Lacina Koné, Director-General of Smart Africa, Paula Ingabire, Rwanda's Minister of Information Communication Technology and Innovation, Aurélie Adam-Soule Zoumarou, Benin's Minister of Digital Economy and Communication and Ursula Owusu-Ekuful, Minister of Communications and Digitalization of Ghana.
