= Yêyinou Laura Estelle Loko =

Beninese entomologist

- Other names: Laura Estelle Yêyinou Loko; Yêyinou Laura Estelle Loko épouse Kone
- Education: University of Abomey-Calavi; University of Yaoundé I; University of Versailles Saint-Quentin-en-Yvelines
- Known for: Environmentally friendly biological control methods against insect pests; research on plant genetic resources and pest management in Benin
- Awards: OWSD–Elsevier Foundation Award (2023); TWAS–Abdool Karim Award in Biological Sciences (2024); L’Oréal–UNESCO regional postdoctoral fellowship (2014)
- Scientific career
- Fields: Entomology; crop protection; plant genetic resources
- Workplaces: National University of Sciences, Technologies, Engineering and Mathematics (UNSTIM); National High School of Applied Biosciences and Biotechnologies (ENSBBA)

Yêyinou Laura Estelle Loko is a Beninese entomologist and crop protection researcher. She is an associate professor of zoology and genetics at the National University of Sciences, Technologies, Engineering and Mathematics (UNSTIM) and serves as director of the National High School of Applied Biosciences and Biotechnologies (ENSBBA).

Loko’s research focuses on environmentally friendly pest management and the conservation and use of plant genetic resources in Benin, including approaches that reduce reliance on synthetic insecticides. She received the 2024 The World Academy of Sciences (TWAS)–Abdool Karim Award in Biological Sciences for contributions to biological control methods against insect pests and work on plant genetic resources in Benin.

== Early life and education ==
Loko studied animal biology at the University of Yaoundé I (Cameroon) and later completed graduate study in applied entomology at the University of Abomey-Calavi (Benin). She earned a PhD in plant genetic resources and crop protection at the University of Abomey-Calavi in 2013, and also completed a master’s degree at the University of Versailles Saint-Quentin-en-Yvelines (France).

== Academic and administrative career ==
Loko has been affiliated with UNSTIM as a lecturer-researcher since 2013. From 2021, she is the director of ENSBBA, then within the “Université des Nouvelles Technologies et des Sciences”. Loko was also selected as an African Academy of Sciences Affiliate for the 2020–2024 period, a programme intended to support early- and mid-career African scientists.

== Research ==
Loko’s research addresses insect pests affecting crops and stored products in West Africa, with an emphasis on integrated pest management approaches intended to protect human health and the environment.

She has conducted field surveys with farmers in Benin as part of her work on pest challenges and control practices. Her published research includes studies on pest management of dried yam chips and storage pests, including botanical and biological control approaches, and work documenting farmers’ knowledge of pests and local practices in Benin.

== Awards and recognition ==
In February 2023, Loko was named among the seven recipients of the 2023 Organization for Women in Science for the Developing World (OWSD)–Elsevier Foundation Award for Early-Career Women Scientists in the Developing World, aligned with UN SDG 2 (“Zero Hunger”).

TWAS announced Loko as the recipient of the 2024 TWAS–Abdool Karim Award in Biological Sciences, citing her contributions to environmentally friendly biological control methods against insect pests and work on knowledge and conservation of plant genetic resources in Benin. Loko is also a laureate of the L’Oréal–UNESCO regional postdoctoral fellowship for women in science (Sub-Saharan Africa, 2014) and a laureate candidate in the One Planet Fellowship (2020).

== Selected works ==
- Loko, L. E. Y.; et al. (2017). "Resistance of dried chips of yam (Dioscorea cayenensis–D. rotundata complex) landraces to Dinoderus porcellus (Coleoptera: Bostrichidae)". Cogent Food & Agriculture. doi:10.1080/23311932.2017.1411180.
- Loko, L. Y.; et al. (2017). "Repellent Effect and Insecticidal Activities of Bridelia ferruginea, Blighia sapida, and Khaya senegalensis against Dinoderus porcellus in infested dried yam chips". Psyche: A Journal of Entomology. doi:10.1155/2017/5468202. hdl:10568/83363.
- Loko, Y. L. E.; et al. (2022). "Potential of Metarhizium anisopliae and Beauveria bassiana to control Dinoderus porcellus (Coleoptera: Bostrychidae) infesting yam chips". Journal of Asia-Pacific Entomology. 25 (2) 101885. Bibcode:2022JAsPE..2501885L. doi:10.1016/j.aspen.2022.101885.
- Loko, Y. L. E.; et al. (2025). "Effect of botanical powders and the assassin bug, Alloeocranum biannulipes, against Dinoderus porcellus infesting yam chips". Open Research Africa. 7: 7. doi:10.12688/openresafrica.15173.2. PMC 11775442. PMID 39882076.
- Loko, L. E. Yêyinou; et al. (2017). "Farmers' perception of termites in agriculture production and their indigenous utilization in Northwest Benin". Journal of Ethnobiology and Ethnomedicine. 13 (1) 64. doi:10.1186/s13002-017-0187-2. PMC 5697355. PMID 29157286.

== See also ==
- Integrated pest management
- Biological pest control
- Women in science
