= Romain Glèlè Kakaï =

Beninese academic

Romain Lucas Glèlè Kakaï
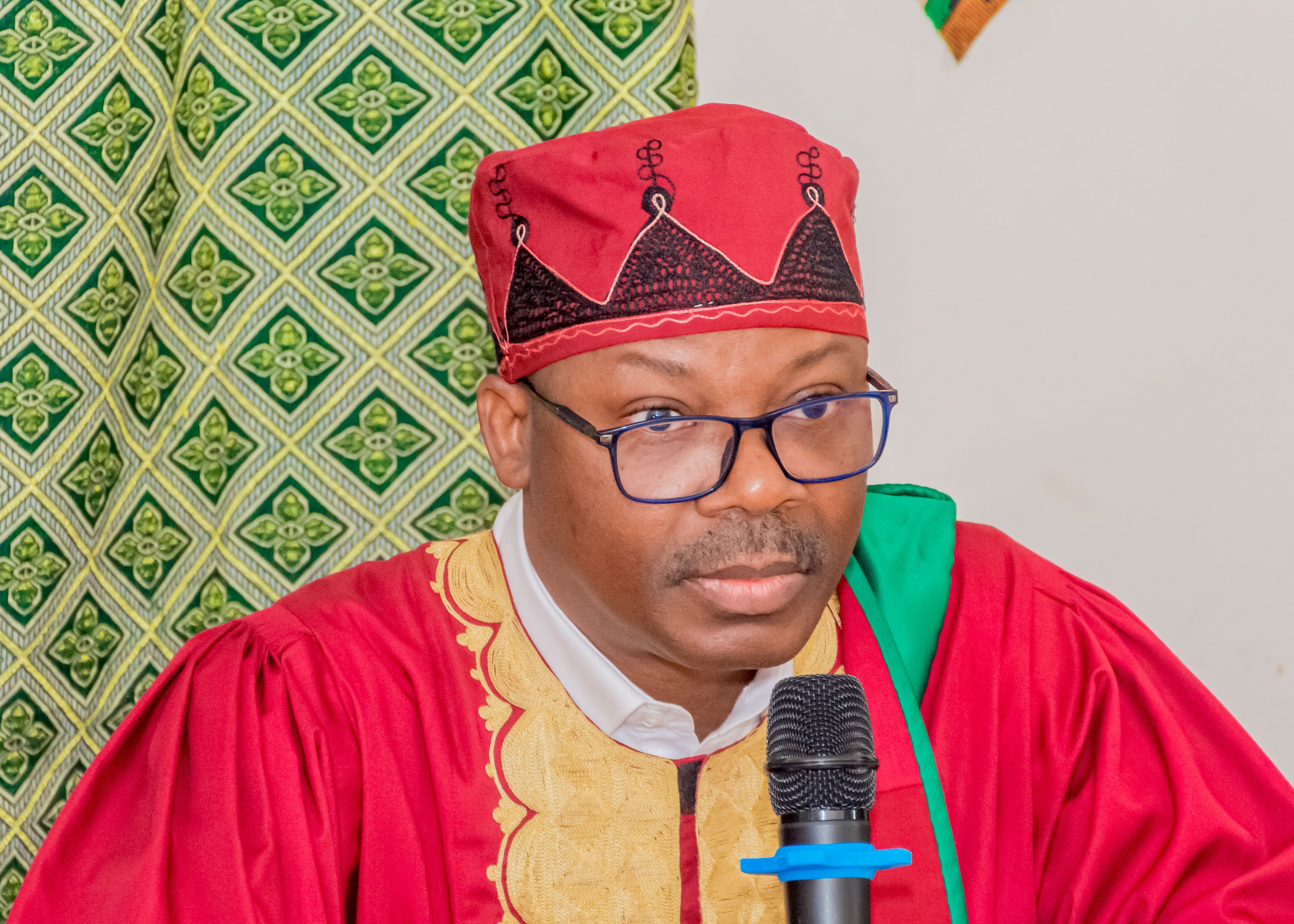
- Born: February 28, 1973 (age 53); Cotonou, Benin
- Education: Gembloux Agro-Bio Tech (B.E., M.Sc., Ph.D.)
- Occupations: Professor of Biostatistics and Forest Estimations
- Employer: University of Abomey-Calavi
- Known for: Forest modeling, Biomathematics, Applied statistics
- Title: Full Professor, Head of Laboratory of Biomathematics and Forest Estimations

Romain Glèlè Kakaï, whose full name is Romain Lucas Glèlè Kakaï Agbidinoukoun, born on February 28, 1973, in Cotonou, is a Beninese academic specializing in biomathematics and forest estimations and a member of the African Academy of Sciences.

A lecturer at the Faculty of Agronomic Sciences of the University of Abomey-Calavi in Benin, he has distinguished himself through his research work and prolific scientific production and is ranked 2nd in the top 100 scientists of Benin according to the AD Scientific Index.

== Biography ==
=== Origins and studies ===
Romain Lucas Glèlè Kakaï graduated top of his class at every stage of his academic training. He obtained a degree in General Agronomy in 1998, then a degree in Forest Agronomic Engineering in 2000 at the University of Abomey-Calavi. He continued his studies in Belgium at Gembloux Agro-Bio Tech of the University of Liège (formerly known as the University Faculty of Agricultural Sciences of Gembloux), where he earned a postgraduate diploma in applied statistics and computer science and a PhD in biometrics in 2005.

== Career and research domains ==
A Full Professor of Biostatistics at the Faculty of Agronomic Sciences of the University of Abomey-Calavi, he heads the Laboratory of Biomathematics and Forest Estimations (LABEF) at this university, and coordinates master’s and doctoral programs in biostatistics, taught in English, which have attracted students from 23 African countries. He also chaired the Scientific Council of Agronomic Sciences of his university from 2016 to 2024, and was the first president of the Scientific Council of the National Institute of Agricultural Research of Benin (INRAB) from 2017 to 2019.

An expert in mathematical modeling of living systems, his research is diverse and includes biomathematics, data science, and forest estimation. He has developed and popularized in Africa the practical applications of advanced statistical and mathematical methods in the life sciences through teaching, research, and scientific publications.

His current research focuses on linear and nonlinear mixed-effects models, nonlinear dynamical systems, ecology, and the restoration of mangrove ecosystems.

== Laboratory ==
The Laboratory of Biomathematics and Forest Estimations (LABEF), which he leads, aims to analyze the applicability of mathematical tools in the life sciences and to understand the interactions between ecological processes, human health, anthropogenic factors, and the structure of terrestrial ecosystems, with a clear link to management and policy.

== Affiliations and recognitions ==
Romain Lucas Glèlè Kakaï is:

- Member of the African Academy of Sciences (since 2023)
- President of the African German Network of Excellence in Sciences: 2019–2023
- Member of the Global Young Academy (GYA) (2013–2018)
- Young Affiliate of the World Academy of Sciences (TWAS) 2011–2015
- "New Champions" of the World Economic Forum (2012)
- Fellow of the Alexander von Humboldt Foundation for Excellence in Science in 2007
- "Jan Tinbergen" Prize for best young statistician from emerging and developing countries, awarded by the International Statistical Institute in 2005
- "Heinz and Johannes" Prize for Best Research Paper in Ecology, 2007, awarded by The Support Africa International Foundation, Germany, 2007

== Contributions ==
Romain Lucas Glèlè Kakaï is an FAO expert in training and designing National Forest Inventory methodologies for West African countries. He is Director of the Humboldt Hub on socio-ecological modeling of COVID-19 in Africa.

In 2023, he developed an age-structured mathematical model and associated computer code capable of analyzing the impact of different vaccination scenarios on the malaria burden in African countries.

He is one of the group leaders on malaria modeling within the Vaccine Impact Modelling Consortium (VIMC), a task force that provides the GAVI and the World Health Organization with projections on the impact of vaccination on the burden of infectious diseases worldwide.

== Publications ==
Romain Lucas Glèlè Kakaï has to his credit more than 300 scientific publications including:

=== Books ===
- Salako K. Valère, Zanvo M.G. Serge, Sinsin B. Corine, Gnansounou S. Constant, Adomou C. Aristide. Glèlè Kakaï R. (2021). Atlas of Plant Species of the Mangroves of Benin : Diversity, Uses and Conservation. National Library, Benin
- Glèlè Kakaï R. (2010). Classification Rules and Error Rates in Discriminant Analysis. EEU, Germany.
- Glèlè Kakaï R., Sodjinou E., Fonton H. N. (2006). Conditions for the Application of Parametric Statistical Methods. National Library, Benin.
- Glèlè Kakaï R., Palm R., Kokode G. (2005). Decision Discriminant Analysis: Theoretical Aspects and Computer Applications. National Library, Benin
- Glèlè Kakaï R., Kokode G. (2004). Univariate and Multivariate Statistical Techniques: Computer Applications. National Library, Benin

=== Scientific articles (selection) ===
- 2025: Nonlinear Mixed Models and Related Approaches in Infectious Disease modeling: A Systematic and Critical Review
- 2025: A Stochastic Continuous-Time Markov Chain Approach for Modeling the Dynamics of Cholera Transmission: Exploring the Probability of Disease Persistence or Extinction
- 2025: Machine learning techniques for tomato yield prediction: A comprehensive Analysis
- 2024: Direct and Indirect Effects of Environmental and Socio-Economic Factors on COVID-19 in Africa Using Structural Equation Modeling
- 2024: Empirical Performance of Deep Learning Models with Class Imbalance for Crop Disease Classification
- 2024: Modelling the potential impact of climate change on Carapa procera DC. in Benin and Burkina Faso (West Africa)
- 2023: Economic Valuation of Mangroves and a Linear Mixed Model-Assisted Framework for Identifying Its Main Drivers: A Case Study in Benin
- 2023: Tree height-diameter, aboveground and belowground biomass allometries for two West African mangrove species
- 2023: Digital soil mapping: a predictive performance assessment of spatial linear regression, Bayesian and ML-based models
- 2023: Performance of inhomogeneous Poisson point process models under different scenarios of uncertainty in species presence-only data

== See also ==
- University of Abomey-Calavi
- Biostatistics
- Jean-Pierre Ezin
