= Assouman =

Assouman is a name. Notable people with the name include:

- René Assouman Joeffrey, Rwandan footballer
- Shadiya Alimatou Assouman, Beninese politician
