= Houssou =

Houssou is a surname. Notable people with the surname include:

- Dona Jean-Claude Houssou, Beninese politician
- Nanan Houssou (born 2000), Ivorian footballer
