= Smart Africa Alliance =

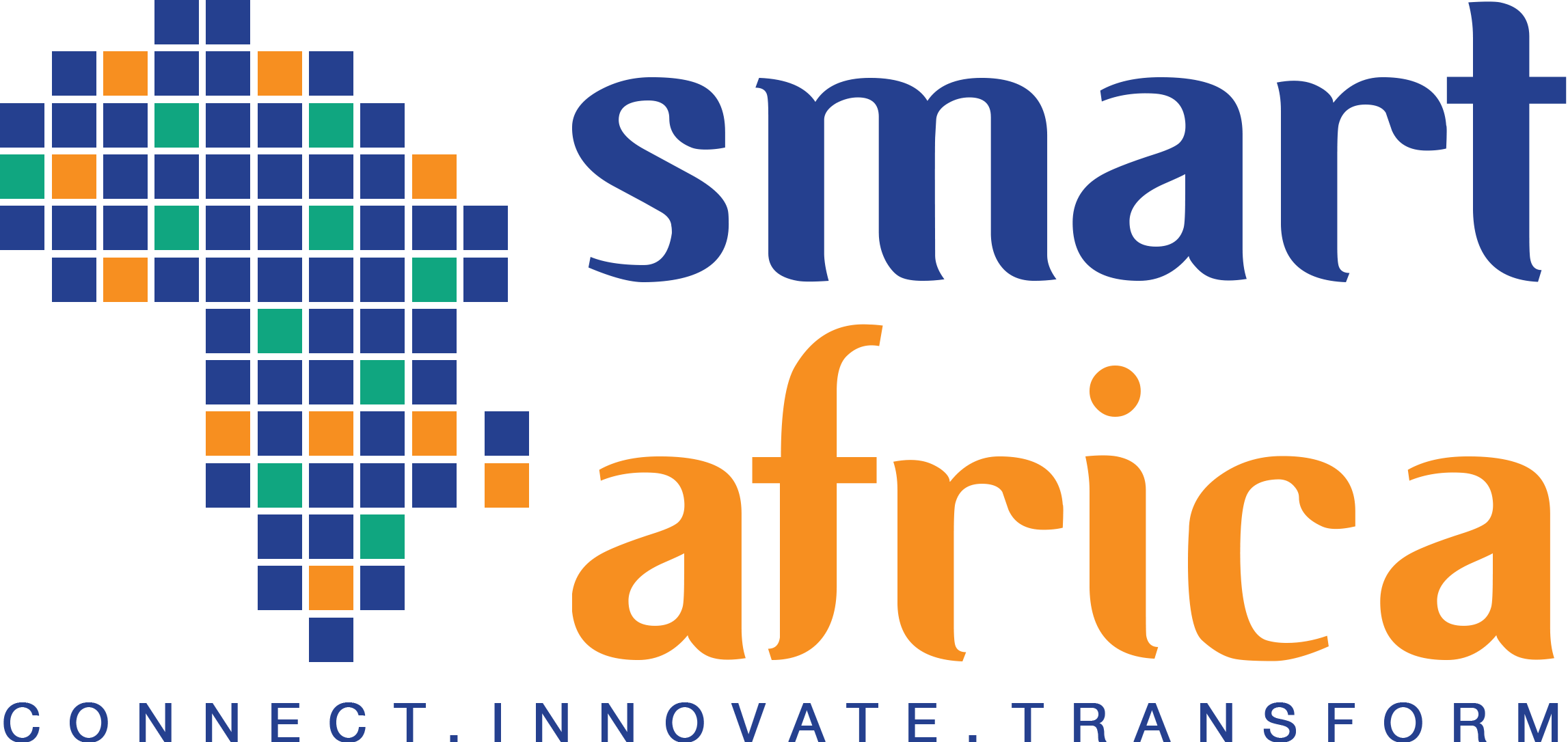

The Smart Africa Alliance is a partnership among African countries adhering to the Smart Africa Manifesto. Its goal is to accelerate sustainable socioeconomic development on the African continent through usage of Information and Communications Technologies (ICTs) and through better access to broadband services. Other Partners of the Smart Africa Alliance include the African Union, the ITU, World Bank, the African Development Bank, the United Nations Economic Commission for Africa, the GSMA, ICANN and companies. The Smart Africa Alliance board is chaired by President Paul Kagame and the secretariat is led by director general Lacina Koné since March 2019.

== Transform Africa Summit ==
Smart Africa hosts an annual ICT and Technology Policy conference called the Transform Africa Summit. This is Smart Africa's flagship project which is entering its 6th edition. The summit hosts international heads of state, ministers of ICT, business leaders and policy makers.

In 2023 the annual summit was held out Rwanda in Victoria Falls, Zimbabwe. It claimed the involvement of 37 nations including a recent addition of Eswatini. 4,000 delegates from nearly a hundred countries and the presence of five heads of state. Commissioners and leaders from the Broadband commission included Amani Abou-Zeid, Paul Kagame, Doreen Bogdan-Martin of ITU, Co-Vice Chair of the Broadband Commission, Lacina Koné, Director-General of Smart Africa, Paula Ingabire, Minister of Information Communication Technology and Innovation of Rwanda, Aurélie Adam-Soule Zoumarou, Minister of Digital Economy and Communication of the Republic of Benin, Ursula Owusu-Ekuful, Minister of Communications and Digitalization of Ghana and Bocar Ba, Chief Executive Officer of the Samena Telecommunications Council.
