= Ajman University =

Private university in United Arab Emirates

Coordinates: 25.41226°N 55.50666°E

- جامعة عجمان
- Established: 17 June 1988
- Chancellor: Dr. Karim Seghir
- Location: Ajman, United Arab Emirates
- Website: www.ajman.ac.ae

Ajman University (Arabic: جامعة عجمان) was established on 17 June 1988 as the first private university in the Gulf Cooperation Council. It was the first university in the United Arab Emirates to admit expatriate students under the institutional name "Ajman University College of Science and Technology," which was subsequently renamed "Ajman University of Science and Technology". In 2018, it was again renamed to "Ajman University".

Ajman University is located in the Al Jurf area, close to Khalifa Hospital in Ajman. It is a comprehensive, traditional university offering a wide range of academic disciplines, including a fully accredited College of Medicine and College of Law. The 215,000 m^{2} (2.31-million ft^{2}) campus has sports facilities (football, basketball, track and field, swimming), a gymnasium, a bookstore, health unit, restaurants, and mosques. Its standard academic year is divided into the fall (August) and spring (January) semesters; it also has one summer semester (June).

Ajman University was ranked among the top 30 universities (#17) in the Arab world, and is ranked #6 in the UAE according to the 2026 QS University rankings.

Ajman University was ranked (#397) among the top 400 universities in the world.

Ajman University is accredited by the Commission for Academic Accreditation (CAA), the UAE Federal Government's quality assurance agency for higher education.

== Transition to Non-Profit Institution ==
On 20 December 2023, H.H. Sheikh Humaid bin Rashid Al Nuaimi, Ruler of Ajman, issued Emiri Decree No. 14 of 2023, officially converting Ajman University from a for-profit entity into a non-profit institution.

Under the decree:

- The university gained legal personality and administrative/financial independence.
- It is now owned by the Government of Ajman, no longer subject to prior government HR and fiscal systems.

The decree specifies institutional objectives: enhancing academic and research excellence, promoting innovation and entrepreneurship, expanding access to education globally, and supporting economic development.

== Notable alumni ==
- Dr. Abdullah Khalfan Al Kindi – President of Emirates Pharmacy Society and Head of Department at the Ministry of Health and Prevention in the United Arab Emirates.
- Ali Al Amri – Chief Executive Officer of Commercial Bank International.
- Dr. Ayman Abufanas – Dental Surgeon and Founder and Chief Executive Officer of Clinica Medical Center.
- Dr. Laila Faridoon – Chief Executive Officer of New Economy Academy.
- Hisham Hammoud – Vice Chairman and Group Chief Executive Officer of SKH Family Office.
- Maha Jaafar – Social media personality and UNICEF National Ambassador to Sudan.
- Majid Al Jenaid – Chief Executive Officer of Sharjah Cooperative Society.
- Mustafa Al Khalafawi – Chief Executive Officer of Ajman Bank.
- Dr. Narimane Hadj Hamou – Founder and Chief Executive Officer of the Center for Learning Innovations and Customized Knowledge Solutions (CLICKS).
- Shoayb Khattab – Internationally recognized architectural photographer and Founder of MassHouse.
- Lacina Koné – Director-General and Chief Executive Officer of Smart Africa.
- Nadia Al Najjar – Children's author and recipient of the Emirates Award for Fiction and the Sharjah International Book Fair Creative Writing Award.
- Nura al-Badi – Poet, educator, columnist, and environmental radio playwright.
- Saqr Hasan – Founder and Chairman of SKH Family Office.

== See also ==
- List of Islamic educational institutions
