= Candide Azzanaï =

Candide Azannaï
- Azzanai (right) and Boni Yayi, 2019

Minister of Defense of Benin
- In office April 6, 2016 – March 27, 2017 (officially); October 2017 (de facto)
- Succeeded by: Fortunet Alain Nouatin

Minister of Industry, Trade, and Small and Medium Enterprises
- In office June 2010 – March 2011

Personal details
- Born: June 14, 1959 (age 67) Porto-Novo, Benin
- Party: RB (2003-05, 2015–2017); Restore Hope Party (2007-2010, 2017-present); FCBE (2010–2011)

Candide Azzanaï is a Beninois politician who served as a minister in Thomas Boni Yayi's first and second terms and Patrice Talon's first term. He was implicated in the 2025 Beninese coup attempt against Talon.

== Biography ==
Azzanaï was born on June 14, 1959, in Porto-Novo, Benin. Azzanaï first ran for parliament in 2003 in the Benin Rebirth Party (RB), where he was elected. In 2007, he ran in his own party, Restoring Hope.

=== Boni Yayi administration ===
Azzanaï was appointed Minister of Industry, Trade, Small and Medium Enterprises and as a government spokesman by Thomas Boni Yayi ahead of the latter's preparation for a second term, which he won in March 2011. In 2011, Azzanaï was elected as a deputy to the National Assembly under the Cowry Forces for an Emerging Benin (FCBE) party, which supported the government. After the cabinet reshuffle in 2011, Azzanaï left the government to return to his seat as a deputy. He was replaced as a minister by Sephou Madina and as a spokesman by Jean-Michel Abimbola.

In the 2015 elections, Azzanaï returned to running under the RB party. Tensions were high between him and Boni Yayi in May 2015. Azzanaï was arbitrarily arrested in an attempt to silence him by Boni Yayi, and subsequently he became one of Boni Yayi's opponent Patrice Talon's first and strongest supporters. Azzanaï called Boni Yayi's administration a "democratatorship".

=== Talon administration ===
Azzanaï was appointed the Beninois Minister of Defense in 2016 upon Talon's election. Over disputes about the country's constitution, Azzanaï resigned on March 27, 2017, although he refused to give up his ministry position for several weeks. He dropped hints to media organizations about the reasons for his resignation in the following months. By October 2017, he said he was in "pure and clear opposition" to the Talon administration. Despite resigning, he held the post of Minister of Defense de facto before Talon could find a replacement for him.

Azzanaï was arrested on December 12, 2025, five days after the 2025 Beninese coup attempt that failed to overthrow Talon. He was charged with "conspiracy against the authority of the state" and "direct incitement to rebellion." He was then placed in pre-trial detention on December 20.
