= Women in Benin =

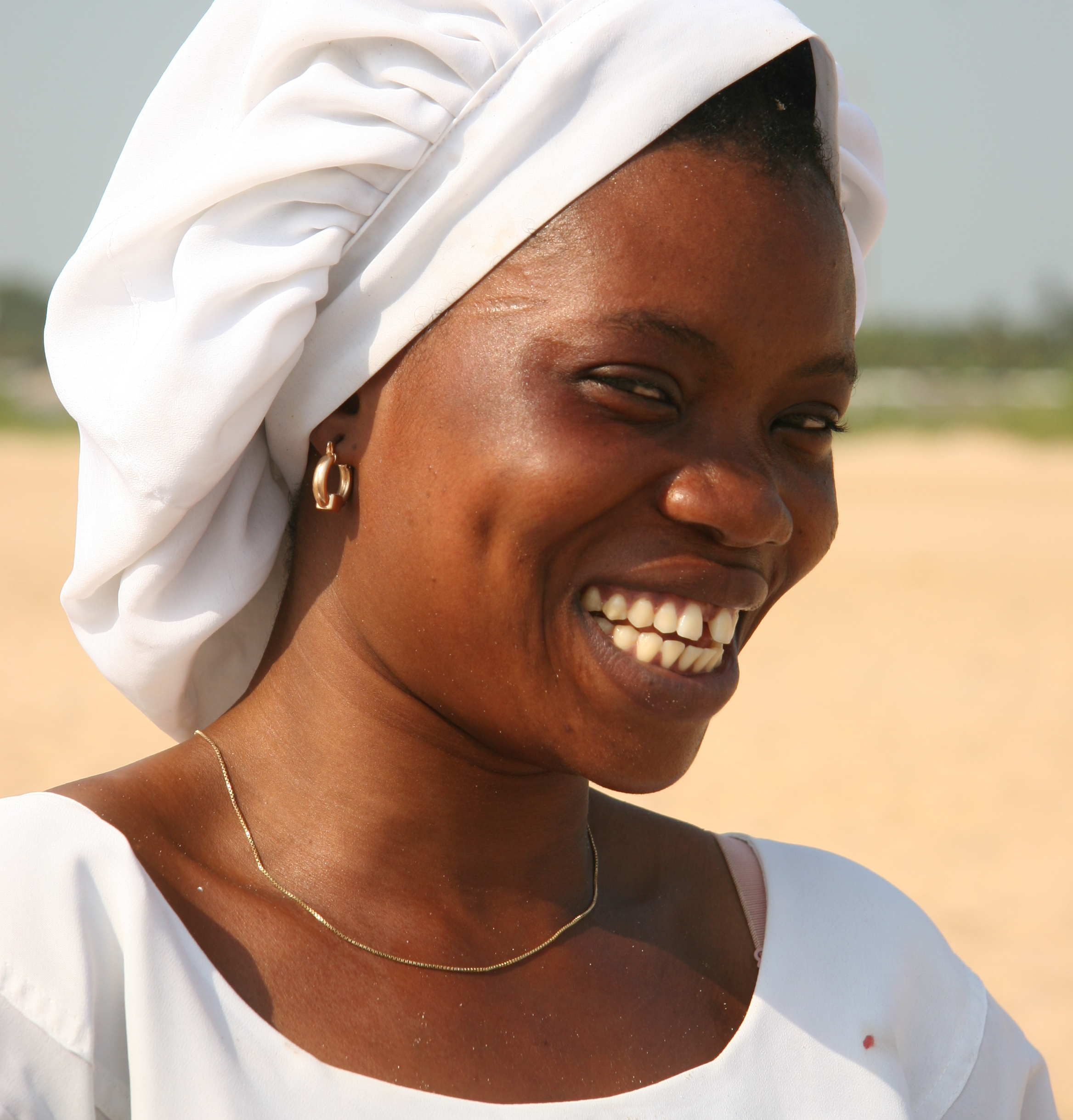
- A woman in Benin

General statistics
- Maternal mortality (per 100,000): 350 (2010)
- Women in parliament: 8.4% (2013)
- Women over 25 with secondary education: 11.2% (2012)
- Women in labour force: 67.5% (2012)

Gender Inequality Index
- Value: 0.602(2021)
- Rank: 152nd out of 191

Global Gender Gap Index
- Value: 0.676 (2025)
- Rank: 113th out of 148

Women in Benin have gained more rights since the restoration of democracy and the ratification of the Constitution, and the passage of the Personal and Family Code in 2004. These both overrode various traditional customs that systematically treated women unequally. Still, inequality and discrimination persist. "Girls from the age of five or so are actively involved in housekeeping, sibling care, and agriculture." Society could think about of a woman's role are a housemaid, caretaker, or babysitter. A woman's role is to be a housemaker and nothing at all, but women have much potential to be more than a housemaker. With laws taking charge of what a woman can be as a career of how they are being useful more in the house than in a men's job position. Moreover, these rules apply to women by their gender that has not changed for a while. And there has been inequality based on being the opposite gender which these rules should immediately change if the society wants to get better to have equality for the female race.

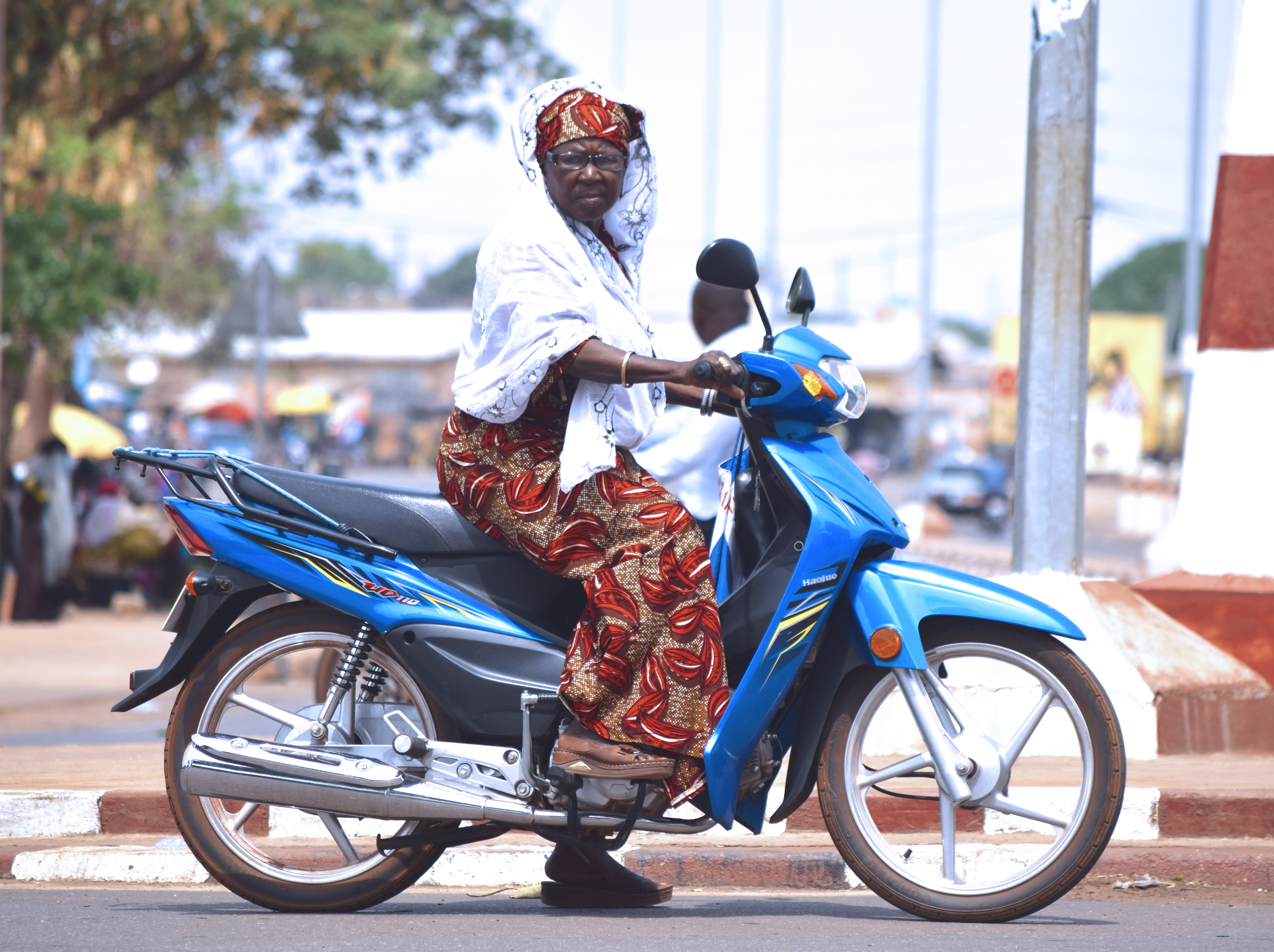
Woman on motorcycle

== Human rights issues ==
Female genital mutilation has been described as "the worst substantial human rights violation in Benin." About 13 percent of women and girls have been subjected to it (over 70 percent in some regions and tribes), but the law against it is rarely enforced. Prostitution, especially child prostitution, is also common, with the clients often being sex tourists. Sexual harassment is also common, with many female students being abused by their teachers." This is the sacrosanct rule of the strong sex over the weak sex." Society wants to keep the gender roles traditional as men are dominant in their relationship. Since the society wants to keep the social hierarchy of men being at the top of the hierarchy while the women are stuck at the bottom which they want it to keep it that way as long the hierarchy stays the same without changes. These discriminations against women are lowering their confidence to be nothing else than a weak gender of the hierarchy while the male are staying at a superior gender. Women and girls from Benin are struggling to find an opportunity to be an individual and not being a non existing human being. And, one of the disadvantages of being a woman in Benin is lack of individualism which being themselves is against their cultural traditions based on the gender roles they have set up as how women should appropriately behave around in their society.

Although it is a criminal offense punishable by up to two years in prison, enforcement is slack. Local customs which are unfavorable to women no longer have the force of law in Benin, where women enjoy equal rights under the constitution, including in matters related to marriage and inheritance. Still, they experience a great deal of social and employment discrimination owing to traditional attitudes about sex roles, and have a much harder time obtaining credit and when widowed do not have the right to manage their own property. Women in rural areas play subordinate roles and do a great deal of hard labor. These women has been through challenges of being neglected and insulted by their country based on the rules that are created by men. There are still men are continuing to keep having negative comments over women. "Men, in turn, know that they enjoy many advantages which they consider perfectly normal."

Women who have experienced discrimination or abuse which they are keeping their own thoughts in silent until someone can start a change to see how women can be something more than a weak gender but, an opportunity to create a change for them and for the next generation for women empowerment. Women can seek assistance from Women in Law and Development-Benin, the Female Jurists Association of Benin (AFJB), and the Women's Justice and Empowerment Initiative through Care International's Empower Project. A 2012 U.S. report commended Benin for establishing the National Council for the Promotion of Gender Equity and Equality.

== Discrimination and abuse ==
Women who have experienced discrimination or abuse keep their own thoughts silent until someone starts a change. They then see how women can be more than a weak gender but, an opportunity to create a change for them and for the next generation for women empowerment. Women can seek assistance from Women in Law and Development-Benin, the Female Jurists Association of Benin (AFJB), and the Women's Justice and Empowerment Initiative through Care International's Empower Project. A 2012 U.S. report commended Benin for establishing the National Council for the Promotion of Gender Equity and Equality.

== Education & intimate partner violence ==
Education can improve women's lives in many ways, including decreasing tolerance to abuse. Being educated can actually lower their chances of IPV (intimate partner violence) because it improves their decision making, even in choosing a spouse or partner. Women who experience intimate partner violence can have many affects from it. Statistics show that women who have experienced this are more likely to have an abortion. Vicentia Boco, who served as president of the Institut national pour la promotion de la femme between 2009 and 2021, called on the government to enhance education of women as a result.

== Health issues ==
Anaemia is a health issue that largely affects women across Benin. However, there are many aspects that go into anaemia. A study " found that incomplete immunization, stunted growth, recent infection, absence of a bednet, low household living standard, low maternal education and low community development index increased the risk of anaemia." Annick Nonohou has campaigned for improved obstetric care for women, describing "institutionalised violence" being used against mothers during childbirth.

== Women in the workplace ==
In Benin, many women work in the service industry. They tend to occupy lower positions that have less power. They tend to choose work that is less of a time commitment as many have to tend to the home and their children as well. Many of them make money through the open markets selling vegetables and other items. Many feel as though working helps them in different ways, even outside of the economic benefit. Some aspects of life that it helps are gaining respect, being able to raise a family comfortably, and achieving their own goals for themselves. However, on the other side of this, women do experience violence and sexual harassment in the workplace. There are many organizations that can assist in aiding these women.

== See also ==
- Abortion in Benin
- Women in Africa
