= Yézoumi Akogo =

Togolese agricultural scientist

- Born: Togo
- Education: National University of Benin
- Awards: L’Oréal-UNESCO Women in Science Fellowship; 2000
- Scientific career
- Fields: Agricultural science

Yézoumi Akogo is an agricultural scientist from Togo, who attended the National University of Benin. Her research examines the in vitro propagation of plants utilised in market gardening, tubers and medicinal plants. In 2000, she was awarded a L’Oréal-UNESCO Women in Science Fellowship, which enables recipients to fund field research. Akogo has worked on the in vitro propagation of okra, as well as models for experimental plant morphogenesis.
