= Maha Jaafar =

Sudanese-Iraqi activist and influencer

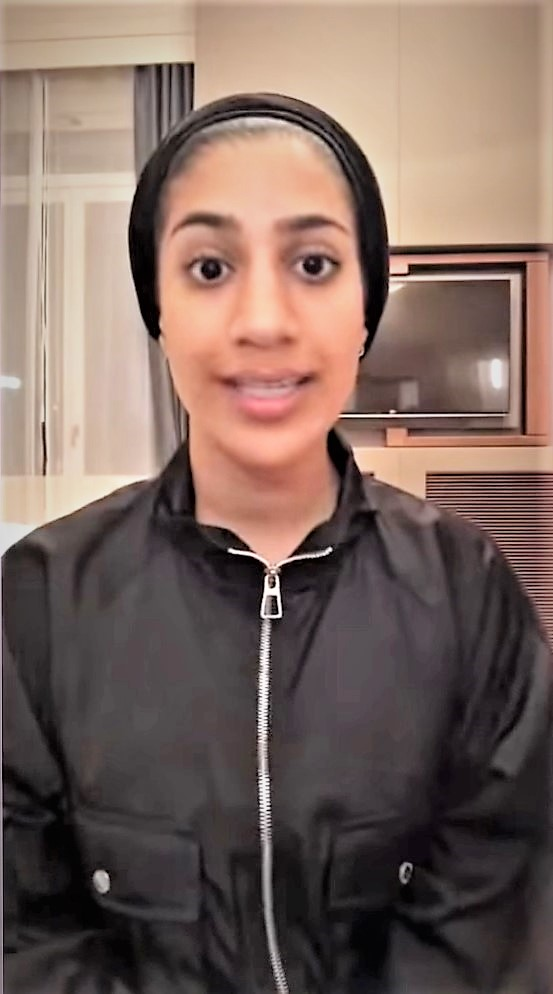
- Born: 1994 (age 31–32); Sudanese-Iraqi
- Occupation: YouTuber

Maha Jaafar (born 1994) is a Sudanese-Iraqi dentist and YouTuber, living in Dubai, United Arab Emirates. She is mainly known as a social media influencer and 'Ambassador' for YouTube’s Creators for Change. After her first successful video in 2016, she became widely known for her videos on cultural diversity in Sudan and about linguistic differences of people in various Arabic-speaking countries. Through her videos on social media, she tries to contribute to fighting hate speech, extremism and xenophobia. In 2020, she was appointed as National Ambassador for Children’s Rights by UNICEF Sudan.

== Early life ==
Maha Jaafar (born 1994) is a Sudanese–Iraqi dentist, social media influencer, comedian, and disability rights advocate. Based in Dubai, United Arab Emirates, she is best known for her comedic YouTube videos that celebrate cultural diversity, along with her roles as a UNICEF National Ambassador and a YouTube Creators for Change ambassador.

== Biography and career ==
An article in The National online newspaper in the United Arab Emirates reports that Jaafar grew up in Sharjah and Dubai. She graduated in dentistry from Ajman University and, still a student, started to produce videos on YouTube to "have fun with her friends". According to a video by the BBC's video series Trending, her first video on social media in 2016 was a comical sketch imitating different Arabic dialects and stereotypes that has achieved more than 1.7 million views.

Because of the success with her videos, Jaafar was invited in 2018 to the Creators of Change Summit in London, UK, where she interviewed the Pakistani activist for female education and youngest Nobel Prize laureate Malala Yousafzai. In 2018, she produced a video about the diversity of cultures in Sudan, called Salimmik - A Love Letter to Sudan that has had more than 3.9 million visits according to UNICEF Sudan.

In November 2020, Jaafar was appointed as National Ambassador for Children’s Rights by UNICEF Sudan. As such, she is expected to raise awareness about children's rights, which, as expressed by UNICEF Sudan, includes various "issues affecting children and youth, such as the right to education, the right to health and nutrition, the impact of poverty and discrimination, and the need for protection against violence, abuse and exploitation."

The [Creators for Change] programme is really about fighting hate speech, extremism and xenophobia. It’s to promote love, tolerance and understanding. I imitate accents and I do different characters but – at the same time as making people laugh – I do it to connect different cultures together to show the similarities that we have.

— Maha Jaafar, The National News - Arts & Culture

== Impact and Significance ==
Maha Jaafar is recognized for:

- Bridging cultural divides in the Arabic-speaking world through humor and dialects.
- Bringing Sudanese diasporic culture to a global audience.
- Holding influential roles that combine digital influence with social advocacy, particularly in support of children's rights and inclusivity.
