= Geneviève Boko Nadjo =

Beninese lawyer (born 1956)

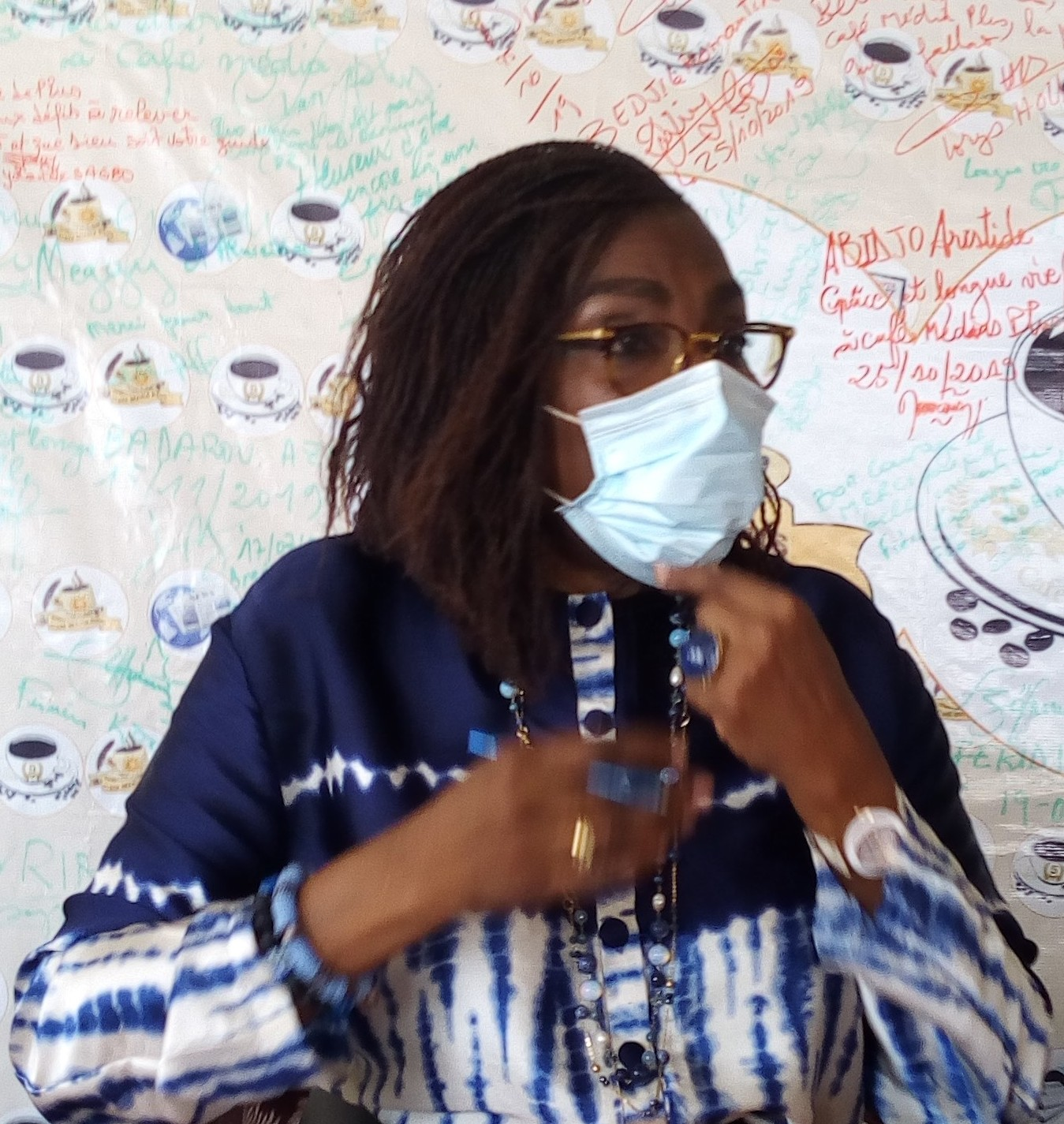
- at the press club in Benin in 2020
- Born: December 26, 1956 (age 69); Cotonou
- Education: University of Abomey-Calavi
- Occupation: Judge
- Known for: one of the five people that oversee Benin's elections

Geneviève Boko Nadjo (born December 26, 1956) is a Beninese lawyer. She has been a prosecutor in Cotonou and it one of the five members of Benin's Commission that oversees elections. The appointment raised comment as she is considered close to the President.

== Life ==
Nadjo was born in 1956 in Cotonou. She gained her baccalaureate qualification in 1977 and with that joined the National University of Benin. She graduated with a master's degree in law in 1981.

From 1983 to 1986 she worked for the Ministry of Planning and Statistics and the Civil and Criminal Affairs Department at the Ministry of Justice.

In 1988 she gained a qualification as a magistrate from the National School of Administration and Magistracy at her alma mater. From 1988 until 2006, she was deputy prosecutor in the area of Cotonou, and then president of a Cotonou court.

Nadjo became Executive Chair of the Women in Law & Development in Africa (Femmes, Droit et Développement en Afrique) in her part of Africa. On 8 May 2014 she was elected by a majority of the members of parliament as representative of magistrates at the Autonomous National Electoral Commission (CENA) of Benin. Those elected serve for just the period of an election, but a change was made and five permanent members were appointed. Her appointment was questioned as she was seen to be one of the two members who were regarded as close to the President. Two of the others were considered independent but the other member was Emmanuel Tiando who was an ex-minister giving the impression that CENA was biased.

She received the Aské Trophy awarded to the most influential women in Africa in 2018.

As part of the 2021 presidential election in Benin, as vice-president of CENA, she clarifies and justifies the confidentiality of sponsorship. She also declared to the press that the coinage of the signature of the sponsorship of presidential candidates is illegal. Benin democratic reputation has been reduced during the last few years. Patrice Talon has agreed to stand and recent changes in the law mean that Presidential candidates need the support of 16 members of parliament and nearly all the current MPs are members of parties that Talon agrees with. It has been predicted that Talon may be re-elected unopposed.
