= Jean-Pierre Ezin =

Beninese emeritus professor of mathematics

- Born: 1944 (age 81–82)
- Education: University of Dakar, University of Sciences and Technologies, Lille I, France
- Occupations: Researcher, Academician
- Employer(s): St Jean de Douai Institution, France. Saint Judes Institution of Armentières, France. National University of Benin
- Organization(s): African Academy of Sciences, The World Academy of Sciences, National Academy of Sciences, Arts and Letters of Benin (ANSALB)

Jean-Pierre Onvêhoun Ezin is a Beninese Emeritus Professor of mathematics at University of Abomey-Calavi (Université d'Abomey-Calavi). He was a former commissioner of Economic Community of West African States (ECOWAS) for Education, Science and Culture. He was a Commissioner of African Union for Human Resource, Science and Technology. He was the Founding Director of Institute of Mathematics and Physical Sciences, Benin (Institut de Mathématiques et de Sciences Physiques, Bénin ) and a former Rector National University, Benin (Recteur Université Nationale, Bénin). He is an elected fellow of the World Academy of Sciences and African Academy of Sciences

== Early life and education ==
Ezin was Born in 1944 in Guézin, Benin Republic. He attended Father Aupiais College (Collège Père Aupiais) for his secondary and High school education. He obtained his Bachelor and master's degree in Mathematics and Fundamental Applications at the Faculty of Sciences from the University of Dakar-Fann, Senegal. In 1970, He obtained a Diploma from the Institute of Business Administration (I.A.E) and Diploma of Advanced Studies in Mathematics, University of Sciences and Technologies, Lille I, France. In 1972 and 1981, he obtained the Doctor of 3rd cycle of mathematics and Doctor of State in Mathematics from the same Institution.

== Career ==
He was a short term teacher at St Jean de Douai Institution, France Saint Bernard and Saint Judes Institution of Armentières, France from 1971 - 1973. In 1973, he became an Assistant lecturer at National University of Benin. In 1977, he became a master assistant at University of Sciences and Technologies of Lille, he became a lecturer at National University of Benin and a full professor in 1999.

== Academic administrative appointments ==
In 1975, he was the Head of Department of Mathematics at the Faculty of Sciences. In 1976, he became the Director of Scientific and Technical Studies Department (National University of Benin). In 1992, he was appointed as the rector of National University of Benin and in 1988, he became the Founder and Director of Institute of Mathematics and Physical Sciences in Benin Republic.

== International appointments ==
In 2011, He was appointed as the chairperson of Orientation Council of the Inter Establishment Research Agency for Development (AIRD) [Conseil d’Orientation de l’Agence Inter établissement de Recherche pour le Développement (AIRD)]. From 2008 - 2013, He was the African Union's (AU) Commissioner in charge of Human Resources, Science and Technology from 2008 - 2013. In 2014, he became the Economic Community of West African States (ECOWAS) commissioner in charge of Education, Science and Culture.

== Memberships ==
In 2010, he became a member of the Board of Directors of Office of International Science and Engineering (OISE) USA. He is an elected member of African Academy of Sciences and The World Academy of Sciences. He is also part of the Founding members of National Academy of Sciences, Arts and Letters of Benin (ANSALB)
