= Kouaro Yves Chabi =

Beninese politician (1973–2025)

Minister of Secondary, Technical and Vocational Education of Benin
- In office 25 May 2021 – 20 February 2025
- President: Patrice Talon
- Preceded by: Mahougnon Kakpo

Personal details
- Born: 19 May 1973; Tanguiéta, Atakora, Dahomey
- Died: 20 February 2025 (aged 51); Parakou, Borgou, Benin
- Political party: Progressive Union Renewal

Kouaro Yves Chabi (19 May 1973 – 20 February 2025) was a Beninese politician.

== Early life and education ==
Chabi was born in Tanguiéta on 19 May 1973.

After acquiring a certificate in human resources management from the University of Quebec, he obtained a master's degree in Education Sciences from West Virginia University in 2007.

== Political career ==
Chabi was a member of the Progressive Union Renewal.

From 2017 to May 2021, he held the position of education monitoring officer at the Analysis and Investigation Office at the Presidency of Benin.

On 23 May 2021, he was appointed minister of secondary education in the government of president Patrice Talon for his second term. He was sworn in on 25 May.

== Death ==
Chabi died in a traffic collision on the outskirts of Parakou on 20 February 2025. He was 51.

== Honours ==
- Cross of the Order of Merit of Benin
