= Mahougnon Kakpo =

Beninese politician

Minister of Secondary, Technical and Vocational Education of Benin
- In office 30 October 2017 – 23 May 2021
- President: Patrice Talon
- Succeeded by: Kouaro Yves Chabi

Personal details
- Born: 1964 or 1965 (age 60–61) Benin
- Party: Independent

Mahougnon Kakpo is a Beninese politician and educator. He is a former Minister of Secondary, Technical and Vocational Education in Benin, having been appointed to the position in 2017 by president Patrice Talon. In 2019, he was elected to the National Assembly.

Political offices
Preceded by	Minister of Secondary, Technical and Vocational Education of Benin; 2017–2021	Succeeded by Kouaro Yves Chabi
