= Hervé Yves Hehomey =

Beninese politician

Minister of Infrastructure and Transport of Benin
- Incumbent
- Assumed office 25 May 2021
- President: Patrice Talon

Personal details
- Born: Benin
- Party: Independent

Hervé Yves Hehomey is a Beninese politician and educator. He is the current Minister of Infrastructure and Transport in Benin, having been appointed to the position in early 2021 by the current president of Benin, Patrice Talon. His term began on 25 May 2021.

Awards and achievements
Preceded by	Minister of Infrastructure and Transport of Benin	Succeeded by
