= Ipas (organization) =

International non-governmental organization

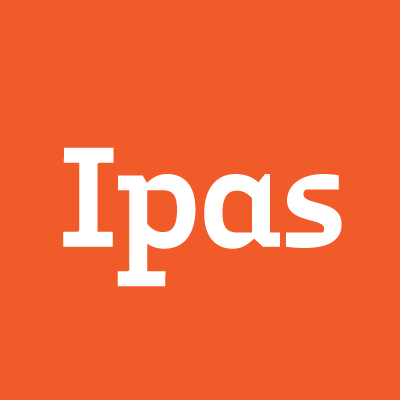
- Founded: 1973
- Type: Nonprofit 501(c)(3)
- Location: North Carolina
- Region served: Worldwide
- Website: www.ipas.org

Ipas is an international, non-governmental organization that seeks to increase access to safe abortions and contraception. To this end the organization informs women how to obtain safe and legal abortions and trains relevant partners in Africa, Asia, and Latin America on how to provide and advocate for these.

== History ==
Ipas's work began in 1973, with the provision of life-saving reproductive health technologies for health systems in several countries. Today Ipas works on five continents with a comprehensive approach that centers the needs of those who seek abortion care. Ipas aims to build sustainable abortion ecosystems that address all factors impacting a person's ability to access abortion—from individual health knowledge, to social and community support, to a trained health workforce, to political leadership and supportive laws. To that end, Ipas trains providers and work with health systems to ensure accessible, high-quality abortion services—including the right and ability to self-manage an abortion with pills. Ipas conducts research with the goal of turning policy into practice. They also partner with local organizations to educate communities on reproductive health and rights, to advocate for legal abortion, and to support local champions for reproductive justice.

== Scope of work ==
Ipas works to improve women's access and right to safe abortion care and reproductive health services by:

- Training doctors, nurses, and midwives in clinical and counseling skills for abortion, postabortion care and family planning;
- Improving health-service delivery to make abortion safer and more accessible for women and less costly for the health system;
- Researching the impact of unsafe abortion and documenting best abortion care practices and policies;
- Working with advocates and policymakers around the world to support women's reproductive rights and increase access to safe and legal abortion services;
- Engaging with women and men in their communities to expand their knowledge of reproductive health and reproductive rights;
- Increasing access to reproductive health technologies, including manual vacuum aspiration (MVA) and medical abortion.

To aid these tactics, together with other similar bodies, Ipas issued a joint declaration on abortion during the Nairobi Summit on ICPD25 in 2019, where the strategy of these organizations is to:

- Make abortion, including abortion self-care, safe, legal, available, accessible and affordable by eliminating all laws and policies that restrict or criminalize access;
- Ensure universal health coverage integrates comprehensive sexual and reproductive health information, abortion, post-abortion and contraception;
- Comprehensively educate about sex with informed choice and autonomy, contraception and abortion, and links to such services without permission of third-parties;
- Increase access to early, quality medical abortion through hotlines, telemedicine and self-care referral systems;
- Train and draw providers attention to sexual and reproductive health needs of marginalized groups to ensure equal access to contraception and abortion;
- Promote "gender equality" via changing "harmful social and gender norms and stereotypes around sexuality, pregnancy and abortion";
- Provide access to emergency contraception, safe abortion services and psycho-social support when needed, especially for all survivors of sexual and gender-based violence.

== Areas of focus ==
- Advancing gender equity
- Abortion in humanitarian settings
- Abortion self-care
- Comprehensive sexuality education
- Ending abortion stigma
- Care for victims of gender-based violence
- Reducing the harm of U.S. foreign policies

== Affiliated organizations ==
- Ipas Development Foundation (IDF)
