= Modeste Kerekou =

Beninese politician

Minister of Small and Medium Enterprises and Employment Promotion of Benin
- Incumbent
- Assumed office 25 May 2021
- President: Patrice Talon

Personal details
- Born: Benin
- Party: Independent

Modeste Kerekou is a Beninese politician and educator. He is the current Minister of Small and Medium Enterprises and Employment Promotion in Benin, having been appointed to the position in early 2021 by the current president of Benin, Patrice Talon. His term began on 25 May 2021.

Awards and achievements
Preceded by	Minister of Small and Medium Enterprises and Employment Promotion of Benin	Succeeded by
