= Alain Orounla =

Beninese politician

Alain Sourou Orounla
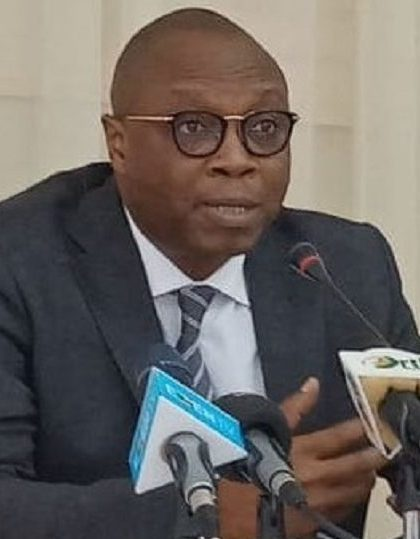

Minister of Communication and Post of Benin
- Incumbent
- Assumed office 25 May 2021
- President: Patrice Talon

Personal details
- Born: Benin
- Party: Independent

Alain Sourou Orounla is a Beninese politician and educator. He is the current Minister of Communication and Post in Benin, having been appointed to the position in early 2021 by the current president of Benin, Patrice Talon. His term began on 25 May 2021.

Awards and achievements
Preceded by	Minister of Communication and Post of Benin	Succeeded by
