= José Didier Tonato =

Beninese politician

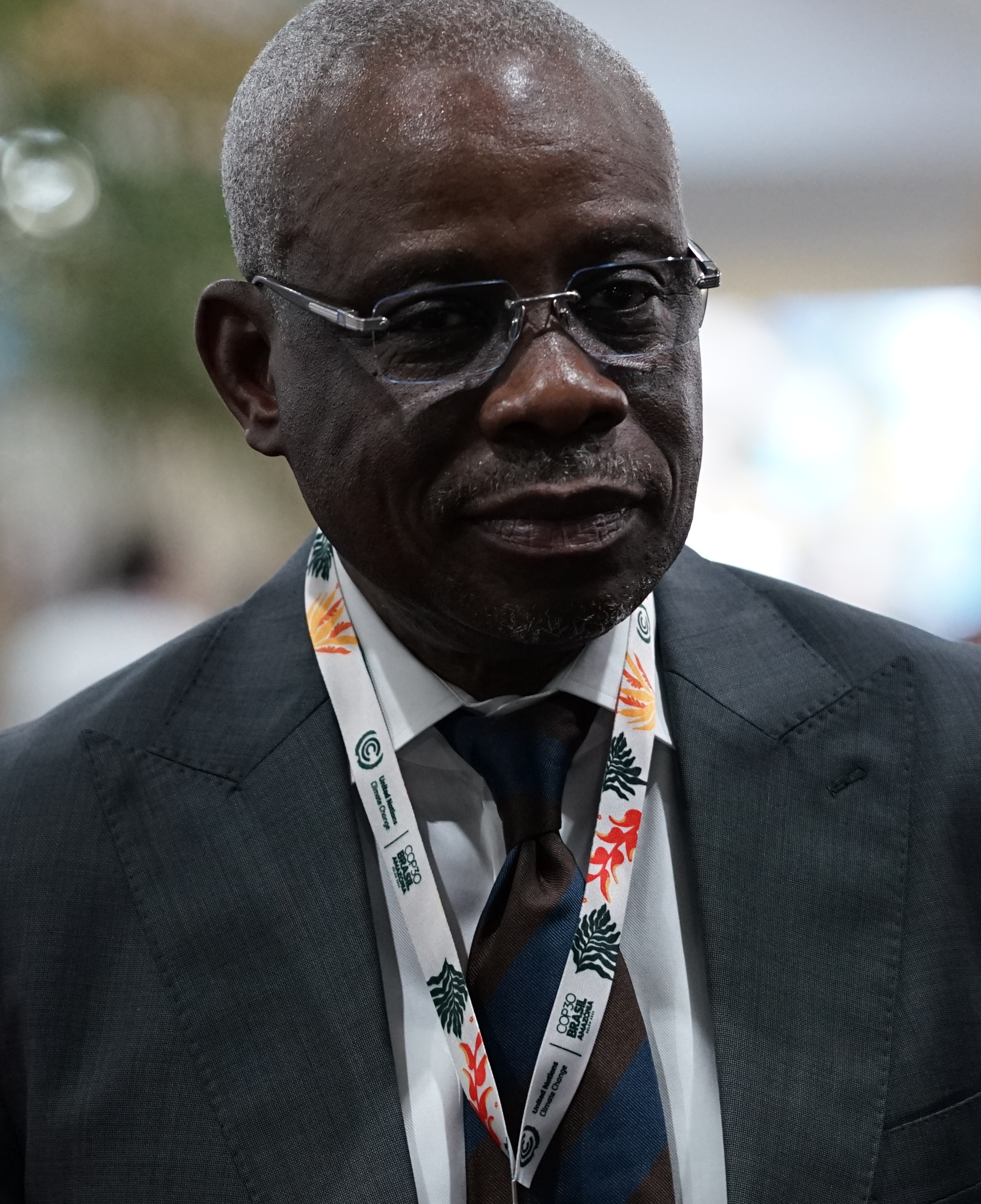
- Tonato at COP30 in 2025

Minister of Living Environment and Sustainable Development of Benin
- Incumbent
- Assumed office 25 May 2021
- President: Patrice Talon

Personal details
- Born: Benin
- Party: Independent

José Didier Tonato is a Beninese politician. He is the current Minister of Living Environment and Sustainable Development in Benin, having been appointed to the position in early 2021 by the current president of Benin, Patrice Talon. His term began on 25 May 2021.

Awards and achievements
Preceded by	Minister of Living Environment and Sustainable Development of Benin	Succeeded by
