= Adidjatou Mathys =

Beninese politician

Minister of Labour and Public Service of Benin
- Incumbent
- Assumed office 25 May 2021
- President: Patrice Talon

Personal details
- Born: Benin
- Party: Independent

Adidjatou Mathys is a Beninese politician and educator. She is the current Minister of Labour and Public Service in Benin, having been appointed to the position in early 2021 by the current president of Benin, Patrice Talon. Her term began on 25 May 2021.

Awards and achievements
Preceded by	Minister of Labour and Public Service of Benin	Succeeded by
