= Fortunet Alain Nouatin =

Beninese politician

Minister of National Defence of Benin
- In office 25 May 2021 – 26 May 2026
- President: Patrice Talon
- Preceded by: Candide Azzanaï
- Succeeded by: Gildas Agonkan

Personal details
- Born: Benin
- Party: Independent

Fortunet Alain Nouatin is a Beninese politician and educator. He served as the minister of national defence in Benin from 2021 to 2026.

Political offices
| Preceded by Candide Azannaï | Minister of National Defence of Benin; 2021 - 2026 | Succeeded by Gildas Agonkan |
