= National School of Applied Biosciences and Biotechnologies =

- Established: 2018
- Headquarters: Dassa-Zoumè
- Location: Benin
- Parent organization: Ministry of Higher Education and Scientific Research, National University of Sciences, Technologies, Engineering and Mathematics

The National School of Applied Biosciences and Biotechnologies (ENSBBA) is a public university center in Benin, affiliated with the National University of Sciences, Technologies, Engineering and Mathematics (UNSTIM). It is located in Dassa-Zoumè in the Collines Department.

== History and mission ==
ENSBBA was established by ministerial decree in 2018. This school was created to address the needs of companies and laboratories that use biotechnologies, such as the pharmaceutical and cosmetic industries, healthcare, agro-food, and the environment.
