= Annick Nonohou =

Beninese midwife (born 1974)

- Born: Annick Bidossessi Nonohou; 1974 (age 51–52); Benin
- Education: University of Abomey-Calavi
- Occupation: Midwife
- Years active: 2000–present
- Organization: Network of Parent-Friendly Caregivers
- Known for: Advocating for safer obstetric care in French-speaking Africa

Annick Bidossessi Nonohou Agani Yaï (born c. 1974) is a Beninese midwife and human rights activist. She is an advocate against gynaecological and obstetric violence in French-speaking Africa, as well as for midwives' rights, and in 2013 founded the Network of Parent-Friendly Caregivers that campaigns for safer childbirth.

== Early life and education ==
Nonohou was born around 1974 in northern Benin, and spent part of her childhood in neighbouring Niger. As a child, Nonohou witnessed her mother receiving inadequate obstetric care, including medical staff not helping her when she fell off the delivery table, and refusing to treat her after erroneously believing she had died, while she gave birth to Nonohou's sibling. Nonohou later stated this experience led to her wishing to train as a midwife. As an adult, Nonohou married Agani Yaï.

In 1999, Nonohou graduated as a midwife from the Institut national médico-sanitaire within the University of Abomey-Calavi. In 2005, she returned to the institution to study for a master's degree in public law, and later for a master of research in human rights and democracy.

Additionally, Nonohou has supported rights of orphans, including gender-based abuse.

== Activism ==
=== Initial midwifery career (2000–2013) ===
Nonohou began working as a midwife in 2000, initially at the Plateau Clinic in Abomey-Calavi. She has gone on to work at various different healthcare settings, including Parakou Military Maternity Hospital, Borgou Departmental Hospital Centre, and the Centre hospitalier et universitaire de la mère et de l'enfant lagune in Cotonou.

Nonohou became a public advocate for the implementation of non-violent methods of childbirth, first in Benin and later expanding to French-speaking Africa. She has described forms of childbirth violence, "normalised" by medical institutions, as including the commonly-held rule that fathers were not permitted to be present during the birth; forcing mothers to give birth in the supine position, often on beds with no mattresses; and using medical procedures such as caesarean sections, episiotomies, vacuum extractions and forceps unnecessarily. Nonohou also commented on the poor treatment received by some mothers from medical staff, including being verbally abused; being restrained or hit if they are not considered to be pushing hard enough; and being denied pain relief. She also acknowledged racketeering among some professionals, including forcing a woman to pay a bribe in order to receive the body of her stillborn child. At the same time, Nonohou called for there to be greater recognition of the pressures on midwives that can lead to subpar practice, including high rates of physical and sexual violence from patients and other medical staff.

=== Creation of the Network of Patient-Friendly Caregivers (2013–2023) ===
Nonohou completed internships provided through the Japan International Cooperation Agency to observe safe childbirth practices in Japan and Morocco. In 2013, she established the Network of Patient-Friendly Caregivers (French: Réseau des Soignants Amis des Patients, RSAP), a non-governmental organisation based in Tankpè, with the aim of reducing gynaecological and obstetric violence. Nonohou has called for obstetrics to be overhauled to revolve around "human rights-based obstestric practice", including having the midwifery curricula and hospital care protocols to be rewritten to reflect this. This included promoting the voice of parents in decision-making, a strategy that was later accredited by the Ministry of Health. Nonohou has provided academic supervision to public health students at the university.

In 2017, Nonohou was named Midwife of the Year by Espoir Plus, a non-governmental organisation, at a ceremony in Cotonou. That same year, the World Health Organisation recognised Nonohou as a leading midwife in sub-Saharan Africa for the quality of care offered in maternal, newborn, child and adolescent health.

As of 2022, RSAP operated in Benin, Burkina Faso, the Ivory Coast, Gabon, Guinea, Mali, Niger, Senegal, Togo and the Democratic Republic of the Congo. In 2023, Nonohou resigned from RSAP's executive board, though remained its honorary president as of 2025.

=== Work with the Beninese government (2023–present) ===
In 2012, Nonohou praised new legislation passed by the Beninese government concerning violence against women for covering childbirth, but criticised it for not specifically including pregnant women, women in labour, and postpartum women. In 2021, Nonohou criticised new legislation passed by the Beninese government concerning the protection of people's health for not mentioning obstetric violence; though she did praise it for recognising midwives as healthcare professionals. In 2022, Nonohou publicly noted that positive changes made in Benin between 2014 and 2019 at hospitals in the Atlantique and Littoral departments had declined despite support and equipment from the Japan International Cooperation Agency, and called on the Beninese government to investigate this further.

In 2023, Nonohou was appointed by the President of Benin, Patrice Talon, as head of the Victim Assistance Unit at the National Institute for Women. Nonohou has also worked with Amnesty International, conducting awareness sessions with communities living in northern Benin and campaigning for patients' rights.

In 2026, Nonohou was among 160 Beninese women recognised by the Ministry of Social Affairs; she was recognised for her campaigns for safe childbirth and against gynaelogical and obstetric violence in French-speaking Africa.
