= René Assouman Joeffrey =

Rwandan footballer (born 2002)

Personal information
- Full name: René Assouman Joeffrey
- Date of birth: 11 December 2002 (age 23)
- Place of birth: Kigali, Rwanda
- Position: Midfielder

Team information
- Current team: Hillerød IF

Senior career*
Years	Team	Apps	(Gls)
2018–2019	B.93		
2019–	Hillerød IF		

International career^{‡}
2022–	Rwanda	1	(0)
- * Club domestic league appearances and goals ‡ National team caps and goals as of 18:30, 10 February 2022 (UTC)

René Assouman Joeffrey (born 11 December 2002) is a Rwandan footballer who currently plays for Hillerød IF in the Danish 2nd Division and the Rwanda national team.

== Youth ==
Joeffrey was born in Rwanda to a DR Congolese father and Rwandan mother. His family moved to Denmark when he was nine years old, and he began playing football at the age of twelve.

== International career ==
In July 2021, Joeffrey received his first international call-up for Rwanda ahead of the 2021 CECAFA U-23 Challenge Cup. However, Rwanda withdrew from the competition due to the COVID-19 pandemic. He was called up to the senior squad in December 2021 for two friendly matches against Guinea in January 2022. He made his senior international debut on 3 January 2022 in the first match of the series.

=== International career statistics ===
As of match played 3 January 2022

Rwanda national team
Year	Apps	Goals
2022	1	0
Total	1	0
