= Lacina Koné =

Ivorian technology executive and policy leader

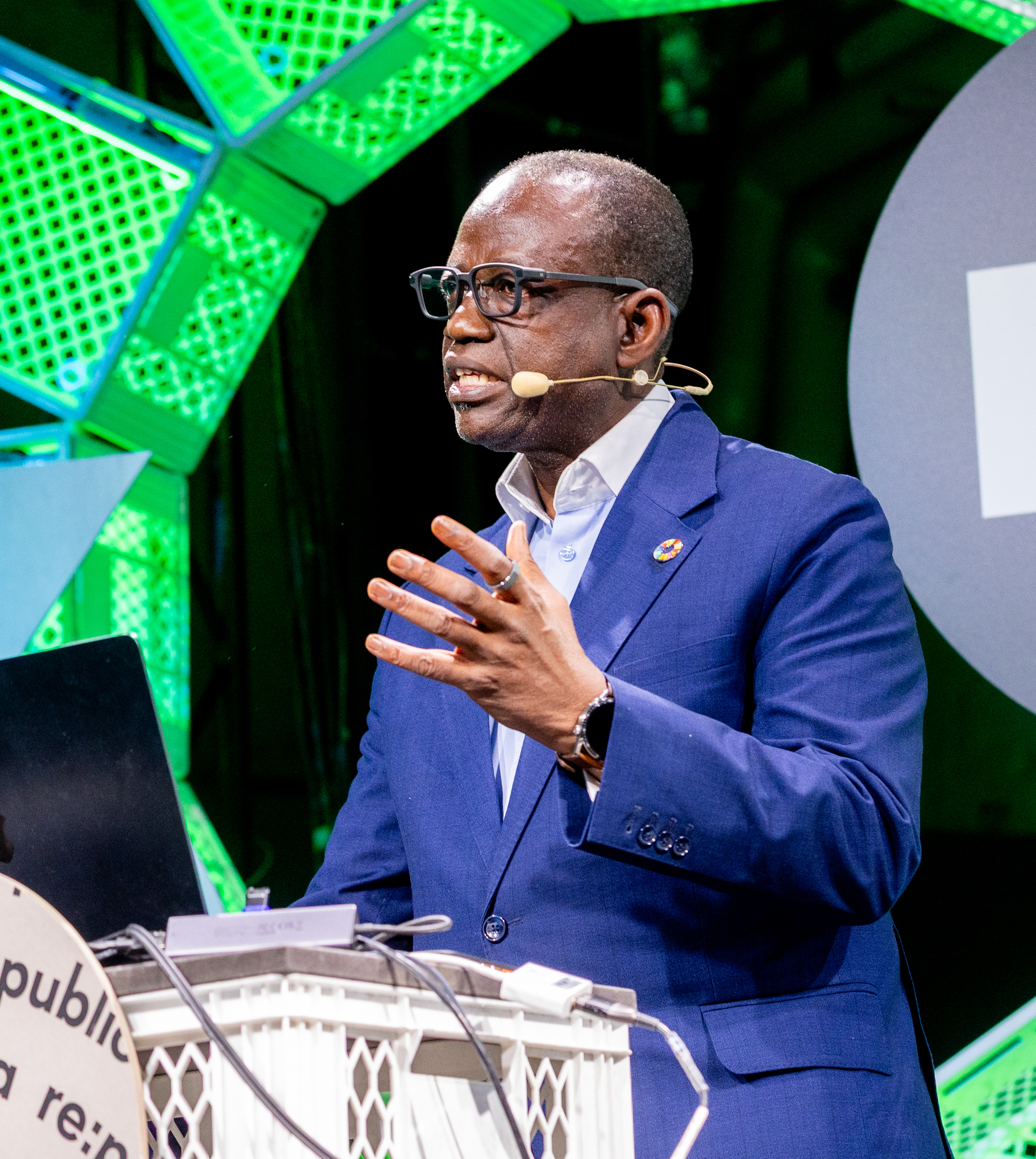
- Koné in 2026
- Education: Ajman University (BSc, 1993)
- Occupation: Technology executive
- Years active: 1990s–present
- Title: Director-General and CEO, Smart Africa

Lacina Koné is an Ivorian technology executive who serves as the Director-General and Chief Executive Officer of Smart Africa, a pan-African initiative endorsed by the African Union to accelerate the continent’s digital transformation.

== Early life and education ==
Koné earned his bachelor's degree from Ajman University in 1993 and later completed postgraduate studies in engineering and management.

== Career ==
Before joining Smart Africa, Koné served as Senior Adviser to the President and the Prime Minister of Ivory Coast from 2011 to 2017, where he contributed to national ICT strategies and digital identity programs. He became Director-General of Smart Africa in 2019 and has led major continental projects such as the Africa Smart Broadband 2025 Strategy and Smart Villages Program.

== Recognition ==
Koné has been featured by international organizations for his contribution to Africa’s digital policy ecosystem.
