= Dona Jean-Claude Houssou =

Beninese politician

Minister of Energy of Benin
- Incumbent
- Assumed office 25 May 2021
- President: Patrice Talon

Personal details
- Born: Benin
- Party: Independent

Dona Jean-Claude Houssou is a Beninese politician and educator. He is the current Minister of Energy in Benin, having been appointed to the position in early 2021 by the current president of Benin, Patrice Talon. His term began on 25 May 2021.

Awards and achievements
Preceded by	Minister of Energy of Benin	Succeeded by
