= Véronique Tognifodé Mewanou =

Beninese politician

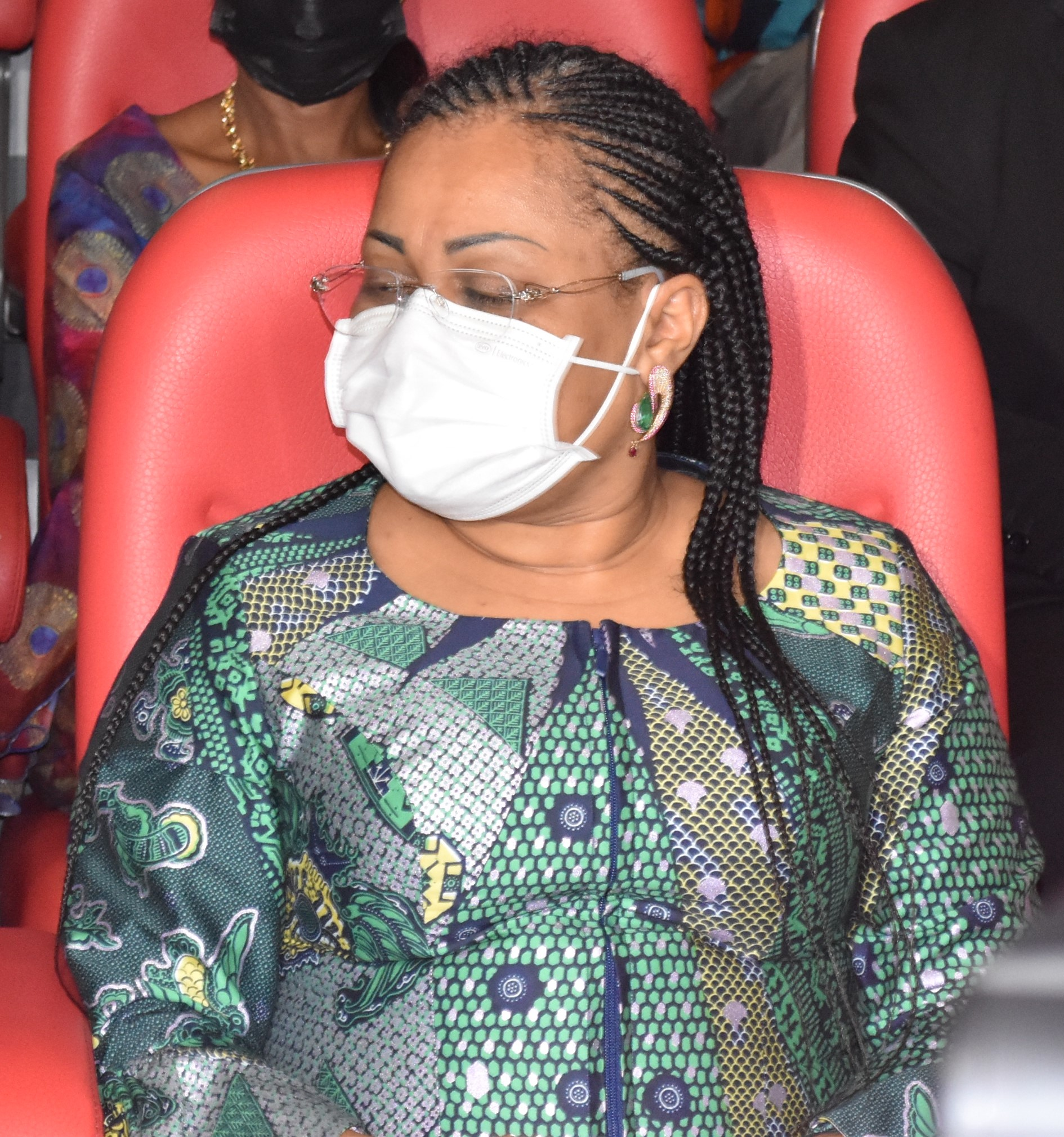

Minister of Social Affairs and Micro-Finance of Benin
- Incumbent
- Assumed office 25 May 2021
- President: Patrice Talon

Personal details
- Born: Benin
- Party: Independent

Véronique Tognifodé Mewanou is a Beninese politician and educator. She is the current Minister of Social Affairs and Micro-Finance in Benin, having been appointed to the position in early 2021 by the current president of Benin, Patrice Talon. Her term began on 25 May 2021.

Awards and achievements
Preceded by	Minister of Social Affairs and Micro-Finance of Benin	Succeeded by
