= Shadiya Alimatou Assouman =

Beninese politician

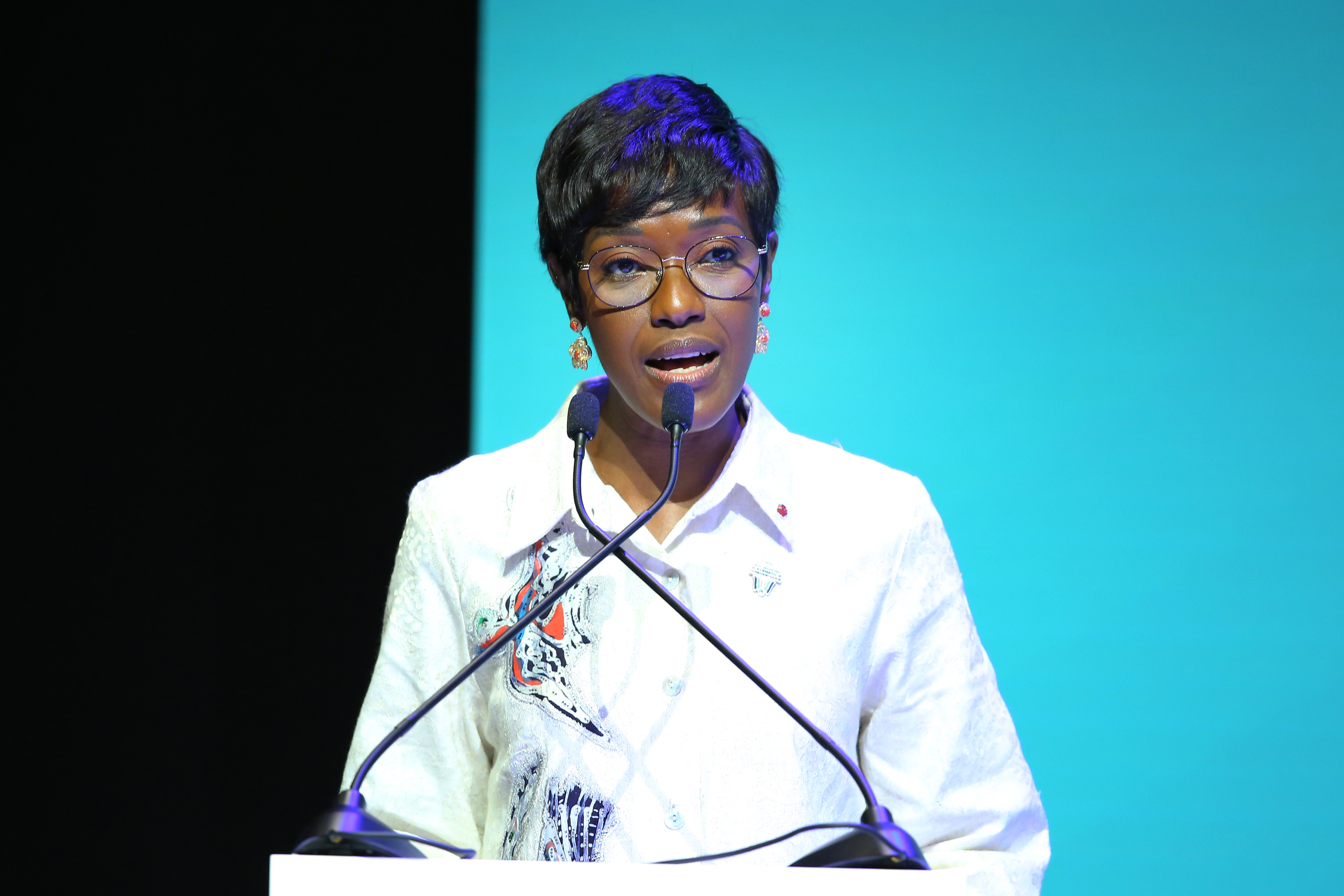

Minister of Industry and Trade of Benin
- Incumbent
- Assumed office 25 May 2021
- President: Patrice Talon

Personal details
- Born: Benin
- Party: Independent

Shadiya Alimatou Assouman is a Beninese politician and educator. Shee is the current Minister of Industry and Trade in Benin, having been appointed to the position in early 2021 by the current president of Benin, Patrice Talon. Her term began on 25 May 2021.

Awards and achievements
Preceded by	Minister of Industry and Trade of Benin	Succeeded by
