= Aurélie Adam Soule =

Beninese politician (born 1984)

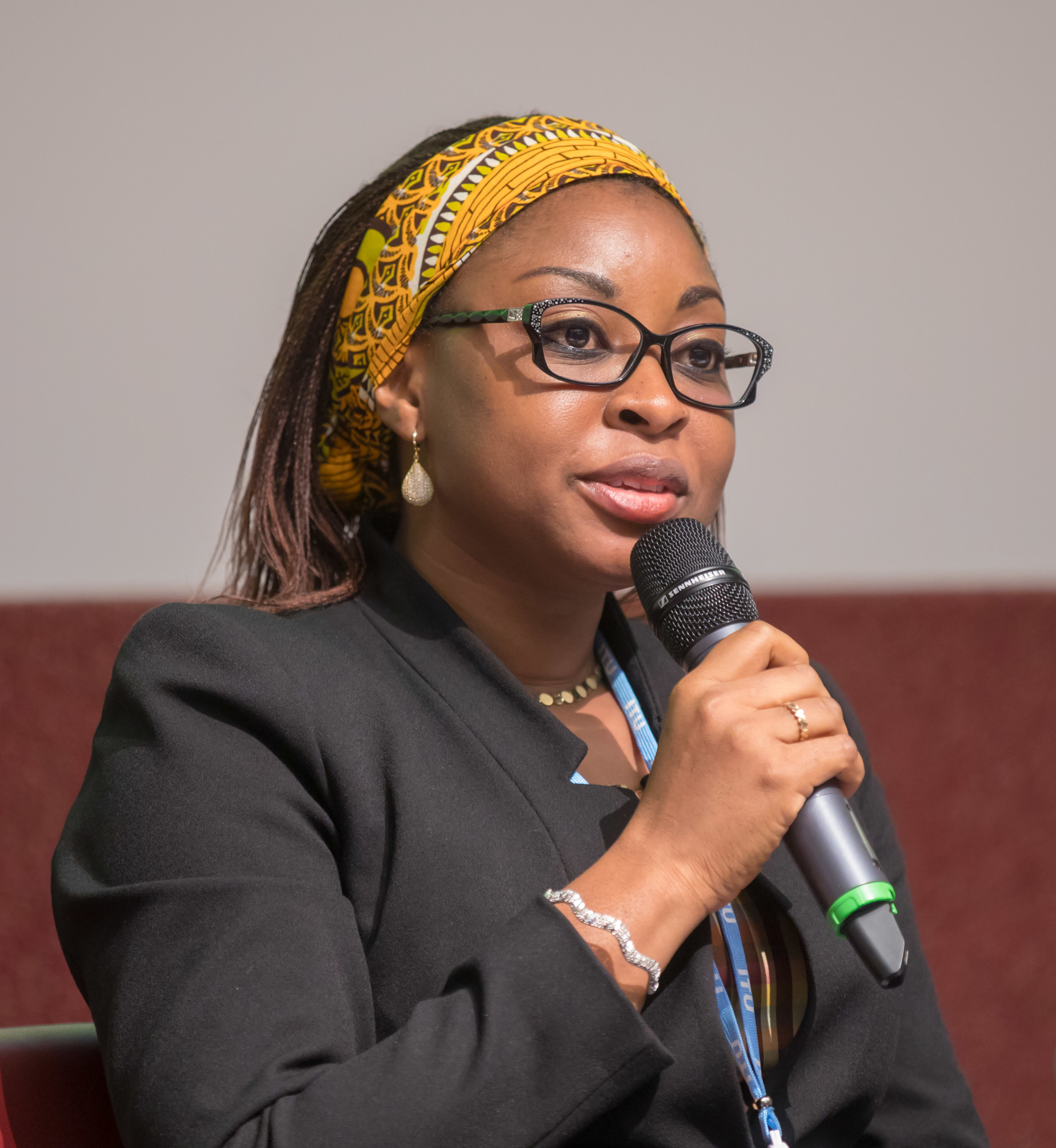

Minister of Digital Economy and Communications

Personal details
- Born: 1984 (age 41–42) Nikki, Benin

Aurélie Adam Soule or Aurélie Adam Soule Zoumarou (born 1984) is a Beninese politician who serves as Minister of Digital Economy and Communications in the Cabinet of Benin.

== Early life and career ==
Soule was born in Nikki in 1984. She has a technology based master's degree from Telecom SudParis and a Certificate in Management of Public Policies and Leadership from Syracuse University in New York. She worked in France and returned to Benin in 2008.

== Political career ==
Soule was appointed the Minister of Digital Economy and Communications for Benin. in October 2017 by President Patrice Talon.

In November 2018, United Nations Secretary General António Guterres appointed Soule to the United Nations Task Force on Digital Financing of Sustainable Development Goals, co-chaired by Maria Ramos and Achim Steiner.

Soule was elected to chair the ministers of French-speaking nations who are working together to improve their medium and long terms plans for the digital economy in 2019. Soule encouraged further digitization supported by UNCTAD in Benin. Laws had been written to regulate the e-economy, but they had not been passed. Soule noted that the coronavirus pandemic in 2020 provided an opportunity for further e-commerce.
