= Benjamin Hounkpatin =

Beninese politician

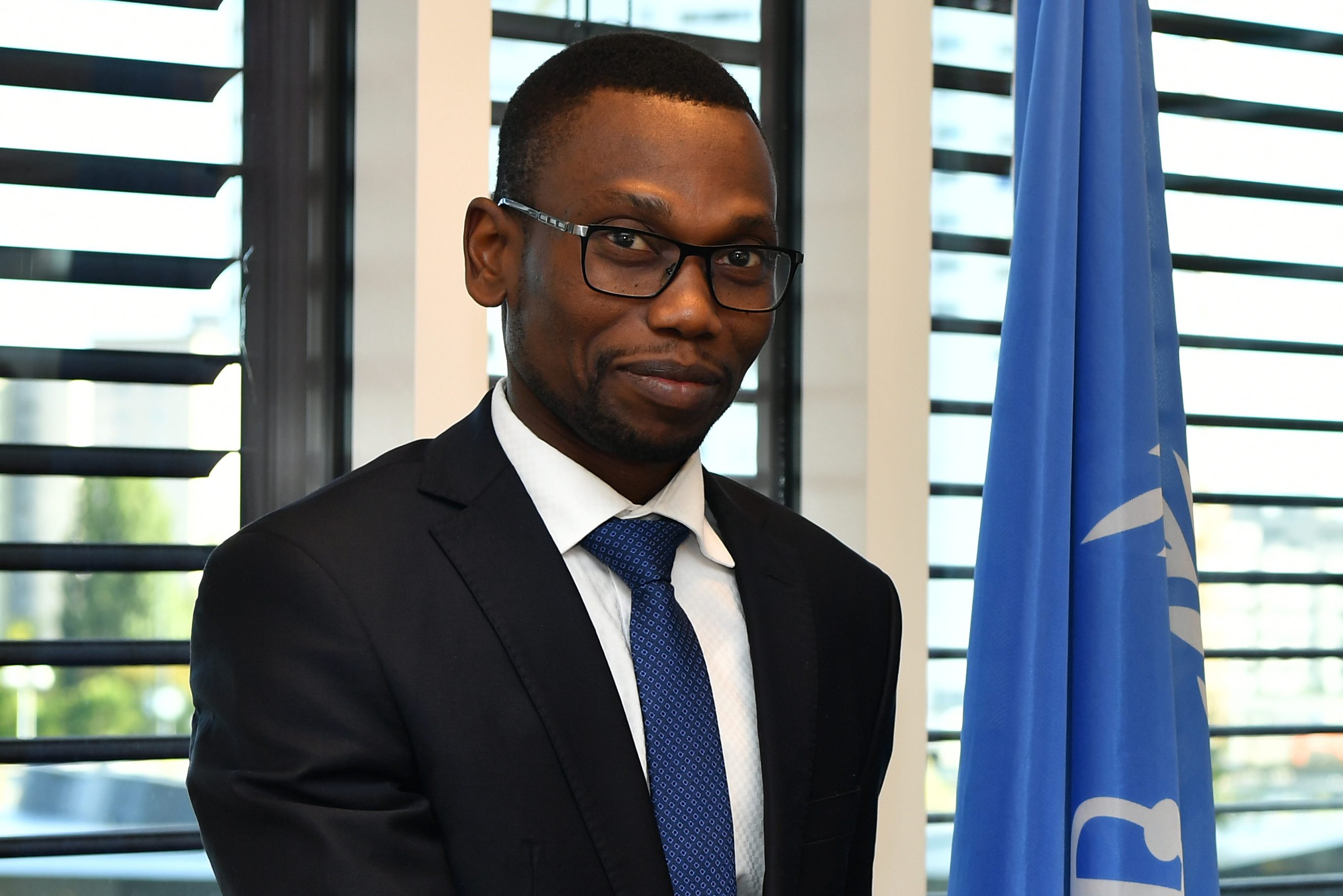

Minister of Health of Benin
- Incumbent
- Assumed office 25 May 2021
- President: Patrice Talon

Personal details
- Born: Benin
- Party: Independent

Benjamin Hounkpatin is a Beninese politician and educator. He is the current Minister of Health in Benin, having been appointed to the position in early 2021 by the current president of Benin, Patrice Talon. His term began on 25 May 2021.

Awards and achievements
Preceded by	Minister of Health of Benin	Succeeded by
