= University of Abomey-Calavi =

Public university in Benin

- Université d'Abomey-Calavi
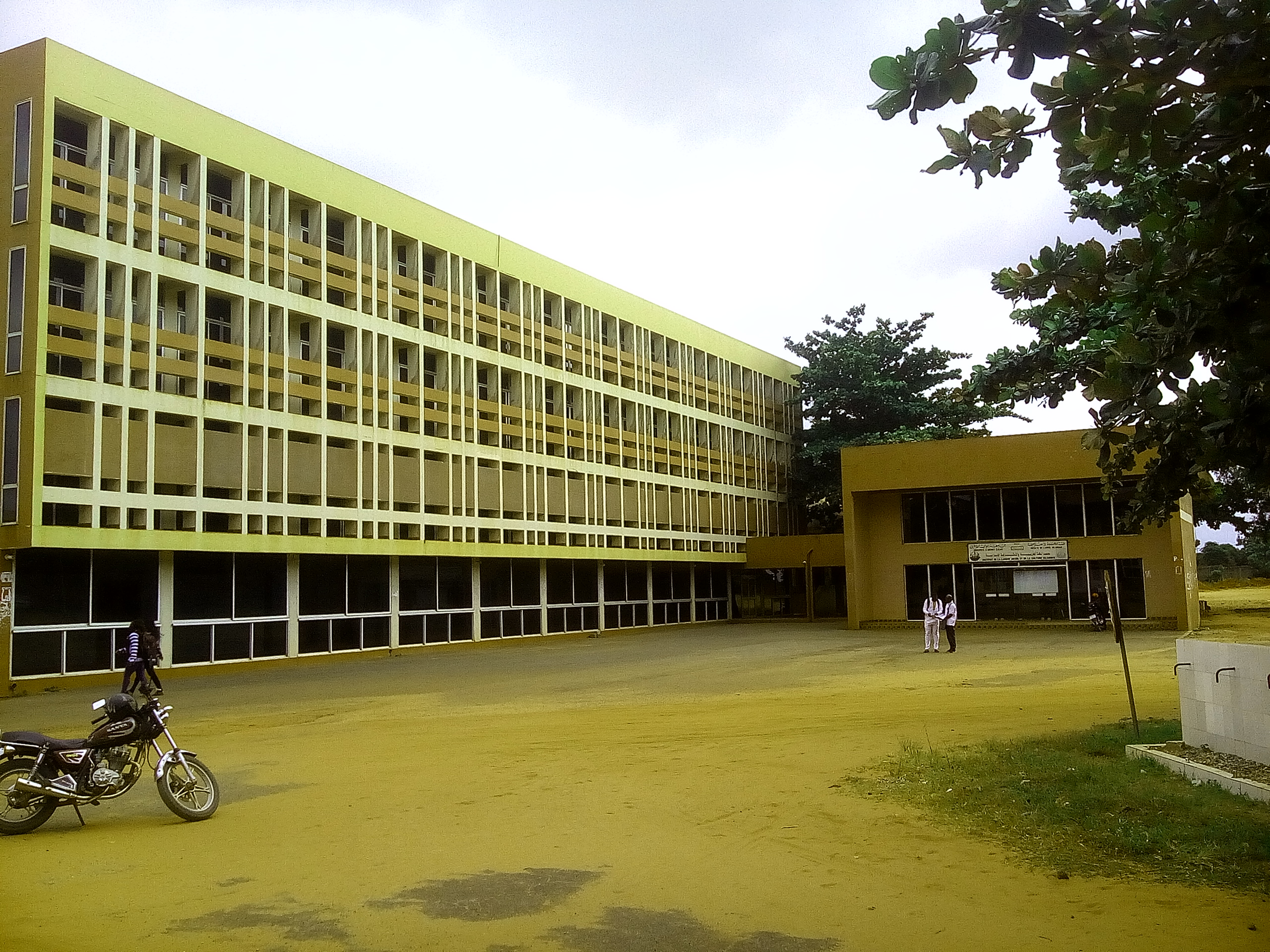
- Former name: Université du Dahomey
- Type: public university
- Established: 1970; 56 years ago
- Affiliations: Association of African Universities, Agence universitaire de la Francophonie
- Rector: Maxime da Cruz
- Location: Abomey-Calavi, Atlantique Department, Benin; 6.441°N 2.352°E
- Website: http://www.uac.bj/

The University of Abomey-Calavi (French: Université d'Abomey-Calavi) is the principal public university in the west African country of Benin. The university is located in the city of Abomey-Calavi in the south of the country.

The school is composed of 19 institutions and six campuses. The university has a number of undergraduate and postgraduate programmes offered at a range of locations across the area. It is a member school of the Association of African Universities and Agence universitaire de la Francophonie.

== History ==
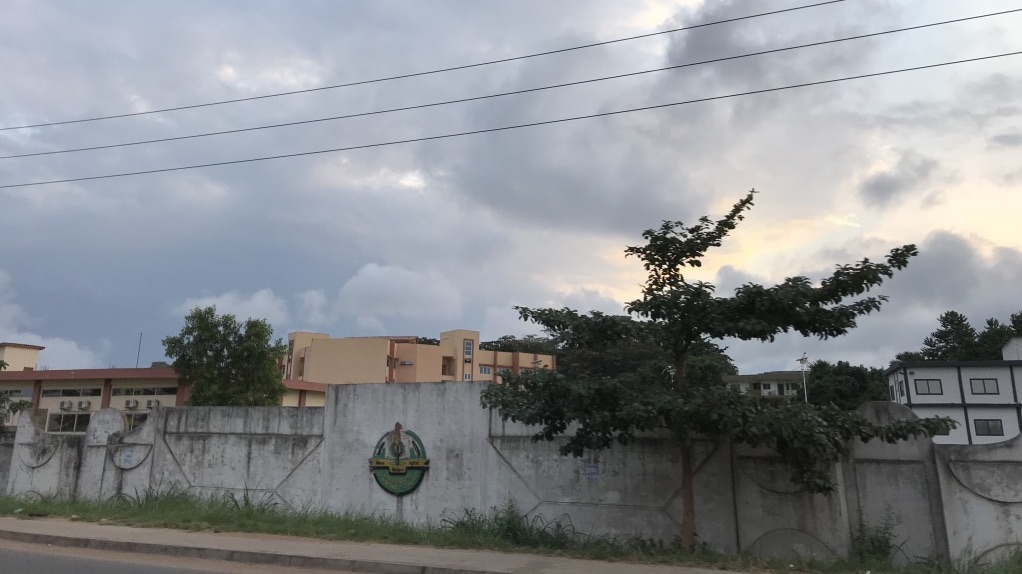
Main campus of Université d'Abomey-Calavi

The university was founded in 1970 as the Université du Dahomey. In 1975 the name was changed to Université Nationale du Bénin. In 2001, the university took its current name. Enrollment at UAC was over 16,000 in 1999, including over 3,300 women.

== Schools ==
The Université d'Abomey-Calavi is located in Abomey-Calavi. Constituent institutions of the UAC include:

- Ecole Polytechnique d’Abomey-Calavi (EPAC)
- Institut des Langues Arabes et de Cultures Islamique (ILACI)
- Institut Confucius
- Institut Universitaire de Technologie (IUT) & Ecole Normale Supérieure de l’Enseignement Technique (ENSET) de Lokossa
- Institut Régional de Santé Publique (IRSP)
- Ecole Normale Supérieure (ENS)
- Ecole Nationale d’Economie Appliquée et de Management (ENEAM)
- Ecole Nationale d’Administration et de Magistrature (ENAM)
- Institut de Mathématiques et de Sciences Physiques (IMSP) (Formation Doctorale)
- Institut National de la Jeunesse de l’Education Physique et du Sport (INJEPS)
- Faculté des Sciences Agronomiques (FSA)
- Faculté des Lettres, Arts et Sciences Humaines (FLASH)
- Faculté des Sciences de la Santé (FSS)
- Faculté des Sciences Economiques (FASEG)
- Faculté de Droit et de Sciences Politiques (FADESP)
- Faculté des Sciences et Techniques (FAST)

== Notable alumni ==
- Yézoumi Akogo - agricultural scientist.
- Annick Nonohou - midwife.
