= 2026 Beninese presidential election =

Election of Romuald Wadagni

- 12 April 2026
- Registered: 7,897,287
- Turnout: 63.57% (▲12.94pp)
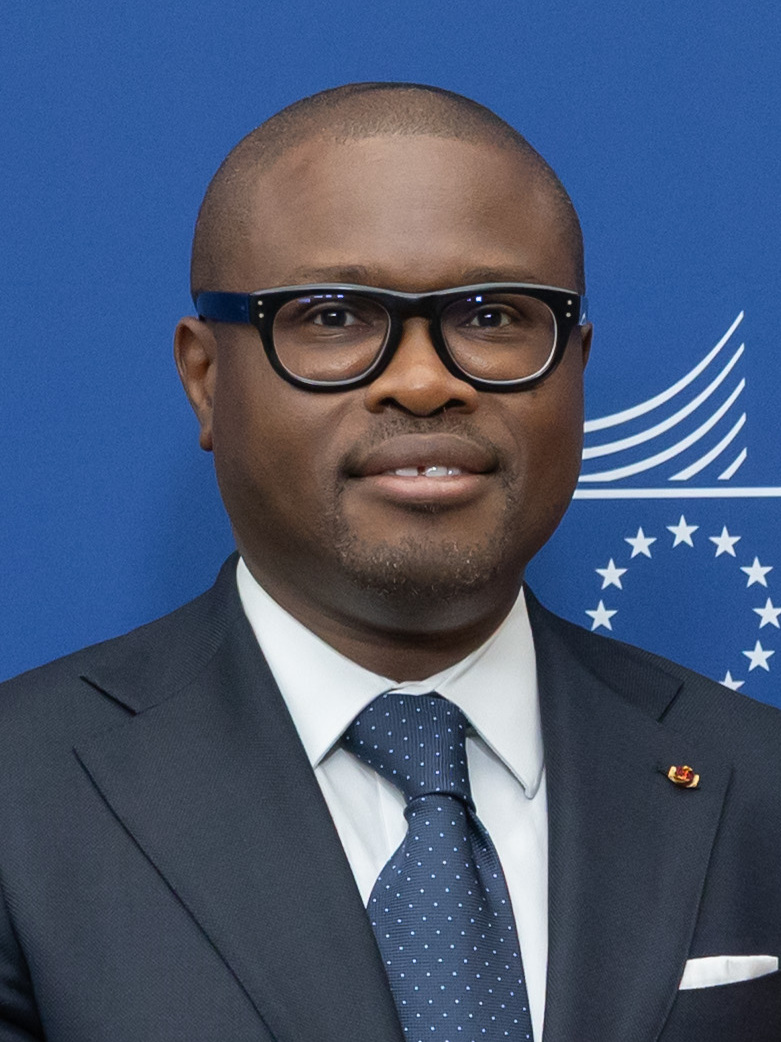

Nominee	Romuald Wadagni	Paul Hounkpè
Party	Independent	FCBE
Alliance	UPR and BR
Running mate	Mariam Chabi Talata	Judicael Hounwanou
Popular vote	4,575,449	278,297
Percentage	94.27%	5.73%
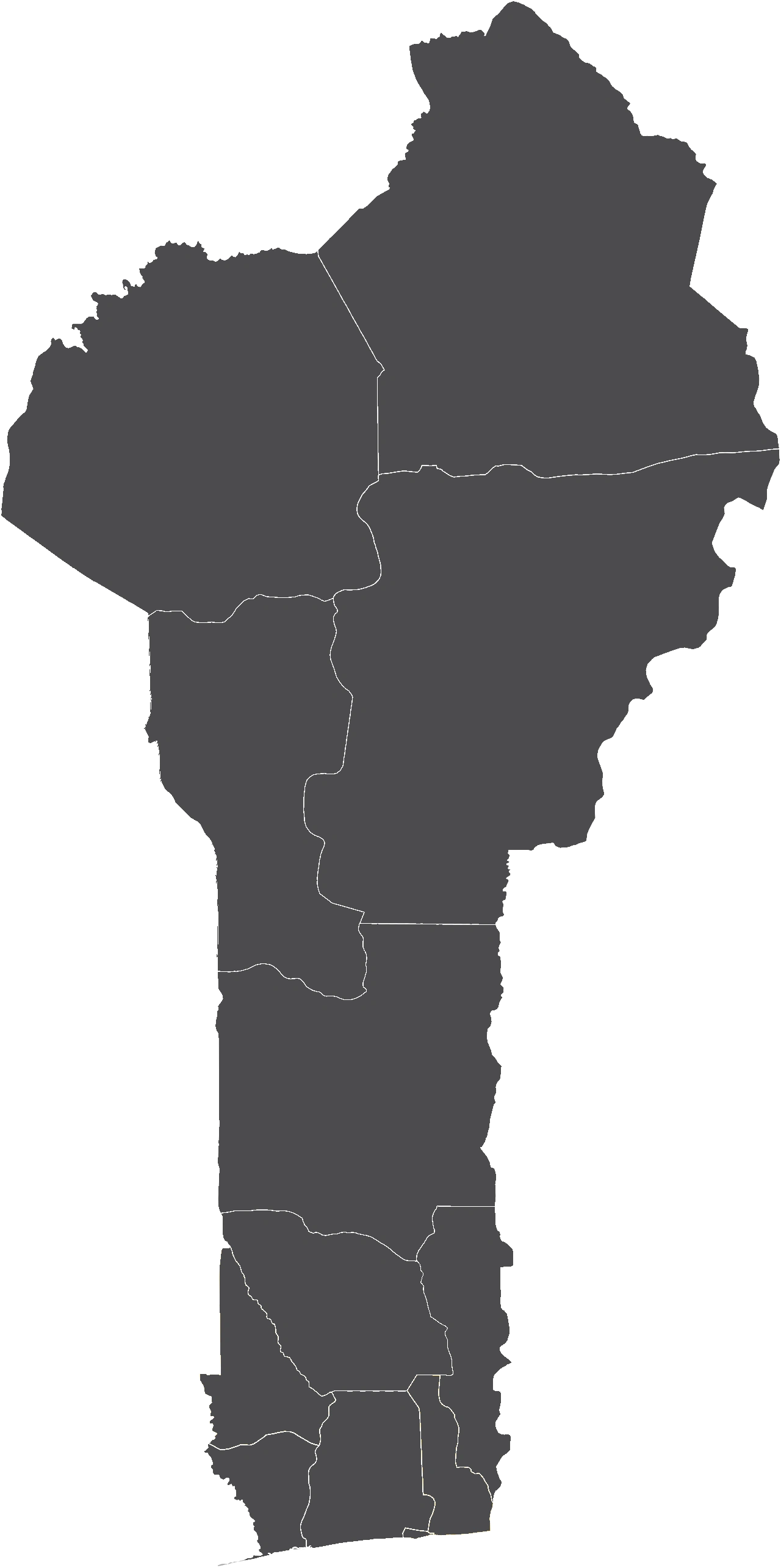
President before election
Patrice Talon
Independent
Elected President
Romuald Wadagni
Independent

Presidential elections were held in Benin on 12 April 2026, following the 11 January parliamentary elections conducted in accordance with the national electoral code. President Patrice Talon, serving his second and final constitutional term, had maintained that he would not seek a constitutional amendment to pursue re-election. The contest, which international observers characterized as neither free nor fair, resulted in a landslide victory for Finance Minister Romuald Wadagni, who officially secured more than 94% of the vote. No credible opposition candidate was allowed to be on the ballot, and the primary opposition party, the Democrats, failed to field a candidate.

The election process was defined by the marginalization of the Beninese opposition. Candidates struggled to meet the legal requirement of securing endorsements from 15% of the country's members of parliament (MPs) in the National Assembly of Benin and mayors. Kémi Séba announced his candidacy in January 2025 but did not qualify for the ballot; an arrest warrant was subsequently issued after he voiced support for the 2025 Beninese coup attempt.

Other prospective candidates, such as Prince Anatole Ouinsavi and Elisabeth Agbossaga, were declared ineligible by the National Autonomous Electoral Commission (CENA) in October 2025. Prospective Democrat candidate Renaud Agbodjo, who failed to meet requirements such as sufficient legislative sponsorship and payment of a registration fee, was rejected by the court on 27 October after an appeal. Paul Hounkpè, candidate for the Cowry Forces for an Emerging Benin (FCBE) as the sole opposition candidate on the ballot, received less than 6% of the vote.

== Background ==
=== Preceding elections ===
The 2021 presidential election saw incumbent president Patrice Talon being re-elected to office. In 2023, parliamentary elections saw victory for the parties that supported Talon, with Progressive Union Renewal (UPR) winning a plurality of 53 seats and the Republican Bloc (BR) gaining 28 seats. The only opposition party to cross the electoral threshold was the Democrats (LD), which also won 28 seats. Éric Houndété, leader of the LD opposition party, accused the parties that supported Talon of vote buying and ballot stuffing in the 2023 elections without providing evidence, saying, "The Democrats reject this result, which does not reflect the will of the people to make our party the first political force in our country." Supported by the 81 seats of the UPR and BR, Talon retained control of the government following a thwarted 2025 Beninese coup attempt and is expected to serve until his term concludes in 2026.

In the 2026 parliamentary election, the presidential coalition consisting of both the UPR and BR were the only parties that were eligible for seats, with the parties gaining 60 and 49 seats respectively. The Democrats, the main opposition, were ineligible to gain seats because the party did not gain 20% of the vote in all electoral constituencies. Nearly two months after the parliamentary elections, Thomas Boni Yayi stepped down as the leader of The Democrats, citing health reasons.

=== Talon's second term ===
Between the parliamentary elections of 2023 and the presidential election of 2026, Talon's second term was marked by the resurgence of coup plots relating to the Coup Belt and the creation of the Alliance of Sahel States (AES) in July 2024. A coup d'état in neighboring Niger in July 2023 and the ensuing Nigerien crisis saw Talon expressing support for ousted president Mohamed Bazoum and condemnation of the coup.

The authorities announced the discovery of a coup plot against Talon in September 2024, scheduled for 27 September and led by the businessman and Talon ally Olivier Boko. Former sports minister Oswald Homeky and the commander of the Republican Guard were named as co-conspirators, leading to the arrest of Boko and Homeky. Both were convicted and sentenced in January 2025 to 20 years imprisonment and a fine of 60 billion CFA francs ($95 million).

In November 2025, a constitutional amendment was approved by Benin's National Assembly, extending presidential and legislative terms from five to seven years and creating a Senate, expected to have between 25 and 30 members including Benin's former heads of state and other members appointed by the president. This upper house would have the power to request a second reading of the laws approved by the National Assembly, with some exceptions. The reforms were validated by the Constitutional Court of Benin in December 2025.

=== 2025 coup attempt ===
Mutinous soldiers led by Pascal Tigri began a coup attempt on 7 December 2025, seizing residences and abducting top-ranking military officials. Following this, National Guard units attacked the Presidential Palace in Cotonou in the early morning, where they were later repulsed by presidential guards. The insurgents retreated through alleyways to the national broadcaster SRTB, where they held workers hostage.

At SRTB, a group of eight rebelling soldiers, accompanied by Tigri, declared that Talon had been "removed from office as president of the republic". They also announced the suspension of the constitution and state institutions, and identified themselves as the Military Committee for Refoundation (French: Comité Militaire pour la Refondation, CMR). The CMR later announced that all borders were closed and that all political parties were suspended. The soldiers cited multiple reasons for staging the coup, such as Talon's management of the country, favoritism in the military, the neglect of soldiers killed on duty and their relatives, the deteriorating security situation in northern Benin, cuts to healthcare, increased taxes, and restrictions on political activity. After the announcement, the signal to SRTB was shut off but was restored later in the day.

Following two requests for assistance by the Beninese government, the Nigerian Air Force was deployed to Cotonou to dislodge the putschists, where precision airstrikes upon Camp Togbin were reported. Several putschists were killed. Nigeria also expelled the coup plotters from the state television headquarters and immobilized several armored vehicles. Nigerian ground forces entered Benin shortly after. This marked Nigeria's first foreign military intervention since the 2017 Gambian constitutional crisis. The French government also said that it had provided surveillance, observation and logistical assistance to the FAB to help thwart the coup, with president Emmanuel Macron leading a "coordination effort" and being in contact with president Talon and ECOWAS representatives.

Benin's interior minister, Alassane Seidou stated that the FAB thwarted the attempted coup at 11:09. At least 14 people were arrested, including 12 active-duty soldiers and another who was dismissed. Twelve suspects are believed to have participated in the attack on state television. Tigri and several of his men remained fugitives by the night of 9 December. Tigri later fled to Lomé, Togo and then Burkina Faso, before finding refuge in Niamey, Niger. Later that evening, President Talon appeared on television and reiterated the failure of the coup, while promising to punish "this treachery". Weapons were also discovered stashed in the Togbin, Fidjrosse, and Akogbato neighborhoods. Following the attack, roads to and from the Presidential Palace were closed, with police officers in front diverting traffic from the scene. Traffic elsewhere in Cotonou was normal.

==== Post-coup arrests and reactions ====
Following the coup attempt, the Beninese government initiated a series of arrests and issued warrants for individuals suspected of involvement or support. On 15 December, at least 30 suspects appeared before the Special Criminal Court (CRIET). Among those detained were high-profile figures including Candide Azannaï, head of the Restaurer l'Espoir (Restore Hope) party, on 12 December, and Chabi Yayi, son of former president Thomas Boni Yayi, who was arrested at his residence on 14 December for his alleged role in the coup attempt.

Kémi Séba, a candidate in the 2026 presidential election and pro-AES and pro-Russian blogger, expressed his support for the coup while it was ongoing. Other pro-AES social media accounts posted claims heralding the coup's success as soon as news broke. Séba's support of the coup, along with similar support statements from Sabi Korogone, would result in an arrest warrant for both people being issued by Benin's government.

The Democrats condemned the coup and released a statement supporting the Beninese government. Boni Yayi himself released a statement in support of the government on 7 December, expressing solidarity with Talon. The Islamic Union of Benin released a similar statement. The Cowry Forces for an Emerging Benin (FCBE) political party also condemned the coup attempt and released a statement in support of the government. Former president Nicéphore Soglo also released a statement supporting the government.

== Electoral system ==
After a constitutional amendment in 2025, the president of Benin is now elected by a two-round system to a seven-year term. If no candidate receives a majority of the vote in the first round, the top-two candidates compete in a second round organized within fifteen days of the first round. Presidents are limited to two terms, even if they are not consecutive. Since a constitutional amendment adopted in November 2019, each presidential candidate has to run with a vice-presidential running mate. This running mate also has a seven-year term following the 2025 amendment and is charged with completing the president's term in case of impeachment or other impediment.

Candidates for the presidency have to be a Beninese citizen, either by birth or by having lived in Benin for the past ten years, be of "good character and great probity", have all their civil and political rights, be between 40 and 70 years of age, and submit to a physical and mental assessment by three doctors sworn in by the Constitutional Court. A 2019 constitutional amendment also requires candidates to be nominated by no less than 10% of the total of members of parliament and mayors, approximately 16 officials. A 2024 amendment later increased the combined endorsement of all MPs and mayors to 15%, equivalent to 28 elected officials as of 2026. In 2026, the nomination fee for a candidate was the equivalent of about £328,000 (approximately 250 million West African CFA francs).

== Election calendar ==
On 12 August 2025, the Autonomous National Electoral Commission (CENA) published the electoral calendar for the presidential elections during a press release.

Election timetable
Dates	Activities
15 July 2025	Receipt of statistics from the computerized electoral roll
18 July 2025	Publication of the decision listing required documents and procedures for submitting candidacies
10–14 October 2025	Registration of candidacies for the presidential election
15–29 October 2025	Posting of the electoral roll
26 October 2025	Publication of the provisional list of candidates that submitted files for the presidential elections
31 October 2025	Publication of the final list of candidates for the presidential elections
26 March 2026	Delivery of sample ballots to candidates in the race
27 March 2026 to 10 April 2026	Electoral campaign for the first round
12 April 2026	Election day Counting of votes at polling stations Compilation of results
14 April 2026	Publication of the provisional results for the first round of the presidential election
Late April to early May 2026	Official results for the first round of the presidential election

== Candidates ==
In September 2025, the ruling coalition in the National Assembly, consisting of UPR and the BR, nominated Finance Minister Romuald Wadagni as a candidate for the elections, with Talon confirming he would not seek a third term. CENA later declared that only Wadagni and Paul Hounkpè, and their running mates, met the requirements to run. An appeal by Renaud Agbodjo of The Democrats, who failed to meet requirements such as sufficient sponsorship and payment of the registration fee, was rejected by the court on 27 October.

=== Allowed to run ===
- Romuald Wadagni (VP: Mariam Chabi Talata)
- Paul Hounkpè (VP: Judicael Hounwanou)

=== Declared ===
As President:

- Kémi Séba
- Romuald Wadagni (VP: Mariam Chabi Talata)
- Paul Hounkpè (VP: Judicael Hounwanou)
- Prince Anatole Ouinsavi (VP: Agathe Bello)
- Renaud Agbodjo (VP: Bonaventure Lodjou)
- Elisabeth Agbossaga (VP: Boni Neto Gansare)

== Campaign ==
Romuald Wadagni laid out a platform of tackling poverty and shoring up national security on 23 March. In his speech, Wadagni pledged to create more municipal police forces and work with neighbouring countries to address security challenges surrounding the jihadist insurgency in the country's north. On the same day, The Democrats, now under the leadership of Noureini Atchade, refused to endorse any candidate in the election. In a published interview on 24 March, Wadagni stated that he intended to build upon Patrice Talon's modernisation and development drive, while also making sure that the same development also benefitted every Beninese citizen fairly. The campaign period later officially opened on the dawn of 27 March, running until midnight on 10 April. During Wadagni's campaign, he later proposed creating new development hubs across the country and expanding access to health care. FCBE candidate Paul Hounkpé also spoke to his supporters on 27 March, stating that the election was not over and that the race was not a friendly one either.

The final days of campaigning saw Wadagni rallying thousands of supporters in Cotonou, pledging that he will make microcredit easier to access and involve traders in modern markets. Hounkpé visited Dantokpa Market, also in Cotonou, to meet with the women before traveling to Abomey-Calavi and Porto-Novo to wrap his campaign. Hounkpé vowed to reduce the price of basic products and to secure the release of opponents imprisoned under Talon's administration.

=== Conduct ===
Nana Akufo-Addo, the former president of Ghana, headed the ECOWAS mission to oversee Benin's presidential election. Africanews described the process, stating, "Observers of the election [were] charged with monitoring the technical running of the polls, the neutrality of state institutions, and the election's overall environment to ensure it meets international standards". On 31 March, CENA declared that a total of 7,897,287 people were eligible to vote across 17,462 polling stations in the presidential election, including 62,679 diaspora voters in 112 polling stations in diplomatic and consular representations abroad.

== Results ==
Provisional results released by CENA on the night of 13 April 2026 revealed that the duo formed by Romuald Wadagni and Mariam Chabi Talata received 94.05% of the vote, while the FCBE duo formed by Paul Hounkpè and Judicael Hounwanou followed second with 5.95% of the vote. The provisional turnout of the election was 58.75%. The Constitutional Court of Benin announced further results on 16 April, revealing that Wadagni won 94.27% of the vote, while Hounkpè garnered only 5.73% of the vote. The latter reported turnout was 63.57%.

Candidate	Running mate	Party	Votes	%
Romuald Wadagni	Mariam Chabi Talata	Independent	4,575,449	94.27
Paul Hounkpè	Judicael Hounwanou	Cowry Forces for an Emerging Benin	278,297	5.73
Total			4,853,746	100.00
Valid votes			4,853,746	96.68
Invalid/blank votes			166,655	3.32
Total votes			5,020,401	100.00
Registered voters/turnout			7,897,287	63.57
Source: Constitutional Court

== Reactions and aftermath ==
FCBE candidate Paul Hounkpè congratulated Romuald Wadagni the day after the election on 13 April 2026 and conceded before CENA released their provisional results. Progressive Union Renewal and Republican Bloc jointly issued a statement welcoming the smooth conduct of the election, calling for responsibility while waiting for the official proclamation of results. The electoral mission of ECOWAS that was deployed in Benin welcomed a climate of peace and a good organisation of the election. Opposition candidate Kémi Séba was later arrested on 13 April along with his son and a broker in Pretoria, South Africa at the request of the Beninese government. The broker was alleged to have paid to help Séba travel across the South Africa–Zimbabwe border, with a further intention to help Séba travel to Europe. Séba and his son remained in police custody while extradition processes to Benin began.
