= 2025 Beninese coup attempt =

- Rogue soldiers announce on national television that they have overthrown the government.
Date	7 December 2025
Location	SRTB, Presidential Palace, and Camp Togbin, Cotonou, Benin 6.35°N 2.40°E
Status	Coup failure: Attacks on the Presidential Palace repulsed; ECOWAS stability forces deployment; Ongoing search for coup plotters; Pascal Tigri fled to Togo

Belligerents
Military Committee for Refoundation	Benin; Nigeria; France (Note: France provided logistical and intelligence support to Benin and Nigeria during the coup attempt.); ECOWAS (Note: ECOWAS Standby Force deployed after the coup failed.); Nigeria; Sierra Leone; Ivory Coast; Ghana

Commanders and leaders
Pascal Tigri; Ousmane Samary; Sambieni Castro	(Benin) Patrice Talon; Dieudonné Djimon Tévoédjrè (Nigeria) Bola Tinubu

Units involved
Benin Armed Forces (factions)	Benin Armed Forces: Benin Army; Nigerian Armed Forces; Nigerian Army; Nigerian Air Force; ECOWAS Standby Force; (France) Special Operations Command

Casualties and losses
Several killed, 13 arrested	1 killed, 1 injured 2 abducted, later released
- 3 civilians abducted, 2 survived, 1 killed

On 7 December 2025, several soldiers of the Benin Armed Forces (FAB) led by Lieutenant Colonel Pascal Tigri announced on national television the overthrow of Patrice Talon, the president of Benin, following an attack on Talon's residence in Cotonou and the residences of other top-ranking military officials. Talon's government requested military assistance from Nigeria, and hours later, Beninese interior minister Alassane Seidou said that the coup attempt had been thwarted. The ECOWAS Standby Force was then deployed to maintain security. Several people on both sides, including one civilian, were killed during the attempt.

== Background ==
Benin has been regarded as "one of Africa's more stable democracies". Although Benin faced instability during the first few years after its 1960 independence from France, no coup has taken place there since its 1991 multiparty election. The governments of Benin's northern neighbors Niger and Burkina Faso were overthrown in 2023 and in 2022, respectively; other countries in the region affected by coups include Mali and Guinea in 2021, and Guinea-Bissau's government was overthrown just the month before.

At the time of the attempted coup, President Patrice Talon, in office since 2016, was due to leave office following elections scheduled in April 2026. In January 2025, two of Talon's associates were sentenced to 20 years in prison for allegedly plotting a coup against him in 2024. In November 2025, a constitutional amendment was approved by Benin's National Assembly, extending presidential and legislative terms from five to seven years and creating a Senate, expected to have between 25 and 30 members including Benin's former heads of state and other members appointed by the president. This upper house would have the power to request a second reading of the laws approved by the National Assembly, with some exceptions. This reforms were still pending approval by the Constitutional Court of Benin.

The coup was planned and executed by mutineers stationed at Camp Togbin in Fidjrossè. The assault teams that attacked the residences of high-ranking officials and the Presidential Palace organized their weapons from this camp. Pascal Tigri, who led the coup, was the former commander of the 3rd Combined Arms Battalion of the National Guard, and had recently been promoted to command the Special Forces group of the National Guard. Tigri and his men fought in the jihadist insurgency in Northern Benin.

== Coup attempt ==
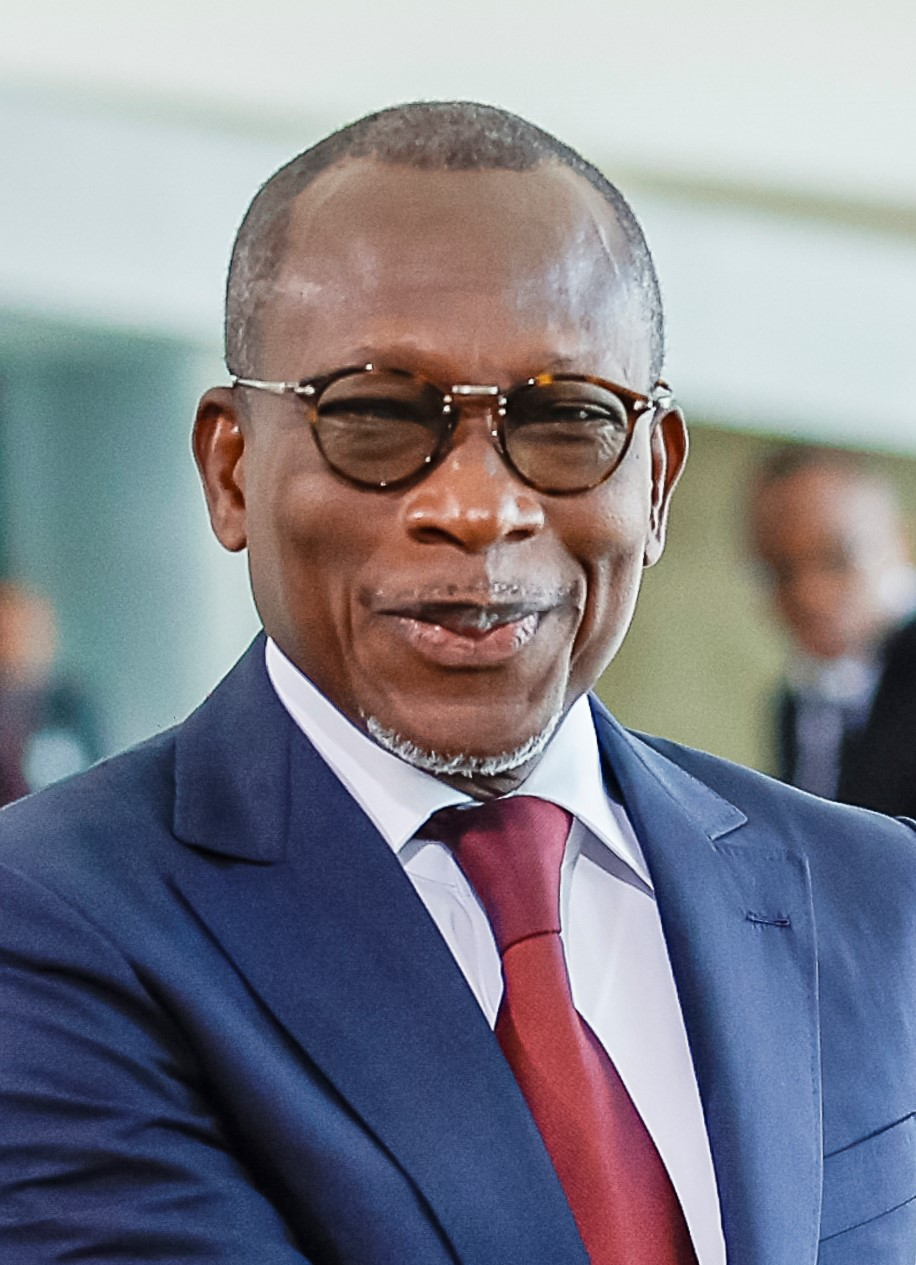
President Patrice Talon was the primary target of the coup attempt.

At around 02:10 WAT, a group of rebellious soldiers from the National Guard dispatched from Camp Togbin arrived at the home of Director of the Military Cabinet Bertin Bada in Abomey-Calavi, intending to kidnap him. While Lt. General Bada managed to flee, his wife Berthe was mortally wounded and abducted; Bada's daughter and grandson were also kidnapped.

The home of the Army Chief of Staff Abou Issa was assaulted next. Maj. General Issa resisted the initial group of soldiers from the National Guard's quick reaction force who were sent to abduct him. After the initial attack against Issa failed, the soldiers left behind a car that contained Lt. General Bada's wife, daughter and grandson. Ambulances took Bada's family members to a hospital, where Bada's wife was pronounced dead. Beninese security officials requested support from soldiers at Camp Togbin. National Guard commander Faizou Gomina was dispatched to Camp Togbin, where he unknowingly asked the head of the rebelling quick reaction force soldiers to rescue Issa. After that, Colonel Gomina met with Lt. Colonel Pascal Tigri, the commander of Benin's special forces and the leader of the coup attempt, then was assaulted and held hostage by the mutineers. The mutinous quick reaction force soldiers returned to Issa's house, where they posed as rescuers before they knocked out Issa and abducted him. Issa was taken to Gomina's location, then they were transported to Tchaourou, where they were released after the failure of the coup.

At either 05:00 or 07:15, the rebelling National Guard soldiers attacked the Presidential Palace in Cotonou. A battle broke out between the mutineers and more than 100 members of the Republican Guard, with President Patrice Talon, his wife, and high-ranking members of the Republican Guard, including the commander Dieudonné Djimon Tévoédjrè, watching over the fighting. Colonel Tévoédjrè deployed the pro-government troops around the Presidential Palace and told the soldiers to hold their fire until the plotters of the coup attempt turned their vehicles toward the palace. The clash in front of the Presidential Palace lasted for about 30 to 45 minutes and resulted in the loyalist troops successfully defending the palace. One pro-government soldier was killed, and one was injured during the battle.

The rebelling soldiers retreated through alleyways to the national broadcaster SRTB, where they held workers hostage. The French Embassy in Cotonou said that gunfire was heard at Camp Guezo, just north of SRTB and the Presidential Palace.

At SRTB, a group of eight rebelling soldiers, led by Lt. Colonel Tigri, declared that Talon had been "removed from office as president of the republic". They also announced the suspension of the constitution and state institutions, and identified themselves as the Military Committee for Refoundation (French: Comité Militaire pour la Refondation, CMR).

The soldiers cited multiple reasons for staging the coup, such as Talon's management of the country, favoritism in the military, the neglect of soldiers killed on duty and their relatives, the deteriorating security situation in northern Benin, cuts to healthcare, increased taxes, and restrictions on political activity. After the announcement, the signal to SRTB was shut off but was restored later in the day.

Videos of military vehicles speeding down Boulevard de la Marina, where the Presidential Palace and the National Assembly are located, circulated around social media. Helicopters were reportedly flying over Cotonou. According to Tévoédjrè, pro-government soldiers launched a counteroffensive on the TV station as the message was being broadcast. One rebel vehicle was destroyed in the battle for the TV station. Soldiers at Camp Togbin then rebelled against the government, with the Beninese government requesting support from France and ECOWAS to quell the coup.

The CMR later announced that all borders were closed and that all political parties were suspended. Meanwhile, soldiers loyal to Talon claimed that he was safe, but his whereabouts were unknown, and that the "regular army" was "regaining control". A presidential adviser later told the BBC that Talon was at the French embassy. Beninʼs foreign minister, Shegun Adjadi Bakari, told Reuters that "there is a coup attempt but the situation is under control", and that "a large part of the army the national guard are still loyal to the president and are controlling the situation." Gunfire was reported throughout Cotonou, especially near the port and the official presidential residence, and helicopters were observed over the area. Mutineers unsuccessfully attacked Cotonou's airport. Soldiers also blocked access to the presidential residence, state television offices, the five-star Sofitel Cotonou hotel, and districts housing international institutions.

Romuald Wadagni, the Beninese Minister of Finance, stated that the situation was "under control", "The mutineers are holed up" and "We are clearing them out, but it's not over yet. We are safe." Wilfried Houngbedji, the spokesperson for the Beninese government, stated that "Everything is fine." The U.S. Embassy in Cotonou urged U.S. citizens in Benin to avoid Cotonou and areas near the presidential compound. The rebel troops were still in control of the state television at 09:00 WAT (UTC+01:00).

== Counter activities ==
External videos
- "#Benin Failed Coup: Message from the Government" (in French), from Bénin TV via YouTube

Following two requests for assistance by the Beninese government, the Nigerian Air Force was deployed to Cotonou to dislodge the putschists, where precision airstrikes upon Camp Togbin were reported. At the headquarters of the quick reaction force, Nigerian Super Toucans strafed the base, then the Super Toucans and a drone launched rocket attacks a few hours later. Several putschists were killed. Nigeria also expelled the coup plotters from the state television headquarters and immobilized several armored vehicles. Nigerian ground forces entered Benin shortly after. This marked Nigeria's first foreign military intervention since the 2017 Gambian constitutional crisis. The French government also said that it had provided surveillance, observation and logistical assistance to the FAB to help thwart the coup, with president Emmanuel Macron leading a "coordination effort" and being in contact with President Talon and ECOWAS representatives. The head of the Republican Guard, Dieudonné Djimon Tévoédjrè, said French special forces were sent from Abidjan to conduct mopping up operations. Benin's interior minister, Alassane Seidou stated that the FAB thwarted the attempted coup at 11:09. The government credited loyalist troops for suppressing the coup.

At least 14 people were arrested, including 12 active-duty soldiers and another who was dismissed. Twelve suspects are believed to have participated in the attack on state television. Tigri and several of his men remained fugitives by the night of 9 December. Beninese authorities later said that Tigri and several colleagues were in hiding in Lomé in neighboring Togo. Tigri later fled further into Ouagadougou, Burkina Faso and then into Niamey, Niger.

At 19:37, ECOWAS released a statement announcing the deployment of Nigerian, Sierra Leonean, Ivorian, and Ghanaian soldiers to aid the Beninese government in repelling the putschists. Ivorian soldiers arrived in Cotonou on that night. Later that evening, President Talon appeared on television and reiterated the failure of the coup, while promising to punish "this treachery". Weapons were also discovered stashed in the Togbin, Fidjrosse, and Akogbato neighborhoods. Following the attack, roads to and from the Presidential Palace were closed, with police officers in front diverting traffic from the scene. Traffic elsewhere in Cotonou was normal.

=== Arrests ===
The Beninese government made several arrests and issued several arrest warrants for people they deemed supportive of or involved in the coup attempt. At least 30 suspects appeared at the Special Criminal Court (CRIET) on 15 December in connection with the coup attempt. On 12 December, Talon's political opponent and head of the Restaurer l'Espoir (Restore Hope) party Candide Azanai was arrested. On 14 December, Chabi Yayi, the son of former president Thomas Boni Yayi, was arrested at his house for reasons alleged to be related to the coup attempt. Arrest warrants were also issued for Kémi Séba and Sabi Korogone, who supported the coup. By March 2026, about 100 alleged participants were in jail and awaiting a trial.

In March 2026, the Republican Guard issued a reward of more than €30,000 for information leading to the arrest of the coup plotters.

== Reactions ==
The coup attempt was condemned by ECOWAS, the African Union, and United Nations Secretary-General António Guterres. Neighboring Nigeria called the coup a "direct assault on democracy," and praised Beninese security forces for "defending the constitutional order and guaranteeing the safety of the president". On 9 December, the Senate of Nigeria formally approved a request by President Bola Tinubu to deploy soldiers in Benin at the request of the latter's government. France also condemned the coup and offered its full political support to ECOWAS.

=== Domestic ===
Kémi Séba, a candidate in the 2026 Beninese presidential election and pro-AES and pro-Russian blogger, expressed his support for the coup while it was ongoing. Other pro-AES social media accounts posted claims heralding the coup's success as soon as news broke.

Les Democrates, the primary opposition party in Benin and party of former president Thomas Boni Yayi, condemned the coup and released a statement supporting the Beninese government. Boni Yayi himself released a statement in support of the government on 7 December, expressing solidarity with Talon. The Islamic Union of Benin released a similar statement. The Cowry Forces for an Emerging Benin (FCBE) political party also condemned the coup attempt and released a statement in support of the government. Former president Nicéphore Soglo also released a statement supporting the government.

Rallies in favor of Talon's government were organized in Banikoara on 9 December.
