= Bénin TV Junior =

- Country: Benin
- Broadcast area: National
- Headquarters: Cotonou

Programming
- Language: French

Ownership
- Owner: Société de radio et de télévision du Bénin
- Sister channels: Bénin TV

History
- Launched: 2013; 13 years ago
- Former names: Ado TV (2013–2025)

Links
- Website: https://srtb.bj

Bénin TV Junior (BTV Junior), formerly Ado TV, is a Beninese children's channel owned by Société de radio et de télévision du Bénin (SRTB).

== History ==
=== Ado TV ===
Ado TV was created as a result of the approval by the Beninese authorities of the creation of new radio and television stations on 31 January 2023. As of 2019, Ado TV was part of the public media sector, but was not a part of ORTB. The Ministry of Sports announced that it would reformat Ado TV as a sports channel in 2023, as one of its three priorities.

=== Bénin TV Junior ===
In November 2023, in the context of the restructuring of ORTB into the current SRTB, it was announced in that Ado TV and Ado FM were set to be part of the new media corporation. The TV channel was set to be repositioned as a children's channel. The relaunch would help the channel find an audience, which Ado TV lacked. The new identity and format of the channel launched on 6 April 2025.
