= Bénin TV =

Television channel

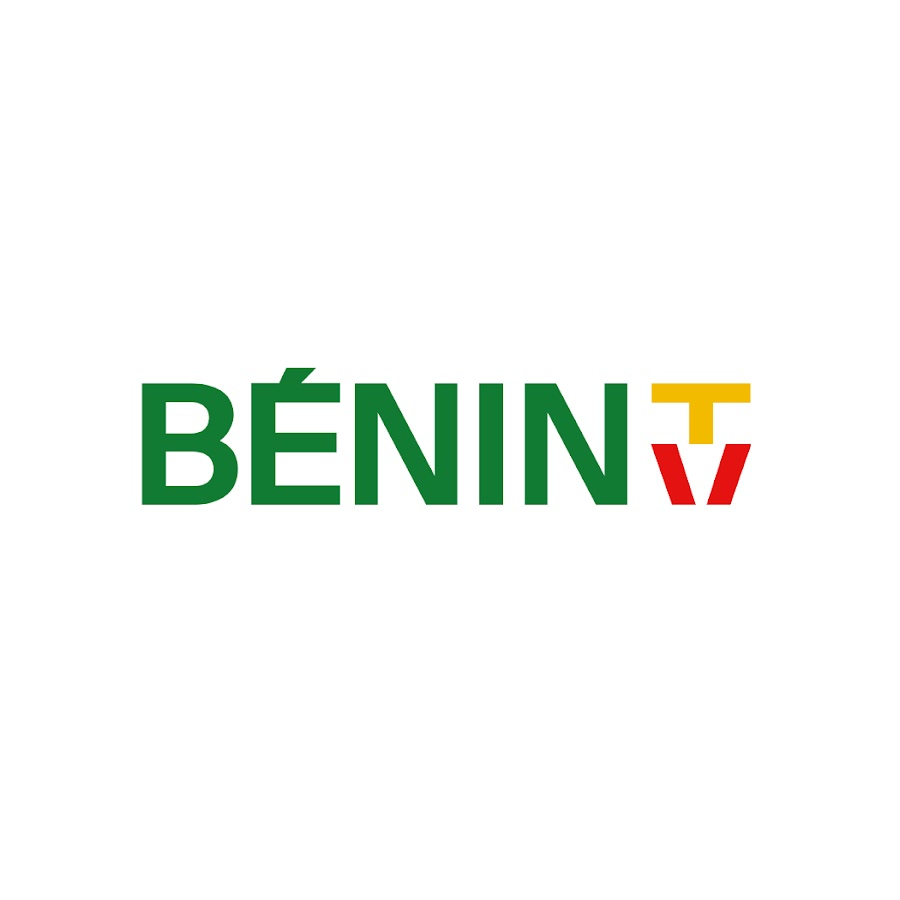
- Country: Benin
- Broadcast area: National
- Headquarters: Cotonou

Programming
- Language: French

Ownership
- Owner: Société de radio et de télévision du Bénin
- Sister channels: Bénin TV Junior

History
- Launched: 31 December 1978 (47 years ago)
- Former names: ORTB Télévision Nationale (1978–2025)

Links
- Website: https://srtb.bj

Bénin TV (BTV) is the main channel of SRTB, Benin's state broadcaster. Prior to 2025, it was named as ORTB Télévision Nationale. The channel broadcasts in French.

== History ==
=== Development ===
The idea of a national television network first emerged in 1964, when the government signed an agreement with ORTF to provide technical training in Paris. In 1969, thanks to funding from the national lottery and French co-operation, a plan to set up an experimental service, known as mini-télévision, was made at the offices of the Office de Postes et Téléphones de Cotonou. With the change of regime (President Émile Derlin Zinsou was deposed on 10 December 1969), the plan was halted.

Wishing to put Dahomey, which had returned to relative political stability, at the same technical level as its West African neighbors, President Pompidou's France relaunched the process via French cooperation and delivered to Cotonou the television production and broadcasting infrastructures in the course of the year 1972. The Dahomean government then created the Dahomey Radio and Television Office (ORTD) by law 72-43 of October 20, 1972, of which the structure and operation are modeled on the ORTF.

The coup d'état of 26 October 1972, which brought Commander Mathieu Kérékou to power and through which Dahomey became the People's Republic of Benin, froze the launch of television, which the commander considered as a tool intended for privileged people, not compatible with its democratic and popular policy which aims to guarantee the people equal access to the media. The construction of the television transmitter was put on hold and order 75-43 of the Kérékou military council transformed the ORTD into the Benin Radio and Television Office (ORTB) whose main mission is to develop coverage of the territory by national radio.

=== Early years ===
On 31 December 1978, after 14 years of planning, ORTB finally started television broadcasts. At 6:45pm that evening, Marie Thérèse Gonçalves appeared, the first face seen on national television. The first news bulletin was read by Marie Constance Egbo Glèle and Noël Aubert Sohouénou at 8pm.

Color broadcasting began as a test in 1982 and transitioned to full color broadcasting in 1984. By the late 1980s, ORTB had two television transmitters, in Cotonou on channel 4 and Parakou on channel 6, both with an ERP of 10kW.

In 1997, ORTB lost its television monopoly due to the passing of Law nº 97-010 enabling the introduction of private radio and television stations; the first private television station in Benin, Chaîne 2, opened in December 1997.

=== Bénin TV ===
On 6 April 2025, in line with the renaming of the corporation from ORTB to SRTB, the channel was renamed Bénin TV, introducing a new look and a new schedule.

In the early hours of 7 December 2025, elements of the Benin Armed Forces reportedly seized the national broadcaster, delivering a speech on the channel about the removal of the president. The attempt at launching a coup d'état was foiled by the late morning.
