= Kémi Séba =

French-born Beninese political activist (born 1981)

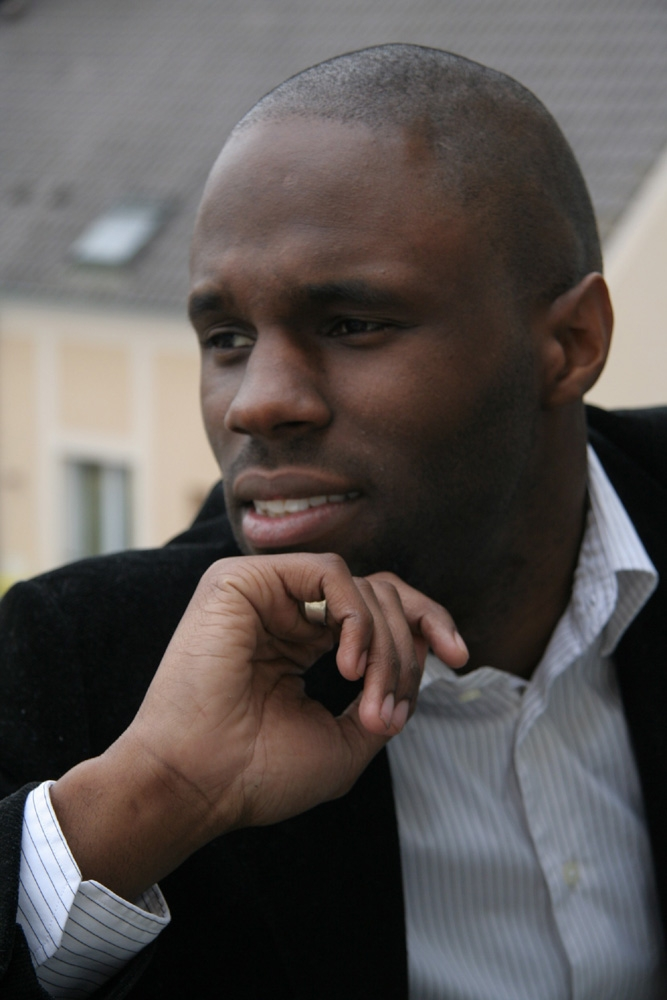
- Séba in 2007
- Born: Stellio Gilles Robert Capo Chichi; December 9, 1981 (age 44); Strasbourg, Bas-Rhin, France
- Citizenship: Beninese; French (until 8 July 2024)
- Political party: Parti kémite (2002); Tribu Ka (2004 - 2006); Mouvement des damnés de l'impérialisme (2008 - 2010); NBBP (2010 - 2011)

Kémi Séba (French-language version of Egyptian for "black star"), born Stellio Gilles Robert Capo Chichi (9 December 1981), is a French-born Beninese politician, pan-Africanist leader, activist, writer and journalist, known for his opposition to Françafrique and imperialism in the 21st century. Since August 2024 he serves as advisor to Abdourahamane Tiani, the leader of the incumbent military junta in Niger.

Séba initially gained prominence as the leader of the black power, Afrocentric, Black nationalist, and antisemitic group Ka tribe, which was dissolved by the French government in 2006. He was then arrested and sentenced several times on related charges and continued antisemitic comments, being released from prison in 2008. After this, he converted to Islam and took on leadership positions in the anti-Zionist MDI and the US-based New Black Panther Party.

In 2011, Séba moved to Senegal. From 2013 onwards, he became a geopolitical analyst on several West African televisions, and also a speaker on Pan-Africanism in African universities. In 2015, he founded the NGO Urgences Panafricanistes and became a prominent figure in the opposition to the economic influence of France in African countries, seen as a neocolonial phenomenon. He initiated the demonstrations against the CFA franc which took place in January 2017 in several French-speaking African countries. Although he is considered highly controversial in the Western hemisphere, he is a popular figure in Francophone Africa.

In December 2025, he supported an attempted coup d'état aimed at overthrowing Beninese President Patrice Talon. The attempt failed, and the Beninese authorities issued an international arrest warrant for him. He fled to South Africa, where he was later arrested and imprisoned in April 2026 while attempting to flee to Zimbabwe. The Beninese authorities are seeking his extradition to Benin so that he can be tried there.

== Early and personal life ==
Capo Chichi was born in Strasbourg to immigrant parents from Benin. (Note: Another source says that Capo Chichi's parents were from the Ivory Coast and Haiti. Reiss, "Laugh Riots", The New Yorker, 2007 (see below.)) He joined the US-based Nation of Islam (NOI) as an eighteen-year-old, and later formulated his own ideology while visiting Egypt in his twenties. As a result of this process, he took the nom de guerre Kémi Séba and became the spokesperson of the Parti Kémite (Kemite Party), which was founded in 2002 and inspired by Khalid Abdul Muhammad.

== Educational ==
Séba is known for having an atypical educational background. In high school, Séba was a student in the science section before starting to skip classes to hang around the streets of the suburbs of Paris, in the Afro-ghettos, to the great displeasure of his parents. He resumed evening classes at the Faculty of Law of the university of Paris X Nanterre from 2000 to 2002, obtaining his diploma in capacity in law with honors. He was top of his class, being 1st out of 200 students in the first year. He then left the university to devote himself strictly to his ideological training through political activism. It was not until 2011 that he resumed university studies, this time in political philosophy and research methodology, followed by accelerated training in philosophy under the direction of the renowned Gabonese philosopher, Grégoire Biyogo, at the ICAD (Cheik Anta Diop Institute) of Libreville. At the end of this process, concluded once again with distinction, Séba was made researcher in philosophy within the same institute. In April 2025, Séba was awarded an honorary doctorate in political science by the Congolese University Bel Campus, for his ideological impact on Pan-Africanism in the 21st century, in Africa and the Caribbean.

== Tribu KA ==
In December 2004, Capo Chichi founded the Parisian political group Tribu Ka, which promotes black identity and has been accused of racism against Jews. The group said it followed the ideology of the American NOI leader, Louis Farrakhan. They have also been described as proponents of a mix of antisemitic Kemetism and Guénonian Islam. The group's name is an abbreviation for "The Atenian Tribe of Kemet".

In a May 2006 demonstration, twenty or more Tribu Ka members marched along the Rue des Rosiers (in the Marais, a Jewish neighborhood) shouting antisemitic slogans and threatening pedestrians. Interior Minister Nicolas Sarkozy sent a letter to Justice Minister Pascal Clément saying Tribu Ka could be indicted for racist incitement. SOS Racisme and the Union des étudiants juifs de France also called for Tribu Ka to be banned. Clément opened an investigation. The Ministry of Interior dissolved Tribu Ka on 26 July 2006, but it reformed in Sarcelles under the name Génération Kémi Séba. During the trial of Youssouf Fofana, the leader of the ethnic gang Les Barbares that murdered Ilan Halimi, Capo Chichi had sent an intimidating e-mail message to various Jewish associations.

== Imprisonment ==
Séba was arrested in September 2006 for making allegedly antisemitic posts on his website, and again in February 2007 after he called a public official "Zionist scum". After the initial court hearing in 2006, supporters chanted, "The judge is a Zionist, the client is a Zionist, the decision will be Zionist." In February 2007, a French court near Paris sentenced Capo Chichi, the self-described "militant defender of the dignity of Black people", to five months imprisonment for criminal contempt of the law. In April 2008, a Parisian court verdict determined Génération Kémi Séba was the reconstitution of the dissolved group Tribu Ka, and sentenced Capo Chichi to a one-year prison sentence with suspension. In June 2009, Brice Hortefeux, Minister of the Interior, ordered the dissolution of the group Jeunesse Kémi Séba, founded to replace Génération Kémi Séba.

== MDI ==
After his release from prison in July 2008, Capo Chichi announced that he had converted to Islam. In March 2008, he became the secretary general of Mouvement des damnés de l'impérialisme (MDI, "Movement of Those Damned By Imperialism"). MDI retains close ties with the Shia paramilitary Lebanese-based group Hezbollah in their anti-Zionist campaigns. In June 2009, MDI announced that Holocaust denier Serge Thion had joined the movement. Inside the MDI blogger Boris Le Lay was "in charge of external relations for the Europe zone".

== New Black Panther Party ==
In April 2010, Malik Zulu Shabazz, leader of the US-based New Black Panther Party (NBPP), appointed Capo Chichi the party's representative in France and gave him the nom de guerre Kemiour Aarim Shabazz. In July 2010, Capo Chichi left his position as the president of MDI but continued as the head of the francophone branch of NBPP.

== Activity in Africa ==
In 2011, he left the NBPP and moved to Senegal, where he continued his political activism and became a lecturer in African universities and, from 2013, a political columnist in various African television channels. This earned him a certain popularity among the French-speaking African youth, who considered him as a defender of African sovereignty. Originally close to the Nation of Islam, he eventually joined Voodoo in 2014, which he links to the work of the metaphysician René Guénon about the perennialism as he explains in his latest book Free Africa or death. He was the initiator of the demonstrations against the CFA franc who took in several French-speaking African countries. In January 2018, he was elected as 2017 African Personality of the Year by Africanews, for his fight against French neocolonialism and the CFA Franc in Africa.

In December 2019, while accusing France of being partly responsible for terrorism in the Sahel, Kémi Séba placed himself at the disposal of the regional armies, to fight against the jihadists. He therefore proposed to the presidents of the G5 Sahel the creation of a group of "Pan-African civilian volunteers". On 23 February 2020, Séba returned to Senegal to attend the appeal for his trial for having burned a CFA franc note. He was arrested at Blaise-Diagne airport, detained for 30 hours and then deported to Belgium. The holding of the trial was then postponed. In October 2020, Séba went to Côte d'Ivoire to request a postponement of the 2020 presidential election, following a third term of Alassane Ouattara. In October 2021, three years after being turned away at Conakry airport, Séba was allowed to enter Guinean territory from where he met Mamady Doumbouya.

In February 2024, the French authorities initiated a procedure for loss of French nationality against Séba, who also holds Beninese nationality. French authorities accused Séba of spreading anti-French sentiment across West Africa. On 9 July 2024, By virtue of a decree published in the Official French Journal, Séba was stripped of his French nationality. Seba had earlier published a video online in which he burned a document that he claimed was his French passport. In August 2024, he announced via X that he had been granted a diplomatic passport by Nigerien authorities. He posted a picture of the purported diplomatic passport bio data page. His claims were confirmed by the French secret service during his last arrest in Paris in October 2024. Since August 2024 he serves as advisor to Abdourahamane Tiani, the leader of the incumbent military junta in Niger.

In January 2025, Séba announced that he would run for President of Benin in the 2026 Beninese presidential election after denouncing the incumbent president Patrice Talon. On 15 April 2025, Séba was awarded the rank of Doctor Honoris Causa in political science by Bel Campus University in the Democratic Republic of Congo (Kinshasa). On 31 March 2025, Séba was arrested as he was preparing to hold a press conference. On 3 May 2025, he hosted a conference dedicated to denouncing the CFA franc and challenging the agreements inherited from colonization in Central Africa. In June 2025, Séba is organizing a tour in Gabon against the CFA Franc, and cooperation agreements in Africa and France. In December 2025, an international arrest warrant was issued for Séba by the Benin government after his support for a failed coup against President Talon. In April 2026, Séba was arrested along with his son in Pretoria, South Africa at the request of Beninese government. Previously, Séba was intended to illegally cross the South Africa-Zimbabwe border via broker who was also arrested with him with an intention to flee to Europe. He was expected to be extradited to Benin soon.

== Geopolitical connections ==
In March 2015, Kémi Séba was received by Mahmoud Ahmadinejad to talk about the need to collaborate between countries of the Third World confronted with Western imperialism. In December 2017, he was invited to Moscow by the Russian nationalist intellectual Aleksandr Dugin to talk about the need to create a geopolitical alliance between the Pan-Africanist and Eurasian movements to join forces against hegemony of the West, and consolidate the political project of a multipolar world.

In March 2022, Séba was invited by the Executive Secretary of the Russia-Africa Forum: What's Next? On MGIMO base Igor Tkachenko gave a lecture on the future of Africa in the world economic system, supporting the position of President Vladimir Putin on the Russian invasion of Ukraine. Also in 2022, he was received by the Chairman of the Transitional Government of Mali. On 24–26 October 2022, he arrived in Moscow again upon the invitation of Igor Tkachenko to participate in the Second Youth Forum "Russia-Africa: what's next?" On the basis of MGIMO of the Ministry of Foreign Affairs of Russia. On the fields of which Séba delivered his sensational "Moscow" speech and was received by representatives of the Russian Foreign Ministry and other authorities. On 12 March 2023, a televised intervention on the French Parliamentarian channel was cancelled due to accusations him being an asset for Russian propaganda. Séba has been financially supported by Russian oligarch and mercenary leader Yevgeny Prigozhin. On 9 July 2024, Séba was stripped of his French nationality. In May 2025, Séba declined all offers of political alliances with lawyer Robert Bourgi.

== Books ==
- Supra-négritude, Fiat-Lux éditions 2013, ISBN 979-1091157018
- Black Nihilism, 2014
- Obscure Époque – fiction géopolitique, 2016
- Philosophie de la panafricanité fondamentale – Édition Fiat Lux, 2023 ISBN 9791091157391
