= ECOWAS Standby Force =

West African security arrangement

- Allegiance: Economic Community of West African States (ECOWAS)
- Branch: Military, Police, Civilian
- Type: Standby arrangement
- Role: Military intervention in times of crisis within the ECOWAS region
- Part of: African Standby Force (ASF)

Found in 1975, the ECOWAS Standby Force (ESF) is a standby arrangement made up of military, police and civilian components in accordance with Chapter VIII of the United Nations Charter which provides for regional peace and security arrangements. A partial legal basis is given by Article 21 of the ECOWAS Protocol Relating to the Mechanism for Conflict Prevention, Management, Resolution, Peacekeeping and Security.

== Background ==
The ESF forms an integral component of the broader African Standby Force (ASF) framework, which consists of five regional units (North, East, West/ECOWAS, Central, and South). The ASF represents a multinational, continental African, and diverse peacekeeping entity, encompassing military, law enforcement, and civilian components, all operating under the guidance of the African Union. The primary mission of the ASF is to be activated during periods of turmoil within the African continent.

== Deployment ==
=== Liberia ===
In Liberia, from 1990 to 1997, ECOWAS actively engaged in diplomatic efforts and peacekeeping operations amid the civil war. ECOWAS justified its involvement by citing adherence to an international normative framework in which sovereignty was considered the fundamental constitutive norm, and non-intervention stood as the primary regulatory norm.

=== Mali ===
In Mali, after a coup in which the military junta announced a four-year delay in the transition to elected civilian rule, ECOWAS implemented economic sanctions against the country. In reaction to this development, ECOWAS activated its standby force, emphasizing its preparedness for potential future actions. These sanctions encompassed the closure of land and air borders with other member countries of ECOWAS.

=== Gambia ===
In Gambia, in January 2017, ECOWAS conducted a military intervention in response to the prolonged refusal of long-time Gambian President Yahya Jammeh to relinquish power following his defeat in the 2016 presidential election to Adama Barrow. This intervention ultimately resolved the constitutional crisis that had unfolded between 2016 and 2017. On January 19, at the behest of Barrow, who had been inaugurated as the new president earlier that day at the Gambian embassy in Dakar, Senegal, ECOWAS forces entered the country. As these troops approached the capital, Banjul, Jammeh chose to step down from his position and departed the country. Following his departure, 4,000 ECOWAS troops remained in The Gambia to maintain order in preparation for Barrow to return and consolidate his presidency.

=== Niger ===
In July 2023 following the coup against Ouhoumoudou Mahamadou's government in Niger, in a second emergency meeting on the situation in Niger in Abuja, ECOWAS on August 10 activated standby force and threatened to intervene militarily to restore constitutional order in Niger.

In August 2023, after a military coup took place in Niger, ECOWAS issued a directive for the mobilization of a "Ready Force" in alignment with its resolution to reinstate democracy and reestablish constitutional governance in the Niger Republic. The heads of state reached a consensus to strongly convey their demands to the military administration that had ousted President Mohamed Bazoum from power in the Niger Republic. If necessary, a potential regional military intervention conducted through the "ECOWAS Ready Force" could serve as a final recourse to resolve the situation.

After ECOWAS issued a threat of military intervention on September 16, 2023, Mali, Niger, and Burkina Faso created a mutual defense pact known as the Alliance of Sahel States.

=== Benin ===
The ECOWAS Standby Force was deployed to Benin on 7 December 2025 following the unsuccessful 2025 Beninese coup attempt.

== Recent developments ==
On 27 June 2024, ECOWAS defence chiefs met in Abuja, Nigeria to discuss a proposed budget of $2.6 billion for the activation of the sub-region’s standby force. The two proposals considered were a 5,000-strong force with a budget of $2.6 billion and a 1,650-strong force with a budget of $481 million. The meeting aimed to decide which option to implement in light of mounting security challenges in the sub-region.

== See also ==
- 2025 Beninese coup attempt
- Alliance of Sahel States
- ECOWAS Monitoring Group
- List of non-UN peacekeeping missions
