= South Africa–Zimbabwe border =

International border

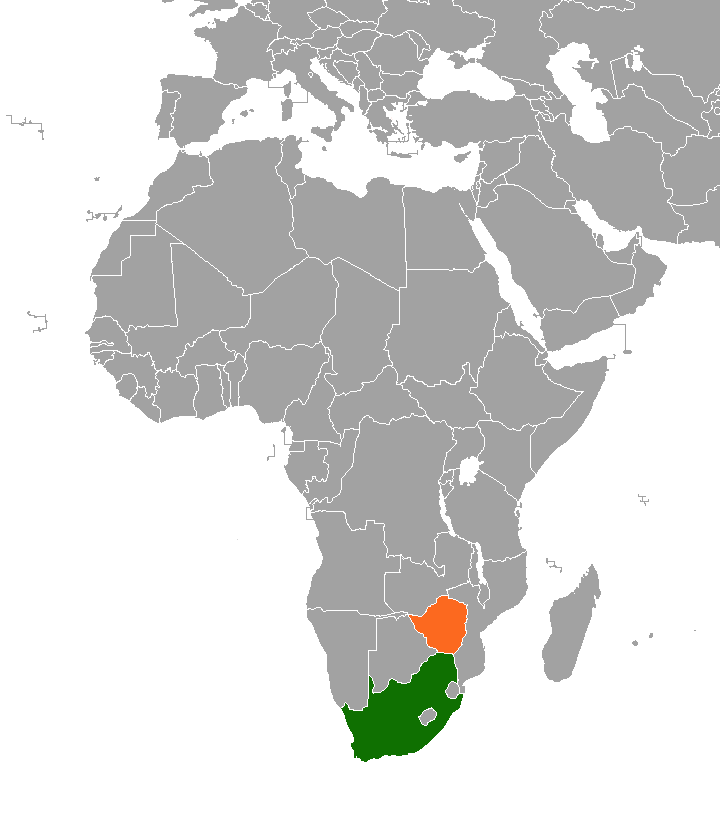
South Africa (green) and Zimbabwe (orange)

The border between South Africa and Zimbabwe is 225 kilometres (140 mi) long, and follows the median line of the Limpopo River.

== Geography ==
The western tripoint with Botswana is located at the confluence of the Shashe River with the Limpopo. The location of the eastern tripoint with Mozambique is not entirely certain; it is situated either at the confluence of the Luvuvhu River with the Limpopo, or at a point nearby in the Limpopo defined by beacons on the Mozambique–Zimbabwe border. The border was established by the Pretoria Convention of 1881 and restated by the London Convention of 1884 which defined the boundaries of the South African Republic (the Transvaal Republic). The South African Republic subsequently became the Transvaal Colony and then part of the Union of South Africa, while north of the Limpopo Matabeleland became part of Southern Rhodesia which became Zimbabwe.

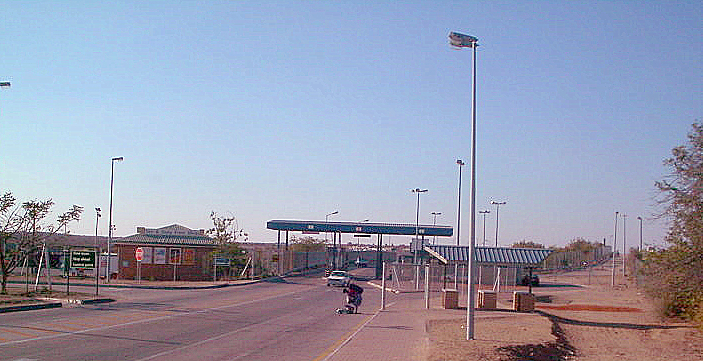
Border post at Beit Bridge

There is a single crossing at Beit Bridge, where the South African N1 highway and the Zimbabwean A6 highway are joined by the Alfred Beit Road Bridge. A separate bridge carries a railway line, which is connected to Pretoria in South Africa and to Rutenga and Bulawayo in Zimbabwe.

== External Resources ==
- South Africa Border Crossing Guide
