= Société de radio et de télévision du Bénin =

TV channel and radio operator in Benin

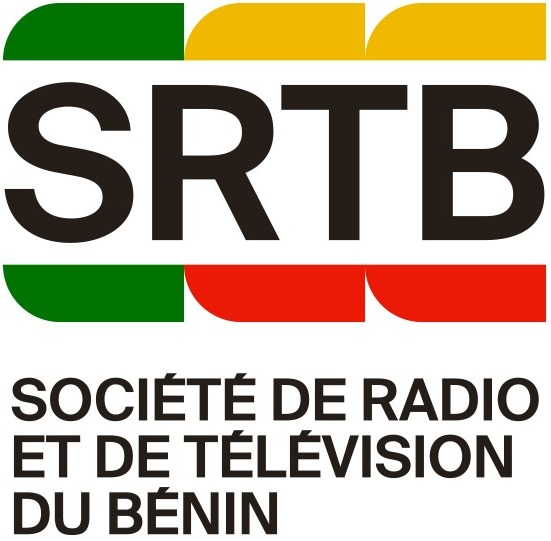
- Logo

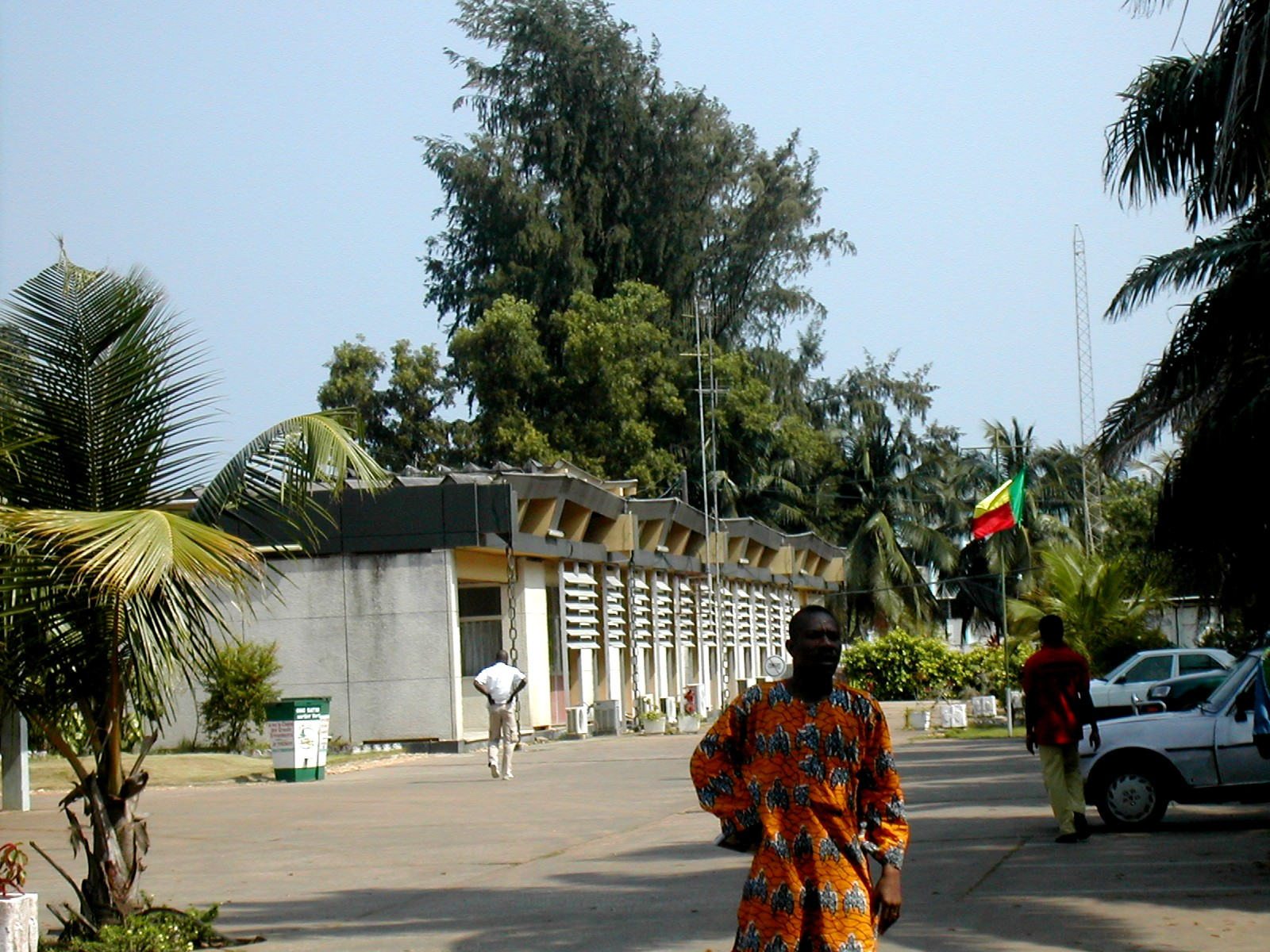
- The headquarters in Cotonou.

History
- Founded: 1972; 54 years ago
- Former names: Radiodiffusion du Dahomey; Office de Radiodiffusion et Télévision du Bénin

Société de Radio et de Télévision du Bénin (SRTB S.A), formerly known as Radiodiffusion du Dahomey and Office de Radiodiffusion et Télévision du Bénin (ORTB) is a mainstream terrestrial television channel and radio operator in Benin. It has its headquarters in Cotonou. It operates three radio stations and two television channels (Bénin TV and Bénin TV Junior).

== History ==
The idea of a national television network first emerged in 1964, when the government signed an agreement with ORTF to provide technical training in Paris. In 1969, thanks to funding from the national lottery and French co-operation, a plan to set up an experimental service, known as "mini-télévision", was made at the offices of the Office de Postes et Téléphones de Cotonou. With the change of regime (President Émile Derlin Zinsou was deposed on 10 December 1969), the plan was halted.

Wishing to put Dahomey, which had returned to relative political stability, at the same technical level as its West African neighbors, President Pompidou's France relaunched the process via French cooperation and delivered to Cotonou the television production and broadcasting infrastructures in the course of the year 1972. The Dahomean government then created the Dahomey Radio and Television Office (ORTD) by law 72-43 of October 20, 1972, of which the structure and operation are modeled on the ORTF.

The coup d'état of October 26, 1972, which brought Commander Mathieu Kérékou to power and through which Dahomey became the People's Republic of Benin, froze the launch of television, which the commander considered as a tool intended for privileged people, not compatible with its democratic and popular policy which aims to guarantee the people equal access to the media. The construction of the television transmitter is put on hold and order 75-43 of the Kérékou military council transforms the ORTD into the Benin Radio and Television Office (ORTB) whose main mission is to develop coverage of the territory by national radio.

By the late 1980s, ORTB had two television transmitters, in Cotonou on channel 4 and Parakou on channel 6, both with an ERP of 10kW.

In 2025, ORTB has been changing its name to Société de radio et de télévision du Bénin (SRTB). Its headquarters were seized on 7 December 2025, as part of an unsuccessful coup attempt by members of the Benin Armed Forces.
