= Presidential Palace, Cotonou =

Palais de la Marina
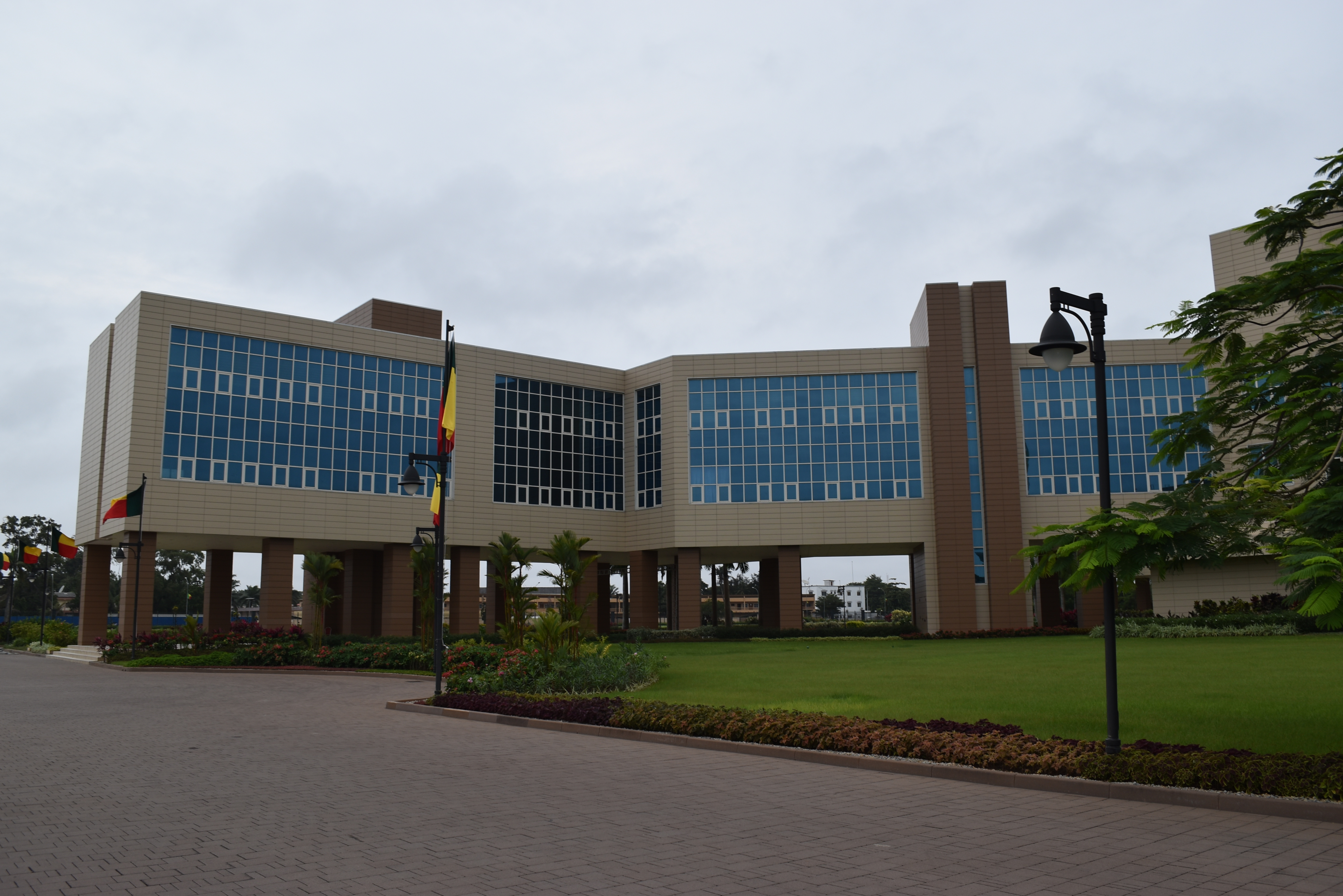
- The Presidential Palace in 2022
- Interactive map of the Palais de la Marina area
- Alternative names: Presidential Palace

General information
- Location: Palais de la Marina, Cotonou, Benin, Cotonou, Benin
- Coordinates: 6.3517°N 2.4090°E

The Palais de la Marina (simply called the Presidential Palace or the Marina Palace) is a government complex in Cotonou, Benin. The palace is relevant in Beninese politics, being used to hold government meetings between the Cabinet of Benin, ambassadors, and the president.

== History ==
=== 2025 coup d'etat attempt ===
On 7 December 2025, several soldiers of the Benin Armed Forces (FAB) led by Lieutenant Colonel Pascal Tigri announced on national television the overthrow of Patrice Talon, the president of Benin, following an attack on the palace and the residences of other top-ranking military officials.

At 05:00, rebelling National Guard soldiers attacked the palace. A battle broke out between the mutineers and members of the Republican Guard, with President Patrice Talon, his wife, and high-ranking members of the Republican Guard including the commander Dieudonné Djimon Tévoédjrè watching over. This clash in front of the palace lasted for about 45 minutes. One pro-government soldier was killed, and one was injured during the battle.

== Exhibitions ==
=== Return of French artifacts ===
On 9 November 2025, President Talon, while visiting Paris, France, was given twenty-six works of art taken from Dahomey when the French ran expeditions in modern-day Benin. The works, which include the doors to the Palace of Abomey, were given back to Benin a ceremony in the palace. All of the items were on display in the palace as part of a public exhibition.

== See also ==
- Benin
- President of Benin
