= Alassane Seidou =

Beninese politician

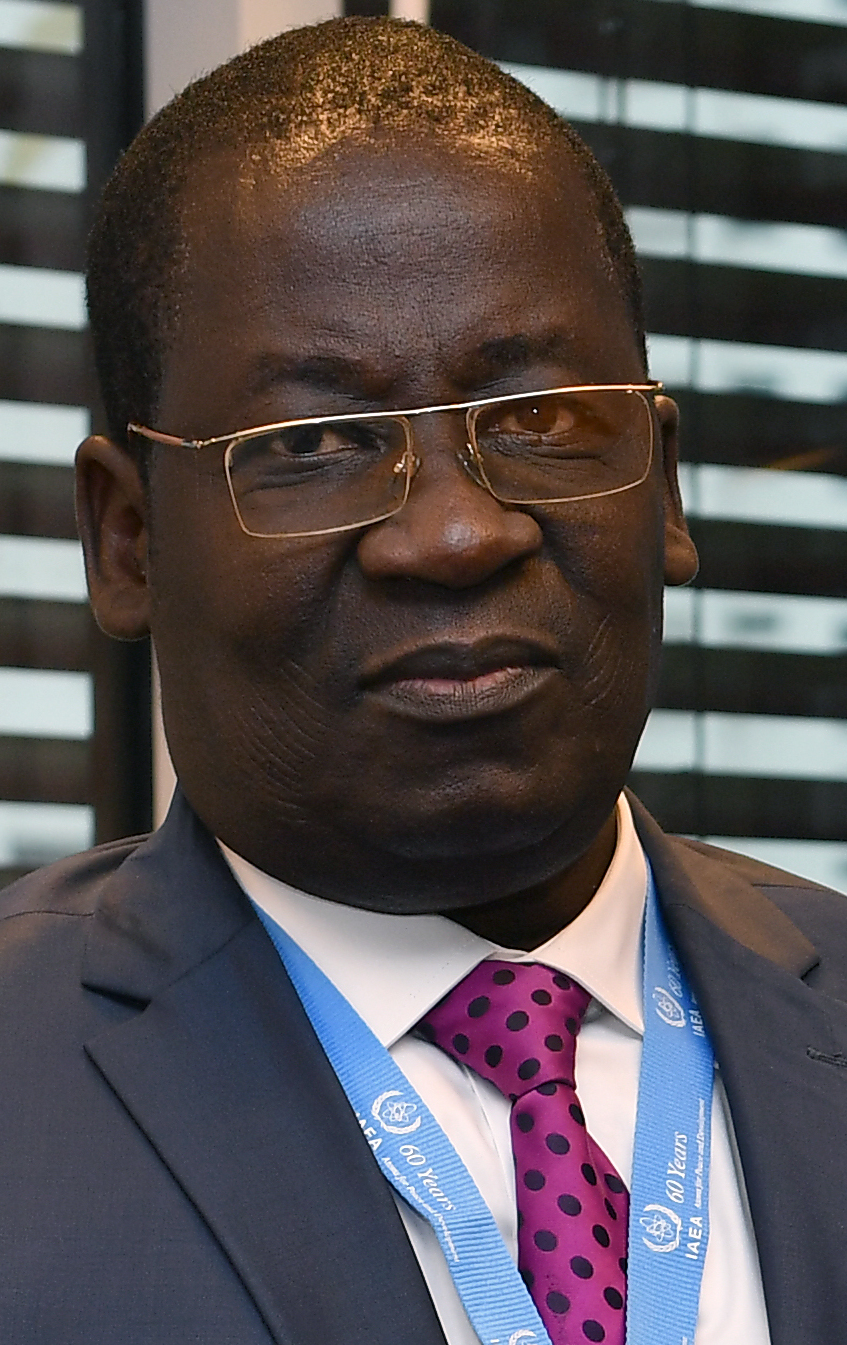

Minister of Interior and Public Security of Benin
- President: Patrice Talon

Minister of Decentralization and Local Governance of Benin
- Incumbent
- Assumed office 25 May 2021
- President: Patrice Talon
- Succeeded by: Raphaël Akotegnon

Personal details
- Born: Benin
- Party: Independent

Alassane Seidou is a Beninese politician and educator. He is the current Minister of Interior and Public Security of Benin, and former Minister of Decentralization and Local Governance, having been appointed to the latter position in early 2021 by the current president of Benin, Patrice Talon. His term began on 25 May 2021.

Awards and achievements
Preceded by	Minister of Decentralization and Local Governance of Benin	Succeeded by
